= Martin (name) =

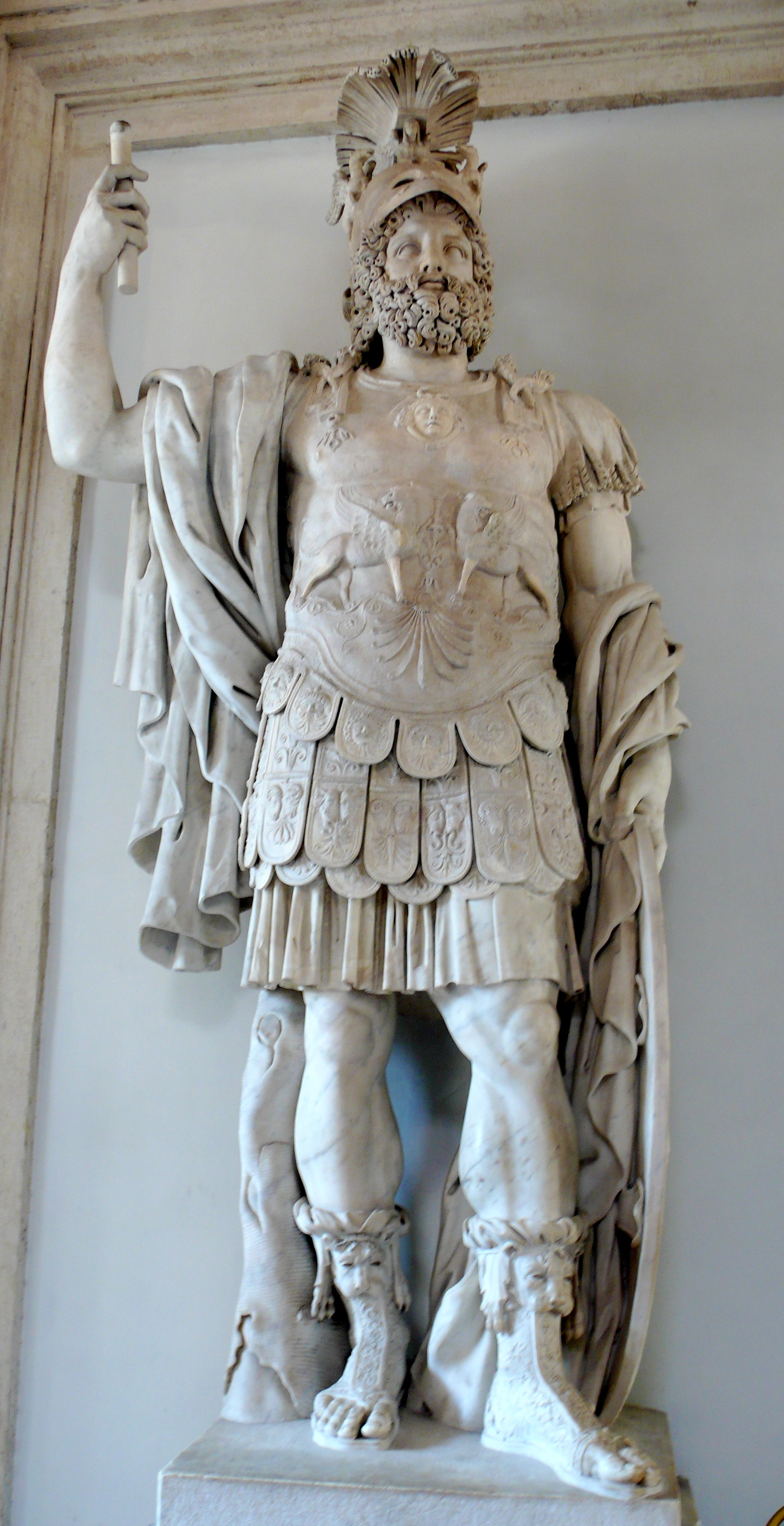
- Statue of Mars, 1st century, found in the Forum of Nerva (Capitoline Museums, Rome)
- Pronunciation: English: /ˈmɑːrtɪn, -tən/ Czech: [ˈmartɪn] Finnish: [ˈmɑrtin] French: [maʁtɛ̃] German: [ˈmaʁtiːn] Norwegian: [ˈmɑ̀ʈːɪn] Serbo-Croatian: [mǎrtin] Spanish: [maɾˈtin] Swedish: [ˈmǎʈːɪn]
- Gender: Male

Origin
- Origin: Latin
- Meaning: Of Mars, warlike, warrior
- Region of origin: Roman Empire

Other names
- Related names: Martyn, Martti, Morten, Marten, Märten, Maarten, Martijn, Martino, Mārtiņš, Mars, Martinus, Martiniano, Ma

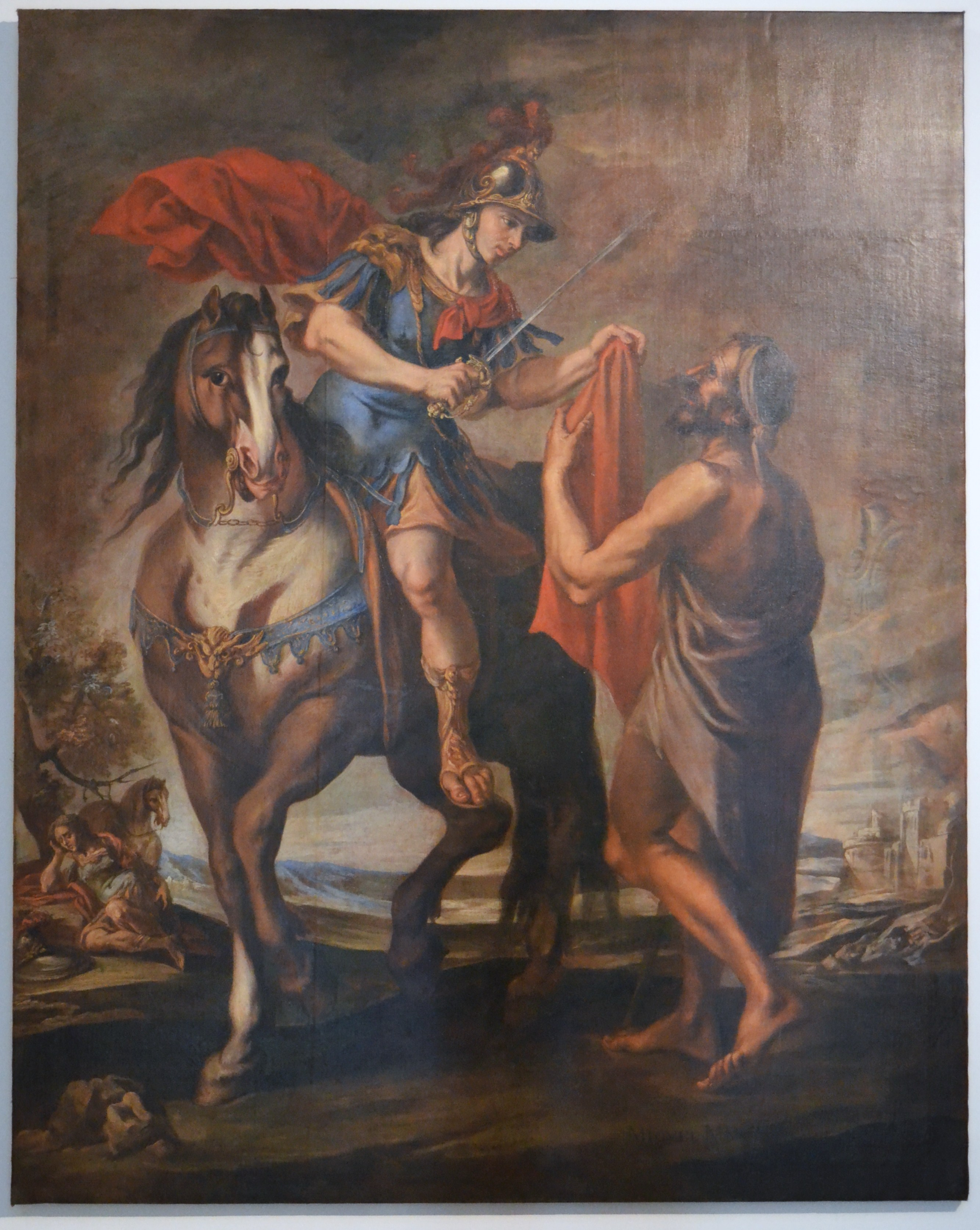
Saint Martin of Tours.

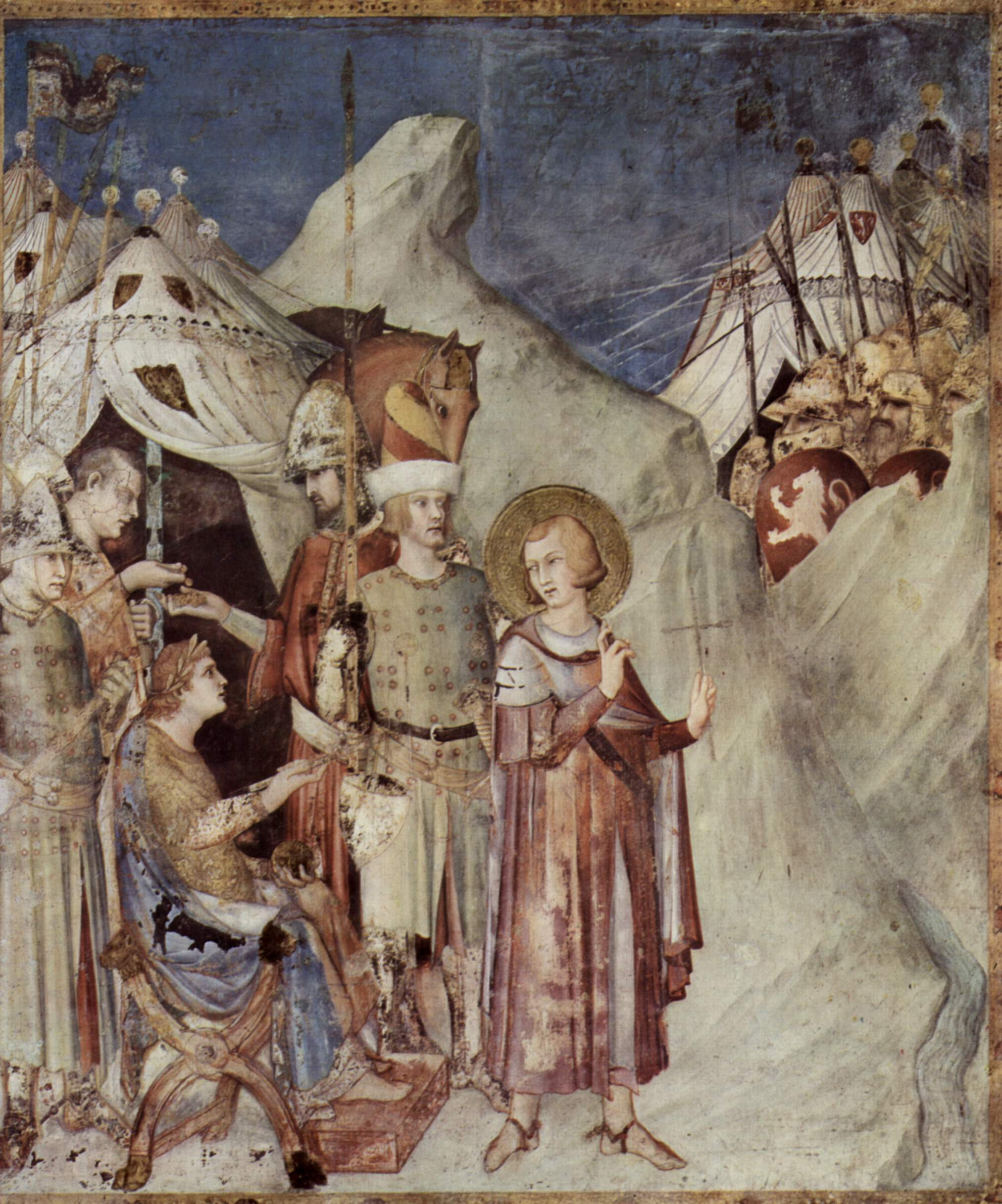
Saint Martin of Tours, patron saint of soldiers, leaves the Roman army. St. Martin is one of the most familiar and recognizable Roman Catholic saints.

Martin may either be a given name or surname. In Scotland, Martin or McMartin is a common surname of Scottish Gaelic origin. Martin is, however, more common as a masculine given name in many languages and cultures. It comes from the Latin name Martinus, which is a late derived form of the name of the Roman god Mars, protective godhead of the Latins and, therefore, god of war.

Martin, along with a range of variant forms mostly of patronymic origin, borne by families descended from someone with the given name of Martin, are seen throughout Europe, though in some instances the Martin surname in England are instead of toponymic origin, coming from one of numerous places called Merton. Martin is the most common French surname and is also frequent in Belgium.

== The name Martin in different regions ==
=== United States ===
Martin was the sixteenth most frequently reported surname in the 1990 United States Census, accounting for 0.27% of the population.

=== Britain ===
==== England ====
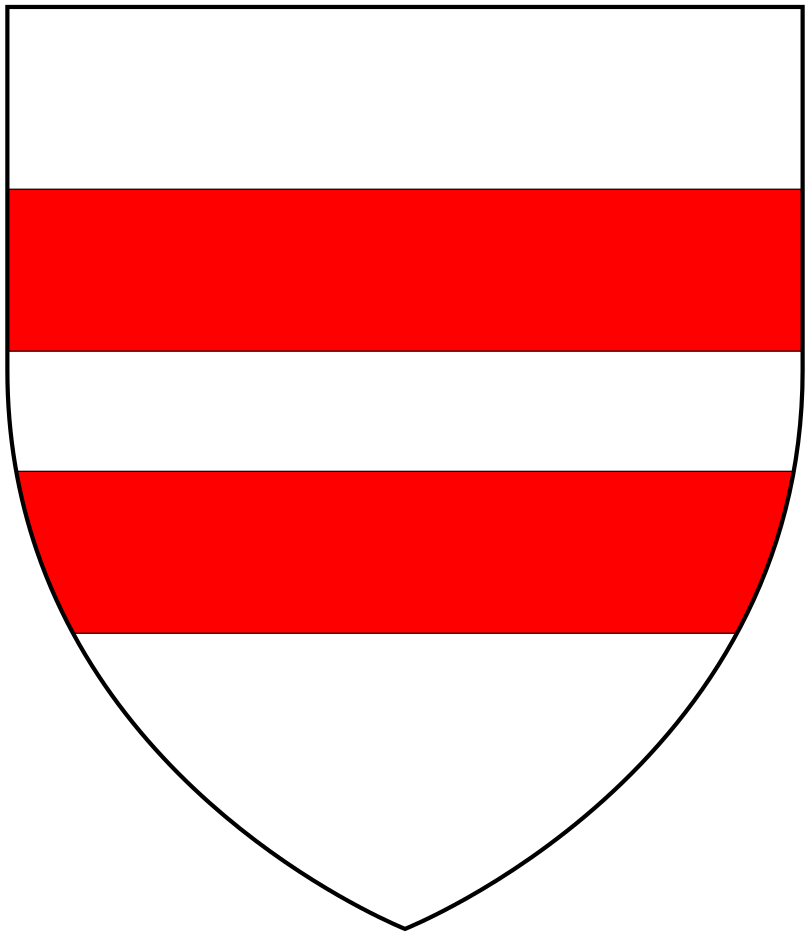
Arms of FitzMartin, later simply Martin, feudal barons of Barnstaple in Devon and Lords of Cemais in Wales: Argent, two bars gules

==== Scotland ====
There are several groups of Martins or Macmartins in Scotland. The MacMartins of Letterfinlay appear to have allied themselves to the Clan Cameron in the late 14th century and finally merged with the Camerons after the Battle of Lochaber in 1429. The MacMartins, who became a sept of Clan Cameron, is said to have been amongst the most loyal and valuable followers of Cameron of Lochiel. In the Jacobite rising of 1745, the MacMartins were "out with" Lochiel's regiment. According to the Oxford Companion to Scottish History, the MacMartins of Letterfinlay who were a sept of the Clan Cameron would have seen themselves as distinct within their own lands, but would have also seen themselves as Camerons if operating elsewhere outside of Lochaber.

There is a branch of MacMartins from Strathclyde. The Martins in Skye are traditionally associated with Clan Donald, and the Lothians were home to a powerful "de St Martin" family from the 12th century.

==== Wales ====
An Anglo-Norman knight named Robert Fitz Martin, born in the late 11th century, settled in England's West Country, on lands inherited from a grandfather, and later participated in the invasions of Wales, where he was awarded the barony of Cemaes, located between Fishguard and Cardigan. Robert fitz Martin established the caput of his barony at Nanhyfer or Nevern. Robert's son William Fitz Robert Fitz Martin (born c. 1155) inherited the family's property and re-established family control over Cemaes, which had been lost to the Welsh. The senior line became extinct in 1326, but cadet lines still flourish in Wales and England.

=== Bulgaria ===
Martin is a highly common first name in Bulgaria. The name is consistently the third most popular baby name. In surname form Martin becomes Martinov, though it's not popular. The name is pronounced the same as English, but with the stress on the second syllable.

=== France ===
With over 230,000 people holding the surname Martin in France, it is the most common French surname. The origins of its frequency can be attributed to Saint Martin of Tours, who was the most popular French saint, but the reason is not clear.

Martin was never a common given name (Christian name) in the Middle Ages, unlike Bernard or Thomas (which were later officialized and became common surnames, nowadays ranking second and third respectively). Onomastics have tried to find other reasons for Martin's popularity, by examining, for example, the repartition of place names, but this explanation also lacks empirical support.

It can be a late surname connected with children of orphanages, like Alexandre, which was never a common first name in the Middle Ages but now appears quite frequently as a surname. Martin can represent charity towards orphans.

| France | Belgium (Wallonia, 2008) |
|---|---|
| 1. Martin | 1. Dubois |
| 2. Bernard | 2. Lambert |
| 3. Dubois | 3. Martin |
| 4. Thomas | 4. Dupont |
| 5. Robert | 5. Simon |

However, this list hides strong regional differences in France and the increasing number of foreign names among the French citizens. Table based on births between 1966 and 1990:

| Basse-Normandie | Alsace | Brittany | PACA | Paris-IdF |
|---|---|---|---|---|
| 1. Marie | 1. Meyer | 1. Le Gall | 1. Martin | 1. Martin |
| 2. Martin | 2. Muller | 2. Thomas | 2. Garcia (Spanish) | 2. Da Silva (Port.) |
| 3. Jeanne | 3. Schmitt | 3. Le Goff | 3. Martinez (Spanish) | 3. Perreira (Port.) |
| 4. Duval | 4. Schneider | 4. Le Roux | 4. Blanc | 4. Petit |
| 5. Lefèvre | 5. Klein | 5. Martin | 5. Fernandez (Spanish) | 5. Dos Santos (Port.) |
| 6. Leroy | 6. Weber | 6. Simon | 6. Lopez (Spanish) | 6. Ferreira (Port.) |
| 7. Hébert | 7. Fischer | 7. Tanguy | 7. Roux | 7. Rodrigues (Port.) |
| 8. Guérin | 8. Martin | 8. Hamon | 8. Sanchez (Spanish) | 8. Dubois |

=== Estonia ===
Martin is a common male name in Estonia – it was the most popular male given name throughout the 1990s. The name currently remains as the second most popular male name in Estonia.

=== Hungary ===
Marton, the Hungarian form of the name, is commonly used as both a first name and surname.

=== Ireland ===
Surnames in Ireland are attested from the mid-10th century. Several distinct families featured the name as a surname element. They included Mac Giolla Mhártain, Ó Maol Mhartain, Ó Martain, Ó Máirtín, Mac Máirtín, Mac Máel Martain. Individuals included Echmílid mac Máel Martain (Bishop of Down to 1202), Giolla Ernain Ó Martain (Irish poet and Chief Ollam of Ireland, died 1218), and Fearghal Ó Martain, O.E.S.A. (Bishop of Killala from 1425 to 1432).

=== Spain ===
Martín (pronounced [maɾˈtin]) is a common given name and is also among the most common surnames in Spain. Its Catalan variant is Martí and in Galician is Martiño. Jewish families in medieval Spain (Sephardic) Jews who remained in Spain and agreed to accept Christianity were asked to change their surnames. One of the names taken up by these Jewish conversos (originally known in Spain as Marranos, but preferred term is 'anusim' which is Hebrew for "forced") was "Martí" (also spelt "Marty"). Sephardic Jews also used Martín or Martínez, as a variation from the Hebrew name Mordecai.

== Surname ==
=== Derived surnames ===
They generally mean "descendant of Martin".

- Marcin, Marcinkiewicz, Marcinowicz in Polish
- Martí (disambiguation) in Catalan
- Martínez, Martines Spanish
- Martins in Portuguese and Galician
- Martini (disambiguation), Martino, Martin, Martinelli, Martinisi, De/Di Martini and De/Di Martino in Italian
- Martini
- Maarten and Martijn (disambiguation) in Dutch
- Martens in German and Dutch
- Martinsson in Swedish
- Martinsen in Danish and Norwegian
- Martinescu in Romanian
- Martinčič in Slovenian
- Martinić and Martinčić in Croatian
- Martinović ( Мартиновић) in Serbian and Croatian
- Martinovics, Hungarian transliteration of Мартиновић
- Martinec in Czech and Croatian
- Martínek in Czech
- Martinov (disambiguation) in Bulgarian
- Marton (disambiguation), Mártonfi/Mártonffy in Hungarian
- Martinsons in Latvian
- McMartin in Scottish
- Martinson in English
- Martyn
- Martynenko, Martyniuk, and Martyniv in Ukrainian
- Martynov, Martynovich, Martinovich in Russian
- Martinavičius, Marcinkevičius, and Martynas in Lithuanian
- Mac Giolla Mhártain (Gilmartin, Kilmartin or Martin): hereditary chiefs in the barony of Clogher, County Tyrone in Ireland and are a branch of the O'Neills
- Ó Máirtín (Martin): Irish clan

=== People with the surname ===
The above list also includes fictional characters.

== Given/first name ==
The above list also includes fictional characters.

== See also ==
- Martina (given name)
- Martina (surname)
- Martijn (given name)
