= Martinussen =

Martinussen is a surname. Notable people with the surname include:

- John Degnbol-Martinussen (1947–2002), Professor of international development at Roskilde University, Denmark
- Karl Martinussen (1890–1965), Norwegian theologian and priest
- Kent Martinussen (born 1960), Danish architect and CEO of the Danish Architecture Centre
- Marie Sneve Martinussen (born 1985), Norwegian politician
- Thomas Martinussen (born 1995), Norwegian football midfielder
- Tillie Martinussen (born 1980), Greenlandic politician of the Cooperation Party
- Willy Martinussen (born 1938), Norwegian sociologist
- Bersvend Martinussen Røkkum (1806–1867), Norwegian politician

== See also ==
- Marteinsson
- Martensen
- Martinsen
- Martinson
- Martinsson
- Mortensen
- Mårtensson
