= De Martino =

De Martino (also styled de Martino or DeMartino) is an Italian surname. Notable people with the surname include:

== De Martino ==
- Alberto De Martino (1929–2015), Italian film director and screenwriter
- Angelo de Martino (a.k.a. Angelo De Martini; 1897–1979), Italian racing cyclist and Olympic medalist
- Antonio De Martino (1815–1904), Italian physician, researcher, and politician
- Daniela De Martino, Australian politician
- Edoardo De Martino (1838–1912), Italian-born British painter
- Ernesto de Martino (1908–1965), Italian anthropologist, philosopher, and historian of religion
- Francesco De Martino (1907–2002), Italian jurist and politician; father of Guido De Martino
- Giacomo De Martino (1868–1957), Swiss-born Italian diplomat and politician
- Giacomo De Martino (governor) (1849–1921), British-born Italian politician and colonial governor
- Giovanni de Martino (1870–1935), Italian sculptor
- Guido De Martino (born 1943), Italian politician; son of Francesco De Martino
- Íñigo de Martino (1905–2006), Mexican screenwriter and film director
- Jules De Martino (born 1967), British musician; member of the pop duo The Ting Tings
- Pietro De Martino (1707–1746), Italian mathematician and astronomer
- Raffaele De Martino (born 1986), Italian footballer
- Stefano De Martino (born 1989), Italian television presenter and former dancer
- Tino De Martino (a.k.a. Tino DeMartino; born ?), Belgian bass guitarist for Channel Zero (band)
- Víctor Amador De Martino (1943–2024), Argentine politician

== DeMartino ==
- Gabi DeMartino [see: Niki and Gabi] (born 1995), American singer, actor, producer, and writer; twin sister of Niki DeMartino
- Nick DeMartino (born 1948), American business executive
- Niki DeMartino [see: Niki and Gabi] (born 1995), American actor, producer, and writer; twin sister of Gabi DeMartino
- Rich DeMartino (born 1939), American contract bridge player
- Tino DeMartino (a.k.a. Tino De Martino; born ?), Belgian bass guitarist for Channel Zero (band)

== In Fiction ==
- Anthony DeMartino, character featured in MTV's animated series Daria (1997–2002)

== See also ==
- Di Martino (surname)
- Martino (disambiguation)
