= Marcin =

Marcin (Polish pronunciation: [ˈmart͡ɕin]) is a male given name or surname. It is the Polish equivalent of the English name Martin; the female version is Martyna.

Notable people with the name Marcin include:

Given name

- Marcin (auxiliary bishop of Kraków) (died 1321), Polish bishop
- Marcin Adamski (born 1975), Polish footballer
- Marcin Awiżeń (born 1985), Polish Paralympian middle distance runner
- Marcin Budkowski (born 1977), Polish Formula One engineer
- Marcin Dorociński (born 1973), Polish actor
- Marcin Gortat (born 1984), Polish basketball player
- Marcin Held (born 1992), Polish mixed martial artist
- Marcin Jakubowski founded Open Source Ecology (OSE) in 2003
- Marcin Kaczmarek (disambiguation), several people
  - Marcin Kaczmarek (footballer) (born 1979), Polish footballer
  - Marcin Kaczmarek (swimmer) (born 1977), Polish butterfly swimmer
- Marcin Kalinowski (1605–1652), Polish nobleman
- Marcin Kleczynski (born 1989), co-founder and CEO of Malwarebytes Inc.
- Marcin Kromer (1512–1583), Polish historian and chronicler, royal secretary, bishop of Warmia
- Marcin Krowicki (1500–1573), Polish Catholic priest
- Marcin Lewandowski (born 1987), Polish 800 m runner
- Marcin Matkowski (born 1981), Polish tennis player
- Marcin Mazurek (born 1998), Polish film music composer
- Marcin Mroziński (born 1981), Polish-English actor, singer and television presenter
- Marcin Nowak (disambiguation), several people
- Marcin Patrzalek (born 2000), Polish guitarist who performs under the name Marcin
- Marcin Odlanicki Poczobutt (1728–1810), Polish-Lithuanian Jesuit astronomer and mathematician
- Marcin Romanowski (born 1976), Polish politician
- Marcin Rożek (1885–1944), Polish sculptor and painter
- Marcin Szudrowicz (born 2004), Polish academic and diplomat
- Marcin Święcicki (born 1947), Polish politician and economist
- Marcin Świetlicki (born 1961), Polish poet, writer, musician
- Marcin of Urzędów (1500–1573), Polish priest, physician, botanist
- Marcin Wicha (1972–2025), Polish graphic designer, children's author, and essayist
- Marcin Wolski (born 1947), Polish writer and satirist
- Marcin of Wrocimowice (died 1442), Polish knight and diplomat

Surname

- Max Marcin (1879–1949), Polish screenwriter and film director
- Matúš Marcin (born 1994), Slovak professional footballer
