= Martinek =

Martinek or Martínek (feminine: Martínková) is a surname of Polish and Czech origin. Spelling variants include Martineck and Martyniak. Notable people with the surname include:

- Alexander Martinek (1919–1944), Austrian football player
- Krystian Martinek (born 1948), German actor
- Hana Martínková (born 1985), Czech handball player
- Irena Martínková (born 1986), Czech football player
- Jan Martyniak (born 1939) Polish bishop
- János Martinek (born 1965), Hungarian athlete
- Joe Martinek (born 1989), American football player
- Lisa Martinek (1972–2019), German actress
- Lucie Martínková (born 1986), Czech football player
- Petr Martínek (born 1972), Czech ice hockey player
- Radek Martínek (born 1976), Czech ice hockey player
- Robert Martinek (1889–1944), Austrian general
- Rostislav Martynek (born 1982), Czech ice hockey player
- Sophia Martineck (born 1981), German illustrator
- Susanna Martinková (born 1946), Czech actress
- Sven Martinek (born 1964), German actor
- Veronika Martinek (born 1972), German tennis player

== See also ==
- Martinac (disambiguation)
- Martinec
- Marcinek (disambiguation)
- Marciniak
