= Martinas =

Martinas is a given name. Notable people with the name include:

- Martinas Geben (born 1994), Lithuanian basketball player
- Martinas Rankin (born 1994), American football player

== See also ==
- Martina (given name)
- Martinat
- Martynas
