= Di Martino =

Di Martino (also styled di Martino or DiMartino) is a surname. Notable people with the surname include:

== Di Martino ==
- Antonio Di Martino (born 1982), Italian singer-songwriter
- Antonietta Di Martino (born 1978), Italian high jumper and Olympic competitor
- Gian Carlo di Martino (born 1964), Venezuelan politician and lawyer
- Jean-François Di Martino (born 1967), French fencer and Olympic medalist
- Leopoldo Di Martino (born 1949), Italian racing sailor and Olympic competitor
- Lorenzo di Niccolò di Martino (fl.1391–1412), Italian painter
- Pietro Di Martino (a.k.a. Pietro De Martino; 1707–1746), Italian mathematician and astronomer
- Sophia Di Martino (born 1983), British actor

== DiMartino ==
- Christina DiMartino (born 1986), American soccer player; sister of Gina and Vicki DiMartino
- Gina DiMartino (born 1988), American soccer player; sister of Christina and Vicki DiMartino
- Lisa DiMartino, American politician
- Michael Dante DiMartino (born 1974), American animation director, producer, story editor, and author
- Nick DiMartino (born 1946), author, playwright, book reviewer, and bookseller
- Vicki DiMartino (born 1991), American soccer player; sister of Christina and Gina DiMartino
- Vincent DiMartino (born 1972), American motorcycle designer and builder

== See also ==
- De Martino (surname)
- Martino (disambiguation)
