= Martina =

Martina may refer to:

== People ==
- Martina (given name), a female form of Martin, including a list of people with the given name Martina
- Martina (surname), a surname found in Italy and Curaçao
- Martina (empress), the second Empress consort of the Byzantine Empire

== Sport ==
- A.S.D. Martina Calcio 1947, football club based in Martina Franca, Italy
- LCF Martina, a futsal club based in Martina Franca, Italy

== Places ==
- Martina Franca, a municipality in the province of Taranto, Italy
- Martina, Switzerland, a village in the Grisons
- Martina, Croatia, a village near Mošćenička Draga

== Other ==
- Martina (album), a 2003 album by Martina McBride
- Martina (film), a 1949 West German drama film
- Martina (tunnel boring machine), a hard rock tunnel boring machine
- 981 Martina, an asteroid
- La Martina, Argentine sportswear company and sponsor of international polo
