= Marcinek =

Marcinek may refer to:

- Marcinek, Greater Poland Voivodeship, a place in Poland
- Ewa Marcinek (fl. from 2020), Polish-Icelandic writer
- Marcinek, a puppet theatre in Poznań, Poland, art director Leokadia Serafinowicz 1960–1980
- Marcinek Award, of the Ale Kino! International Young Audience Film Festival
- Marcinek, a dessert in Polish cuisine

== See also ==
- Martinek, a surname
