= Martyn (given name) =

Martyn (/ˈmɑːrtɪn/ MAR-tin) is a given name which may refer to:

- Martyn (musician) (born 1975), Dutch DJ
- Martyn Bennett (1971–2005), Scottish musician
- Martyn Bennett (footballer) (born 1961), English footballer
- Martyn Brabbins (born 1959), British conductor
- Martyn Buchwald (1942–2018), birth name of American singer-songwriter Marty Balin
- Martyn Lawrence Bullard (born 1967), English interior designer, author and television personality
- Martyn P. Casey (born 1960), English-born Australian bass guitarist
- Martyn Evans (disambiguation), several people
- Martyn Finlay (1912–1999), New Zealand politician
- Martyn Gough (chaplain) (1966–2023), British military chaplain
- Martyn Green (1899–1975), English actor and singer
- Martyn Jacques (born 1959), English musician, front man of The Tiger Lillies
- Martyn Jones (disambiguation), several people
- Martyn Joseph (born 1960), Welsh singer-songwriter
- Sir Martyn Lewis (born 1945), Welsh TV presenter and journalist
- Martyn Lewis (badminton) (born 1982), Welsh badminton player
- Martyn Littlewood (born 1990) English YouTuber known as InTheLitteWood
- Martyn Margetson (born 1971), Welsh professional footballer
- Martyn Moxon (born 1960), English cricketer
- Martyn Poliakoff (born 1947), British chemist
- Martyn Quayle (1959–2016), Manx politician
- Martyn Rooney (born 1987), English sprinter
- Martyn Smith (disambiguation), several people
- Martyn Snow (born 1968), British bishop
- Martyn Waghorn (born 1990), English footballer
- Martyn Ware (born 1956), British musician and music producer
- Martyn Williams (born 1975), Welsh international rugby union player
- Martyn Huw Williams (born 1947), Welsh journalist and broadcaster
- Martyn Woolford (born 1985), English footballer

== See also ==
- Martyn (surname)
- Martin (name)
- Martijn (given name), Dutch spelling of the same name
