= Martino (surname) =

Martino is an Italian surname. Notable people with the surname include:

- Al Martino (1927–2009), American singer
- Ángelo Martino (born 1998), Argentine footballer
- Ayrton Martino (born 2002), Canadian ice hockey player
- Bruno Martino (1925–2000), Italian composer, singer, and pianist
- Claudio Martino (1910–1979), Argentine actor
- Donald Martino (1931–2005), American composer
- Freddie Martino (born 1991), American football player
- Gerardo Martino (born 1962), Argentine football manager
- John Martino, American gangster
- Kyle Martino (1981–), American footballer
- Luciano Martino (1933–2013), Italian film producer, director and screenwriter
- Ludovica Martino (born 1997), Italian actress
- Marilyn Martino, Venezuelan politician
- Miranda Martino (1933–), Italian singer and actress
- Pat Martino (1944–2021), American jazz guitarist
- Renato Martino (1932–2024), Italian Cardinal
- Rinaldo Martino (1921–2000), Argentine-Italian footballer
- Rocco Martino, (born 1938), Italian involved in Niger uranium forgeries prior to the War in Iraq
- Sergio Martino (1938–), Italian director and screenwriter
- Steve Martino (1959–), American director
- Tonino Martino (born 1969), Italian footballer

== See also ==
- Martino (disambiguation)
- Martin (surname)
- Martini (surname)
- Martino (given name)
