= Martinat =

Martinat is a surname. Notable people with the surname include:

- Giulio Martinat (1891–1943), Italian general
- Ugo Martinat (1942–2009), Italian politician

== See also ==
- Martina (given name)
- Martinas
