= Martynenko =

Martynenko (Ukrainian: Мартиненко; Russian: Мартыненко) is a Ukrainian surname, derived from the given name Martin. Notable people with the surname include:

- Ihor Martynenko (born 1970), Ukrainian rower
- Mykola Martynenko (born 1961), Ukrainian politician
- Oleksandr Martynenko (disambiguation), multiple individuals
- Vladimir Martynenko (born 1957), Russian sociologist
- Volodymyr Martynenko (1923–1988), Ukrainian diplomat
- Yevhen Martynenko (born 1993), Ukrainian footballer
