= Serhiy Rakhmanin =

Ukrainian journalist and politician

- Сергій Рахманін
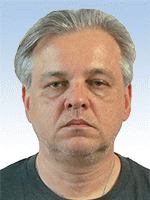
- Official portrait, 2019

People's Deputy of Ukraine
- Incumbent
- Assumed office 29 August 2019
- Constituency: Holos, No. 8

Personal details
- Born: 17 April 1969 (age 57) Kharkiv, Ukrainian SSR, Soviet Union (now Ukraine)
- Party: Holos
- Spouse: Kira Ivashova
- Education: Taras Shevchenko National University of Kyiv

Military service
- Allegiance: Ukraine
- Branch/service: Ukrainian Ground Forces
- Years of service: 1993

Serhiy Ivanovych Rakhmanin (Ukrainian: Сергій Іванович Рахманін; born 17 April 1969) is a Ukrainian journalist and politician currently serving as a People's Deputy of Ukraine on the proportional list of the Holos party since 2019. Prior to his election, he was the deputy chief editor at Dzerkalo Tyzhnia and a reporter for other Ukrainian news programmes.

== Early life and journalist activities ==
Serhiy Ivanovych Rakhmanin was born 17 April 1969 in the city of Kharkiv, in eastern Ukraine. He began working as a journalist at a young age, working as an editor for the Kyiv-based Young Guard newspaper from 1983 to 1987. He became a freelance correspondent for the newspaper in 1989, and a correspondent in 1991, continuing for a year.

Rakhmanin studied at Taras Shevchenko National University of Kyiv's journalism faculty from 1986 to 1993. Following his graduation, he served as a conscript in the Ukrainian Ground Forces. He was deputy chief editor for the Russian-language Kievskiye Vedomosti from 1992 to 1998, having previously worked at the Ranok journal briefly in 1992.

In October 1998 Rakhmanin began working at the Dzerkalo Tyzhnia weekly newspaper. In recognition of his journalistic achievements, he was awarded the "Journalist of the Year" award in 1997 (along with Yulia Mostova, Oleksandr Martynenko, and Mykola Kanishevskyi), 1999 (along with Mostova and Viacheslav Pikhovshek), and 2001 (along with Volodymyr Katsman and Andriy Tsaplienko). Rakhmanin was additionally a runner-up to the Georgiy Gongadze Award for journalism in 2019, losing to Vakhtang Kipiani.

From 2014 to 2019 Rakhmanin was host of the "Game of Hopscotch" news programme on ZIK. In 2018 he also joined The New Voice of Ukraine's radio service.

Rakhmanin discovered an audio surveillance device in the offices of Dzerkalo Tyzhnia in December 2017. The discovery came two months after the Ukrainska Pravda newspaper had previously discovered their offices had been bugged for over a year.

== Political career ==
Following the adoption of the law "On the Principles of State Language Policy" in 2012, Rakhmanin participated in a hunger strike as part of the Language Maidan protests against the bill. During his hunger strike, Rakhmanin suffered a heart attack.

Rakhmanin first came into contact with musician Sviatoslav Vakarchuk in 2014, participating in his People of the Future charity foundation. Prior to his own political career, Rakhmanin was an assistant to People's Deputies of Ukraine Viktor Musiyaka and Volodymyr Filenko.

=== People's Deputy of Ukraine ===
In the 2019 Ukrainian parliamentary election Rakhmanin was the eighth candidate on the party list of the Holos party, led by Vakarchuk. Rakhmanin acquired attention during the election for claiming that the Servant of the People party could come under the influence of oligarchs, namely Viktor Medvedchuk. Rakhmanin was successfully elected into the Verkhovna Rada (Ukraine's parliament).

Following his election, Rakhmanin was appointed to the Verkhovna Rada Committee on National Security, Defence, and Intelligence. From 29 August 2019 to 28 December 2020 he was also head of Holos' faction in the Verkhovna Rada.

Rakhmanin voted for the removal of Arsen Avakov as Minister of Internal Affairs. Following the beginning of the Russian invasion of Ukraine he called for Chairman of the Verkhovna Rada Ruslan Stefanchuk to support legislation removing any members of the legislature who had been affiliated with pro-Russian parties prior to the invasion.

Rakhmanin has expressed the belief that the Russo-Ukrainian War will be a protracted conflict, saying in October 2023 that there was "no reason to say" that active fighting would end before 2025. He also stated doubts that the Battle of Bakhmut could end in Ukrainian victory, while noting that the battle could be used to inflict as many casualties and materiel losses on Russia as possible.

== Personal life ==
Rakhmanin is married to Kira Yuriivna Ivashova, and the couple has two daughters; Varvara (born 1996) and Yustyna (born 2005).
