= Van Lieshout =

Van Lieshout is a Dutch toponymic surname, meaning "from Lieshout", a town in North Brabant. People with the surname include:

- Cilia van Lieshout (1941–2023), Dutch film producer
- Erik van Lieshout (born 1968), Dutch installation artist
- Eustáquio van Lieshout (1890–1943), Dutch missionary in Brazil
- Henry van Lieshout (1932–2009), Papua New Guinean Roman Catholic bishop
- Joep van Lieshout (born 1963), Dutch artist
- John Van Lieshout (born 1946), Australian billionaire
- Johan van Lieshout (born 1969), Dutch javelin thrower
- Maarten Van Lieshout (born 1985), Belgian footballer
- Ted van Lieshout (born 1955), Dutch writer, poet, screenwriter and illustrator
- Teresa van Lieshout (born 1971), Australian perennial candidate

Trixie van Lieshout (born 1948), Matildas Coach 1981
