= Maarten =

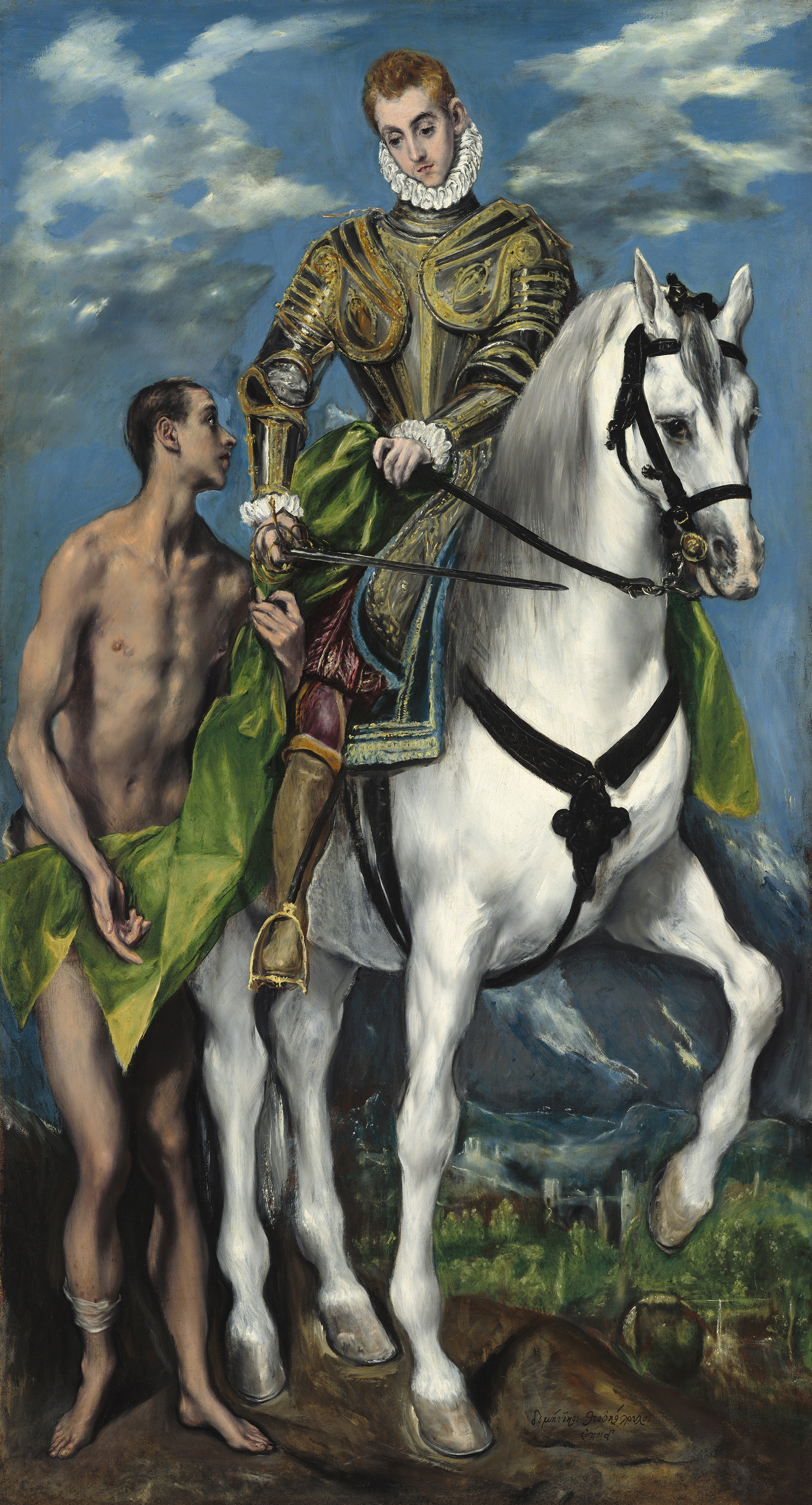
- Saint Martin and the Beggar by El Greco
- Pronunciation: [ˈmaːrtə(n)]
- Gender: Male
- Language: Dutch

Origin
- Origin: Popularized by St. Martinus
- Region of origin: Netherlands, Flanders

Other names
- Alternative spelling: Maerten (archaic spelling)
- Variant forms: Marten, Martijn, Martien, Martin, Martinus
- Nicknames: Mart, Maart, Maartje, Mert
- Derived: The Roman name Martinus, ultimately from the name of the Roman god Mars
- Related names: Martin

Maarten (IPA: [ˈmaːrtə(n)]) is a Dutch language male given name. It is a cognate to and the standardized Dutch form of Martin, as in for example Sint Maarten (named after Martin of Tours).

People bearing the name include:

- Maarten Altena (born 1943), Dutch composer and contrabassist
- Maarten Arens (born 1972), Dutch judoka
- Maarten Atmodikoro (born 1971), Dutch retired footballer
- Maarten Baas (born 1978), Dutch furniture designer
- Maarten Biesheuvel (1939–2020), Dutch writer of short stories and novellas
- Maarten Boddaert (born 1989), Dutch footballer
- Maarten Boudry (born 1984), Flemish philosopher and skeptic
- Maarten Bouwknecht (born 1994), Dutch basketball player
- Maarten Brzoskowski (born 1995), Dutch swimmer
- Maarten J. M. Christenhusz (born 1976), Dutch botanist and plant photographer
- Maarten de Bruijn (born 1965), Dutch engineer
- Maarten de Jonge (born 1985), Dutch former racing cyclist
- Maarten de Niet Gerritzoon (1904–1979), Dutch politician
- Maarten de Wit (1883–1955), Dutch sailor who competed in the 1928 Summer Olympics
- Maarten den Bakker (born 1969), Dutch retired racing cyclist
- Maarten Ducrot, Dutch former racing cyclist and currently cycling reporter
- Maarten Dirk van Renesse van Duivenbode (1804–1878), Dutch merchant
- Maarten Froger (born 1977), Dutch former field hockey striker
- Maarten Hajer (born 1962), Dutch political scientist and urban and regional planner
- Maarten Haverkamp (born 1974), Dutch former politician
- Maarten Heijmans (born 1983), Dutch actor
- Maarten Heisen (born 1984), Dutch sprinter
- Maarten Houttuyn (1720–1798), Dutch naturalist
- Maarten Jansen (born 1952), Dutch archaeologist, professor of Mesoamerican archaeology and history
- Maarten Kloosterman (born 1942), Dutch retired rower
- Maarten Krabbé (1908–2005), Dutch painter and art educator
- Maarten Lafeber (born 1974), Dutch golfer
- Maarty Leunen (born 1985), American basketball player
- Maarten Maartens, pen name of Dutch writer Jozua Marius Willem van der Poorten Schwartz (1858–1915)
- Maarten Martens (born 1984), Belgian football coach and former player
- Maarten Meiners (born 1992), Dutch alpine ski racer
- Maarten Neyens (born 1985), Belgian racing cyclist
- Maarten Rudelsheim (1873–1920), Dutch-Flemish political activist
- Maarten Schakel Jr. (born 1947), Dutch politician
- Maarten Schakel Sr. (1917–1997), Dutch politician
- Maarten Schenck van Nydeggen (1540?–1589), Dutch military commander
- Maarten Schmidt (1929–2022), Dutch astronomer
- Maarten Stekelenburg (born 1982), Dutch retired football goalkeeper
- Maarten Stekelenburg (footballer, born 1972), Dutch football manager and former player
- Maarten Swings (born 1988), Belgian speed skater (inline and ice)
- Maarten 't Hart (born 1944), Dutch writer
- Maarten Tjallingii (born 1977), Dutch former racing cyclist
- Maarten Treurniet (born 1959), Dutch film director
- Maarten Tromp (1598–1653), Dutch admiral
- J. Maarten Troost (born 1969), Dutch-American travel writer and essayist
- Maarten van den Bergh (born 1942), Dutch businessman
- Maarten van den Hove (1605–1639), Dutch astronomer
- Maarten van der Goes van Dirxland (1751–1826), Dutch politician
- Maarten van der Linden (born 1969), Dutch former rower
- Maarten van der Vleuten (born 1967), Dutch producer, composer and recording artist
- Maarten van der Weijden (born 1981), Dutch long-distance and marathon swimmer
- Maarten van Dulm (1879–1949), vice-admiral of the Royal Dutch Navy and Olympic fencer
- Maarten van Garderen (born 1990), Dutch volleyball player
- Maarten van Gent (1947–2025), Dutch basketball coach, scout and businessman
- Maarten van Grimbergen (born 1959), Dutch former field hockey player
- Maarten van Heemskerck (1498–1574), Dutch painter
- Maarten Van Lieshout (born 1985), Belgian footballer
- Maarten van Roozendaal (1962–2013), Dutch singer
- Maarten van Rossem (born 1943), Dutch historian
- Maarten van Rossum (c. 1478–1555), Dutch field marshal
- Maarten van Severen (1956–2005), Belgian furniture designer
- Maarten Gerritszoon Vries (1589–1647), Dutch explorer and cartographer
- Maarten Vrolijk (1919–1994), Dutch politician
- Maarten Wevers (born 1952), New Zealand diplomat and public servant
- Maarten Wynants (born 1982), Belgian former racing cyclist

== See also ==
- Martijn, a given name, another common Dutch cognate of Martin
