= Martino =

Martino may refer to:

== Places ==
- Martino, Kardzhali Province, in Kardzhali Municipality, Bulgaria
- Martino, Phthiotis, a village in central Greece

== People ==
- Martino (given name)
- Martino (surname)
- Martin of Tours (316–397), one of a dozen saints bearing the name Martino in Italian
- Martino da Como, 15th-century culinary maestro (born ca. 1430)
- Pope Martin V (c. 1368–1431)

== See also ==
- Martin (name)
- Martin (disambiguation)
- Martini (disambiguation)
- Martineau, a surname
- San Martino (disambiguation)
