= Martijn =

Martijn (Dutch pronunciation: [mɑrˈtɛin]), occasionally written as Martyn, Martain or Martein, is a Dutch given name. It is a cognate of Martin, and ultimately derived from the Roman Martinus.
In Icelandic, the name is written as Marteinn. The feminine form is Martina.

== Martijn ==
- Martijn Bolkestein (born 1972), Dutch politician
- Martijn Buijsse (born 1981), Dutch politician
- Martijn Garritsen (born 1996), Dutch musician
- Martijn Krabbé (born 1968), Dutch actor
- Martijn Maaskant (born 1983), Dutch racing cyclist
- Martijn Meerdink (born 1976), Dutch association football player
- Martijn Meeuwis (born 1982), Dutch baseball player
- Martijn Monteyne (born 1984), Belgian association football player
- Martijn Padding (born 1956), Dutch composer
- Martijn Reuser (born 1975), Dutch association football player
- Martijn Spierenburg (born 1975), Dutch keyboardist
- Martijn ten Velden, Dutch DJ and music producer
- Martijn van Dam (born 1978), Dutch engineer and politician
- Martijn van Helvert (born 1978), Dutch politician
- Martijn van der Laan (born 1988), Dutch association football player
- Martijn van der Linden (born 1979), Dutch illustrator
- Martijn van Oostrum (born 1976), Dutch judoka
- Martijn Westerholt (born 1979), Dutch keyboardist and songwriter
- Martijn Wydaeghe (born 1992), Belgian rallying co-driver
- Martijn Zuijdweg (born 1976), Dutch freestyle swimmer

== Marteinn ==
- Marteinn Einarsson (died 1576), Icelandic bishop of Skálholt
- Marteinn Geirsson (born 1951), Icelandic footballer

== See also ==
- Maarten, another Dutch cognate of Martin
- Martin (name)
- Martyn (given name)
- Vereniging Martijn, Dutch pro-pedophile organization
