= Martinsson =

Martinsson is a surname. Notable people with the surname include:

- Barbro Martinsson (born 1935), former Swedish cross-country skier
- Emil Martinsson (born 1979), Swedish sport shooter
- Eric Martinsson (born 1992), Swedish professional ice hockey defenceman
- Fridolf Martinsson (1914–1972), Swedish footballer
- Gunnar Martinsson, Swedish footballer
- Mikael Martinsson (born 1966), Swedish former footballer
- Mikael Martinsson (ski jumper) (born 1968), Swedish former ski jumper
- Örjan Martinsson (1936–1997), Swedish footballer
- Rebecka Martinsson, fictional heroine in novels by Åsa Larsson (born 1966), a Swedish crime-fiction writer
- Roland Poirier Martinsson (born 1962), author, conservative philosopher and broadcaster from Sweden, now living in Austin, Texas
- Rolf Martinsson (born 1956), Swedish composer
- Sven Martinsson (born 1935), retired Swedish bobsledder
- Tony Martinsson (born 1966), former footballer and coach
- Serge-Junior Martinsson Ngouali (born 1992), Gabonese footballer

== See also ==
- Martinson
- Marteinsson
- Martin Olsson
