= Martinov =

Martinov may refer to:

- Martinov (Ostrava) – district of Ostrava, Czech Republic
- Martinov (Záryby) – part of the village of Záryby, Czech Republic
- Martinov Russian Botanist
