= Marteen =

Marteen may refer to:

- Marteen (American singer) (born 2001 as Marteen Estevez), American singer and songwriter
- Marteen (Russian singer) (born 2003 as Mikhail Alekseevich 'Misha' Smirnov), Russian singer and record producer
- David Marteen (fl. 1651-1672), Dutch privateer and pirate
- Rachel Jean Marteen, Playboy model

== See also ==
- Maarten (disambiguation)
