= Martensen =

Martensen or Mårtensen is a surname. Notable people with the surname include:

- Camilla Mårtensen (born 1970), Swedish politician
- Hans Lassen Martensen (1808–1884), Danish Luterhan bishop and academic
- Hans Ludvig Martensen (1927–2012), Danish Roman Catholic bishop
- Robert Martensen (1947–2013), American physician, historian and writer

== See also ==
- Martinson
- Mortensen
