= Martinović =

Martinović (Serbian Cyrillic: Mартиновић) is a patronymic surname meaning 'son of Martin', and is a common surname in Bosnia and Herzegovina, Croatia, Montenegro and Serbia. Its Hungarian form is Martinovics.

It is also the surname of a Montenegrin aristocratic dynasty, the Martinovitch-Orlovitch, named after its dynastic founder, Martin Orlović, during the former days of the royal state, as well as one of the clans of Montenegro. To this day the tradition of the burning of the Badnjak (oak branch) outside the Cetinje Monastery in celebration of Orthodox Christmas is performed by a member of the Martinovići.

Notable people with the surname include:

- Aleksandar Martinović (born 1976), Serbian lawyer and politician
- Alexandre Martinović (born 1985), French-born Montenegrin footballer
- Anica Martinović (born 1976), married Kovač, Croatian model
- Branislav Martinović (1937–2015), Serbian wrestler
- Danijela Martinović (born 1971), Croatian singer
- Darko Martinović (born 1982), Bosnian-Herzegovinian handball player
- Dejan Martinović (born 1983), Bosnian-Herzegovinian and Croatian footballer
- Dino Martinović (born 1990), Croatian-born Slovenian footballer
- Dominik Martinović (born 1997), German-born Croatian footballer
- Dušan Martinović (born 1987), Serbian footballer
- Đorđe Martinović (1929–2000), Serbian farmer from Kosovo
- Ignác Martinovics (1755–1795), Hungarian scholar and secret agent of Serbian or Albanian descent
- Ilija Martinović (born 1994), Montenegrin footballer
- Ivan Martinović (swimmer) (born 2001), Serbian artistic swimmer
- Ivan Martinović (handballer) (born 1999), Croatian handball player
- Jovo Martinović, Montenegrin journalist
- Marija Martinović (born 1979), now Šestak, Serbian-born Slovenian athlete
- Maša Martinović (born 1989), now Vidić, Croatian karate athlete
- Milan Martinović (born 1979), Serbian footballer
- Mitar Martinović (1870–1954), Montenegrin army officer
- Nada Martinović (born 1967), Serbian-American music pedagogue
- Novak Martinović (born 1985), Serbian footballer
- Ratimir Martinović, Montenegrin pianist
- Sandra Martinović (born 1979), Bosnian-Herzegovinian tennis player
- Saša Martinović (ice hockey player) (born 1984), Croatian professional ice hockey player
- Saša Martinović (chess player) (born 1991), Croatian chess grandmaster
- Savo Martinović (born 1935), Serbian satirist
- Siniša Martinović (born 1980), Croatian ice hockey player
- Slobodan Martinović (1945–2015), Serbian chess player
- Snježana Martinović (born 1967), Bosnian-Herzegovinian actress
- Vasilije Martinović (born 2003), Serbian water polo player
- Vesna Martinović (born 1970), Serbian politician
- Vladimir Martinović (born 1973), Serbian footballer
- Vlasti Martinovic (born 2004), Romanian footballer
- Vuk Martinović (born 1989), Montenegrin footballer

== See also ==
- Martinovich
- Martynovich
- Martinić
