= Oleksandr Martynenko =

Oleksandr Martynenko may refer to:

- Oleksandr Martynenko (cyclist) (born 1989), Ukrainian cyclist
- Oleksandr Martynenko (journalist) (1960–2024), Ukrainian journalist
