= Marcinkevičius =

Marcinkevičius is the masculine form of a Lithuanian surname. Its feminine forms are Marcinkevičienė (married woman or widow) and Marcinkevičiūtė (unmarried woman). Notable people with the surname include:

- Justinas Marcinkevičius (1930-2011), Lithuanian poet and playwright
- Vilmantas Marcinkevičius (born 1969), Lithuanian painter

== See also ==
- Marcinkiewicz
- Martinkevich
- Martsinkevich
