= Mārtiņš =

Male given name

- Gender: Male
- Name day: 10 November

Origin
- Region of origin: Latvia

Other names
- Related names: Mārcis, Martin

Mārtiņš is a Latvian masculine given name. It is a cognate of the name Martin.

Mārtiņš may refer to:

- Mārtiņš, ancient Latvian deity
- Mārtiņš Antons (1888–1941), Latvian lawyer and politician
- Mārtiņš Bondars (born 1971), Latvian financier, politician, and basketball player
- Mārtiņš Bots (born 1999), Latvian luger
- Mārtiņš Brauns (1951–2021), Latvian composer and musician
- Mārtiņš Cipulis (born 1980), Latvian ice hockey left winger
- Mārtiņš Freimanis (1977–2011), Latvian musician, singer, songwriter, actor and TV personality
- Rūsiņš Mārtiņš Freivalds (1942–2016), Latvian computer scientist and mathematician
- Mārtiņš Grundmanis (1913–1944), Latvian basketball player
- Mārtiņš Karsums (born 1986), Latvian professional ice hockey player
- Mārtiņš Ķibilds (1973–2019), Latvian journalist and television personality
- Mārtiņš Kravčenko (born 1985), Latvian professional basketball guard
- Mārtiņš Krūmiņš (1900–1992), Latvian-born American Impressionist painter
- Mārtiņš Laksa (born 1990), Latvian professional basketball player
- Mārtiņš Līcis (born 1990), Latvian-American professional strongman
- Mārtiņš Mazūrs (1908–1995), Latvian cyclist and Olympic competitor
- Mārtiņš Meiers (born 1991), Latvian professional basketball player
- Mārtiņš Nukša (1878–1942), Latvian diplomat and architect
- Mārtiņš Onskulis (born 1994), Latvian alpine skier and Olympic competitor
- Mārtiņš Peniķis (1874–1964), Latvian military general and commander in chief of Latvian Army
- Mārtiņš Pļaviņš (born 1985), Latvian beach volleyball player and Olympic medalist
- Mārtiņš Pluto (born 1998), Latvian racing cyclist
- Mārtiņš Podžus (born 1994), Latvian tennis player
- Mārtiņš Porejs (born 1991), Latvian ice hockey player
- Mārtiņš Raitums (born 1985), Latvian ice hockey goaltender
- Mārtiņš Rītiņš (1949–2022), Latvian chef, businessman and culinary TV presenter
- Mārtiņš Roze (1964–2012), Latvian politician
- Mārtiņš Rubenis (born 1978), Latvian luger and Olympic medalist
- Mārtiņš Saulespurēns (born ????), Latvian inventor and engineer
- Mārtiņš Sesks (born 1999), Latvian rally driver
- Mārtiņš Sirmais (born 1982), Latvian orienteering competitor
- Mārtiņš Skirmants (born 1977), Latvian basketball player
- Mārtiņš Zībarts (born 1974), Latvian basketball coach
- Mārtiņš Zīverts (1903–1990), Latvian playwright

== See also ==
- Martins (surname)
