= Maartje (name) =

Maartje is a Dutch feminine given name, a diminutive of the names Martina and Marthinus. People with the name include:

- Maartje Boudeling (born 1939), Dutch chef
- Maartje Goderie (born 1984), Dutch field hockey player
- Maartje Köster (born 1975), Dutch cricketer
- Maartje Nevejan, Dutch filmmaker
- Maartje Offers (1891–1944), Dutch classical singer
- Maartje Paumen (born 1985), Dutch field hockey player
- Maartje Scheepstra (born 1980), Dutch field hockey player
- Maartje van Putten (born 1951), Dutch politician
- Maartje Verhoef (born 1997), Dutch fashion model

== See also ==
- 1353 Maartje, main-belt asteroid
