= Martyniuk =

Martyniuk (Polish), Мартинюк (Ukrainian, transcribed as Martyniuk), or Мартынюк (Russian, transcribed as Martynyuk) is a patronimical surname of Ukrainian origin, it means son of Martyn.

- Alexander Martynyuk (1945–2022), ice hockey player who played for the Soviet Hockey League
- Dave Martyniuk, fictional character in Guy Gavriel Kay's fantasy trilogy "The Fionavar Tapestry"
- Fedor Martyanovych Martyniuk (1918–1996), president of the Football Federation of the Ukrainian SSR
- Georgy Martyniuk (1940–2014), Russian actor
- Leonid Martynyuk (born 1978), Russian opposition journalist
- Nikolai Martynyuk (1934–2021), Soviet and Russian naval officer
- Teodor Martyniuk (born 1974), Ukrainian Greek Catholic hierarch.
- Wacław Martyniuk (born 1949), Polish politician
- Yaroslav Martynyuk (born 1989), Ukrainian football midfielder
- Zenon Martyniuk (born 1969), Polish singer and guitarist
