= Interfax-Ukraine =

Ukrainian news agency

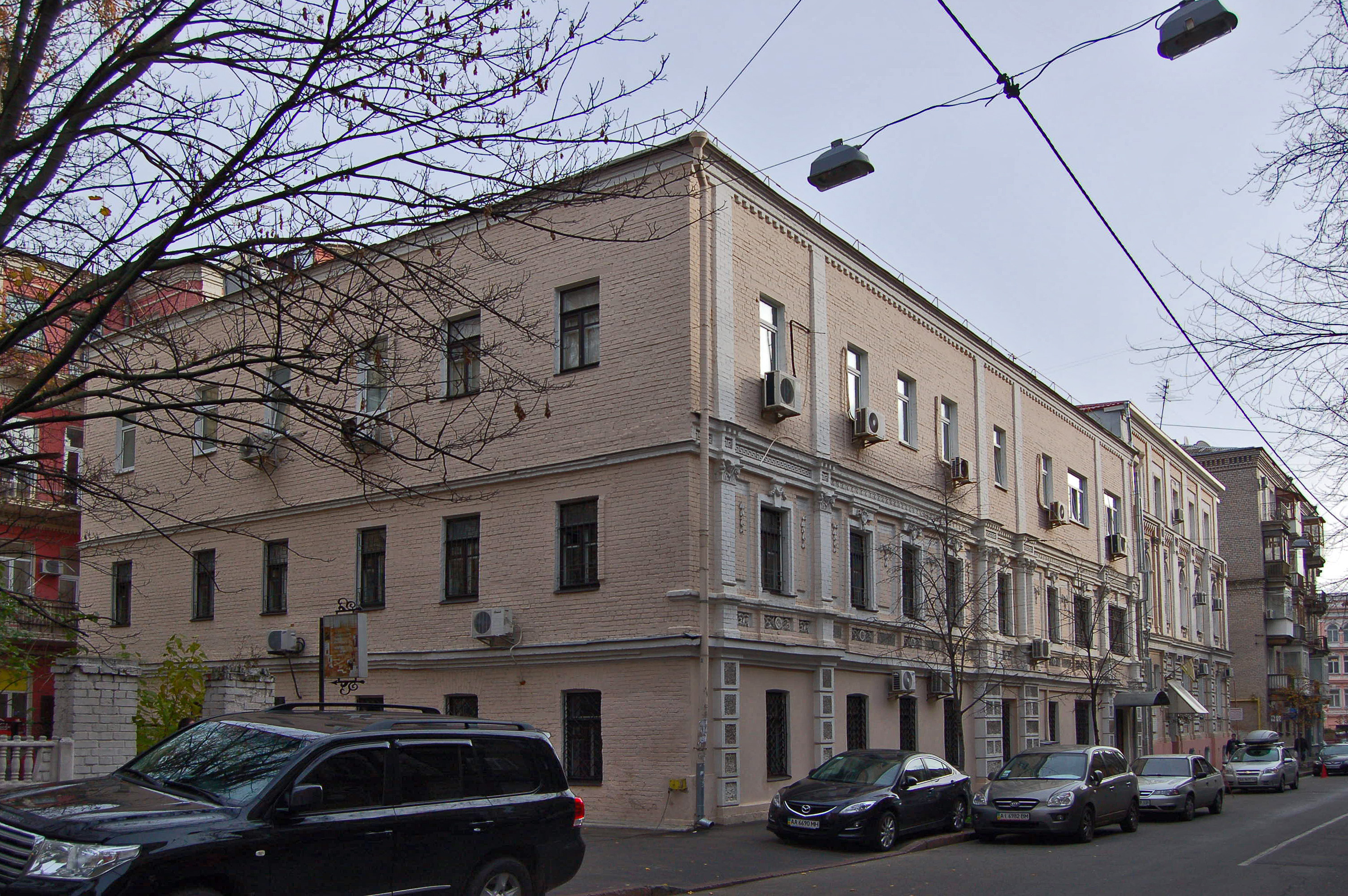
- Type: News website
- Industry: News agency
- Founded: 1992; 34 years ago
- Headquarters: Kyiv, Ukraine
- Key people: Iehor Boltryk, Director
- Owner: Andriy Oleksandrovych Martynenko
- Website: interfax.com.ua (Ukrainian) ru.interfax.com.ua (Russian) en.interfax.com.ua (English)

Interfax-Ukraine (Ukrainian: Інтерфакс-Україна) is a Ukrainian news agency. Founded in 1992, the company publishes in Ukrainian, Russian, English and German. The company presents itself as an independent Ukrainian news agency that serves the country's political and economic news market. It offers over forty news products in four languages. Interfax-Ukraine dispatches have been used by Reuters and Bloomberg in their news coverage from Ukraine.

== History ==
Original logo Interfax-Ukraine

Interfax was formed on 24 November 1992, the year following Ukraine's 1991 independence, by a team of 10 people in Kharkiv. In 1993 the agency moved to Kyiv. Director was Oleksandr Martynenko from its founding in 1992 to 1998 and from 2003 until his death in 2024. He was succeeded by Yegor Boltrik.

The company owns a 50-seat press centre. The staff of the agency is 105 people (as of the end of February 2022).

== Questions of independence ==
Some sources, up to 2013, affiliated the agency with the non-state Russian group Interfax Information Services. For this reason, in some sources the Ukrainian agency is still labeled as part of that group, which operates through an offshore company in Cyprus.

However, the founder and employees of the company have repeatedly denied this information, explaining that the only things uniting the organizations of the same name are a shared foreign sales system and editorial independence.

== See also ==
- List of newspapers in Ukraine
