= Martinich =

Martinich is a surname. Bearers include:

- Aloysius Martinich (born 1946), US philosopher
- Art Martinich, former US soccer player who earned caps in 1973
- Ivania Martinich (born 1995), Chilean tennis player
- Marcos Martinich (born 1996), Argentine professional footballer

== See also ==
- Martinić, a likely related Croatian surname
- Martinovich
- Martinic (disambiguation)
