= McMartin =

McMartin is a surname. Notable people with the surname include:

- Alexander McMartin (1788–1853), Canadian politician
- Barbara McMartin (1931–2005), Adirondack author and environmentalist
- Duncan McMartin Jr. (1776–1837), New York politician
- Grant McMartin (born 1970), Scottish footballer
- Jeff McMartin (born 1967), American football and track and field coach
- John McMartin (disambiguation), various people
- Mal McMartin (born 1944), Australian rugby league footballer
- Peter McMartin (1805–?), Mayor of Jersey City
- William H. R. McMartin (1854–1945), Canadian-born American politician

== See also ==
- The McMartin preschool trial, high-profile trial on child sexual abuse
