= Martinić =

Martinić is a Croatian surname, a patronymic of Martin. Notable people with the name include:

- Ivor Martinić (born 1984), Croatian playwright and screenwriter
- Marko Martinić (born 1990), Croatian water polo player
- Mateo Martinic (born 1931), Chilean historian, politician, and lawyer

== See also ==
- Martinic (disambiguation)
- Martinich (surname), likely related
- Martinović, also a patronymic of Martin
