= Martinic =

Martinic may refer to:

- Martinic family, Bohemian nobility
- Martinić, Croatian surname

== See also ==
- Martinich, surname
- Martinice (disambiguation), places in the Czech Republic
- Martinican, a demonym of the island Martinique
