= Martynas =

- Gender: Male

Origin
- Origin: Martin
- Meaning: of Mars, warlike
- Region of origin: Lithuania

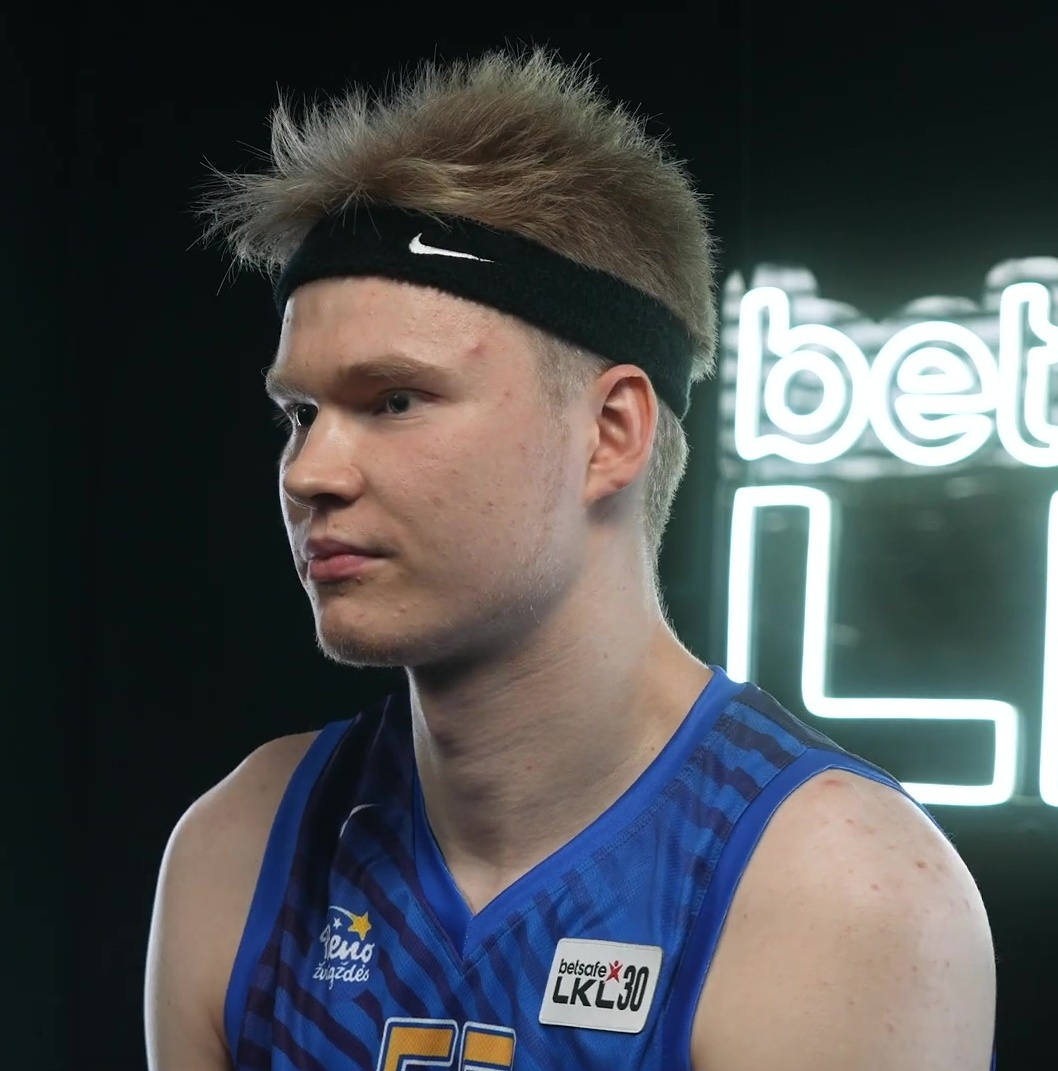
Martynas Arlauskas

Martynas is a Lithuanian masculine given name. It is a cognate of the English language name Martin.

== List of people named as ==
- Martynas Varnas (born 1997)

Lithuanian professional basketball player

- Martynas Andriukaitis (1981–2014), Lithuanian professional basketball player
- Martynas Andriuškevičius (born 1986), Lithuanian professional basketball player
- Martynas Gecevičius (born 1988), Lithuanian professional basketball player currently playing for BC Lietuvos Rytas
- Martynas Goštautas (1428–1483), nobleman from the Grand Duchy of Lithuania of Goštautai family
- Martynas Jankus (1858–1946), social activist and publisher in East Prussia
- Martynas Jurgilas (born 1988), track and field sprint athlete who competes internationally for Lithuania
- Martynas Knakfusas or Marcin Knackfus (1742–1821), Polish–Lithuanian Neoclassical architect of German descent
- Martynas Mažeika (born 1985), Lithuanian professional basketball player
- Martynas Mažvydas (1510–1563), author and the editor of the first printed book in the Lithuanian language
- Martynas Pocius (born 1986), Lithuanian professional basketball player
- Martynas Počobutas or Marcin Odlanicki Poczobutt (1728–1810), Polish–Lithuanian Jesuit astronomer and mathematician
- Martynas Švėgžda von Bekker (born 1967), Lithuanian violinist
- Simonas Martynas Kosakovskis or Szymon Marcin Kossakowski (1741–1794), Polish-Lithuanian nobleman

== See also ==
- Martynas Mažvydas National Library of Lithuania, the national library of Lithuania on Gediminas Avenue in Vilnius
- Martyn (disambiguation)
- Martynia
