= Roland Poirier Martinsson =

Swedish philosopher and television personality

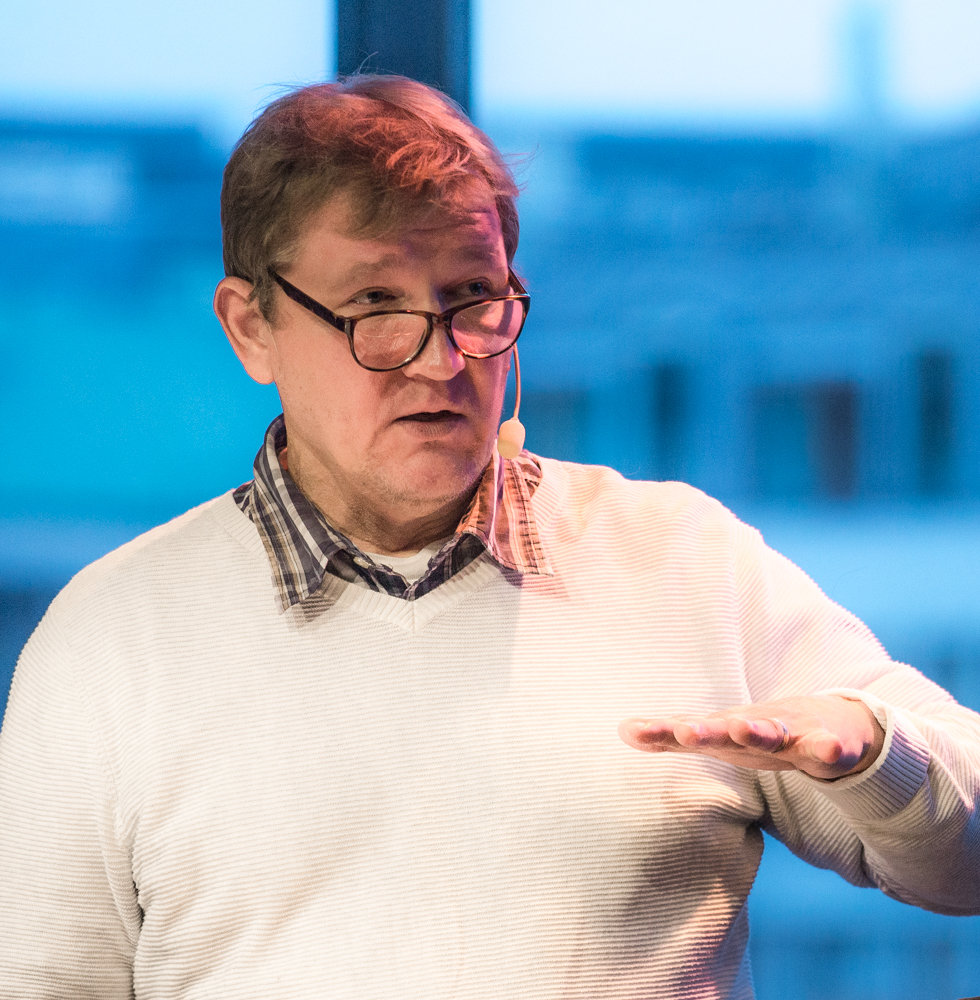
Roland Poirier Martinsson

Roland Poirier Martinsson (born in Åhus, Kristianstad County, Sweden, 15 February 1962) is an author, conservative philosopher and radio- and TV-personality from Sweden, who has lived in Austin, Texas. As a columnist, he writes mainly on American politics from a social and cultural point of view. He is a regular contributor to Svenska Dagbladet and Expressen, two major Swedish newspapers. He has also written for The Weekly Standard. Martinsson is married and has three children.

In 1997, he left the Church of Sweden and converted to Roman Catholicism.

Poirier Martinsson received his PhD in philosophy from Lund University, Sweden, in 2001 for a thesis on the justification of empirical beliefs (published in 2001 as A Two-Front Battle). His books are mainly concerned with the historic and contemporary relations between science, religion, culture and society.

== Works ==
- Kungen och baronerna. Magna Carta 800 år (Timbro, 2015) ISBN 978-91-87709-73-9
- Är Texas det nya Kalifornien? (Timbro, 2014, with Janerik Larsson) ISBN 9789187709005
- Zetterberg. Texter i urval. (ed. Timbro, 2011) ISBN 9789175667843
- A two-front battle: on the justification of empirical beliefs (Bjärnum, 2001, PhD thesis) ISBN 91-89336-07-0
- Russells kalkon: en bok om hur Gud och vetenskapen formade den västerländska kulturen (Norstedts, 2003) ISBN 91-1-301177-4
- Sånt är livet: om vetenskapens sökande efter livets början (Norstedts, 2005) ISBN 91-1-301323-8
- Arkimedes. Matematiker, vapenmakare, stjärnskådare (Norstedts, 2006) ISBN 91-1-301505-2
