= Mortensen =

Mortensen or Mortenson (in US) is a surname of Danish and Norwegian origin, meaning son of Morten. The Swedish variant is Mårtensson. Mortensen is currently the 20th most common surname in Denmark.

It may refer to the following people:

- Alex Mortensen (born 1985), American football coach
- Arne Mortensen (1900–1942), Norwegian rower
- Beverly Mortensen (born 1939), American musician and composer
- Carlos Mortensen (born 1972), Ecuadorian professional poker player
- Chris Mortensen (1951–2024), American journalist, father of Alex Mortensen
- Christian Mortensen (1882–1998), Danish-American supercentenarian
- Clayton Mortensen (born 1985), American baseball player
- Dale L. Mortensen (1966–2020), American politician
- Dale T. Mortensen (1939–2014), American economist
- Dan Mortensen (born 1968), American rodeo rider
- Daniel Mortensen (born 1994), Danish basketballer
- Erling Mortensen (born 1955), Danish chess master
- Finn Mortensen (1922–1983), Norwegian classical composer
- Flemming Møller Mortensen (born 1963), Danish politician
- Greg Mortenson, American humanitarian
- Hans Christian Cornelius Mortensen (1856–1921), Danish teacher and ornithologist
- Jens Jørn Mortensen (1927–2023), Danish weightlifter
- Jess Mortensen (1907–1962), American NCAA champion track athlete and coach
- Lars Ulrik Mortensen (born 1955), Danish harpsichordist and conductor
- Malene Mortensen (born 1982), Danish singer
- Norma Jean Mortenson, birth name of Marilyn Monroe (1926–1962), American actress
- Ole Mortensen (born 1958), Danish cricketer
- Ole Theodor Jensen Mortensen (1868–1952), Danish professor of zoology
- Patrick Mortensen (born 1989), Danish footballer
- Peder Mortensen (1934–2022), Danish archaeologist
- Stan Mortensen (1921–1991), English professional footballer
- Sara Mortensen (born 1979), French actress
- Sarah Mortensen (born 1997), Danish basketballer, sister of Daniel Mortensen
- Svend Aage Mortensen (1942–2015), Danish cardiologist
- Viggo Mortensen (born 1958), Danish-American actor, poet, musician, photographer and painter
- William Mortensen (1897–1965), American photographer, known for 1920s–1940s Hollywood portraits in the Pictorialist style
- Zachary Mortensen (born 1972), American film producer and writer
