= Martina Ćorković =

Croatian handball player (born 1993)

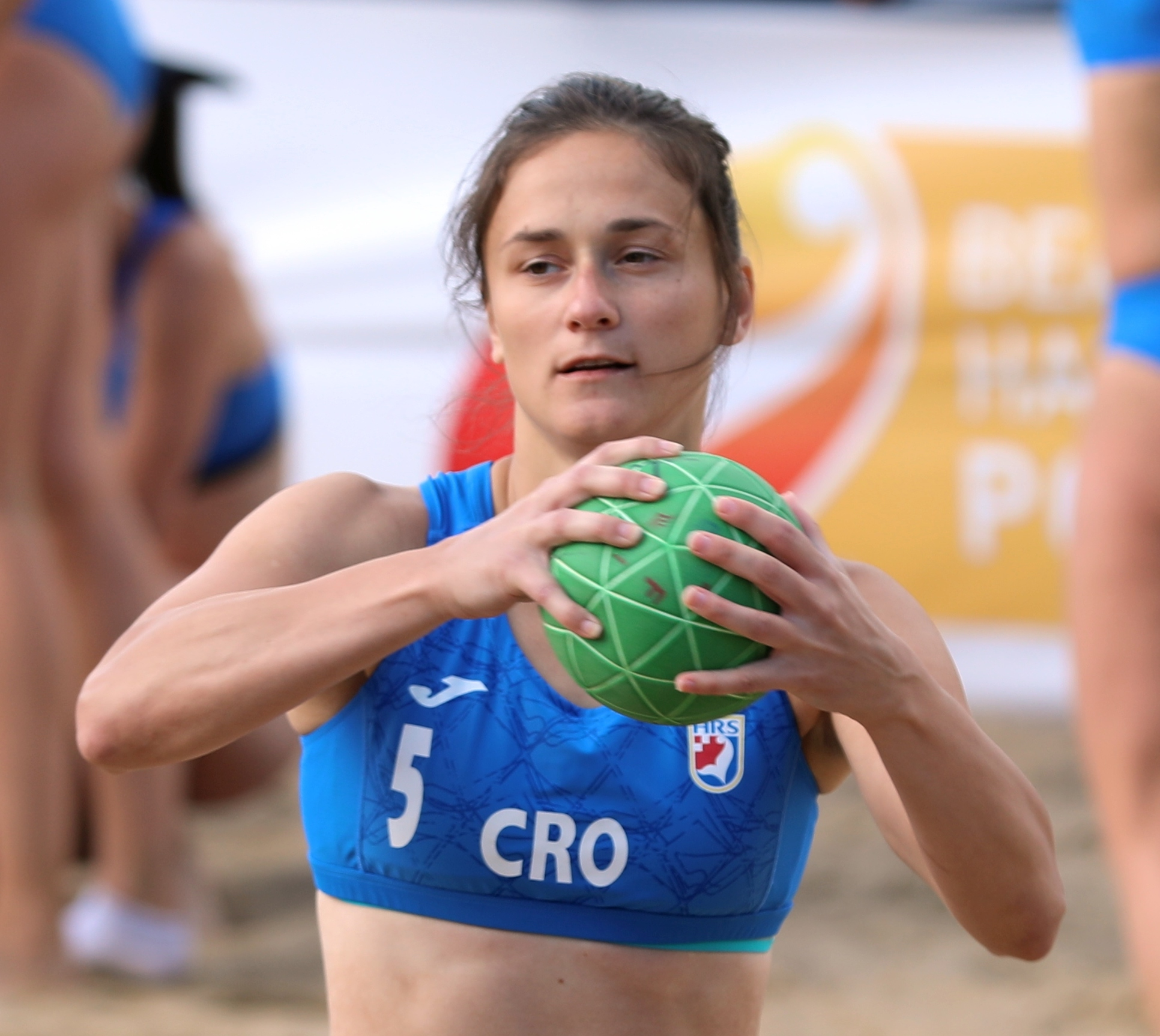

Personal information
- Nationality: Croatian
- Born: July 4, 1993 (age 33) Zagreb, Croatia
- Height: 1.68 m (5 ft 6 in)

Sport
- Sport: Handball
- Position: Middle back, left wing

Senior clubs
- Years: Team
- 2013–2014: ŽRK Samobor
- 2014–2015: Le Havre AC
- 2015–2016: Zağnos SK
- 2018–2019: CS Universitatea Cluj-Napoca
National team
- Years: Team
- –: Croatia

Martina Ćorković (born on 4 July 1993) is a Croatian handballer who plays for the Croatian national team.

== International honours ==
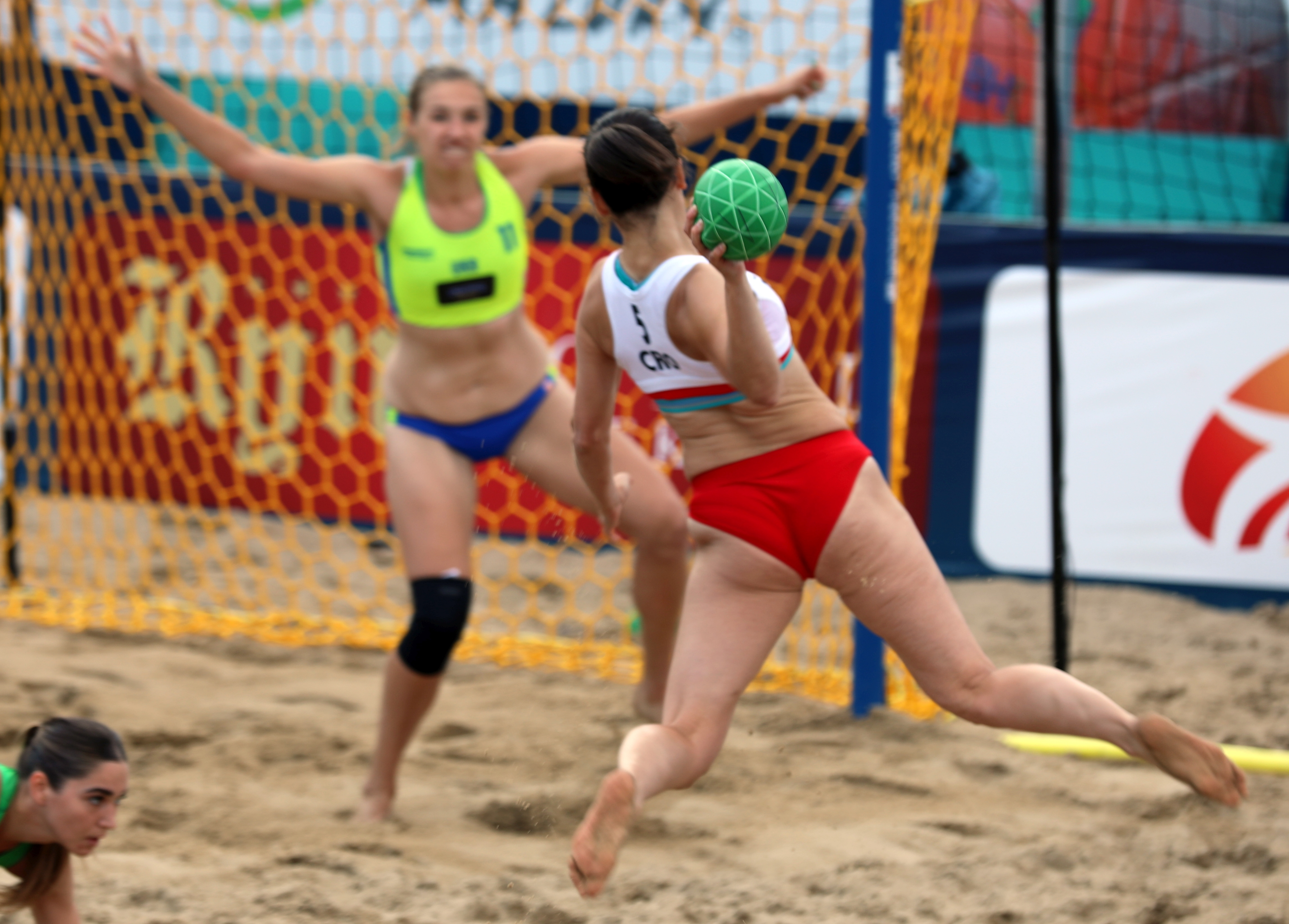
Ćorković shot at the goal at the 2019 European Beach Handball Championships

- EHF Challenge Cup:
  - Bronze Medalist: 2015

== Individual awards ==
- Croatian First League Top Scorer: 2014
