= Martiniano =

Martiniano is a given name. Notable people with the name include:

- José Martiniano Pereira de Alencar (1794–1860), Brazilian politician, journalist and priest
- Leonel Martiniano de Alencar, 1st Baron of Alencar (1832–1921), Brazilian noble, lawyer, politician and diplomat
- Martiniano Chilavert (1798–1852), Argentine military officer
- Martiniano Leguizamón (1858–1935), Argentine lawyer and writer
- Martiniano Moreno (born 2003), Argentine professional footballer
- Rafael Martiniano de Miranda Moura (born 1983), Brazilian footballer
- Martiniano Urriola (1823–1888), Chilean colonel in the War of the Pacific

== See also ==
- Martiniano Ferreira Botelho, town and municipality in the Vila Real district in northern Portugal
