= Marcin Nowak =

Marcin Nowak is the name of:

- Marcin Nowak (musician) (called "Novy"; born 1975), Polish death metal musician
- Marcin Nowak (volleyball) (born 1975), Polish volleyballer
- Marcin Nowak (sprinter) (born 1977), Polish sprinter
- Marcin Nowak (footballer) (born 1979), Polish footballer
- Marcin Nowak (director), Polish director and special effects artist
- Marcin Nowak (speedway rider) (born 1995), Polish speedway rider
