= Martinac =

Martinac may refer to:

== Places ==
- Martinac, Čazma, a village near Čazma, Bjelovar-Bilogora County, Croatia
- Martinac, Veliko Trojstvo, a village near Veliko Trojstvo, Bjelovar-Bilogora County, Croatia

== Other uses ==
- Martinac (priest), 15th-century Croatian Glagolite scribe

== People with the surname ==
- Martinac, surname
- Paula Martinac (born 1954), American writer
