= Martinov (Ostrava) =

Coordinates: 49°51′16.62″N 18°10′50.81″E

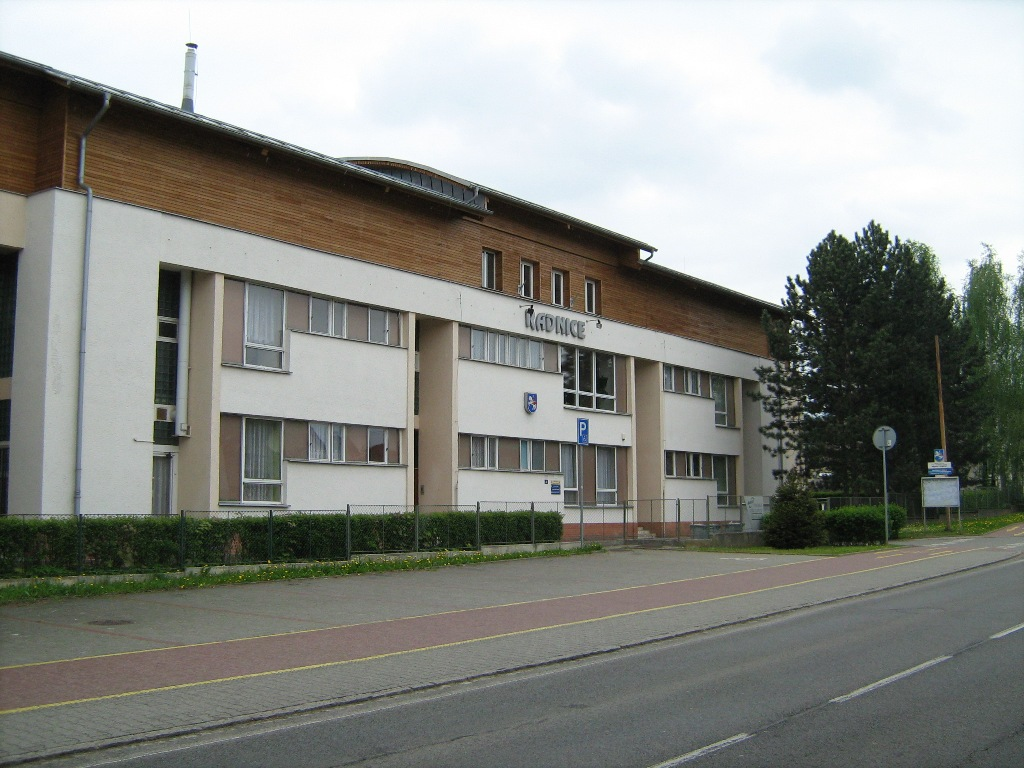
Town hall of Martinov

Martinov (German: Martinau) is a village, now administrative district of the city of Ostrava, Moravian-Silesian Region in the Czech Republic.

The village was first mentioned in a written document in 1424 as Myrtynow and lies in the historical region of Silesia. Martinov has an agricultural character and has a population of 1,131. The village was administratively joined to Ostrava in July 1961, after that the large food-processing plant was constructed there.

Coat of arms of the village depicts Saint Martin of Tours.
