= Marcin Kaczmarek =

Marcin Kaczmarek may refer to:

- Marcin Kaczmarek (swimmer) (born 1977), retired butterfly swimmer from Poland
- Marcin Kaczmarek (footballer, born 1979), Polish footballer
- Marcin Kaczmarek (footballer, born 1974), Polish former footballer and now manager
