= Marciniak =

Marciniak is a Polish surname, it may refer to:

- Adam Marciniak (born 1988), Polish footballer
- Aldona Marciniak (born 1984), Polish sports journalist and broadcaster
- Anna Marciniak (born 1979), Polish planetary scientist
- Artur Marciniak (born 1987), Polish footballer
- Florian Marciniak (1915–1944), Polish resistance fighter
- Isabelle Marciniak (2007–2025), Brazilian gymnast
- Michelle M. Marciniak (born 1973), American basketball player
- Ron Marciniak (1932–2020), American football player
- Szymon Marciniak (born 1981), Polish football referee
- Włodzimierz Marciniak (born 1954), Polish political scientist, diplomat

== See also ==
- Asteroid 10471 Marciniak, named after the planetary scientist
