= John McMartin (disambiguation) =

John McMartin (1929–2016) was an American stage, film and television actor.

John McMartin may also refer to:

- John McMartin (Canadian politician) (1858–1918), businessman, mining executive and legislator in Ontario
- John McMartin (rugby league) (1944–2018), Australian hooker from New South Wales during 1960s and 1970s
