= Antonio De Martino =

Italian physician, researcher and politician (1815–1904)

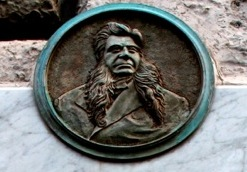
- Antonio De Martino's effigy on his house facade.
- Born: 25 February 1815; Palma Campania, Italy
- Died: 29 February 1904 (aged 89); Naples, Italy
- Education: University of Naples (Medicine and Surgery, 1836)
- Occupations: physician and senator

Antonio De Martino (25 February 1815 - 29 February 1904) was an Italian physician, researcher and politician.

== Biography ==
De Martino was born into a wealthy family in the town of Palma Campania, Italy. After studying in his home town, he enrolled at the Faculty of Medicine at the University of Naples, where he graduated at the age of 21. He first moved to Paris and then to Vienna to further his education. In the following years, he distinguished himself by his contribution to scientific literature, especially in the field of physiology, which made him well known among the other researchers in Naples.

De Martino showed a natural disposition to teach; upon returning to Naples, in 1841, he set up a private faculty of medicine and surgery under the name of "Ateneo".

From 1861 until his death, De Martino occupied the chair of General Pathology at the University of Naples. Also in 1861, and again in 1865, he was elected to the National Parliament. In 1869, as a medical adviser of the Royal House, he assisted in childbirth Princess Margherita, Umberto I's wife and future queen, who gave birth to Victor Emmanuel III.

De Martino was elected Senator of the Reign for scientific merit in 1881 and appointed to the Superior Council of Education. While holding this important political office, he managed to find time to publish 60 volumes on topics in education and research. He believed in the importance of scientific research and in the importance of teaching the history of medicine to young medical students. In the last years of his life he continued to practice medicine and founded the "Labour society for mutual aid."

In 1884 he was awarded a gold medal by the Public Health Department for his relief work among people infected with cholera.

Antonio De Martino died on 29 February 1904, at the age of 89. The funeral was solemnly celebrated by scientists, physicians and statesmen. Queen Margherita placed a garland on his grave, and sorrowfully telegraphed the physician's relatives, commending "his rare qualities, of heart and mind, which enriched his temperament". The following morning Giuseppe Saracco, president of the Senate, commemorated him in Camera Alta.

De Martino's remains were interred in the cemetery of Palma Campania, his native soil. A marble bust by sculptor Francesco Jerace commemorates him in the "Quadrato degli uomini illustri" in the cemetery of Naples.

In 2004, on the occasion of the centenary of De Martino's death, the town of Palma Campania, the region of Campania and the province of Naples, celebrated his life with a festival and with the unveiling of a marble plaque on the facade of the Palazzo De Martino.

== Bibliography ==
- Pasquale Nappi, Un paese nella gloria del sole: Palma Campania - seconda edizione, Grafica Normatipo, Brusciano (Napoli), 1982, pp. 172–179
- Pietro Manzi, L'arte di Esculapio in Nola e nei paesi dell'Agro, Tipografia Scala, Nola (Napoli), 1963, p. 68.
