= Víctor Amador De Martino =

Argentine politician (1943–2024)

Member of the Argentine Chamber of Deputies
- In office 2 December 1989 – 11 December 1993

Personal details
- Born: 24 February 1943 Buenos Aires, Argentina
- Died: 7 December 2024 (aged 81)
- Party: UCR
- Education: Faculty of Law, University of Buenos Aires; Universidad del Salvador

Víctor Amador De Martino (24 February 1943 – 7 December 2024) was an Argentine politician. A member of the Radical Civic Union, he served in the Chamber of Deputies from 1989 to 1993.

De Martino died on 7 December 2024, at the age of 81.
