= Záryby =

- Municipality
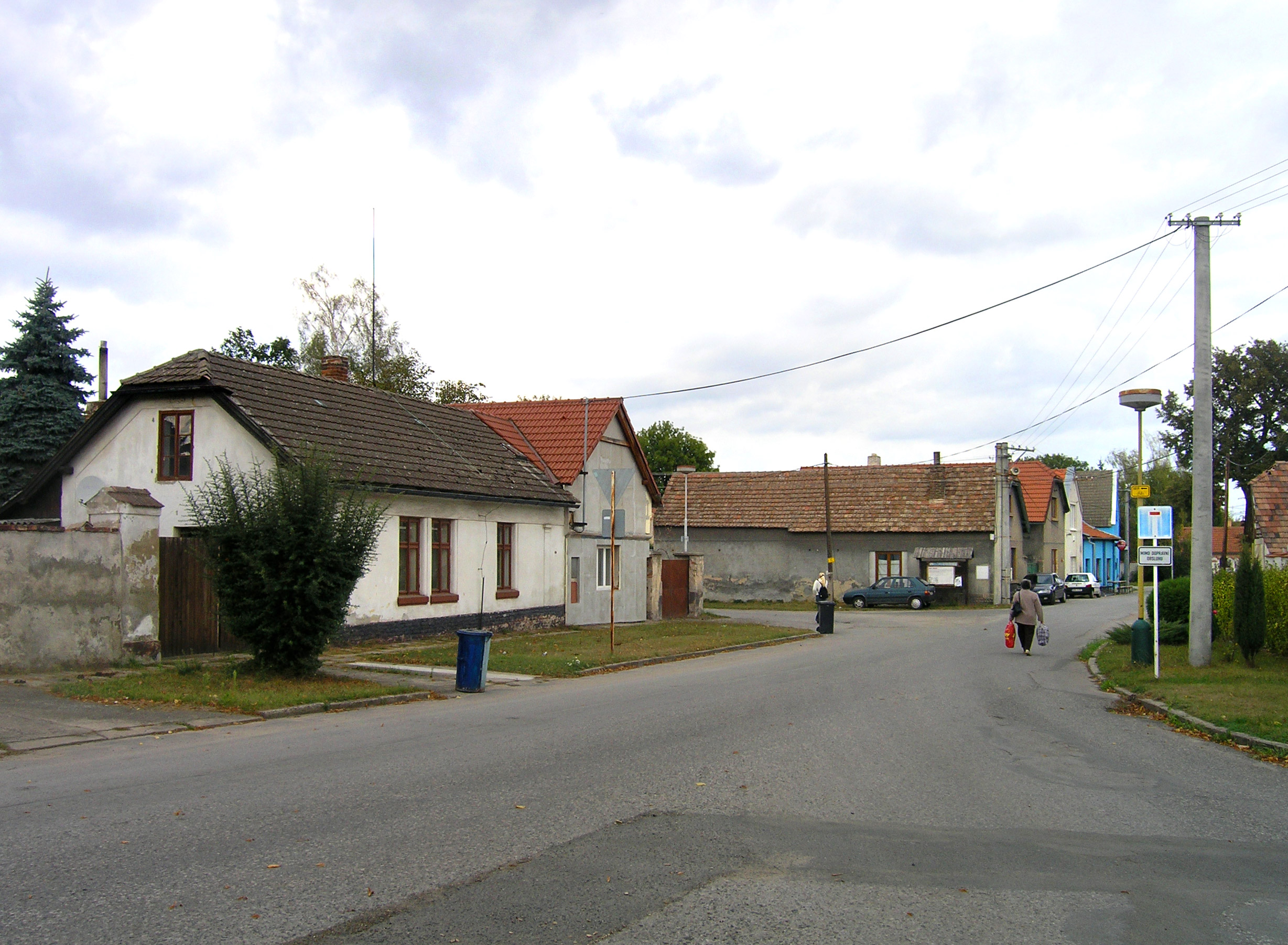
- Centre of Záryby

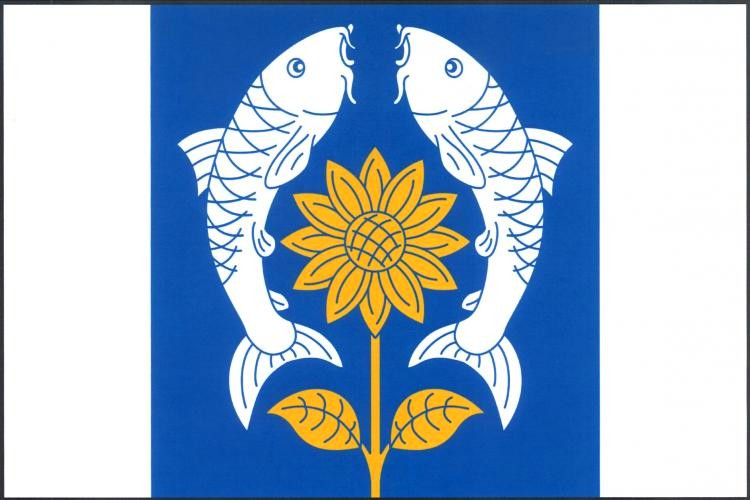
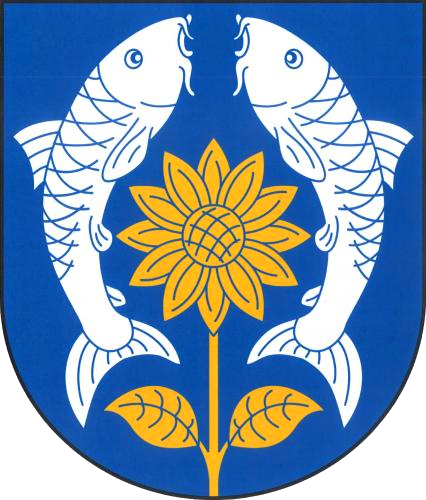
- Flag Coat of arms

- Location in the Czech Republic
- Coordinates: 50°13′14″N 14°37′33″E
- Country: Czech Republic
- Region: Central Bohemian
- District: Prague-East
- First mentioned: 1371

Area
  - Total: 8.15 km^{2} (3.15 sq mi)
- Elevation: 170 m (560 ft)

Population (2026-01-01)
  - Total: 1,143
  - Density: 140/km^{2} (363/sq mi)
- Time zone: UTC+1 (CET)
  - Summer (DST): UTC+2 (CEST)
- Postal code: 277 13
- Website: www.zaryby.cz

Záryby is a municipality and village in Prague-East District in the Central Bohemian Region of the Czech Republic. It has about 1,100 inhabitants.

== Administrative division ==
Záryby consists of two municipal parts (in brackets population according to the 2021 census):

- Záryby (808)
- Martinov (279)

== Demographics ==
Historical population
Year	Pop.	±%
1869	412	—
1880	446	+8.3%
1890	461	+3.4%
1900	603	+30.8%
1910	734	+21.7%
1921	762	+3.8%
1930	796	+4.5%
1950	691	−13.2%
1961	730	+5.6%
1970	710	−2.7%
1980	698	−1.7%
1991	641	−8.2%
2001	653	+1.9%
2011	888	+36.0%
2021	1,087	+22.4%
Source: Censuses
