= Marcin (Auxiliary Bishop of Kraków) =

Auxiliary bishop of Krakow (d. 1321)

Marcin OFM
- Auxiliary bishop of Kraków; Auxiliary bishop of Olomouc

Personal details
- Died: 1321 Brno, Margraviate of Moravia
- Denomination: Catholic Church

Marcin (died 1321) was the first auxiliary bishop of Kraków and a Auxiliary Bishop in Olomouc.

== Biography ==
Marcin is considered the first auxiliary bishop of the Diocese of Kraków. He came from the Franciscan order. Marcin was appointed bishop of Belgrade (Latin: Nanduralbensis) by Pope Nicholas IV around 1290. However, due to the prevailing schism at the time, he was unable to assume the episcopate (also his successors, until 1380, did not actually exercise their functions). Probably due to his links with the Franciscan order, Marcin moved (perhaps returned) further north in Europe.

In 1303 documents record his activity in the Diocese of Kraków. In January 1303, together with the Bishop of Kraków Jan Muskata, he took part in a dispute in Stary Sącz over the right of patronage over the church in Łącko. His stay in the Diocese of Kraków was probably quite short, for as early as 1306 he travelled with Bishop Antal from Csanad to Padua. He later served as Auxiliary Bishop in Olomouc. He died in a Franciscan monastery at Brno in Moravia in 1321.

== See also ==
- Archbishop of Kraków
- Roman Catholic Archdiocese of Kraków
