= Leokadia Serafinowicz =

Children's theater director (b. 1915, d. 2007)

- Born: 23 February 1915; Jonava, Lithuania
- Died: 24 November 2007 (aged 92); Puszczykowo, Poland

Leokadia Serafinowicz was an artist and promoter of Polish puppet theater and Theater for Young Audiences (TYA). She was a puppeteer, director, scenographer, and a writer of scenarios as well as theater and film adaptations. She served as director and art director at the Teatr Lalki i Aktora (Actor and Puppet Theater) "Marcinek" in Poznań from 1960 to 1976, making it one of the most prestigious puppet theaters of its time. She was a co-founder and the first president of ASSITEJ Poland (1981–1982), and an honorary member of UNIMA (from 2000).

She initiated a number of events featuring Polish puppet theater and TYA, including the Biennial of Art for Children which has been taking place in Poznań since 1973.

She received a number of awards both for her artistic work and for her organizational and promotional efforts, including the Gold Medal of the 20th Prague Quadrennial of Performance Design and Space (1971), the Order of the Smile (1978) and the Order of Polonia Restituta, or the Officer's Cross (1985).

She died on 24 November 2007 in Puszczykowo, Poland.

== Youth and education ==
Serafinowicz was born in Jonava, Lithuania on 23 February 1915 in a Polish family and raised as a Polish patriot. She studied painting at the Fine Arts Faculty of the Stefan Batory University in Vilnius (1937–1939). After World War II, she was repatriated to Poland. She continued her studies at the Nicolaus Copernicus University in Toruń (1945–1948), and earned her diploma in painting (1951). In 1954 she passed her extramural acting examination in puppetry. In 1961, she qualified as a puppet theater director.

== Career ==
=== Cracow, Wrocław, Bielsko-Biała ===
From 1948 to 1956 she worked in the Puppet Theater "Groteska" in Cracow as an actor and an assistant of Władysław Jarema, one of the greatest puppet artists of the post-war period in Poland. It was there that she made her first steps as an independent director. She held the position of art director at the Puppet Stage of Teatr Rozmaitości (Variety Theater) in Wrocław from 1956 to 1958, where she developed her directing skills and made her debut as a scenographer. She worked as a director and scenographer at the puppet theater "Banialuka" in Bielsko-Biała from 1958 to 1960. Here she directed many plays, including two plays she authored under the pen name Dominika: “O słońcu, sroczce i krasnoludkach” (1958) and “Profesor Serduszko” (1960).

=== Actor and Puppet theater “Marcinek” in Poznań ===
From 1960 to 1976 she held the position of Director at the Actor and Puppet Theater “Marcinek” in Poznań, which quickly became one of the most important puppet theaters in Poland and most well-known ones abroad. In addition she held the position of Art Director from 1960 to 1980.

She wrote in a program for one of the plays she directed:

Theatre for children should present the language of art to the young members of its audience. It ought to teach them about artistic conventions, develop their aesthetic sensitivity and enrich their imagination ...

— Leokadia Serafinowicz, O słonku, sroce i krasnoludkach – theatre play program, 1960

As director and art director, she realized these aspirations by creating an ambitious theater program for young audiences and adolescents, which dealt with current, significant social issues and used contemporary means of artistic expression. Treating this program as a "theater for the man of the future", she arranged the repertoire to reflect the complexity of life and the world, and teach critical thinking. The Marcinek aimed to educate future contemporary art audiences. Thus, Serafinowicz's efforts not only led to the creation of an ambitious repertoire for children, but also contributed to the establishment of puppet theater as an art form addressed to both adolescents and adults. As a result of her efforts the Marcinek was one of the first Polish theaters which regularly put on plays for older audiences.

Under Serafinowicz's management, the Marcinek developed an original artistic style, and the Poznań puppet scene became known for the high artistic, musical and literary quality of its performances. Leokadia Serafinowicz's collaborators in this effort included Wojciech Wieczorkiewicz (director), Jan Berdyszak (scenographer), Józef Ratajczak (poet) and Krystyna Miłobędzka (poet, playwright). In addition, the Marcinek was associated with composers such as: Krzysztof Penderecki, Marek Stachowski, Jerzy Milian and Jerzy Kurczewski.

Serafinowicz also invited foreign artists to cooperate with the Marcinek, including: Jetta Donega (Italy), Julia Ognianowa (Bulgaria), Josef Krofta (Czech Republic), Karel Brožek (Czech Republic), František Vitek (Czech Republic) and Vera Řičařova (Czech Republic).

The plays put on at the Marcinek were translated into English, French, Spanish, German, Italian, Czech and Esperanto. They were often presented at international festivals in England, Belgium, Bulgaria, Croatia, Czechoslovakia, Denmark, France, Japan, Canada, Cuba, Mexico, GDR, FRG, Switzerland, US, Hungary, Italy and the USSR.

==== Plays produced by the Marcinek and presented abroad included ====
- 1967: Kasia Who Had Lost Her Geese (O Kasi, co gąski zgubiła), libretto: Kownacka M., music: Kurczewski L., director: Wieczorkiewicz W., scenography: Serafinowicz L.
- 1968: The Bravest (Najdzielniejszy), libretto: Szelburg-Zarembina E., music: Penderecki K. and Stachowski M., director: Wieczorkiewicz W., scenography: Berdyszak J.
- 1969: Mary, Mary, Quite Contrary (Siała baba mak) by Krystyna Miłobędzka, director: Serafinowicz L., scenography: Berdyszak J.
- 1970: Homeland (Ojczyzna) by Krystyna Miłobędzka, director: Wieczorkiewicz W., scenography: Berdyszak J.
- 1970: Hephastus (Hefajstos) by Anna Świrszczyńska, director: Wieczorkiewicz W., scenography: Serafinowicz L.
- 1972: Lajkonik (Lajkonik), libretto: Kownacka M., music: Kurczewski J., director: Wieczorkiewicz W., scenography: Serafinowicz L.
- 1974: Little Tiger (Tygrysek) by Hanna Januszewska, director: Wieczorkiewicz W., scenography: Serafinowicz L.
- 1975: Janosik (Janosik) by Karel Brožek, Jan V. Dvorak & Krystyna Miłobędzka, director: Krofta J., Wieczorkiewicz W., Brožek K., Mokos J., scenography: Vitek F., Serafinowicz L., Řičařova V., Hejcman K.
- 1976: Don Quixote (Don Kichot) by Miguel de Cervantes Savedra, director: Krofta J., scenography: Vitek F., Řičařova V
- 1977: Ptam (Ptam) by Krystyna Miłobędzka, Serafinowicz L., scenography: Berdyszak J.

==== Other important plays put on at “Marcinek” ====
- 1961: A Dance with Professor Bączyński (Bal u profesora Bączyńskiego) by Konstanty Ildefons Gałczyński; direction and scenography: Serafinowicz L.
- 1961: Reynard the Fox (Pieśń o lisie) by Johann Wolfgang Goethe; director: Wieczorkiewicz W., scenography: Serafinowicz L.
- 1965: Nightingale (Słowik) by Józef Ratajczak; director: Wieczorkiewicz W., scenography: Serafinowicz L.
- 1969: Wedding (Wesele) by Stanisław Wyspiański; director: Serafinowicz L., scenography: Berdyszak J.
- 1970: Wanda (Wanda) by Cyprian Kamil Norwid; director: Wieczorkiewicz W., scenography: Serafinowicz L.

== Cooperation with other theaters ==
Serafinowicz worked in many theaters in Poland and abroad. She directed plays in Romania (Tigrisorul, 1970) and Czechoslovakia (Aj tak sejou mak…, 1973). She also designed the artistic setting for performances in Bulgaria (Misterium-buffo, 1968), Romania (Tigrisorul, 1970), Czechoslovakia (Janosik, 1975), FRG (Reineke Fuchs, 1980; Jim Kopf und der Lokomotiveführer, 1987; König Jemand, 1988; Jim Kopf und die Wilde 13, 1988) and Russia (Szewczyk Dratewka, 1996).

== Exhibitions ==
Serafinowicz participated in group stage design exhibitions in Warsaw (1956, 1962), Venice (1964), Liège (1970), Prague (1971), Paris (1972, 1975), Zurich (1972) and Budapest (1996). She had many individual exhibitions organized in Poland and abroad, including in Bristol (1986) and Prague (1988).

== Bibliography ==
- Karasińska, ed. (1985) Poznański Teatr Lalki i Aktora 1945–1985 (in Polish) Poznań.
- Sych Honorata (1996) Leokadia Serafinowicz (in Polish), Łódź, ISBN 83-86127-65-1.
- Jurkowski Henryk (2006), Moje pokolenie (in Polish), Łódź, ISBN 83-86127-32-5, s. 180–194.
- Waszkiel Marek (2012), Dzieje teatru lalek w Polsce 1944–2000, (in Polish), Warszawa, ISBN 978-83-927763-4-5.
