= Martino (given name) =

- Gender: Male
- Name day: November 11

Origin
- Origin: Latin
- Meaning: Of Mars, warlike, warrior
- Region of origin: Roman Empire

Other names
- Related names: Martin, Martina

Martino is a male given name, the Italian form of Martin.

== People with the given name Martino ==
- Martino Altomonte, Italian Baroque painter of Austrian descent who mainly worked in Poland and Austria
- Martino Cignaroli, Italian Baroque painter also called il Veronese
- Martino Finotto, Italian racing driver, mainly known for his success in touring car and sports car racing
- Martino Gamper, an internationally regarded Italian designer based in London
- Martino Martini, Italian Jesuit missionary, cartographer and historian, mainly working on ancient Imperial China
- Martino Minuto (born 1988) Italian-Turkish fencrr
- Martino Olivetti, Italian footballer who played in A.C. Milan, now retired
- Martino Rota, Italian engraver and painter from Dalmatia
- Martino Zaccaria, Italian politician and admiral, Lord of Chios from 1314 to 1329, ruler of several other Aegean islands, and baron of Veligosti–Damala and Chalandritsa in the Principality of Achaea

== See also ==
- Martin (name)
- Martina (given name)
- Martino (surname)
