= Jakub Martinec =

Jakub Martinec may refer to:

- Jakub Martinec (footballer) (born 1998), Czech footballer
- Jakub Martinec (musical artist) (born 1979), Czech professor of choral activities
