= Nick DeMartino =

American businessman

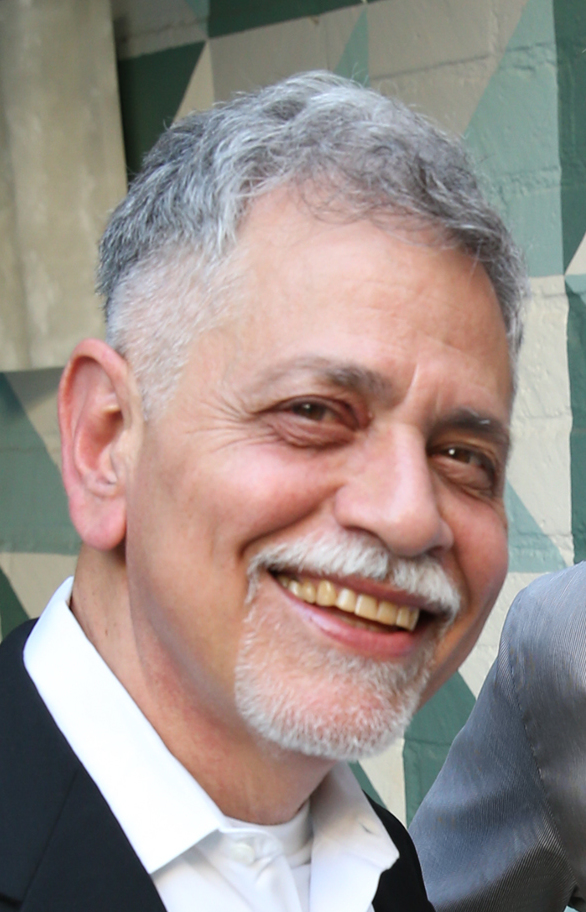
- Born: June 15, 1948 (age 78)

Nick DeMartino (born June 15, 1948) is an American writer, businessman and the former Senior Vice President of Media and Technology for the American Film Institute (AFI). With AFI, DeMartino oversaw digital ventures.

== Early career ==
DeMartino holds a Bachelor of Arts degree from the University of Louisville and a Master of Arts in media studies from Antioch College. As a television producer, DeMartino has produced TV documentaries about nuclear power, abortion, and comedy, among other topics.

For the Labor Institute of Public Affairs, a media production and distribution unit for organized labor, DeMartino developed and managed a $20 million advertising and communications program, teleconferences, training programs and a cable television service. DeMartino subsequently founded the Washington Community Video Center and TeleVISIONS Magazine. As principal staff writer for the Carnegie Commission on the Future of Public Broadcasting, he wrote their report and follow-up study titled Keeping PACE with the New Television. DeMartino recommended the creation of a Fund for Independent Television, the prototype for ITVS.

== AFI ==
Under DeMartino's leadership, AFI led a number of initiatives that influenced how digital media might best be employed within the worlds of entertainment and education.

In 1990, DeMartino joined AFI to direct the Cinetex trade show, conference, and film festival. He also became a member of the AFI's Advanced Technology Program.

== Awards and honors ==
- 1995, Los Angeles Business Journal named DeMartino a leader in the technology industry.
- 1999, DeMartino named one of twenty leaders in broadband technology by the Los Angeles Business Journal.
- 2006, ranked number 3 in the "Digital 50" compiled by The Hollywood Reporter and the Producers Guild of America's New Media Council.
- Recipient of the INDIE award from ITVS for service to independent producers.
