= Tonino Martino =

Italian footballer

Personal information
- Date of birth: 13 June 1969 (age 57)
- Place of birth: Turrivalignani, Italy
- Height: 1.75 m (5 ft 9 in)
- Position: Midfielder

Team information
- Current team: Reggina (youth)

Senior career*
Years	Team	Apps	(Gls)
1987–1989	Penne	59	(17)
1989–1990	Celano	25	(1)
1990–1991	Penne	28	(9)
1991–1992	Lanciano	36	(5)
1992–1998	Castel di Sangro	173	(9)
1998	Empoli	10	(0)
1998–2000	Reggina	40	(3)
2000	Savoia	13	(3)
2000–2002	Livorno	50	(2)
2002–2003	Lanciano	21	(0)
2003–2005	Brindisi	29	(13)
2005–2009	Castel di Sangro	?	(27)
2009–2010	Sporting Scalo	?	(3)
2010–2011	Casoli	?	(1)
2011–2012	Popoli	?	(?)
Total		484+	(93)

Managerial career
- 2010–2011: Casoli
- 2013–2014: Decontra Scafa
- 2014–2015: Popoli
- 2018–: Reggina (youth)
- * Club domestic league appearances and goals

Tonino Martino (born 13 June 1969), is an Italian former professional footballer who played as a midfielder.

== Career ==
Martino began his career playing for Penne, and after brief spells at Celano and Lanciano, he arrived at Castel di Sangro, where he made 173 appearances. In the 1998–99 season, playing for Reggina in Serie B, he scored a decisive goal for the team's first promotion to Serie A, against Torino on 13 June. He was also part of the Serie C1 win squad with Livorno, and at the end of his career, with Castel di Sangro, he was part of the Promozione title. Martino also worked as a coach for Casoli in the Promozione, and for Popoli in the Seconda Categoria. Currently, he works in the youth sectors at AS Reggina.

== Honours ==
Livorno

- Serie C1: 2001–02 (group A)

Castel di Sangro

- Promozione: 2006–07 (Abruzzo)
