= Martin Evans (disambiguation) =

Sir Martin Evans (born 1941) is a British biologist and Nobel prize winner.

Martin or Martyn Evans may also refer to:

- Martin Evans (cricketer) (1904–1998), English cricketer and naval officer
- Martin Evans (model engineer) (1916–2003)
- Martyn Evans (born 1953), Australian politician
- Martyn Evans (philosopher) (H. Martyn Evans), professor of philosophy of music at the University of Durham
- Martyn Evans, English heavy metal guitarist in Trigger the Bloodshed

== See also ==
- Marty Evans (Marsha J. Evans, born 1947), retired U.S. Navy admiral
- Sir Martyn Evans-Bevan, 2nd Baronet, of the Evans-Bevan baronets
