= Martinescu =

Martinescu is a Romanian surname which may refer to:

- Pericle Martinescu (1911–2005), writer and journalist
- Nicolae Martinescu (1940–2013), heavyweight Olympic gold medalist in Greco-Roman wrestling (1972)
