= Martinovich =

Martinovich is a surname. It can be an anglicization of Martinović. Notable people with the surname include:

- Glafira Martinovich (born 1989), Belarusian gymnast
- Kelsey Martinovich (born 1990), Australian model
- Phil Martinovich (1915–1964), American football player

== See also ==
- Marinovich
- Martinich
