= Ewa Marcinek =

Polish-Icelandic writer

- Education: University of Wrocław (BA creative writing; MA cultural studies)
- Occupation: Writer
- Writing career
- Period: 2020-present
- Website: ewamarcinek.com

Ewa Marcinek is a Polish-Icelandic writer. In 2019, she co-founded the Reykjavíik Ensemble International Theatre Company, Iceland's first international theatre. Her debut work, Ísland pólerað ("Polishing Iceland"), about a woman immigrating from Poland to Iceland, was staged as a play in Iceland in 2020 and also later in Poland, and published as a collection of stories and poems in 2022.

Ewa Marcinek was born in Poland and grew up in the country's Lower Silesia region. She earned a Bachelor of Arts in creative writing and a Master of Arts in cultural studies from the University of Wrocław. In the summer of 2013, Marcinek visited Iceland, living there for three months while working on a cultural project with the Icelandic art house cinema Bíó Paradís. Shortly after returning to Poland, she survived an assault by a man who had attacked several women in the area before being arrested. Marcinek decided to move to Iceland permanently because it felt "very safe for women". She settled in Reykjavik in 2014, working as a waitress in restaurants and cafés.

In 2014 and 2015, Marcinek joined writing workshops for international women, led by Canadian poet Angela Rawlings, first in the ethnically- and linguistically diverse Reykjavík neighborhood of Breiðholt, and then in Reykjavík City Library. The group of women founded later a publishing company, Ós Pressan (Icelandic for "river mouth"), and a literary journal, Ós - The Journal. In 2015, Marcinek began reading her work at literary events, and in 2018, she consulted for the National Theatre of Iceland. Her work in theater led her to found Iceland's first international theatre company, the Reykjavik Ensemble International Theatre Company, with director Pálína Jónsdóttir in 2019. Ísland pólerað was adapted into a play and performed at Tjarnarbíó theater in Reykjavik in March 2020. The play was also performed in Poland.

In 2022, Ísland pólerað was published by Forlagið, Iceland's largest publishing house, as a collection of poems and short stories. The book was edited by Sigþrúður Gunnarsdóttir and translated into Icelandic by Helga Soffía Einarsdóttir. It is one of the first books written by a Polish-Icelandic author, despite Poles being the largest minority group in Iceland. The work relates the story of a Polish woman who divorces her husband, survives a violent crime, and immigrates to Iceland, where she encounters xenophobia. The title, Ísland pólerað, means "Polishing Iceland", and is a play on the words Polish and to polish, a reference to the manual labor often performed by immigrants.

The same year, Marcinek received a Listamannalaun fellowship from Iceland's Ministry of Education, Science and Culture.
