= Sophia Martineck =

German illustrator, designer and comics artist

Sophia Martineck (born 1981, Naumburg, East Germany) is a German illustrator, designer and comics artist.

== Life ==
Martineck studied visual communication and illustration in Berlin, New York City and Liverpool and graduated in 2007. Since then she has worked as a freelance illustrator and comics artist and has received the Hans-Meid-Förderpreis and the Art Directors Club Young Guns Award for her work. Martineck's work has been noted for its "subtle, blocky and gorgeously detailed illustrations" and has been featured in numerous international publications including The New Yorker, The Financial Times and Le Monde. Martineck has received particular attention in the United States for her depictions of city life in New York, which Priscilla Frank has noted, "perfectly capture that overwhelmed posture of a little kid in a big city." In an interview with German television station ZDF, Martineck stressed her preference for the isometric (or 45 degree angle) point of view, which gives her drawings the feeling that the viewer is in the air overlooking an entire city. Her debut work Hühner, Porno, Schlägerei [Chickens, Porno, Brawl], published 2012 by Avant Verlag, examines the changing working conditions and lifestyles of rural agricultural communities and is based on true stories, although the names and locations are fictionalized.

Sophia Martineck's illustrations often feature a combination of traditional and digital techniques, creating visually engaging and imaginative pieces. Her work is characterized by a strong sense of storytelling, attention to detail, and the use of vibrant colors.

== Selected works ==
- Hühner, Porno, Schlägerei. 2012. ISBN 3939080624.
- Die Fliege. 2013. ISBN 3864060281.
- Classics Reimagined: The Adventures of Sherlock Holmes. 2014. ISBN 1592539882.
