= Martinec =

Martinec (feminine: Martincová) is a Czech surname. Notable people include:

- Boris Martinec (born 1988), Croatian figure skater
- Emil Martinec (born 1958), American physicist
- Eva Martincová (born 1975), Czech tennis player
- Hynek Martinec (born 1980), Czech painter
- Jakub Martinec, multiple people
- Patrik Martinec (born 1971), Czech ice hockey player
- Přemysl Martinec, Czech surrealist
- Tereza Martincová (born 1994), Czech tennis player
- Tomas Martinec (born 1976), Czech-German ice hockey player
- Vladimír Martinec (born 1949), Czech ice hockey player

== Fictional characters ==
- Chaplain Martinec from The Good Soldier Švejk
