= Marcinkiewicz =

Marcinkiewicz is a Polish family name of patronymic origin, meaning "son of Marcin (Martin)". People named Marcinkiewicz include:

- Iwona Marcinkiewicz (born 1975), Polish archer
- Józef Marcinkiewicz (1910–1940), Polish mathematician, author of the Marcinkiewicz theorem
- Kazimierz Marcinkiewicz (born 1959), former prime minister of Poland
- Matvey Martinkevich (born 2002), Russian and Serbian footballer
- Maxim Martsinkevich (1984–2020), Russian neo-Nazi activist
- Mike Marcinkiewicz (born 1966), Canadian professional ice hockey player
- Vintsent Dunin-Martsinkyevich, or Wincenty Dunin-Marcinkiewicz (1808–1884), Belarusian–Polish writer and social activist
