= Marteinsson =

Marteinsson is an Icelandic patronymic surname, literally meaning "son of Martein". Notable people with the name include:

- Andri Marteinsson (born 1965), Icelandic footballer
- Pétur Marteinsson (born 1973), Icelandic footballer
