= Mårtensson =

Mårtensson, Martensson, Mårtenson and Martenson are surnames. Notable people with the names include:

- Agneta Mårtensson (born 1961), Swedish freestyle swimmer
- Anders Mårtensson (1893–1973), Swedish vaulter who competed in the 1920 Summer Olympics
- Beata Mårtensson-Brummer (1880–1956), Swedish artist
- Benny Mårtensson (born 1957), Swedish association football player
- Bertil Mårtensson (1945–2018), Swedish author of science fiction, crime fiction and fantasy; also an academic philosopher
- Bodil Mårtensson (born 1952), Swedish author of crime novels and adventure books
- Christer Mårtensson (born 1954), Swedish curler, World and European champion
- Frithiof Mårtensson (1884–1956), Swedish wrestler who competed in the 1908 Summer Olympics
- Göran Mårtensson (born 1960), Swedish Army lieutenant general
- Jan Mårtenson (1933–2026), Swedish diplomat and writer of crime novels
- Jörgen Mårtensson (born 1959), Swedish orienteer
- Johan Mårtensson (born 1989), Swedish football player
- Lasse Mårtenson (1934–2016), Finnish singer
- Magnus Martensson (born 1966), American musician
- Malte Mårtensson (1916–1973), Swedish association football player
- Marcus Mårtensson (born 1990), Swedish footballer
- Mona Mårtenson (1902–1956), Swedish actress
- Per Mårtensson, Swedish composer and teacher
- Stig Mårtensson, multiple people
- Stina Mårtensson (1882–1962), Swedish missionary
- Tony Mårtensson (born 1980), Swedish ice hockey player
- Torbjörn Mårtensson (born 1972), Swedish athletics competitor
