= Oleksandr Martynenko (journalist) =

Ukrainian journalist (1960–2024)

- Олександр Мартиненко
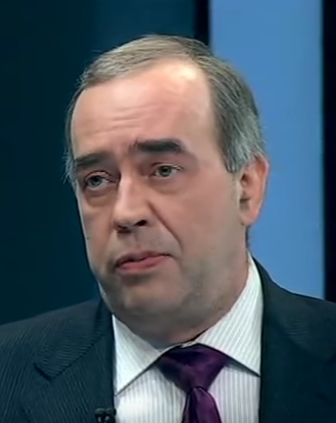
- Martynenko in 2018
- Born: 22 August 1960; Kharkiv, Ukrainian SSR, USSR
- Died: 28 May 2024 (aged 63); Kyiv, Ukraine
- Occupations: Media director, journalist
- Known for: Director of Interfax-Ukraine, press secretary of President Leonid Kuchma

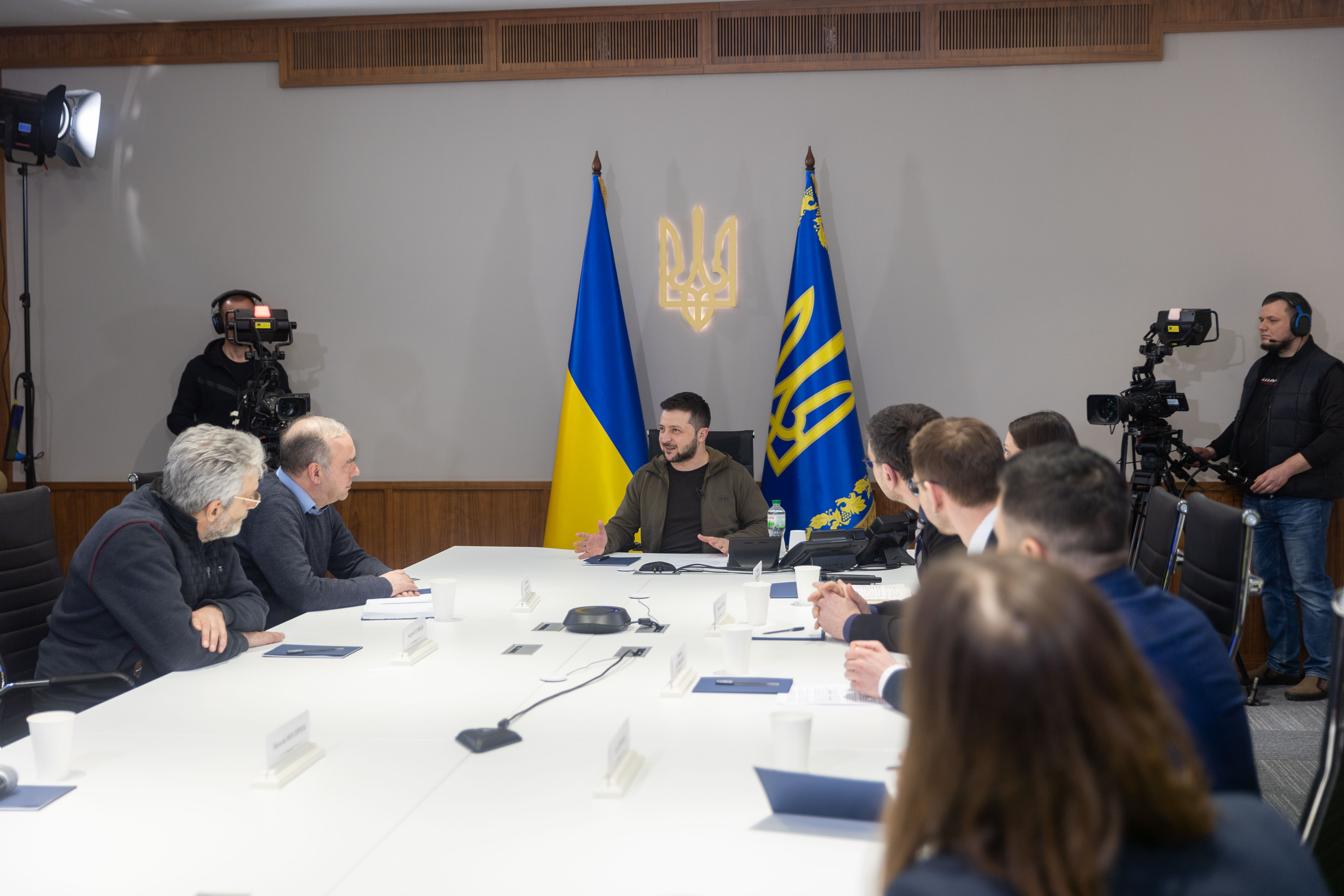
President Volodymyr Zelenskyy (center) addresses Vladlenovych (second from left) during a meeting in 2022.

Oleksandr Vladlenovych Martynenko (Ukrainian: Олександр Владленович Мартиненко; 22 August 1960 – 28 May 2024) was a Ukrainian media director and journalist. He was a director of Interfax-Ukraine from its founding in 1992 to 1998 and from 2003. From 1998 to 2002, he was deputy chief of the Presidential Administration of Ukraine and press secretary of President of Ukraine Leonid Kuchma. He was a long-time author of the magazine Dzerkalo Tyzhnia, where he published articles under the pseudonym "Alexander Makarov". Martynenko died in Kyiv on 28 May 2024 at the age of 63.
