= Pietro De Martino =

Italian mathematician and astronomer

Pietro Di Martino
- Born: 31 May 1707; Faicchio, Kingdom of Naples
- Died: 28 January 1746 (aged 38); Naples, Kingdom of Naples
- Scientific career
- Fields: Astronomy, Mathematics
- Institutions: University of Naples

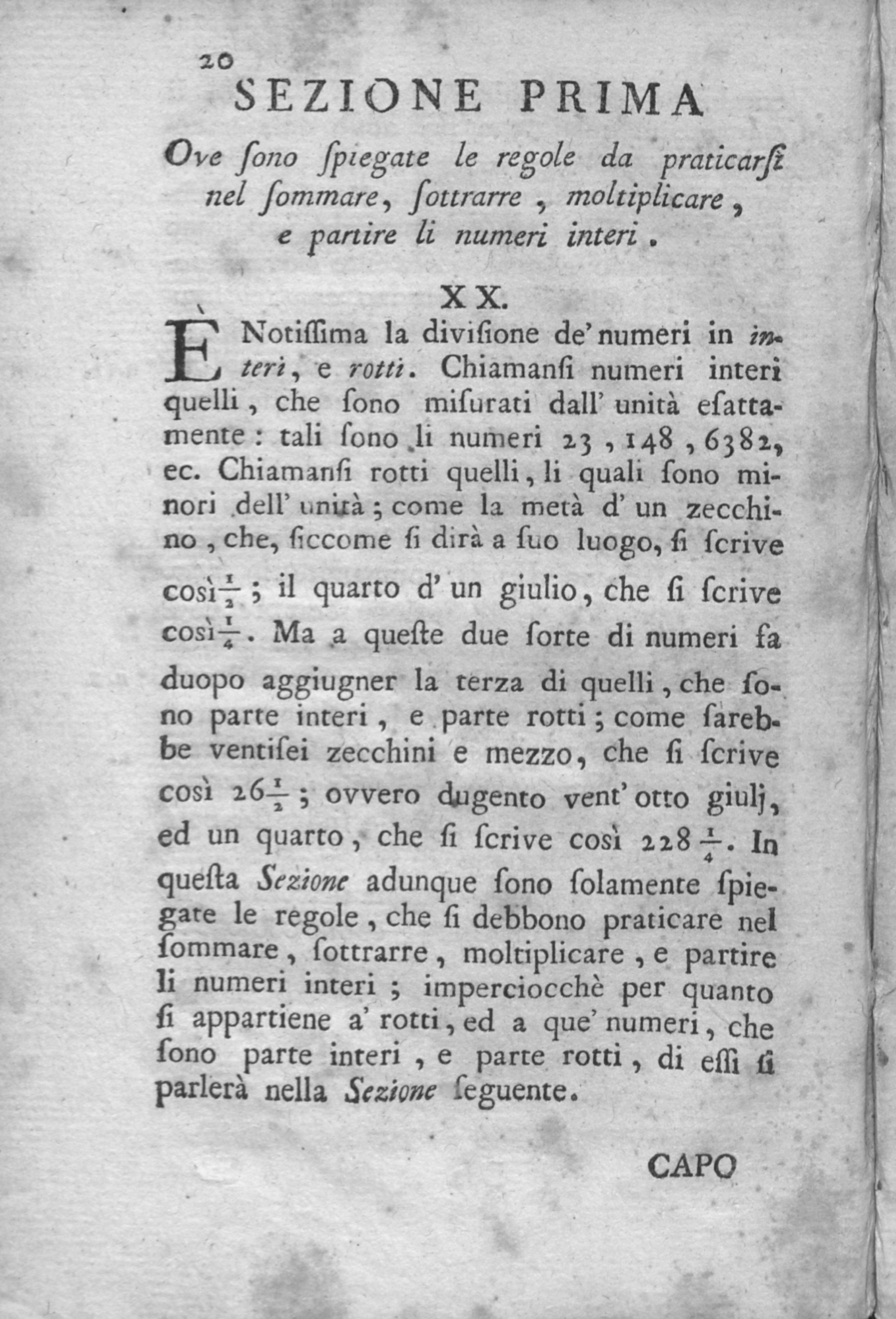
Nuove instituzioni di aritmetica pratica, Section One, 1762 ed.

Pietro De Martino or Di Martino (31 May 1707 – 28 January 1746) was a mathematician and astronomer from the Kingdom of Naples.

== Biography ==
Born in Faicchio, he was the brother of Angelo, professor first of medical physics then of mathematics at the University of Naples; and of Nicola Antonio De Martino, professor of mathematics and director of the Real Corpo degli Ingegneri (Royal Engineers Corp) and Marine Guard. Pietro De Martino was a pupil of Agostino Ariani and of Giacinto De Cristoforo (1650-1730). In 1735, he was assigned to the astronomical and nautical chair at the University of Naples.

He disputed with Roger Joseph Boscovich on the question if it is possible to gain a right result starting from a wrong hypothesis.

He authored various works; his Nuove istituzioni di aritmetica pratica, published originally in 1739 in Naples, had many reprints (the better known of the 1758; one also in Turin in 1762). He died in Naples in 1746.

== Works ==
- Degli elementi della geometria piana composti da Euclide Megarese, e tradotti in italiano, ed illustrati (in Italian). Naples: Alessio Pellecchia. 1785 [1736].
- Philosophiae naturalis institutionum libri tres (in Latin). Naples: Felice Carlo Mosca. 1738.
- Nuove istituzioni di aritmetica pratica (in Italian). Naples: Felice Carlo Mosca. 1739.
- Nuove instituzioni di aritmetica pratica (in Italian). Turin: Stamperia Reale. 1762 [1739].
- De luminis refractione et motu (in Latin). Naples. 1740.
- De corporum quae moventur viribus, earumque aestimandarum ratione (in Latin). Naples: Felice Mosca. 1741.
