= Martina (surname) =

Martina is the most popular surname in Curaçao. It may refer to:

- Churandy Martina (born 1984), Curaçaoan athlete
- Cuco Martina (born 1989), Dutch-Curaçaoan football player
- Derwin Martina (born 1994), Dutch-Curaçaoan football player
- Don Martina (1935–2024), Curaçaoan politician
- Federico Martina (born 1992), Argentine volleyball player
- Gerry Martina (1928–1990), Irish wrestler
- Giovanni Martina (born 1987), Italian football player
- Hemayel Martina (1990–2011), Curaçaoan poet
- Javier Martina (born 1987), Curaçaoan-Dutch footballer
- Joe Martina (1889–1962), American baseball player
- Jurensley Martina (born 1993), Curaçaoan football player
- Marco Martina Rini (born 1990), Italian football player
- Maurizio Martina (born 1978), Italian politician
- Silvano Martina (born 1953), Italian football player
- Steven Martina (born 1961), Curaçaoan politician and businessman
- Tarcisio Martina (1887–1961), Italian Catholic prelate

== See also ==
- Martina (given name)
- Martine (surname)
