= Maarten Van Lieshout =

Belgian footballer

Personal information
- Full name: Maarten Van Lieshout
- Date of birth: 13 August 1985 (age 41)
- Place of birth: Turnhout, Belgium
- Height: 1.76 m (5 ft 9 in)
- Position: Defender

Youth career
- 1995–2005: Willem II

Senior career*
| Years | Team | Apps | (Gls) |
| 2005–2007 | Willem II | 3 | (0) |
| 2007–2008 | KFCV Geel | 19 | (0) |
| 2009–2010 | KV Turnhout | 36 | (0) |
| 2010–2013 | Dessel Sport | 89 | (4) |
| 2013–2015 | KFC Lille | | |
| 2015–2017 | KFC Poppel | | |
- * Club domestic league appearances and goals

Maarten Van Lieshout (born 13 August 1985) is a Belgian former professional footballer who played as a defender.

== Career ==
Born in Turnhout, Van Lieshout grew up in Ravels and began his career 1995 in the Netherlands with Willem II before joining Verbroedering Geel on 20 April 2007. The defender left this club in January 2009 to sign for KV Turnhout.
