= Martinson =

Martinson is an English surname of Scandinavian origin. Notable people with the surname include:

- Allan Martinson, Estonian venture capitalist
- Connie Martinson (1932–2023), American writer and television personality
- Edwin Joseph Martinson (1899–1974), American politician
- Gloria Martinson, American philanthropist
- Harry Martinson (1904–1978), Swedish sailor, author, and poet
- Leslie H. Martinson (1915–2016), American television and film director
- Moa Martinson (1890–1964), Swedish author
- Sergey Martinson (1899–1984), Russian eccentric comic actor
- Steve Martinson (born 1959), American hockey player

== See also ==
- Maris Martinsons, director of the Pacific Rim Institute for the Studies of Management and professor of management
- Māris Martinsons (director)
- Martinson's Beach, Saskatchewan, Canada
