= Martina (given name) =

- Pronunciation: English: /mɑːrˈtiːnə/ German: [maʁˈtiːna] Italian: [marˈtiːna]
- Gender: Feminine
- Language: English, German, Italian, Spanish, Dutch, Czech, Croatian, Serbian, Hungarian, Romanian, Bulgarian, Macedonian, Slovak, Slovenian
- Name day: September 9

Other gender
- Masculine: Martin, Martino

Origin
- Language: Latin
- Meaning: 'belonging to Mars'

Martina is a female given name, the female form of Martin and Martino.

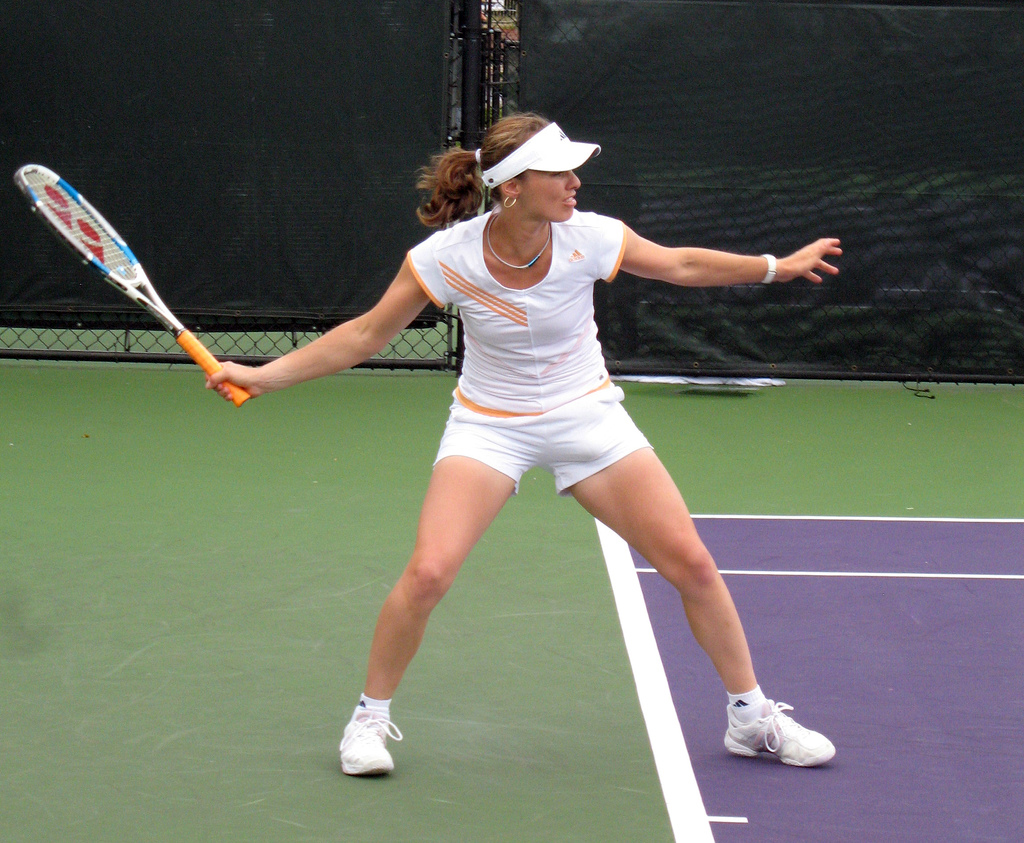
Martina Hingis, Miami, Florida, 2007

== People with the given name ==
- Martina (empress) (died after 641), the niece and second wife of the Byzantine emperor Heraclius
- Martina (daughter of Heraclius), Byzantine princess
- Martina Ambrosi (born 2001), Italian ski jumper
- Martina Arroyo (1937―2026), American operatic soprano
- Martina Attille (born 1959), British filmmaker
- Martina Capurro Taborda (born 1997), Argentine tennis player
- Martina Casiano y Mayor (1881–1958), first female member of the Spanish Society of Physics and Chemistry
- Martina Cavallero (born 1990), Argentine field hockey player
- Martina Chapanay (1799–c. 1887), guerrilla fighter in the Argentine Civil Wars
- Martina Chiacchio (born 2000), Italian weightlifter
- Martina Ćorković (born 1993) Croatian handball player
- Martina Catania (Gotami Theri) (born 1999) Italian Buddhist nun and writer
- Martina Del Trecco (born 2001), Argentine footballer
- Martina Dominici (born 2002), Argentine artistic gymnast
- Martina de la Puente (born 1975), Spanish shot putter
- Martina Favaretto (born 2001), Italian fencer
- Martina Fortkord (born 1973), Swedish alpine skier
- Martina Gedeck (born 1961), German actress
- Martina Gil (born 2003), Argentine rhythmic gymnast
- Martina Gmür (born 1979), Swiss visual artist
- Martina Gusmán (born 1978), Argentine actress
- Martina Hingis (born 1980), Swiss tennis player
- Martina Holečková (born 1984), Slovak politician
- Martina Iñíguez (born 1939), Argentine writer
- Martina Johansson (born 1975), Swedish politician
- Martina Klein (born 1976), Argentine model and TV presenter
- Martina Laird (born 1971), Trinidadian British actress
- Martina Lubyová (1967–2023), Slovak politician
- Martina Maggio (born 2001), Italian artistic gymnast
- Martina McBride (born 1966), American country music singer
- Martina Moser (born 1986), Swiss footballer
- Martina Müller (born 1980), German footballer
- Martina Müller, (born 1982), German tennis player
- Martina Navarro /born 2004), Argentine indoor hockey player
- Martina Navrátilová (born 1956), Czech-American tennis player
- Martina Portocarrero (1949–2022), Peruvian folk singer, cultural researcher, politician
- Martina Pretelli (born 1988), athlete from San Marino who competes in the 100 metres
- Martina Proeber (born 1963), German Olympic diver
- Martina of Rome, Christian martyr (died ca. 266)
- Martina Romero (born 2002), Argentine handball player
- Martina Schindlerová (born 1988), Slovak singer
- Martina Schumacher (born 1972), German painter and conceptual artist
- Martina Silva de Gurruchaga (1790–1873), Argentine patriot
- Martina Šimkovičová (born 1971), Slovak TV presenter and politician
- Martina Sironi (born 1999), know professionally as Cmqmartina, Italian singer-songwriter
- Martina von Schwerin (1789–1875), Swedish salonist
- Martina Sorbara (born 1978), Canadian singer-songwriter
- Martina Stella (born 1984), Italian spokesperson and actress
- Martina Stoessel (born 1997), know professionally as Tini, Argentine actress and singer
- Martina Šurnovská (born 1999), Slovak footballer
- Martina Thörn (born 1991), Swedish handball player
- Martina Topley-Bird (born 1975), British singer
- Martina Velarde (born 1979), Spanish lawyer and politician
- Martina Weil (born 1999), Chilean runner

== Fictional characters ==
- Martina Crespi, from the anime/manga Strike Witches
- Martina Crowe, from Trenton Lee Stewart's children's book series The Mysterious Benedict Society

== See also ==
- Martina (surname)
- Martin (name)
- Martino (given name)
