= Martínez (surname) =

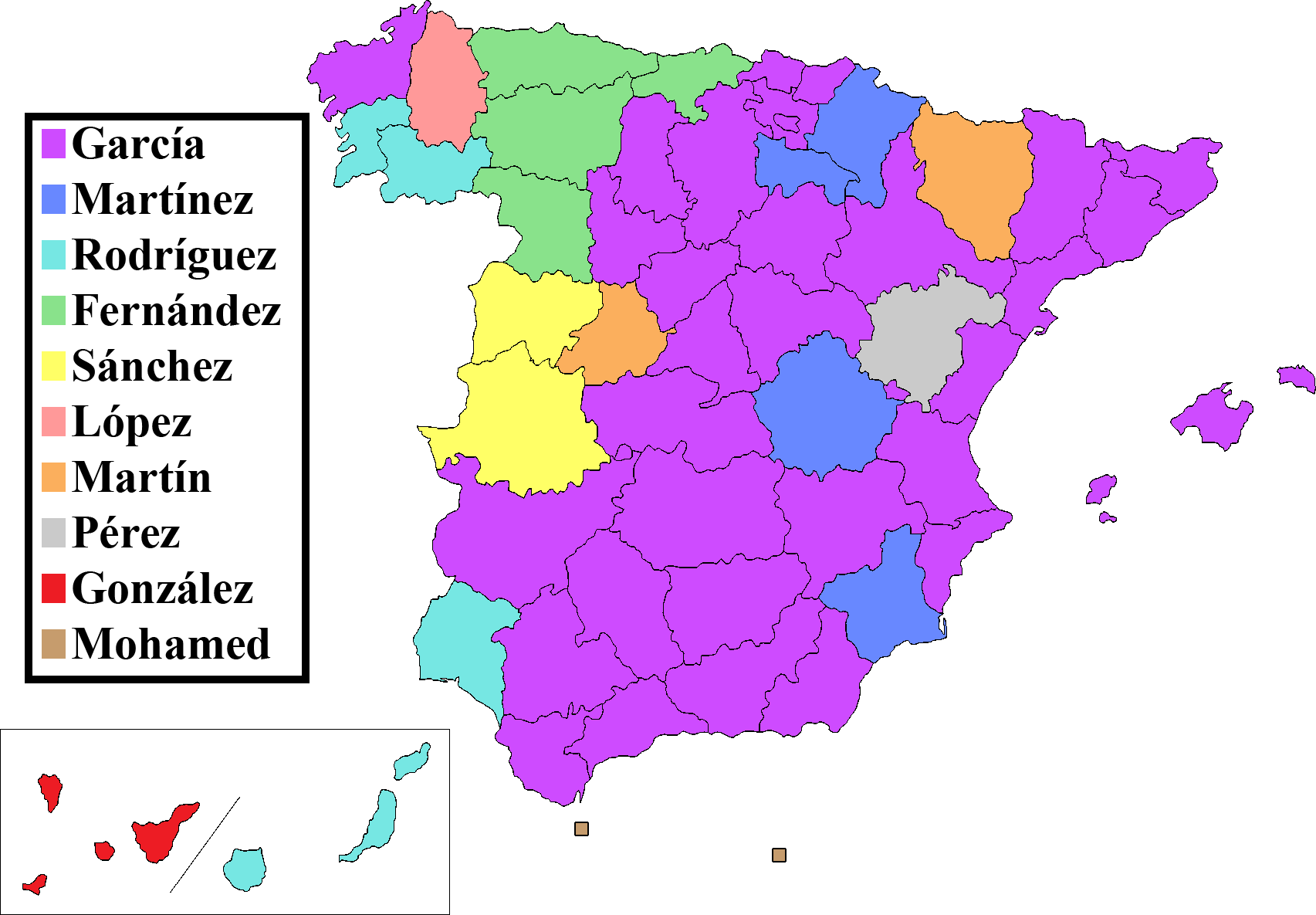
- Martínez is the most common surname in Navarre, La Rioja, Cuenca and Murcia
- Pronunciation: Spanish: [maɾˈtineθ], in Latin America: [maɾˈtines]
- Language: Spanish

Origin
- Meaning: "son of Martín", "son of Martino"
- Region of origin: Iberian Peninsula

Other names
- Variant form: Martines

Martínez is a common surname in the Spanish language. Martínez is the most common surname in the Spanish regions of Navarre, La Rioja, Cuenca and Murcia. There are also variations such as San Martin and Martín (with an accent on the "i").

It originated as a patronymic surname, meaning "son of Martín" (English: Martin).

Among Mozarabs, the name was Arabized to "Mardanish" (e.g. Ibn Mardanish) (as well as other patronymics such as Hernandez and Gomez).

It is also used sometimes as a component word of a multi-word surname such as Martínez del Río. Martínez comes from the personal name "Martin", itself derived from the Latin Martinus, whose root is Mars, the name of the Roman god of fertility and war. The name Martin became popular throughout Christian Europe after it was borne by a famous 4th-century saint who was active in Roman Gaul (now France), Martin of Tours.

Martínez is a widely spread surname (among other European surnames) due in large part to the global influence of the Spanish culture on territories and colonies in the Americas, Africa and Asia. Likewise, due to emigration throughout Europe, Martínez is relatively common in countries neighboring or near Spain, such as: Andorra, Portugal, France, Switzerland and Italy.

In the United States, according to the 1990 Census, "Martinez" ranked nineteenth among all surnames reported, accounting for 0.23% of the population. In France according to a 1990 census, "Martinez" ranked sixteenth among all surnames reported.

The Portuguese equivalent of Martínez is Martins meaning "son of Martin". See Martin (name) § Derived surnames for other patronymic surnames derived from the given name.

== Arts (incl. journalism) ==
Acting and comedy

- A Martinez (born 1948), American actor
- Albert Martinez (born 1961), Filipino actor
- Benito Martinez (born 1971), American actor
- Carlos Martínez (born 1955), Spanish mime actor
- Francesca Martinez (born 1978), English comedian and actor
- James Martinez (born 1980), American actor
- Kris Martinez (born 1973), American comedian and entertainer also known as Kristory
- Liezl Martinez (1967–2015), Filipino actress
- Mariano Martínez (born 1978), Argentine actor and model
- Micaela Martinez DuCasse (1913–1989), American artist, author, and educator
- Natalia Martínez Streignard (born 1970) Venezuelan actress
- Natalie Martinez (born 1984), American model and actress
- Olivier Martinez (born 1966), French actor
- Ray Martínez (born 1950), Cuban-American musician
- Shelly Martinez (born 1980), Mexican American model, actress. Also known as wrestler and valet.
- Ursula Martinez (born 1966), Anglo-Spanish, English-based writer and cabaret performer
- Patrice Martinez (1963–2018), American actress
- Yoya Martinez (1912–2009), Chilean actress

Crafts

- Maria Ramita Martinez (c. 1884–1969), Picuris Pueblo potter

Design and fashion

- Francesca Martinez (born 1978), Italian top model
- Raúl Martínez (1927–1995), Cuban designer, photographer, muralist, and graphic artist.
- Silvia Martínez (born 1965), Venezuelan pageant titleholder
- Soraida Martinez (born 1956), American artist/designer, creator of "Verdadism" art

Journalism

- Albertina Martínez Burgos (1981–2019), Chilean photojournalist
- Andrés Martínez, American newspaper editor of the Los Angeles Times
- Eduardo Martínez Celis (1890–1943), Mexican journalist
- Mónica Martínez (born 1975), Spanish journalist, model and television presenter
- Regina Martínez Pérez (1963–2012), Mexican journalist for Proceso
- Walter Martínez (1941–2026), Uruguayan-Venezuelan journalist

Literature

- Adelaida Martínez Aguilar (1870–?), Mexican teacher, writer, and poet
- Alfonso Martínez de Toledo, medieval Spanish poet
- Claudia Guadalupe Martinez, American children's author
- Guillermo Martínez (born 1962), Argentine novelist
- J. Michael Martinez (born 1978), American poet
- Tomás Eloy Martínez (1934–2010), Argentine novelist and journalist

Music

- Ana María Martínez, Puerto Rican opera singer
- Angie Martinez (born 1971), hiphop artist and radio/television personality
- Benito Martínez (born 1994), Puerto Rican singer known professionally as Bad Bunny
- Cliff Martinez (born 1954), American film-score composer and former drummer
- Cruz Martínez (born 1972), American musician and record producer
- Henry Martínez (1950–2025), Venezuelan songwriter
- Laia Martínez i López (born 1984), Catalan writer and musician
- Linda Martinez (1975–2005), American musician
- Melanie Martinez (born 1995), American singer, songwriter and music video director
- S. A. Martinez, vocalist for the rock band "311"
- Sabu Martinez (1930–1979), American conguero and percussionist

Painting and sculpture

- Ana Maria de Martinez (1937–2012), Salvadoran artist
- Isabel Martinez (artist), Mexican-American artist
- Marion C. Martinez (born 1954), Mexican-American artist
- Oliverio Martínez (1901–1938), Mexican sculptor
- Raúl Martínez (1927–1995), Cuban painter, designer, photographer, muralist and graphic artist
- Santiago Martínez Delgado, Colombian painter and sculptor
- Soraida Martinez (born 1956), Artist, Creator of Verdadism
- Xavier Martínez (1869–1943), Mexican American painter artist

== Business ==
- Mariano Martinez (entrepreneur) (born 1944), Mexican American inventor, entrepreneur and restaurateur
- Vicente Martinez Ybor (1818–1896), Spanish-American cigar industrialist (entrepreneur) in Tampa, Florida
- Edward Martinez Sarasota (Realtor) (born 1954), Cuban American entrepreneur and Investor in Sarasota, Florida

== Military ==
- Arsenio Martínez-Campos (1831–1900), Spanish officer
- Esteban José Martínez Fernández y Martínez de la Sierra, 18th-century Spanish naval commander
- Gustavo Álvarez Martínez (1937–1989), Honduran military officer
- Jerry P. Martinez, U.S. Air Force lieutenant general
- Joe P. Martinez (1920–1943), U.S. Army soldier during World War II
- Juan Antonio Martínez Varela (born 1952), Minister of National Defense of El Salvador from 1999 to 2004
- Juan Martínez de Ampiés (died 1533), Spanish soldier, founder of Santa Ana de Coro (Venezuela)

== Politics and law ==
- Alicia Austria-Martinez (born 1940), Associate Justice of the Supreme Court of the Philippines
- Andrés Martínez Trueba (1884–1959), President of Uruguay from 1951 to 1955
- Angela Martinez (politician) (born 1971), American politician from Kansas
- Augusto Martínez Sánchez (1923–2013), Cuban politician
- Banesa Martinez Roldán (born 1982), Uruguayan-born Swedish politician
- Bernard Martínez Valerio (born 1962), Honduran politician
- Bob Martinez (born 1934), Spanish-American former Governor of the State of Florida (born in Tampa, Florida)
- Carmen Dorantes Martínez (born 1957), Mexican politician
- Céline Thiébault-Martinez (born 1974), French politician
- Constanza Martínez (born 1987), Chilean politician
- Cruz Martínez Esteruelas (1932–2000), Spanish politician
- Daniel Martínez (politician) (born 1957), Uruguayan politician and engineer
- Delfina Martínez, Uruguayan activist
- Eduardo Martínez Celis (1890–1943), Mexican politician and journalist
- Elvin Martinez (born 1934), U.S. politician, Florida House of Representatives
- Felix Martínez de Torrelaguna, acting Governor of New Mexico
- Henriette Martinez (1949), French politician
- Israel Huaytari Martínez (born 1985), Bolivian politician
- Jean-Claude Martinez (1945), French politician
- Jennifer Martínez, American human rights lawyer
- José Martínez Berasáin, Spanish Carlist politician
- Kareem Martinez, Belizean police corporal and convict
- Kathleen Martínez (born 1966) Dominican lawyer and diplomat
- Kathleen Martinez (TikToker), American immigration lawyer and social media personality
- Miguel Martinez (born 1978), Dominican-American New York City Council member, convicted of conspiracy, sentenced to five years in prison
- Louis Alphonse, Duke of Anjou (born 1974), Prince Louis Alphonse of Bourbon y Martinez-Bordiú, Louis XX, King of France and Navarre
- Maria L. Martinez, American labor activist and community advocate
- Marco Antonio Martinez Dabdoub, mayor of Nogales, Sonora, Mexico
- Martín C. Martínez (1859–1946), Uruguayan politician
- Matthew G. Martínez (1929–2011), former U.S. Representative from California
- Maximiliano Hernández Martínez (1882–1966), former president of El Salvador
- Mel Martinez (born 1946), Cuban-American U.S. Senator from Florida
- Michael N. Martinez, Utah lawyer
- Miguel Martínez de Pinillos Sáenz, Spanish Carlist politician and entrepreneur
- Mike Martinez (born 1969), American politician from Texas
- Nury Martinez (born 1973), American politician, former President of the Los Angeles City Council
- Philip Ray Martinez (1953–2021), American judge
- Raúl L. Martínez (born 1949), Cuban politician, former mayor of Hialeah, Florida, United States
- Reynaldo Martinez, American politician
- Reynaldo Leroy Martinez, first Hispanic Chief of Staff in the United States Senate, Washington, D.C.
- Rose Martinez (born 1958), Filipino-born American politician in Hawaii
- Susana Martínez (born 1959), first female Governor of New Mexico
- Sylvia Martínez Elizondo (1947–2020), Mexican politician
- Tomás Martínez (1820–1873), President of Nicaragua (1857–1867)

== Sciences ==
- Alberto Martinez Piedra (1926–2021), professor
- Amalia Martínez, Mexican physicist
- German Martinez Hidalgo (1929–2009), physicist, mathematician and astronomer
- Jennifer S. Martinez, American nanoscientist
- Kirk Martinez professor, image processing
- Lissa Martinez (born 1954), American ocean engineer
- Marta Martínez Vázquez (born 1973), Spanish antenna engineer
- Maximino Martínez (1888–1964), Mexican botanist
- Ronaldo Martínez (born 1953), cancer survivor appearing in anti-smoking television commercials
- Rosa Martínez and Eliana Martínez, child with AIDS (Eliana) and her mother (Rosa)
- Wendy L. Martinez, American statistician

== Society and clergy ==
- Fabio Martínez Castilla (1950–2023), Mexican Roman Catholic archbishop
- Josefa Jara Martinez (1894–1987), Filipino social worker, suffragist and civic leader
- Luis María Martínez (1881–1956), Mexican Roman Catholic archbishop
- Mario Díaz Martínez (born 1965), member of the World Scout Committee
- Maximino Martínez Miranda (born 1951), Mexican Roman Catholic bishop
- Nelson Martínez Rust (1944–2026), Venezuelan Roman Catholic bishop
- Rafael Francisco Martínez Sáinz (1935–2016), Mexican Roman Catholic bishop
- Salvador Martínez Pérez (1933–2019), Mexican Roman Catholic bishop

== Sports ==
A–M

- Adrian Martinez (American football) (born 2000), American quarterback
- Adrián Martínez (baseball) (born 1996), Mexican baseball player
- Alberto Martín Acosta Martinez (born 1977), Uruguayan football player
- Alec Martinez (born 1987), Canadian hockey player
- Alma Martínez (footballer) (born 1981), Mexican football player
- Andrés Martínez (footballer) (born 1972), Uruguayan football player
- Ángel Martínez (baseball) (born 2002), Dominican baseball player
- Armando Martínez (boxer) (born 1961), Cuban boxer
- Blake Martinez (born 1994), American football player
- Carlos Martínez (1965–?), Venezuelan baseball player
- Carmelo Martínez (born 1960), Puerto Rican baseball player, first base and outfield
- Chantal Martínez (born 1990), Panamanian boxer
- Chito Martínez (1965–2025), Belizean-American baseball player
- Chito Martínez (footballer) (born 1977), Venezuelan football player
- Conchita Martínez (born 1972), Spanish tennis player
- Conchita Martínez Granados (born 1976), Spanish tennis player
- Cristhian Martínez (born 1982), baseball player from the Dominican Republic
- Damien Martinez (born 2004), American football player
- Dave Martinez (born 1964), American baseball player and coach
- David Martínez (chess player) (born 1981), Spanish chess player
- David Martínez (racing driver) (born 1981), Mexican racing driver
- Dennis Martínez (born 1955), Nicaraguan baseball pitcher
- Diego Martínez (Mexican footballer, born 1981)
- Edgar Martínez (born 1963), Puerto Rican American baseball player, hitter
- Emil Martínez (born 1982), Honduran footballer
- Emiliano Martínez (born 1992), Argentine footballer
- Emilio Martínez (footballer, born 1981), Paraguayan footballer
- Ernesto Martínez Jr. (born 1999), French-Cuban baseball player
- Esmery Martínez (born 2000), Dominican basketball player
- Eulogio Martínez (1935–1984), footballer
- Félix Martínez Mata (born 1974), baseball player
- Fernando Martínez Perales (born 1967), Spanish footballer
- Fidel Martínez (born 1990), Ecuadorian footballer
- Francisca Martínez (born 1966), Mexican race walker
- Gérald Martinez (born 1955), French rugby player
- Germán Martínez (swimmer) (born 1979), Colombian swimmer
- Gilberto Martínez (born 1979), Costa Rican footballer
- Glenn Martinez (born 1981), American wide receiver
- Gonzalo Martínez (born 1975), Colombian footballer
- Guillermo Martínez (athlete) (born 1981), Cuban javelin thrower
- Henry Martínez (boxer) (born 1971), bantamweight boxer of El Salvador
- Iñigo Martínez (born 1991), Spanish footballer
- Israel Martínez (born 1981), Mexican footballer
- Izzy Martinez (born 1982), American wrestling coach
- Jack Michael Martínez (born 1981), Dominican basketball player
- Jackson Martínez (born 1986), Colombian footballer
- Jairo Martínez (born 1978), Honduran football forward
- Jaume Martinez Vich (born 1993), Spanish professional pickleball player
- Javi Martínez (born 1988), Spanish footballer
- Javier Martínez (baseball) (born 1977), baseball player
- Javier Omar Martínez (born 1971), Honduran footballer
- Javier Martínez González (born 1987), Spanish footballer
- J. D. Martinez (born 1987), American baseball player
- Jesús Martínez (boxer) (born 1976), Mexican boxer
- Jesus Martinez (fighter) (born 1983), American mixed martial artist
- Jesús Martínez Barrios (born 1985), Spanish bullfighter
- Joe Martinez (baseball) (born 1983), American baseball player
- Jorge Andrés Martínez (born 1983), Uruguayan footballer
- Jorge Humberto Martínez (born 1975), Colombian cyclist
- José Martínez (born 1988), Venezuelan baseball player
- José Martínez Ahumada (José Martínez "Limeño"; 1936–2015), Spanish bullfighter
- Josef Martínez (born 1993), Venezuelan footballer
- Josué Martínez, Costa Rican footballer
- J. P. Martínez (born 1996), Cuban baseball player
- Juan Manuel Martínez (born 1985), Argentine footballer
- Juan Manuel Martínez Jourdan (born 1981), Uruguayan football manager and former player
- Juan Martínez Brito (born 1958), Cuban discus thrower
- Juan Máximo Martínez (1947–2021), Mexican long-distance runner
- Julen Luis Arizmendi Martínez (born 1976), Spanish chess grandmaster
- Julio Aparicio Martínez (born 1932), Spanish bullfighter
- Julio Enrique Martínez (born 1985), Salvadoran footballer
- Kathleen Martínez (born 1966), Dominican archaeologist, lawyer, and diplomat
- Lautaro Martínez (born 1997), Argentine footballer
- Lázaro Martínez (sprinter) (born 1962), Cuban sprinter
- Lester Martínez (born 1995), Guatemalan professional boxer
- Lisandro Martínez (born 1998), Argentine footballer
- Leandro Antonio Martínez (born 1989), Argentine-Italian footballer
- Lucas Martínez (field hockey) (born 1993), Argentine field hockey player
- Luís Fernando Martinez (born 1980), Brazilian footballer
- "Punishment" Luis Martinez (born 1982), American wrestler better known as Damian Priest
- Magdelín Martínez (born 1976), Cuban triple jumper
- Manuel Martínez Lara (born 1980), Spanish footballer
- Maria Martinez, Native-American potter in the United States
- María José Martínez Sánchez (born 1982), Spanish tennis player
- Mariano Martínez (cyclist) (born 1948), French former professional road racing cyclist
- Mario Martínez (footballer, born 1989), Honduran footballer
- Mario Martinez (tennis) (born 1961), Bolivian tennis player
- Marty Martínez (1941–2007), sports manager, coach, and scout
- Mayte Martínez (born 1976), Spanish runner
- Mercedes Martinez (born 1980), American professional wrestler
- Michael Martínez (baseball) (born 1982), Major League Baseball player from the Dominican Republic
- Michael Christian Martinez (born 1996), Filipino figure skater
- Miguel Ángel Martínez (Argentine footballer), (born 1984)

N–Z

- Nick Martinez (baseball) (born 1990), American baseball player
- Orelvis Martínez (born 2001), Dominican baseball player
- Orlando Martínez (1944–2021), former Cuban bantamweight boxer
- Osvaldo Martínez (born 1986), Paraguayan footballer
- Pamela Martinez (born 1989), American professional wrestler better known as Bayley
- Pedro Martínez (born 1971), Dominican baseball player
- Pedro Martínez (basketball) (born 1961), Spanish basketball coach
- Pedro Martínez (golfer) (born 1963), Paraguayan golfer
- Pedro Martínez (left-handed pitcher) (born 1968), Dominican baseball player
- Pedro Martínez de la Rosa (born 1971) Spanish Formula One driver
- Poppies Martinez (born 1981), American mixed martial artist
- Rafa Martínez (born 1982), Spanish basketball player
- Ramón Martínez (infielder) (born 1972), American baseball player, infielder
- Ramón Martínez (pitcher) (born 1968), Dominican Republic baseball player, pitcher
- Roberto Martínez (born 1973), Spanish football manager and former player
- Roberto Juan Martínez (born 1946), Argentine footballer
- Rogelio Martínez (boxer) (born 1974), a Dominican Republic boxer
- Román Martínez (boxer) (born 1983), Puerto Rican professional boxer
- Rubén Iván Martínez (born 1984), Spanish footballer
- Rubert Martínez (born 1985), Cuban judoka
- Ryan Martinez (fighter) (born 1987), American mixed martial artist
- Saúl Martínez (born 1976), Honduran footballer
- Serafín Martínez (born 1984), Spanish road cyclist
- Sergio Martínez (boxer) (born 1975), Argentine boxer
- Sergio Daniel Martínez (born 1969), Uruguayan footballer
- Seth Martinez (born 1994), American baseball player
- Shelly Martinez (born 1980), Mexican American professional wrestler (as Ariel) and valet (as Salinas). Also known as model, actress (using her name Shelly Martinez)
- Ted Martínez (born 1947), Dominican baseball player, shortstop
- Tippy Martinez (born 1950), American retired baseball pitcher
- Tino Martinez (born 1967), American baseball player, first base
- Tomás Martínez (footballer) (born 1995), Argentine footballer
- Tony Martínez (1940–1991), American baseball player
- Víctor Martínez (baseball) (born 1978), Venezuelan baseball player, catcher
- Víctor Martínez (bodybuilder) (born 1973), professional bodybuilder from the Dominican Republic
- Walter Martínez (footballer, born 1982), Honduran footballer
- Will Martinez (born 1980), American mixed martial artist
- Yamilé Martínez (born 1970), Cuban basketball player
- Yudelkis Martínez (born 1979), Cuban runner

== Disambiguation pages ==
- Adrián Martínez (disambiguation)
- Alberto Martínez (disambiguation)
- Andrés Martinez (disambiguation)
- Armando Martínez (disambiguation)
- Carlos Martínez (disambiguation)
- David Martínez (disambiguation)
- Fernando Martínez (disambiguation)
- Javier Martínez (disambiguation)
- Jorge Martinez (disambiguation)
- José Martínez (disambiguation)
- Mariano Martínez (disambiguation)
- Michael Martínez (disambiguation)
- Pedro Martínez (disambiguation)
- Roberto Martinez (disambiguation)
- Sergio Martínez (disambiguation)
