= Economy of North Rhine-Westphalia =

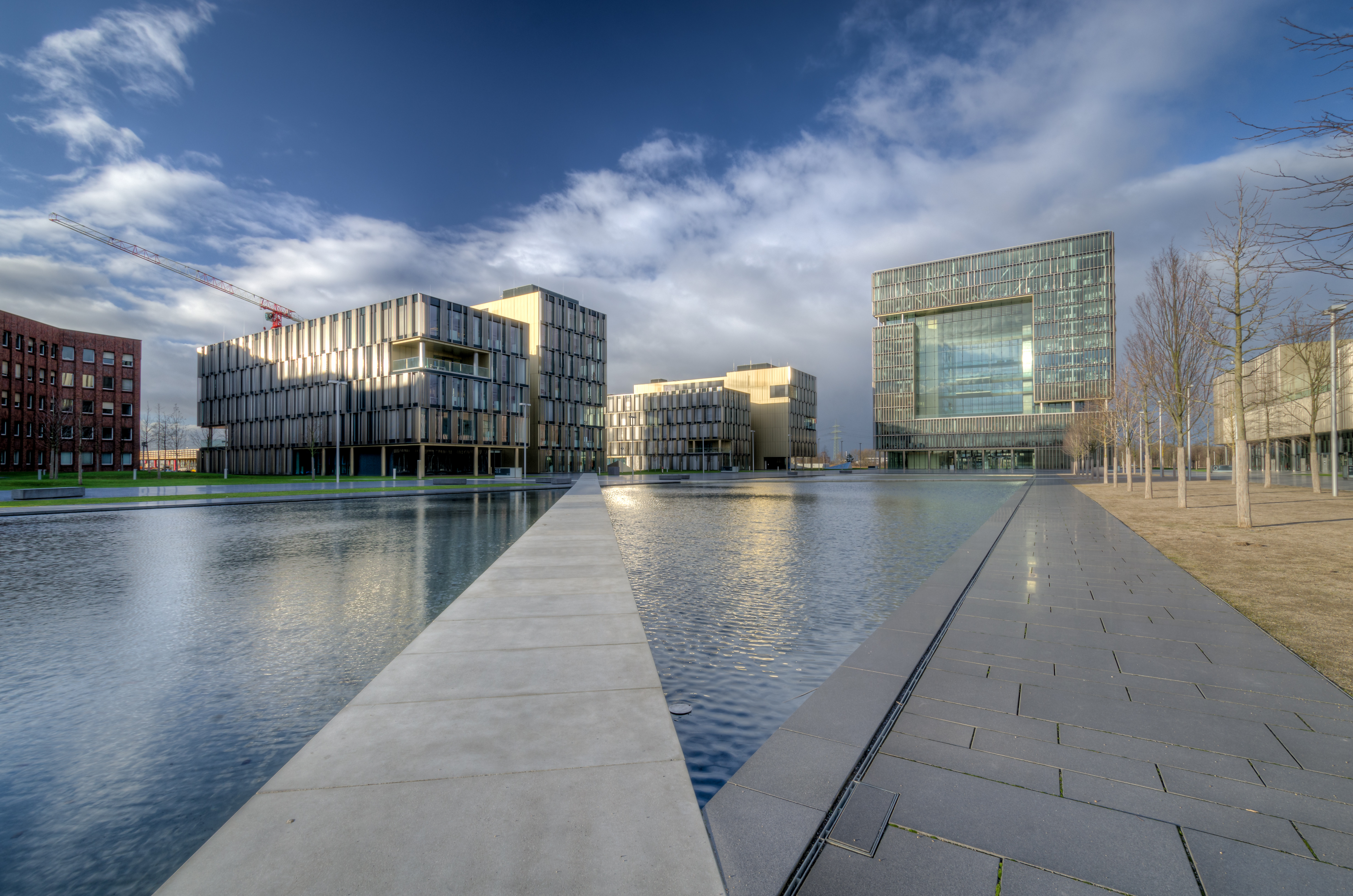
ThyssenKrupp headquarters in Essen

North Rhine-Westphalia (NRW) has consistently been Germany's economic powerhouse, with the largest economy among the German states by GDP figures. If NRW were a sovereign country, it would have an economy comparable to that of Saudi Arabia in terms of nominal gross domestic product (GDP) as of 2014. Of all German states, most money from abroad is invested in NRW.

== History ==
In the 1950s and 1960s, the state was known as the Land von Kohle und Stahl (land of coal and steel). In the post-WWII recovery, the Ruhr was one of the most important industrial regions in Europe, and contributed to the German Wirtschaftswunder. As of the late 1960s, repeated crises had led to contractions of these industrial branches. On the other hand, producing sectors, particularly in mechanical engineering and metal and iron working industries, experienced substantial growth. Some former coal mining areas retain high unemployment rates. Despite this structural change and an economic growth which was under the national average, the 2007 GDP of 529.4 billion euro (21.8 percent of the total German GDP) made the land the economically most important in Germany, as well as one of the most important economic areas in the world. On a per capita basis, however, North Rhine-Westphalia remains one of the weaker among the Western German Länder, or states.

== Economic indicators ==
Of Germany’s top 100 corporations, 37 are based in North Rhine-Westphalia. NRW has the second-highest exports of all German states behind Baden-Württemberg (2019) and the third-highest research and development expenditures behind Baden-Württemberg and Bavaria (2023). As of June 2014, the unemployment rate is 8.2%, second highest among all western German states.

Year	2000	2001	2002	2003	2004	2005	2006	2007	2008	2009	2010	2011	2012	2013	2014	2015	2016	2017	2018
Unemployment rate in %	9.2	8.8	9.2	10.0	10.2	12.0	11.4	9.5	8.5	8.9	8.7	8.1	8.1	8.3	8.2	8.0	7.7	7.4	6.8

North Rhine-Westphalia attracts companies from both Germany and abroad, with 26 of the 50 largest German companies based in Germany's most westerly federal state. These include leading German corporations such as E.ON (energy), Deutsche Telekom (telecommunications), Deutsche Post World Net (logistics), Metro AG (food trade), ThyssenKrupp (automotive supplier), RWE (energy) and Rewe Gruppe (trade). The state can rightly claim the most foreign direct investments (FDI) anywhere in Germany. With 28.7 percent (187.6 billion euros), North Rhine-Westphalia recorded by far the highest direct investment share in Germany of all 16 federal states in 2008.

NRW.INVEST

Around 11,500 foreign companies from the most important investment countries control their German or European operations from bases in North Rhine-Westphalia. This means that almost a quarter of the foreign companies in Germany are domiciled there. These include many international global players such as 3M, BP, Ericsson, Ford, LG Electronics, QVC, Sony, Renault, Toyota, and Vodafone. The companies employ a total of over 582,000 people. Their activities range from pure production to sophisticated services.

There have been many changes in the state's economy in recent times. Among them, the creative industries have come to outrank the mining sector in terms of employment. Industrial heritage sites are now workplaces for designers, artists and the advertising industry. The Ruhr region, formerly known as the "land of coal and steel" (Land von Kohle und Stahl), has - since the 1960s - undergone a significant structural change away from coal mining and steel industry. Many rural parts of Eastern Westphalia, Bergisches Land and the Lower Rhine ground their economy on "Hidden Champions" in various sectors.

== Issues ==
Due to underfunding, citizen resistance to major projects and a lack of staff, political willingness and planning capacities, the state's infrastructure is seen as in need of improvement.

== See also ==
- Hengst Automotive
- Institut für Mobil- und Satellitenfunktechnik
- NRW.Bank
