= Javier Martínez =

Javier or Javi Martínez may refer to:

== Sportspeople ==
=== Football ===
- Javier Martínez (footballer, born 1971), Honduran defender
- Javier Martínez (football manager) (born 1972), Mexican football manager
- Javi Martínez (footballer, born 1987), Spanish former goalkeeper
- Javi Martínez (born 2 September 1988), Spanish midfielder for Bayern Munich
- Javi Martínez (footballer, born 1 July 1988) Spanish former right midfielder
- Javi Martínez (footballer, born 1989), Spanish forward for Náxara
- Javi Martínez (footballer, born 1997), Spanish forward for Real Unión
- Javi Martínez (footballer, born 1999), Spanish winger for Osasuna

=== Other sports ===
- Javier Martínez (sprinter) (born 1953), Spanish Olympic sprinter
- Javier Martínez (Spanish boxer) (born 1968), Spanish Olympic boxer
- Javier Martínez (baseball) (born 1977), Puerto Rican baseball player
- Javier Martínez (Mexican boxer) (born 1986), Mexican boxer

== Others ==
- Javier Martínez (bishop), Spanish prelate of the Catholic Church
- Javier Martínez, drummer and singer of rock band Manal
- Javier Martínez (politician), American politician
