= Jansky (music band) =

Mallorcan electronic music duo

- Origin: Palma, Balearic Islands
- Genres: Electronic, "electroverse"
- Years active: 2012–present
- Members: Jaume Reus Viver, Laia Malo

Jansky is a Mallorcan electronic music duo who self-describe their sound as "electroverse", formed in Palma by producer and environmental scientist Jaume Reus Viver and poet-singer Laia Martínez i López (also known as Laia Malo).

== Background and style ==
Their work blends spoken word poetry (often in Catalan) with live flute performances, sample-based electronics, nature recordings and club rhythms. In an interview, they stated:

"We introduced effect pedals (for the flute and the voice)… And the synthesizers are played live… We record ourselves including birds… It’s like a postcard with sound."[3]

== Career ==
Jansky have appeared at major international festivals including Sónar, Liverpool Sound City, Jazzablanca (Morocco) and Seoul Music Week. In 2021 they opened the Mercat de Música Viva de Vic in Catalonia, and in 2024 they appeared at the closing event of the Venice Biennale’s Catalan Pavilion.

Since 2013, they have developed an international career with performances across Europe and a strong presence in the European counterculture scene.

== Awards ==
- 2018: SUNS Europe Award (Italy) for Best European Group in a minority language.
- 2019: Special Jury Award at the 2nd Premis Enderrock de la Música Balear.
- 2021: Insectasynth project awarded by the BBC Sound of the Year Awards for Best Studio Recording.

== Selected discography ==
- Nova volta (RL, 2024)
- Insecta dance music (RL, 2022) – four soundscapes and seven tracks made exclusively from sampled insect sounds.
- Insectasynth EP (RL, 2021)
- Desori subversiu (RL, 2020)
- This is electroverse (Hidden Track Records, 2018)
- ÉÈ (Primeros Pasitos, 2015)
- Un big bang a la gibrella (Primeros Pasitos, 2013)
- Parasonic (self-released, 2012)
