= Ronaldo Martínez =

Ronaldo Martínez may refer to:

- Ronaldo Martínez (activist) (born 1953), Puerto Rican cancer activist
- Ronaldo Martínez (footballer) (born 1996), Paraguayan footballer
