= Jennifer Martinez =

Jennifer Martinez may refer to:

- Jenny Martinez, American legal scholar and academic administrator
- Jennifer S. Martinez, American nanoscientist
