= Miguel Ángel Martínez =

Miguel Angel Martínez may refer to:

- Miguel Ángel Martínez (actor) (1954-2025), Dominican stage and theatre actor
- Miguel Ángel Martínez (Argentine footballer) (born 1984)
- Miguel Ángel Martínez (Spanish footballer) (born 1995)
- Miguel Ángel Martínez (swimmer) (born 1984), Spanish swimmer
- Miguel Ángel Martínez-González (born 1957), Spanish physician, epidemiologist, and nutrition researcher
- Miguel Ángel Martínez Martínez (born 1940), Spanish politician
- Miguel Ángel Martínez Torres, Spanish cyclist

== See also ==
- Miguel Martinez (disambiguation)
