= Predimed =

Large Spanish primary prevention trial

PREDIMED (Prevención con Dieta Mediterránea (Prevention with Mediterranean Diet)) was a large Spanish primary prevention trial which included 7,447 Spanish participants (55–80 years, 58% women) who were at high risk for cardiovascular disease, but otherwise healthy (initially free of cardiovascular disease). They were randomly assigned to receive interventions with intensive education to one of three diets:

1. Mediterranean diet supplemented with extra-virgin olive oil.
2. Mediterranean diet supplemented with nuts.
3. Control diet encouraging low-fat food items.

The trial was planned for six years, but it was terminated early after a median follow-up of 4.8 years, and demonstrated that both Mediterranean diet groups reached a statistically significant reduction in the rate of the composite cardiovascular primary end-point of myocardial infarction, stroke, or cardiovascular death. This corresponded to an absolute reduction in 3 less cardiovascular events per 1000 patient-years, or a 30% relative risk reduction. Other important observed benefits included a strong reduction in peripheral artery disease, breast cancer, and atrial fibrillation (only associated with the consumption of extra-virgin olive oil).

== Criticisms ==
Some criticisms included that the protocol for the low-fat control group was changed during the trial, there were losses to follow up in the low-fat group which may have biased the results, and that a true low-fat diet was not achieved by the control group. Additionally, participants lived in a Mediterranean country. Thus, it is unclear if the results will be applicable to other non-Mediterranean settings. Despite these criticisms, there is no other dietary pattern with such a strong evidence of cardiovascular benefit, supported by this major trial and by the Lyon Diet-Heart Study but also reinforced by a multitude of other large and well-conducted observational studies. The transferability of the Mediterranean diet to other geographical regions far from the Mediterranean Sea represents the next main challenges.

Arnav Agarwal and John Ioannidis note that "republication may not solve multiple problems that remain, including the inappropriateness of stopping early given the revised results and the effects on over 200 secondary publications" and "multiple contradictions between data reported across PREDIMED publications suggest a more generic problem with the trial's quality". The core publication was retracted and republished as a non-randomised study.

== Network ==
The trial was multicenter with eleven field centers:

- Málaga
- Sevilla
- Baleares
- Barcelona, two centers
- Reus
- Navarra
- Vitoria
- Valencia
- Two other centers were late incorporations (Belvitge and Canary Islands).

The field work started in 2003 in the vanguard center of PREDIMED-NAVARRA (University of Navarra) and the trial was completed in 2011 following the recommendation of the Data and Safety Monitoring Board, Xavier Pi-Sunyer, Frank B. Hu, Joan Sabaté and Carlos A. González). The main paper with the final cardiovascular results was published in 2013, but retracted and immediately republished in 2018 because of errors in statistical methodology, which were revised in the republished paper.

== Principal investigators ==
The coordinators and principal investigators of the PREDIMED Research Networks were R. Estruch (2003–2005) from Hospital Clinic (Barcelona) and M.A. Martinez-González (2006–2013) from University of Navarra (Spain).
