= Marta Martínez-Vázquez =

Spanish antenna engineer

Marta Martínez-Vázquez (born 1973) is a Spanish electrical engineer known for her work on the design of antennas, especially for personal electronics.

== Education and career ==
Martínez-Vázquez is originally from Santiago de Compostela, where she was born in 1973. She studied telecommunications engineering at the Technical University of Valencia, earning an engineering diploma (the equivalent of a master's degree) there in 1997 and completing her Ph.D. in 2003. Her doctoral dissertation won the 2004 best dissertation award of the university.

She came to work for the Institut für Mobil- und Satellitenfunktechnik in Germany in 1999, as a postdoctoral researcher with the support of the Pedro Barrié de la Maza Foundation, and continued there as a permanent research staff member from 2000 to 2021. In 2021 she moved to Renesas Electronics as a senior marketing and applications engineer, focusing on antennas for vehicular radar.

== Book ==
Martínez-Vázquez is an editor of Handbook on Small Antennas (with Lluis Jofre Roca and Raquel Serrano, Brussels: EurAAP AISBL, 2012).

== Recognition ==
In 2013 the IEEE Antennas and Propagation Society gave Martínez-Vázquez their inaugural Lot Shafai Mid-Career Distinguished Achievement Award, "for contribution to the development of antenna systems for practical applications from UHF to mmwaves and giving visibility to women engineers".

Martínez-Vázquez was elected as an IEEE Fellow in 2017, "for leadership in integrated signal-aware technologies for antennas and global navigation satellite system arrays".
