= Miguel Martinez =

Miguel Martinez may refer to:

- Miguel Martinez (basketball) (born 1989), Lebanese basketball player
- Miguel Martinez (politician), New York City Council member
- Miguel Martinez (cyclist) (born 1976), French mountain biker
- Miguel Martínez (actor) (born 1991), Mexican actor
- Miguel Martínez (wrestler) (born 1991), Cuban sport wrestler
- Miguel Martínez, footballer for the Honduran club C.D. Victoria
- Miguel Martínez Domínguez (1921–2014), Mexican musician, composer and arranger of mariachi
- Miguel Martínez (Spanish footballer) (born 1981), Spanish football goalkeeper
- Miguel Martínez (Paraguayan footballer) (born 1998), Paraguayan football goalkeeper
- Miguel Edgardo Martínez (born 1965), Honduran politician

== See also ==
- Miguel Angel Martínez (disambiguation)
- Michael Martínez (disambiguation)
