= Armando Martínez =

Armando Martínez may refer to:

- Armando Martínez (boxer) (born 1961), Cuban boxer
- Armando Martínez (cyclist) (1931–1969), Mexican cyclist
- Armando Martinez (politician) (born 1976), American politician in Texas
- Armando Martínez, baptismal name of Alejandro Máynez (born 1970s), Mexican serial killer
- Armando Quintero Martínez (born 1954), Mexican politician

== See also ==
- Martínez (surname)
