= Michael Martínez =

Michael Martínez may refer to:

- Michael Martinez (Tolkien scholar), American author and Tolkien scholar
- Michael Martínez (baseball) (born 1982), Dominican baseball player
- Michael Christian Martinez (born 1996), Filipino Olympic figure skater
- Michael N. Martinez, Utah lawyer
- Mike Martinez (born 1969), American politician from Texas
- J. Michael Martinez (born 1978), American poet

== See also ==
- Miguel Martinez (disambiguation)
