= Martines =

Martines is a surname of Spanish origin, a variation of Martínez. Notable people with the surname include:

- Alessandra Martines, Italian-French dancer and actress
- Joan Martines, 16th Century cartographer from Messina
- José Martines, Bolivian footballer
- Julia Martines, better known as Julia O'Faolain (1932–2020), Irish writer
- Marianna Martines, Austrian composer, singer, and pianist
- Nicolo Martines, Papal nuncio in Wien
- Stephen Martines, American actor
