= Mariano Martínez =

Mariano Martínez may refer to:

- Mariano Martínez (cyclist) (born 1948), French former professional road racing cyclist
- Mariano Martínez (actor) (born 1978), Argentine actor and model
- Mariano Martinez (entrepreneur) (born 1944), Mexican American inventor, entrepreneur and restaurateur
- Mariano Martínez (footballer) (born 1979)
