= Alberto Martinez =

Alberto Martinez or Martínez may refer to:

- Alberto Martínez (footballer, born 1950) (1950–2009), Uruguayan football midfielder
- Alberto Martínez (footballer, born 1990), Argentine football midfielder
- Beto Acosta (Alberto Martín Acosta Martinez, born 1977), Uruguayan forward
- Berto (footballer) (Alberto Martínez Díaz, born 1962), Spanish football midfielder
- Alberto Martinez Piedra (1926–2021), professor of political economy
- Alberto B. Martinez, U.S. soldier acquitted of murder in the deaths of Phillip Esposito and Louis Allen
