= Roberto Martinez (disambiguation) =

Roberto Martínez (born 1973) is a Spanish football manager and former footballer.

Roberto Martinez is also the name of:

== Boxers ==
- Roberto Martínez (Honduran boxer) (born 1966), represented Honduras at the 1988 Summer Olympics
- Roberto Martínez (Uruguayan boxer), represented Uruguay at the 1960 Summer Olympics

== Footballers ==
- Roberto Martínez (footballer, born 1946), Spanish football forward
- Roberto Martínez (footballer, born 1966), Spanish football forward
- Roberto Martínez (footballer, born 1967), Peruvian football midfielder
- Roberto Martínez (footballer, born 1973), Salvadoran football defender
- Tiko (footballer), real name Roberto Martínez Rípodas, (born 1976) Spanish footballer

== Others ==
- Roberto Martínez Lacayo of the Liberal-Conservative Junta
- Roberto Martínez (sailor) world champion sailor
