= David Martínez =

David Martínez may refer to:

- David Martínez (racing driver) (born 1981), Mexican racing driver
- David Martínez (discus thrower) (born 1967), retired discus thrower from Spain
- David Martínez (baseball) (born 1987), Venezuelan professional baseball pitcher
- David Martínez (businessman) (born 1957), Mexican businessman, managing partner of Fintech Advisory
- David Martínez (fighter) (born 1998), Mexican mixed martial artist
- David Martínez (chess player) (born 1981), Spanish chess player
- David Ferreyra Martínez (born 1973), Mexican politician
- David Martínez (footballer, born 1998), Paraguayan football centre-back
- David Martínez (footballer, born 2006), Venezuelan football forward
- David Martinez, a main character in Cyberpunk: Edgerunners

== See also ==
- Dave Martinez (born 1964), American baseball manager and former outfielder
