= Pedro Martínez (disambiguation) =

Pedro Martínez (born 1971) is a Dominican baseball player who became a member of the (U.S.) Baseball Hall of Fame in 2015.

Pedro Martínez may also refer to:

== People ==
- Pedro Martínez (left-handed pitcher) (born 1968), Dominican baseball player
- Pedro Martínez (basketball) (born 1961), Spanish basketball coach
- Pedro Martínez (Argentine footballer) (1893–1931)
- Pedro Martínez (golfer) (born 1963), Paraguayan golfer
- Pedro Martínez de la Rosa (born 1971), Spanish Formula One driver
- Pedro Martínez de Luna y Pérez de Gotor (1328–1423), antipope of the Catholic Church
- Pedro Martínez (tennis) (born 1997), Spanish tennis player
- Pedro Hernández (footballer, born 1978), Spanish footballer
- Pedro Martinez (school administrator), Mexican-American CEO of Chicago Public Schools
- Pedro Martinez (wrestling), (1915-1998) wrestler and promoter for National Wrestling Federation in Buffalo and Cleveland

== Places ==
- Pedro Martínez, Granada, municipality in the province of Granada, Andalusia
