= Alberto Martínez (footballer, born 1990) =

Argentine professional footballer

Personal information
- Full name: Alberto Nicolás Martínez
- Date of birth: 13 August 1990 (age 36)
- Place of birth: Moreno, Argentina
- Height: 1.83 m (6 ft 0 in)
- Position: Midfielder

Team information
- Current team: General Lamadrid

Youth career
- Atlas
- Vélez Sarsfield
- Ferro Carril Oeste
- –2007: General Lamadrid

Senior career*
| Years | Team | Apps | (Gls) |
| 2008–2014 | General Lamadrid | 120 | (7) |
| 2013–2014 | → Deportivo Español (loan) | 56 | (4) |
| 2015–2019 | San Telmo | 86 | (20) |
| 2017 | → Unión La Calera (loan) | 13 | (0) |
| 2018–2019 | → Deportivo Riestra (loan) | 20 | (1) |
| 2020–2021 | Deportivo Riestra | 34 | (1) |
| 2021 | → Almirante Brown (loan) | 4 | (0) |
| 2022– | General Lamadrid | 60 | (5) |
| 2022 | → Deportivo Riestra (loan) | 10 | (0) |
- * Club domestic league appearances and goals as of 22 October 2024

Alberto Nicolás Martínez (born 13 August 1990) is an Argentine professional footballer who plays as a midfielder for General Lamadrid.

== Career ==
After youth stints with Atlas, Vélez Sarsfield and Ferro Carril Oeste, General Lamadrid were Martínez's first senior team. Five goals in seventy-three fixtures followed in Primera C Metropolitana across the 2008–09, 2009–10 and 2010–11 seasons, with the latter concluding with promotion to Primera B Metropolitana; though they'd be relegated after one season, as he appeared thirty-one times. In early 2013, Deportivo Español of the fourth tier completed the signing of Martínez. Four goals in fifty-seven fixtures occurred along with promotion. He had a stint back with General Lamadrid to end 2014, prior to joining San Telmo.

Martínez won his third career promotion whilst with San Telmo, all coming under the management of Jorge Franzoni. Martínez scored on his first appearance in Primera B Metropolitana for San Telmo, netting in a February 2016 victory over Acassuso. During the 2016–17 Primera B Metropolitana, Martínez scored twelve goals in the league; with braces against Acassuso, Colegiales and Villa San Carlos. On 30 June 2017, Martínez agreed a loan move to Primera B de Chile side Unión La Calera. He participated in eighteen matches in all competitions in the 2017 season, as the club won promotion via the play-offs.

In January 2018, Martínez was loaned to Deportivo Riestra for the rest of 2017–18 in Primera B Nacional and all of 2018–19 in Primera B Metropolitana. In February 2021, Martínez moved Almirante Brown until the end of the year. He then re-joined his former club General Lamadrid ahead of the 2022, before returning to Deportivo Riestra in June 2022.

After playing for Almirante Brown, Martínez returned to General Lamadrid. In 2022, he had another stint with Deportivo Riestra, returning to General Lamadrid in 2023.

== Career statistics ==
As of 4 June 2019.

Appearances and goals by club, season and competition
| Club | Season | League | | | Cup | | League Cup | | Continental | | Other | | Total | |
| Club | Season | Division | Apps | Goals | Apps | Goals | Apps | Goals | Apps | Goals | Apps | Goals | Apps | Goals |
|---|---|---|---|---|---|---|---|---|---|---|---|---|---|---|
| General Lamadrid | 2008–09 | Primera C Metropolitana | 13 | 0 | 0 | 0 | — | | — | | 0 | 0 | 13 | 0 |
| General Lamadrid | 2009–10 | Primera C Metropolitana | 24 | 1 | 0 | 0 | — | | — | | 0 | 0 | 24 | 1 |
| General Lamadrid | 2010–11 | Primera C Metropolitana | 36 | 4 | 0 | 0 | — | | — | | 0 | 0 | 36 | 4 |
| General Lamadrid | 2011–12 | Primera B Metropolitana | 31 | 0 | 0 | 0 | — | | — | | 0 | 0 | 31 | 0 |
| General Lamadrid | Total | | 104 | 5 | 0 | 0 | — | | — | | 0 | 0 | 104 | 5 |
| Deportivo Español | 2012–13 | Primera C Metropolitana | 15 | 1 | 0 | 0 | — | | — | | 0 | 0 | 15 | 1 |
| Deportivo Español | 2013–14 | Primera C Metropolitana | 41 | 3 | 1 | 0 | — | | — | | 0 | 0 | 42 | 3 |
| Deportivo Español | Total | | 56 | 4 | 1 | 0 | — | | — | | 0 | 0 | 57 | 4 |
| General Lamadrid | 2014 | Primera C Metropolitana | 16 | 2 | 0 | 0 | — | | — | | 0 | 0 | 16 | 2 |
| San Telmo | 2015 | Primera C Metropolitana | 32 | 4 | 0 | 0 | — | | — | | 0 | 0 | 32 | 4 |
| San Telmo | 2016 | Primera B Metropolitana | 18 | 4 | 1 | 0 | — | | — | | 0 | 0 | 19 | 4 |
| San Telmo | 2016–17 | Primera B Metropolitana | 36 | 12 | 0 | 0 | — | | — | | 0 | 0 | 36 | 12 |
| San Telmo | 2017–18 | Primera B Metropolitana | 0 | 0 | 0 | 0 | — | | — | | 0 | 0 | 0 | 0 |
| San Telmo | 2018–19 | Primera B Metropolitana | 0 | 0 | 0 | 0 | — | | — | | 0 | 0 | 0 | 0 |
| San Telmo | Total | | 86 | 20 | 1 | 0 | — | | — | | 0 | 0 | 87 | 20 |
| Unión La Calera (loan) | 2017 | Primera B | 13 | 0 | 1 | 0 | — | | — | | 4 (Note: Appearance(s) in the Primera B play-offs) | 0 | 18 | 0 |
| Deportivo Riestra (loan) | 2017–18 | Primera B Nacional | 4 | 0 | 0 | 0 | — | | — | | 0 | 0 | 4 | 0 |
| Deportivo Riestra (loan) | 2018–19 | Primera B Metropolitana | 16 | 1 | 0 | 0 | — | | — | | 0 | 0 | 16 | 1 |
| Deportivo Riestra (loan) | Total | | 20 | 1 | 0 | 0 | — | | — | | 0 | 0 | 20 | 1 |
| Career total | | | 295 | 32 | 3 | 0 | — | | — | | 4 | 0 | 302 | 32 |

== Honours ==
General Lamadrid

- Primera C Metropolitana: 2010–11

San Telmo

- Primera C Metropolitana: 2015

Unión La Calera

- Primera B: 2017
