= Michael Martinez (Tolkien scholar) =

Michael Martinez is an author and Tolkien scholar.

== Life ==
Michael Martinez was born in 1959. He is a Tolkien scholar. In 1997 he launched the Xenite.Org website for fans of fantasy and science fiction; he has published many essays on that website. He also writes about programming languages and search engine optimization.

== Tolkien scholar ==
The Tolkien scholar Colin Duriez states that Martinez has written about many aspects of Tolkien's writings, and has "a loyal following of readers" on the World Wide Web.

David Bratman writes in Tolkien Studies that Understanding Middle-earth is a "somewhat rewritten... collection of Web-published essays by a popular online writer on Tolkien." Bratman describes Martinez's subjects as including discussions of Tolkien's sources, "whimsical speculations and outright guesswork", noting that Martinez does use materials published by Christopher Tolkien after his father's death, and that his facts are "generally reliable". Bratman writes that Martinez's "most characteristic posture is a forceful intervention in debates over the sub-creation, especially in testing the limits of reliable sub-creational knowledge." He describes Martinez as writing "informally and argumentatively but (in small doses) readably... without pretensions to formal scholarship."

Robin Anne Reid, in Journal of Tolkien Research, notes Martinez's statement in his essay "What is the Munby Letter?" that Tolkien affirmed in that unpublished letter that there were "Orc-women". Reid adds that this agrees with Tolkien's mentions of "half-breed Orcs" and that they could reproduce. Further, she cites Martinez's essay "Why is Azog Called the White Orc?" for his statement that the specially large type of Orcs, the Uruk-hai, are explicitly "described as having dark skin", implying that "while there is no canon support for white Orcs specifically", other Orcs may have been white.

Thomas Honegger, also in Journal of Tolkien Research, writes that a single word can often be crucial in Tolkien scholarship. In the context of a discussion of whether Tolkien was envisaging late-medieval knightly chivalry, he quotes Martinez's essay "Was Imrahil's Vambrace Made of Metal?", noting that the key point is Martinez's statement that calling the forearm armour metal "is merely a product of wishful thinking" by people with an image of medieval knights in "full plate armor". Honegger sums up Martinez's argument as stating that "even a burnished leather vambrace would work for Imrahil's first-aid check on Éowyn."

Gregers Einer Forssling quotes Martinez's defence of Tolkien from the charge of Nordicism, the racist ideology of Nordic supremacy. He notes that Martinez quotes Tolkien's own rejection of "this Nordic nonsense", and that Martinez mentions Tolkien's regret that "the term Nordic had become associated with 'racialist theories'", thus rebutting Stephen Shapiro's assertion that "themes of cultural and biological Nordicism can be recognised in The Lord of the Rings".

== Works ==
- 1996: Parma Endorion: Essays on Middle-earth, illustrated by Anke Eißmann (free e-book; 3rd edition, 2001).
- 2000: Visualizing Middle-earth, Xlibris. ISBN 978-073887254-4
- 2003: Understanding Middle-earth: Essays on Tolkien's Middle-earth, Visisphere. ISBN 978-158776145-4
- 2014: Mindfaring through Middle-earth, Xenite.Org (e-book).
