= Miguel Ángel Martínez-González =

Spanish physician

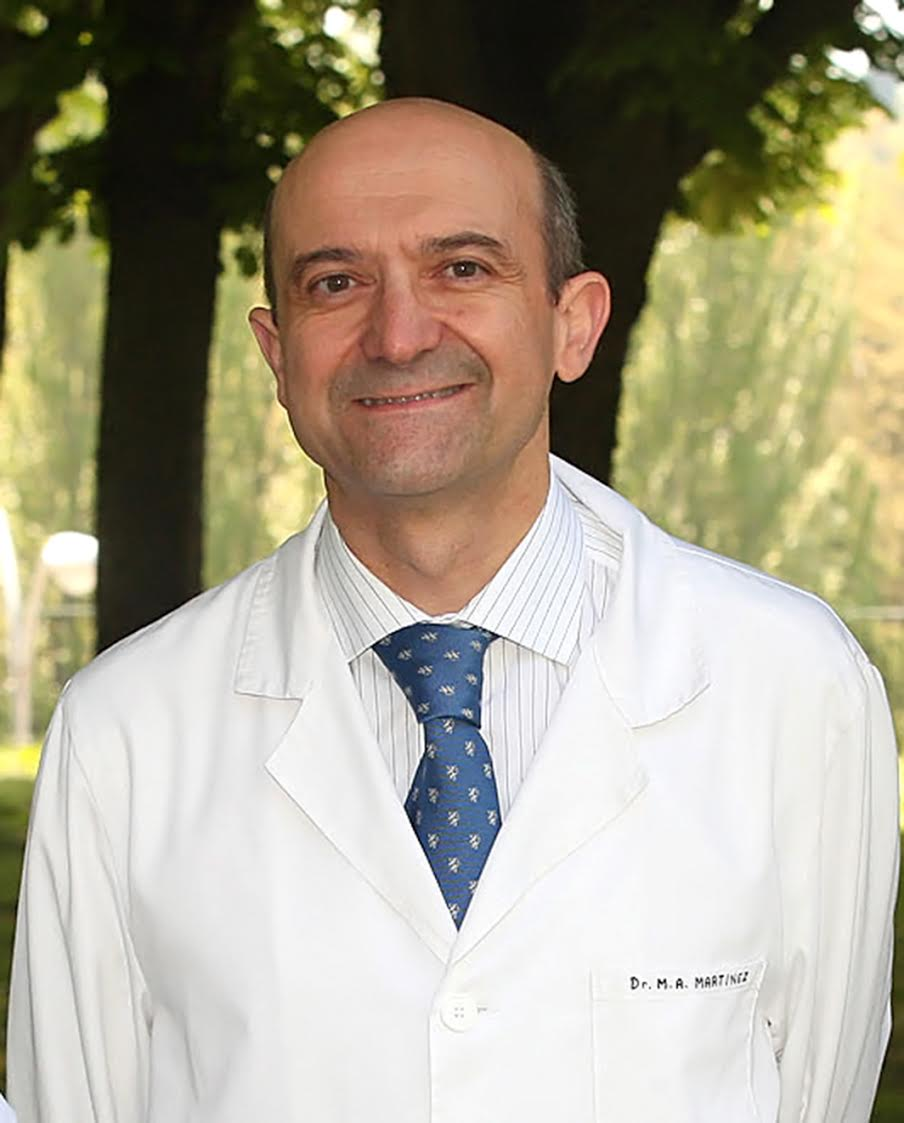
- Born: Miguel Ángel Martínez-González; 11 September 1957; Málaga, Spain
- Education: University of Granada
- Known for: Mediterranean diet
- Awards: Grace Goldsmith Award; Best investigator in Nutrition in Spain
- Scientific career
- Fields: Epidemiology
- Doctoral advisor: Miguel Delgado-Rodríguez; Aurora Bueno

Miguel Ángel Martínez-González (born in 1957 in Málaga, Spain) is a Spanish medical doctor, epidemiologist, professor, and nutrition researcher He has been often a visiting scholar at Harvard T.H. Chan School of Public Health (Dept. Nutrition).

Martínez-González was the Founder and Chair (until September 2022) of the Department of Preventive Medicine and Public Health at University of Navarra at the Medical School. He was also the Principal Investigator of an Advanced Research Grant of the European Research Council for funding the PREDIMED-Plus trial.

Martínez-González has been also the Founder and 'Principal Investigator' (until June 2022) of the SUN cohort study, and he was (2006-2013) the Coordinator of the several centers included in the PREDIMED Network (a large clinical trial assessing the effects of a Mediterranean diet on the primary prevention of Cardiovascular disease. He is one of the best known worldwide experts in the Mediterranean diet and has comprehensively studied the nutritional determinants of obesity in the Spanish population. His self-help book in Spanish “Salud a ciencia cierta” (Planeta, 2018) provides useful tools to improve healthy habits and food choices.

He was awarded with the Grace Goldsmith Award (American College of Nutrition, 2013 and the Rankin-Skatrud lecture (Univ. of Wisconsin, 2016).

In September 2016 he was appointed Adjunct Professor at the Department of Nutrition of Harvard TH Chan School of Public Health. He is the co-PI together with Frank B. Hu of two on-going grants funded by the US National Institutes of Health (NIH).

In 2022 he received the prestigious National Scientific Research Award "Gregorio Marañón" in Medicine and Health Sciences by the Ministry of Science and Innovation of the Spanish Government. In 2024, he was named Doctor Honoris Causa by the University of Almería (Spain).
