= Hengst Automotive =

German automotive company

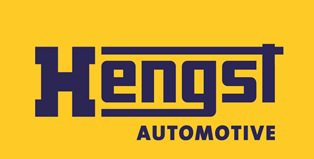
- Type: SE & Co. KG
- Industry: Automotive
- Founded: 1958
- Headquarters: Münster, North Rhine-Westphalia, Deutschland
- Products: Filter systems and engine components for the automotive industry as well as filters for industrial and environmental technology appliance
- Revenue: 400 Mio € (2014)
- Number of employees: 3,000 (2014)
- Website: www.hengst.com

Hengst Automotive, based in Münster, North Rhine-Westphalia, Germany, is a company that specializes in fluid management, crankcase ventilation systems as well as filter systems for oil, fuel, air and cabin air filtration.

The company is a development partner and series supplier for the automotive and engine industry, as well as operating in the industrial and consumer goods markets. In the industrial and environmental technology sectors, Hengst Automotive also develops customized services for almost all filtration applications, employing 3,000 people worldwide in eleven locations in Germany, Brazil, China, India, Poland, Singapore and the US. Founded in 1958 by engineer Walter Hengst, the company is to this day an independent third-generation family enterprise with its headquarters in Münster.

== History/milestones ==
In 1958, Walter Hengst founded the company Ing. Walter Hengst KG in Münster. In 1977, Günter Röttgering, the son-in-law of Walter Hengst, joined the company, later becoming his successor, as a result of which the company was rebranded as Ing. Walter Hengst GmbH & Co. KG. Following the introduction of the first service-friendly cup oil filters with automatic drain system and plastic screw cap in 1988, the filter plant Hengst Filterwerke Berlin GmbH & Co. KG was founded in Berlin in 1990. In 1992, Walter Hengst’s daughter, Wera Röttgering, founded the national registered association Herzenswünsche e. V. (Heart’s Desires). In 1993, Hengst launched the environmentally-friendly ENGERGETIC® filter system, which was the first metal-free filter insert. In 1995, the first cup oil filter with an integrated centrifuge was introduced, followed by the first fluid management module in 1996. In 1997, a highly efficient oil mist separator system (cyclones for Otto and diesel engines) was introduced.

In 1998, a third of the Hengst Filterwerke plant was destroyed by the largest fire in Münster since World War II. In 1999, Hengst founded a joint venture in Joinville, Brazil, under the corporate name Hengst-Wetzel Ltda. In 2000, the Nordwalde site, which has its own aluminum foundry, was founded and constructed. In the same year, Hengst acquired the Champ and Luber-finer trademarks from Luber-finer GmbH.

In 2002, Business Studies graduate Jens Röttgering started working for the family business, which is now in its third generation. In 2003, the company opened engineering offices in São Paulo, Brazil, and Detroit, US. This was followed by the founding of the subsidiary company, Indústria de Filtros Ltda., in São Paulo, Brazil (formerly Hengst-Wetzel Ltda.). In the same year, Hengst introduced a cylinder head cover with integrated oil separator and pressure regulation. In 2004, Hengst also discontinued distribution of the Champ and Luber-finer brands and has since focused on the Hengst Filter brand.

In 2005, Hengst founded the subsidiary companies Hengst of North America, Inc. in Camden, US, and Hengst Filter Systems (Kunshan) Co., Ltd. in Kunshan, China. Around the same time, Hengst developed a multifunctional module with an integrated coolant pump. In 2008, the company launched a high-speed centrifuge for all performance classes on the market. Furthermore, the company opened its own day-care facility, Hengst Kinderland (Hengst Children’s Land) in 2008. In 2010, Hengst developed the Blue-Engine-Care System (BECS) modular system for engine optimization. This range spawned the Blue.tron, an electrical disk separator, in 2011, and in 2013, the fuel care system, Blue.maxx, was also launched. Hengst opened an engineering office in Bangalore, India in early 2013 in order to expand its worldwide presence. In 2014 the site in Singapore was founded. The site in Poland followed in May 2015.

== Products ==
Air filter systems

- Cabin air filters, air filters, air filter systems, components
- Crankcase ventilation systems and components

Liquid filter systems

- Fluid management modules
- Oil filter and oil filter systems
- Fuel filters and fuel filter systems
- Oil centrifuges

Engine components

- Cylinder head covers
- Intake mufflers
- Technical plastic parts for the engine bay

Filter elements for the independent replacement part industry

- Filter elements for air and liquids (oil, fuel, water)
- Cabin air filters
- Coolant filters
- Oil and fuel changeover filters
- Filter elements for oil mist separators
- Brake air dryers
- Urea filters
- Water filters
- Service parts
- Gauze filters
- Manual feed pumps
- Centrifuges

Industrial filters

- Lubcation engine oil
- Filters for dedusting and erosion technology
- Filters for cleaning devices
- Filters for electric tools
- Filters for special application

Blue Engine Care Systems Modular system for engine optimization

- Blue.jet (oil care system)
- Blue.maxx (fuel care system)
- Blue.care (coolant care system)
- Blue.tron (oil mist separator system)

== Locations ==
3,000 employees worldwide work in eleven locations in Germany (Münster, Nordwalde, Berlin), the US (Novi (MI), Camden (SC)), Brazil (Joinville (SC), São Paulo), China (Kunshan), India (Bangalore), Singapore (Singapore) and Poland (Gostyń).

=== Germany ===
Hengst SE & Co. KG was founded in 1958 in Münster. In 1990, the VEB filter and carburetor plant in Berlin was acquired under the Hengst Filterwerke Berlin GmbH & Co.KG brand. The production site in Nordwalde, with the construction of its own aluminum foundry and logistics center, was founded in 2000.

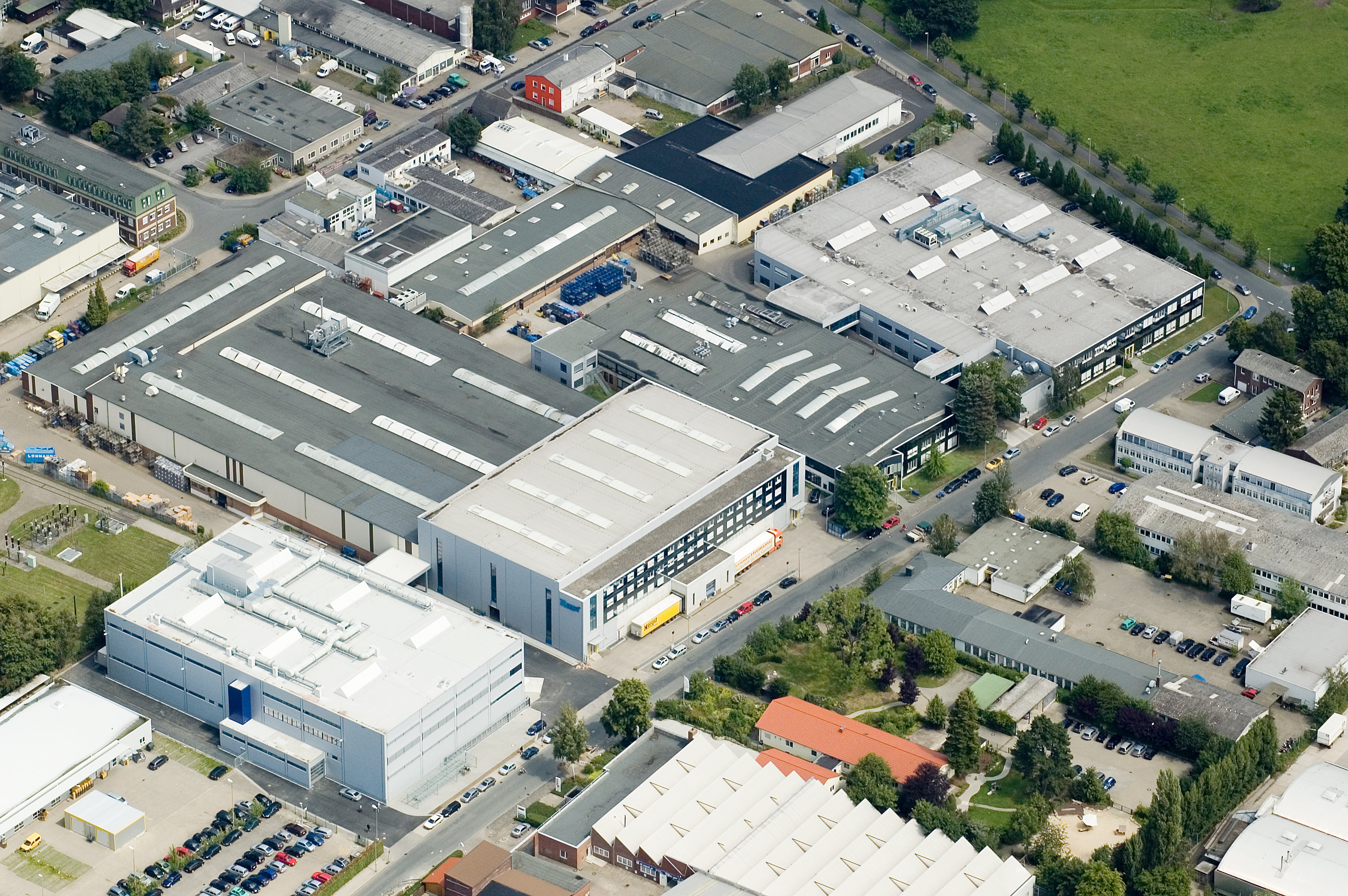
Aerial view of the Münster site, North Rhine-Westphalia

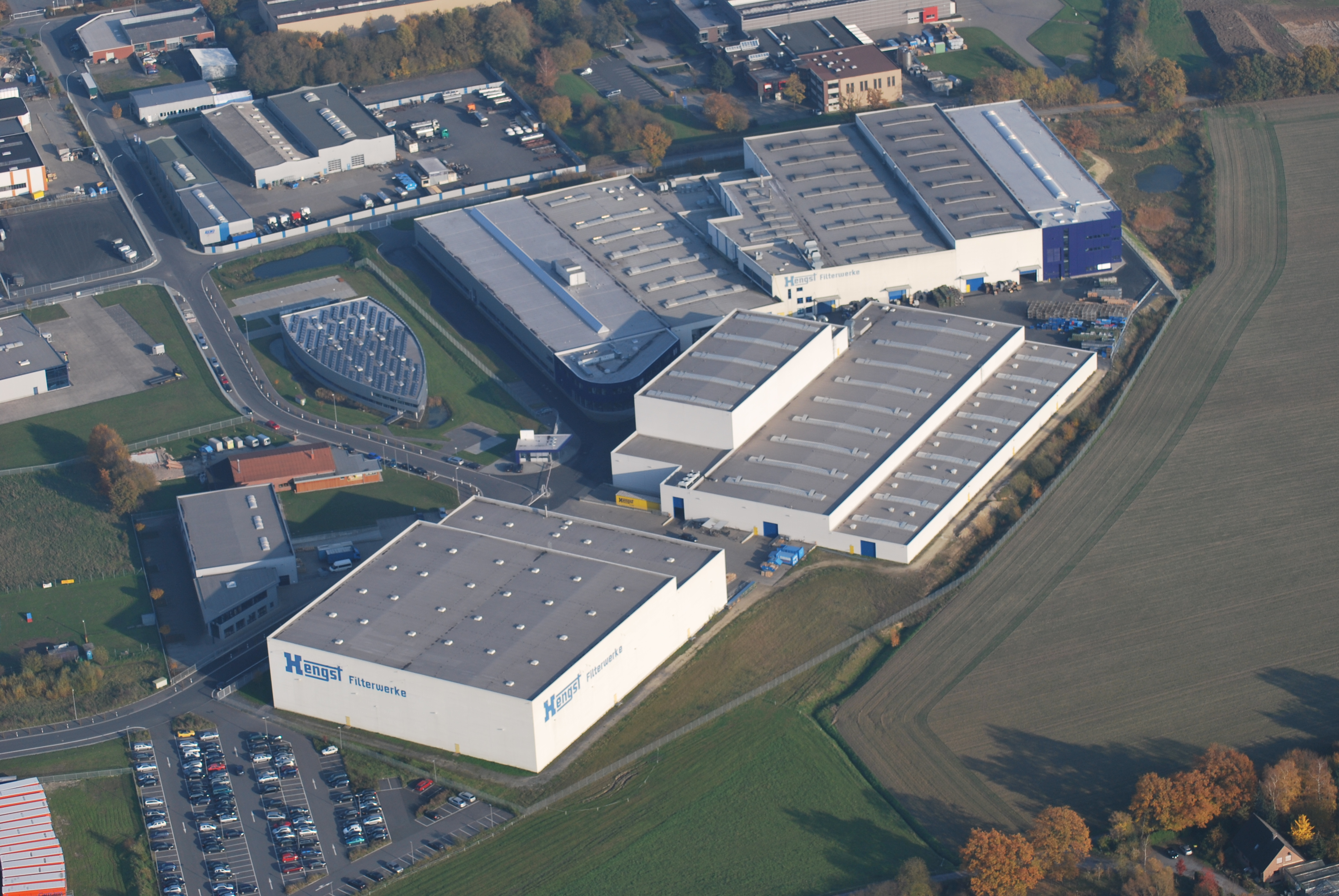
Aerial view of the Nordwalde site, North Rhine-Westphalia

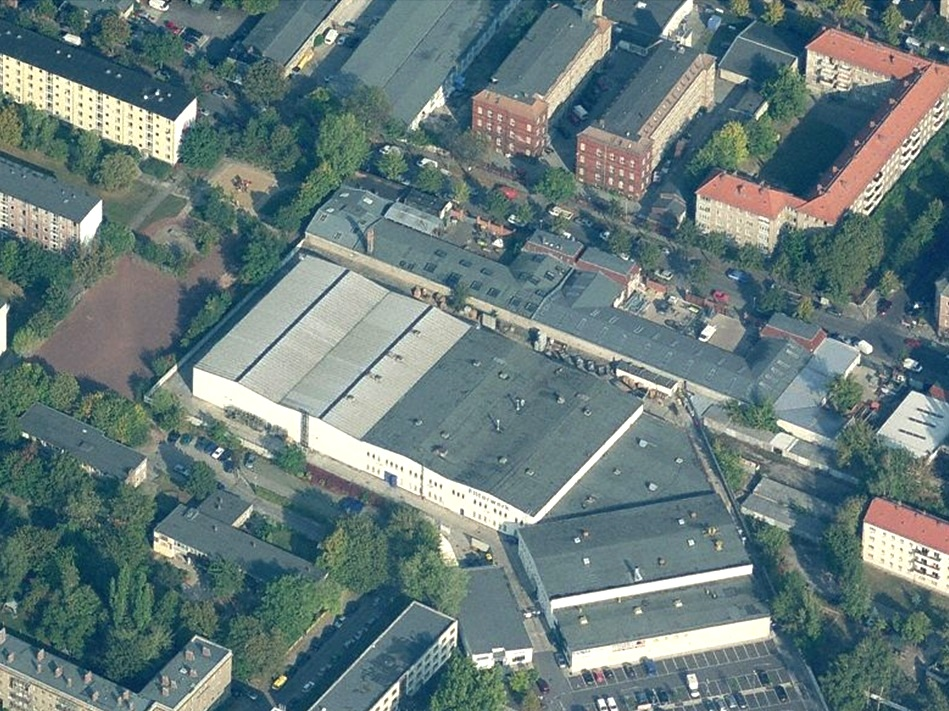
Aerial view of the Berlin site

=== Brazil ===
In 1999, a joint venture known as Hengst-Wetzel Ltda. In Joinville (SC) was established. This was followed by an application engineering office in São Paulo. In 2004, all Hengst-Wetzel Ltda. joint venture shares were acquired from the Brazilian partner and the company was renamed Hengst Indústria de Filtros Ltda.

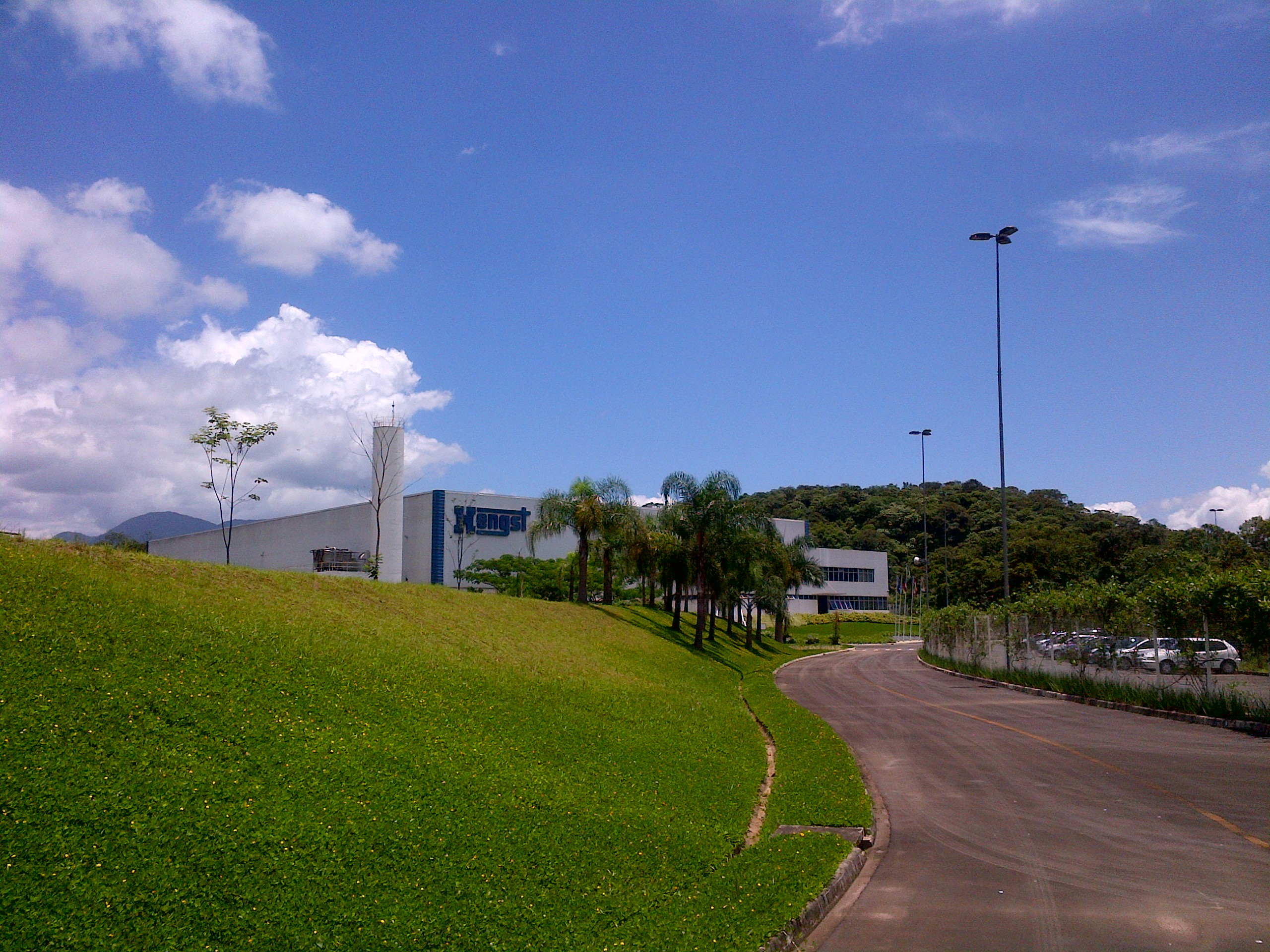
Site in Joinville (SC), Brazil

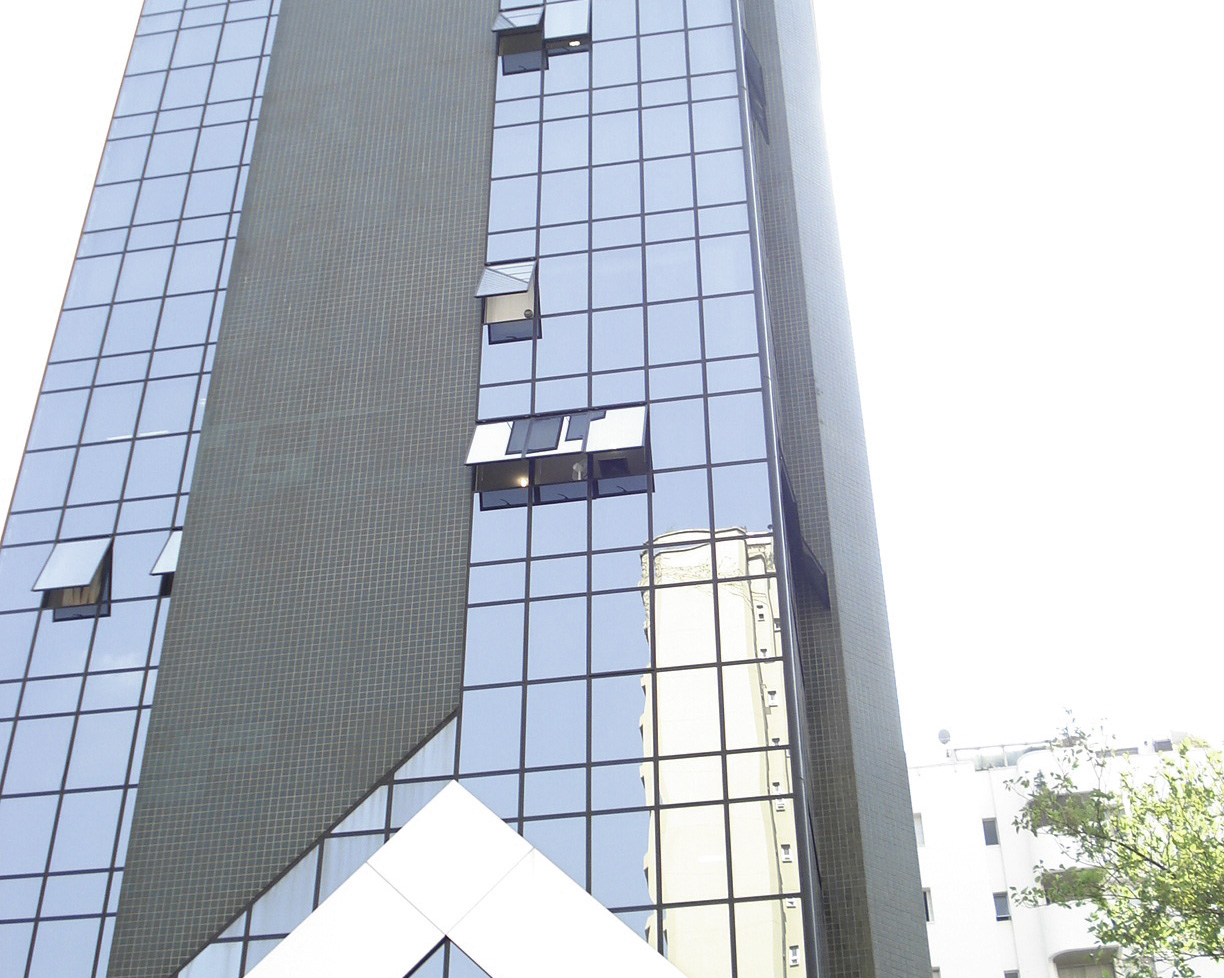
Site in São Paulo, Brazil

=== United States ===
An application engineering office in Detroit (MI) opened in 2003, which was followed by the founding of the subsidiary company, Hengst of North America, Inc. Camden (SC), in the US in 2005. 2013, the application engineering office moved into the new Tech Center in Novi (MI).

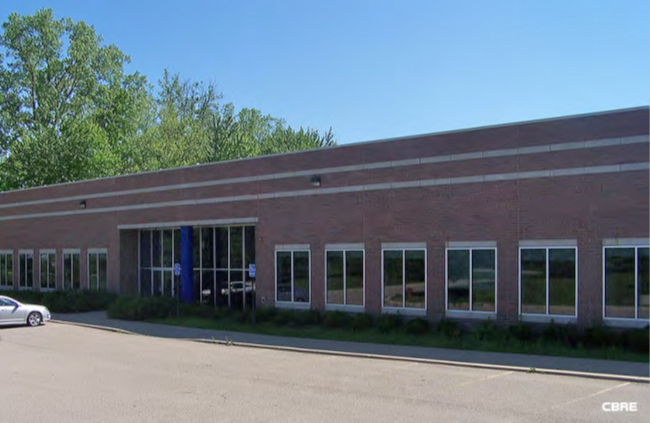
Site Detroit in Novi (MI), US

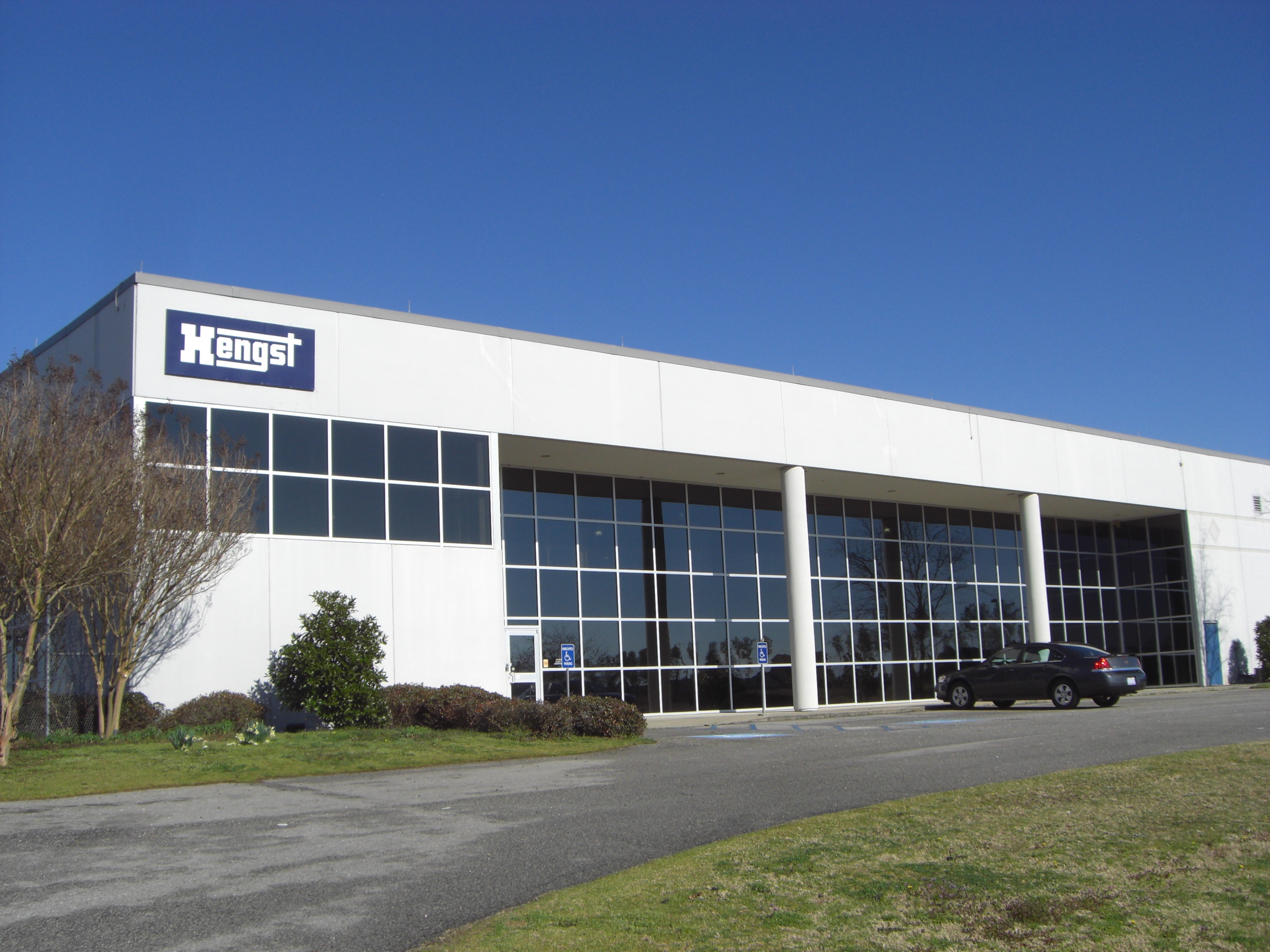
Site in Camden (SC), US

=== China ===
In 2005, the subsidiary company, Hengst Filter Systems (Kunshan) Co., Ltd., which was the first in Asia, was founded.

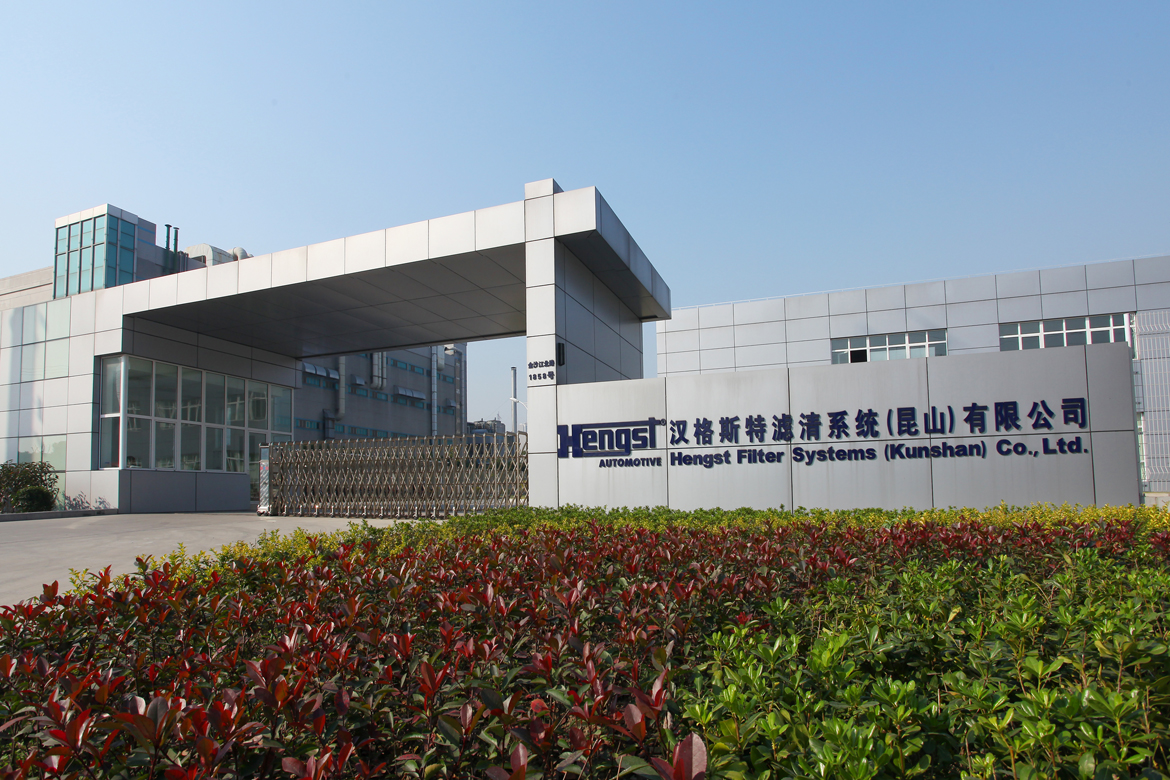
Site in Kunshan, China

=== India ===
The site in Bangalore was founded in 2013.

=== Singapore ===
The site in Singapore was founded in 2014.

=== Poland ===
The site in Poland was founded in 2015.
