= Andrés Martínez =

Andrés Martínez may refer to:

- Andrés Martínez Trueba (1884–1959), president of Uruguay, 1951–1955
- Andrés Ciro Martínez (born 1968), Argentine singer and musician
- Andrés Martínez (athlete) (1978–2015), Paralympic athlete from Spain
- Andrés Martínez (footballer) (born 1972), former Uruguayan football player
- Andrés Martinez (athlete) (born 1954), Spanish sprinter
- Andrés Martínez (gymnast), Spanish gymnast
- Andrés Martinez (editor) (born 1966), Mexican-born American journalist, formerly at the Los Angeles Times
- Andrés Martínez (weightlifter) (born 1944), Cuban Olympic weightlifter
