= Ibn Mardanish =

Ibn Mardanish may refer to

- Abu ʿAbd Allāh Muḥammad ibn Saʿd ibn Mardanīsh (died 1172), ruler of Murcia
- Zayyan ibn Mardanish (died 1270), ruler of Valencia
