= Isabel Martinez (artist) =

Mexican and American artist (born 1958)

Isabel Martinez (born 1958) is a Mexican and American visual artist, known for her work in mixed media, including painting, drawing, printmaking, and multicultural arts and crafts. Her artwork explores themes of immigration, identity, and indigeneity, reflecting both her personal experiences and cultural heritage. Martinez's work has been included in several magazines, books, and catalogs, and she has had both solo and group exhibitions throughout the world.

== Early life and education ==
Martinez was born in 1958, in Alpoyeca in Guerrero, Mexico. She immigrated to the United States in the 1980's for better opportunities.

In 1986, she attended Los Angeles City College to study English and enroll in art courses. She received a Bachelor of Fine Arts degree from the La Escuela Nacional de Artes Plasticas in Mexico City; and both a Masters in Fine Arts degree and a single subject art credential from California State University, Los Angeles (Cal State LA), which allowed her to teach art at an elementary level.

== Notable work ==
Martinez’s work is deeply influenced by her experiences as an immigrant and her indigenous heritage. Her art was described as "dark and obscure," reflecting the struggles of adjusting to a new country. She adopted brighter, more colorful components into her style as she blended in with American society, signifying adaptability and resiliency. Her artwork celebrates her Mexican heritage while addressing more general socioeconomic issues by displaying indigenous traditions through vivid colors and ethnic components. Many of her works explore themes of immigration, cultural identity, and the Day of the Dead.

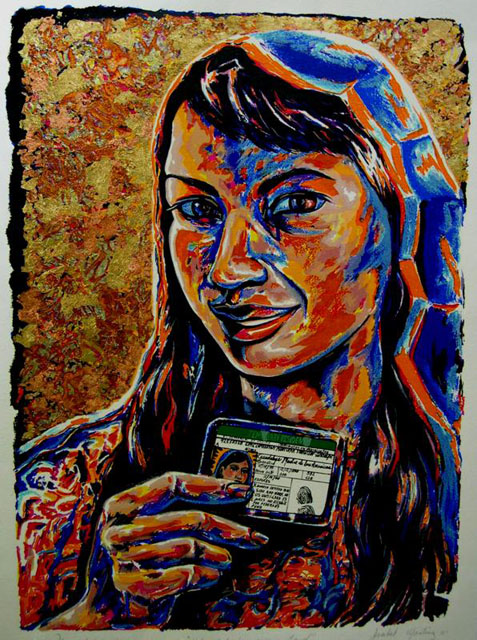
VG Got her Green Card, 2001, by Isabel Martinez

Isabel Martinez created several mixed-media series, ceramics, paintings, and other forms of art which includes VG Got her Green Card, 2001.

Exhibitions include the following at Avenue 50 Studios in Los Angeles:

Living Jewels, Jan 22 - Feb 26, 2022

- This is a solo exhibition consisting of 25 paintings of insects such as: hummingbirds, beetles, butterflies, dragonflies, and more. The series was inspired by her childhood memories in the ranch life in Mexico, serving as a reminder of the importance of respecting and appreciating the environment; Martinez wants the viewers to consider the chaos that could come forth with the disappearance of these 'living jewels'.

Coming Out of the Dark, Jan 22 - Feb 26, 2022

- This is a group exhibition consisting of twelve artists, including herself, which reflects on the effects of the COVID-19 pandemic for the past two years, 2020–2022. Considering the shutdown amidst of the pandemic, artists, such as Martinez, partook in creating pieces embarking the turbulent and unprecedented times of it. The exhibition allowed said artists to challenge their creative spirit, serving as a transition to a new era, an awakening, and "coming out of the dark" times presented. She was a student of the curator artist of the exhibition, Raoul De la Sota in 1986.
