= Miguel Martínez de Pinillos Sáenz =

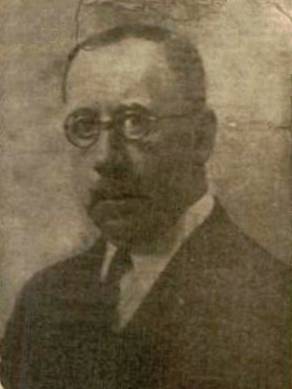
- Born: Miguel Martínez de Pinillos Sáenz; 1875; Cádiz, Spain
- Died: 1953 (aged 77–78); Cádiz, Spain
- Occupation: entrepreneur
- Known for: ship-owner
- Political party: Union Patriotica, CT

Miguel Martínez de Pinillos Sáenz (1875–1953) (Note: Neither the date of his birth nor the date of his death is clear. One author claims he was born "around 1881", another one gives a precise date of November 15, 1875 The death dates are given as 1953 or 1954.) was a Spanish entrepreneur. He is known mostly as a ship-owner, who operated a Cádiz-based fleet of merchant vessels on Mediterranean and Atlantic routes. He is recognized also as a locally known conservative politician, briefly serving in the Cortes as a Carlist deputy.

== Family and youth ==
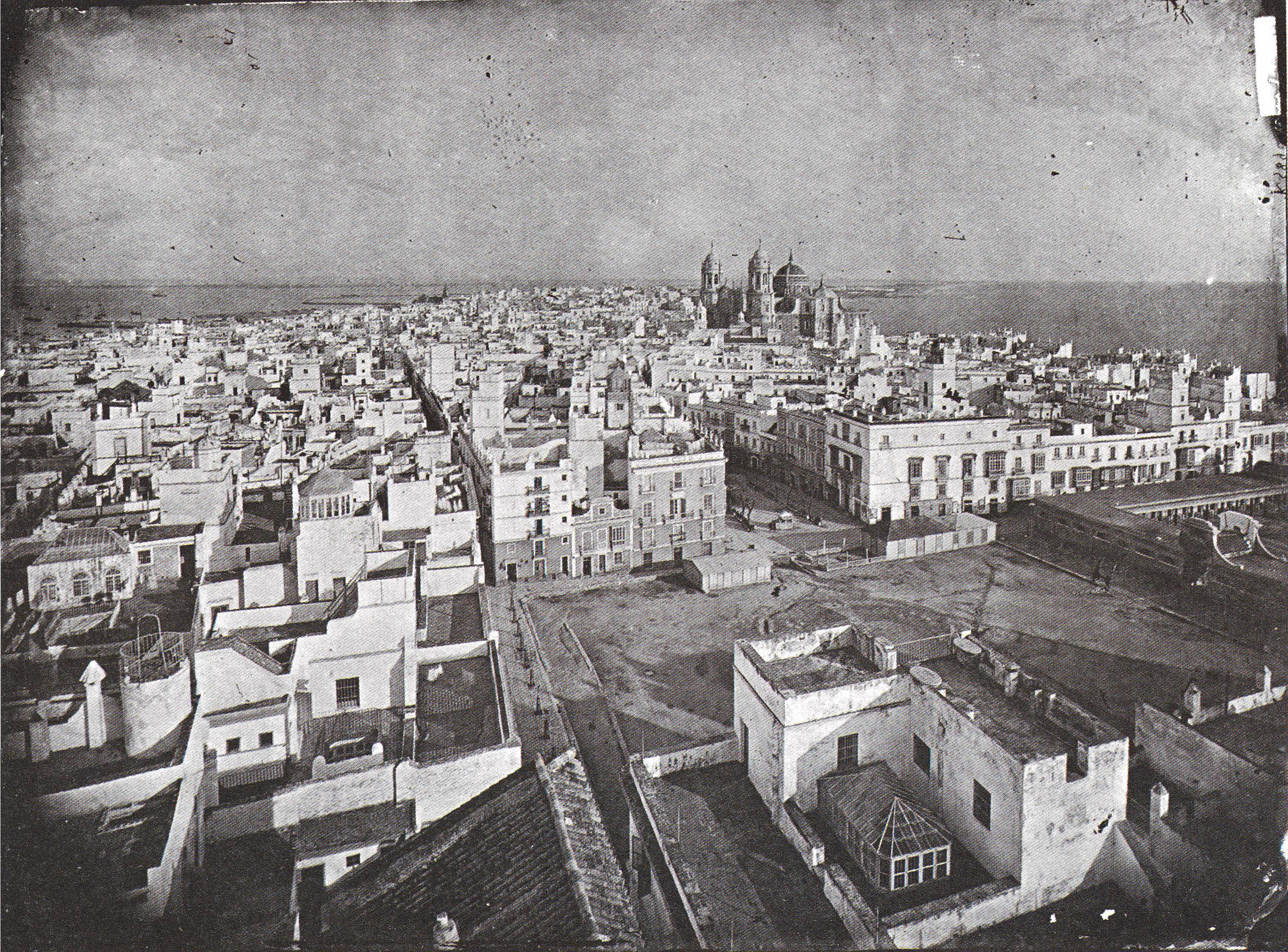
Cádiz, 1880s

The Pinillos originated from La Rioja and were first noted in the 16th century; one of its representatives, Martín, got his first name incorporated into the family surname. Many of their members served either in the Spanish administration or in the military; because of their overseas duties, the family became very branched with some of its descendants noted in history of various Latin American countries, notably Cuba and Bolivia. Miguel's great-grandfather, Antonio Martínez de Pinillos Marín, was the last one who lived in La Rioja. His son and Miguel's grandfather, Miguel Martínez de Pinillos y Sáenz de Velasco, though born in Nieva de Cameros moved to the South and settled in Cádiz. In the 1830s he engaged in maritime business as owner of a ship serving the Spanish West Indies; in the 1840 his business grew to a fleet of vessels.

In the 1880s the enterprise was taken over by Miguel's son and also Miguel's father, Antonio María Martínez de Pinillos Izquierdo (1843–1926); under his management the enterprise reached its golden age. Antonio modernized the fleet by switching to steamers and operated new regular routes both on the Atlantic and on the Mediterranean, opening a base in Santander and trying to serve also Northern Europe and the Far East. His company, first named Pinillos, Sáenz y Cia. and since the 1890s Pinillos, Izquierdo y Cia., together with its major competitor Trasatlántica became key player on the Spanish transatlantic routes. Serving as councillor in ayuntamiento and with members of other Martínez de Pinillo branches acting as top local officials, Antonio became the provincial business mogul; the family grew among the most prominent ones in Cádiz.

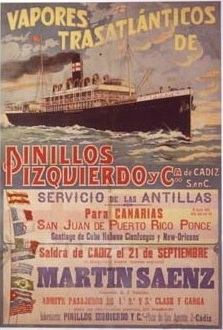
Pinillos 1906 poster

As the Martínez de Pinillos and the Izquierdo families used to intermarry, also Antonio married Aquilina Sáenz y Izquierdo. It is not clear how many children the couple had, though Miguel was the only son. None of the sources consulted provides information on his early schooling; he intended to join the navy, but in his teens he was sent to England to receive commercial education in London. He remained in Britain until his adult years and returned to Cádiz in the early 1890s. In 1900 he married Trinidad Toro y Gómez. Living in the family residence at Plaza de Mina, the couple had two children: Antonio and Carmen Martínez de Pinillos y Toro, both born prior to 1919. Antonio was supposed to take over the family business until he died in a car accident in 1951. It was his daughter and Miguel's granddaughter, María Carmen Martínez de Pinillos Ceballos, who went on running the company as Naviera Pinillos. The enterprise remained in family hands until the early 1990s; at that time it was taken over by Grupo Boluda, which keeps maintaining the brand.

== Ship-owner ==
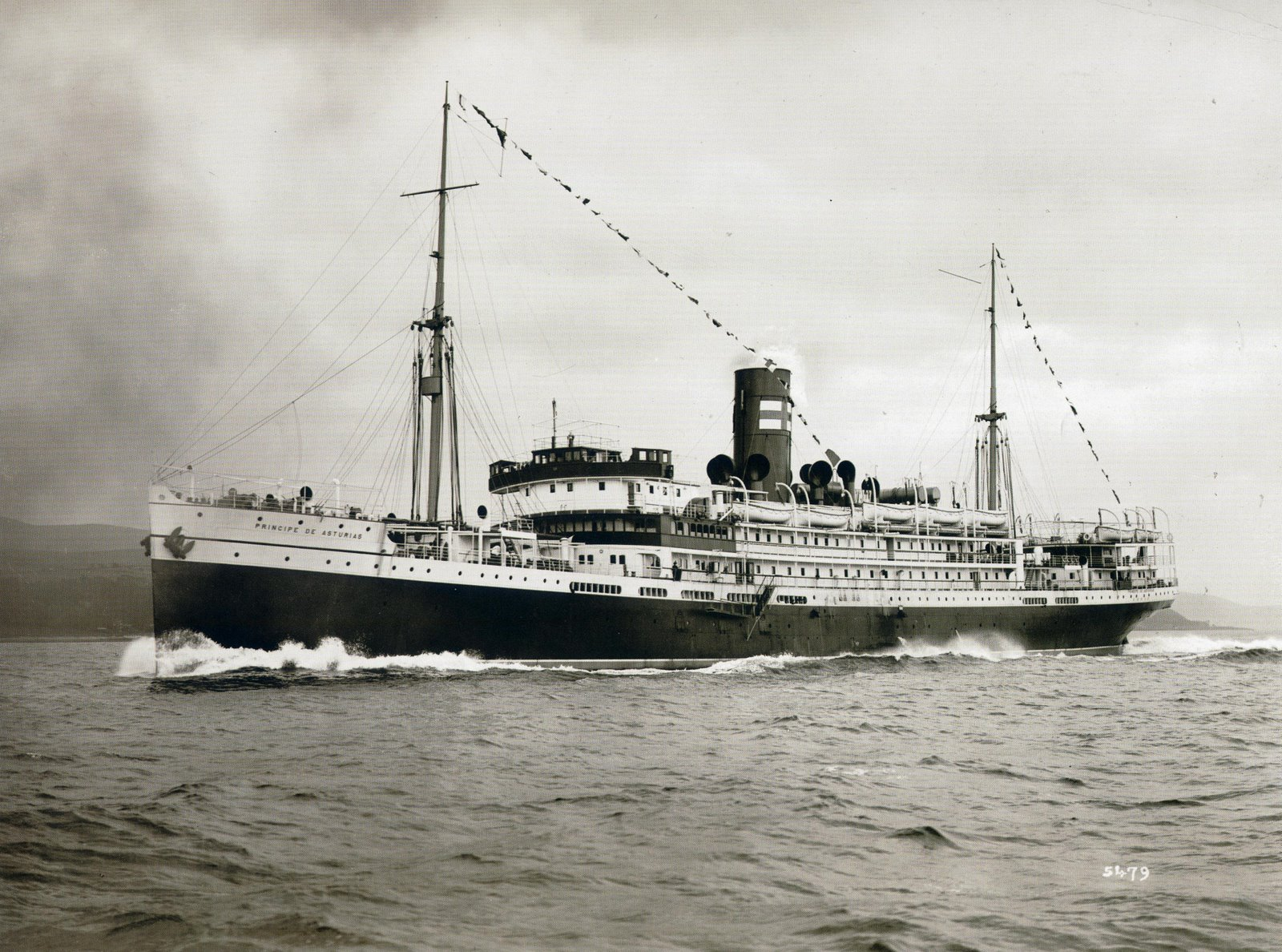
Príncipe de Asturias

Upon completing his education in England Martínez de Pinillos returned to Spain and engaged in the family business run by his father; it is not clear what roles he performed in Pinillos, Izquierdo y Cia. At that time the family enterprise was at its peak, but in the years to come it went into gradual decline. Spain's loss of overseas holdings dramatically reduced demand for transatlantic communication in the 1900s, a series of massively tragic naval disasters shattered the company image when Príncipe de Asturias and Valbanera sank in the 1910s and the post-war crisis hit the company hard in the early 1920s; as a result, Pinillos, Izquierdo y Cia shut down in 1921, selling its assets to Compañia Transoceanica de Navegación.

In 1923 Miguel Martínez de Pinillos decided to re-launch the business, this time setting up his own company named Lineas Pinillos. He did not resume grand oceanic activities and switched to a less ambitious, but pragmatic format. Lineas Pinillos engaged in tramping and coasting trade, the latter both as cabotage and grand cabotage. In terms of geography the company focused on the Canary Islands. In terms of cargo type, it specialized in fruits – mostly bananas - and coal. Until the late 1920s its most typical operations were exports of fruits from the Canary Islands to Britain and return cruises to Spanish ports with the load of British coal. The vessels operated also on other routes along the Atlantic Northern African coast and across the Mediterranean, calling at Moroccan, French or Italian ports.

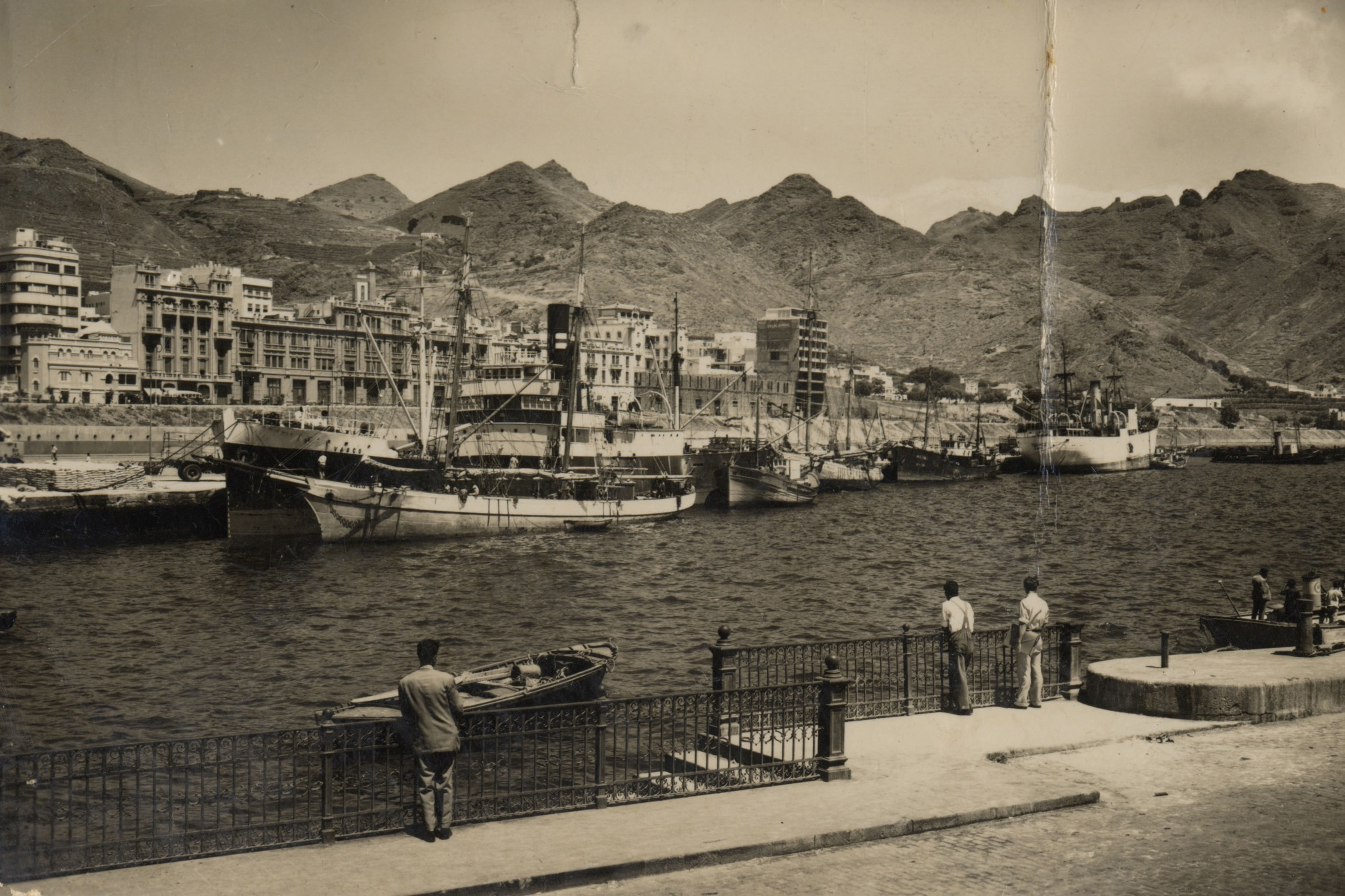
Vasco in Santa Cruz de Tenerife

Martínez de Pinillos was gradually assembling a fleet of merchant vessels. His default strategy relied on purchasing new ships from Spanish and foreign shipyards, mostly in the Vascongadas (Ardanaz from Baracaldo and Euskalduna from Bilbao) and in Scotland (Robert Duncan & Co in Glasgow and Caledon in Dundee), though occasionally coming from other manufacturers like the Norwegian Verksted Kristiansand. To suit his tramping and cabotage pattern of service he focused on small to mid-size vessels; while in the early 1900s an average cargo ship size was 4,000 DWT, most vessels which joined Lineas Pinillos were around 2,000 DWT. Though initially Martínez de Pinillos purchased late-generation steamers powered by triple expansion type engines with some 900 hp, since the mid-1920s he switched to modern diesel propulsion, offering around 1,700 hp. By 1925 the fleet consisted of 4 ships: Rio Arillo, Duero, Celta and Vasco; in the late 1920s and the early 1930s it was joined by 4 sister vessels built in Bilbao: Ebro, Sil, Turia and Darro; designed as reefer ships, they already reflected the new company strategy to focus entirely on transport of fruits and other similar cargo.

== Other business activities ==
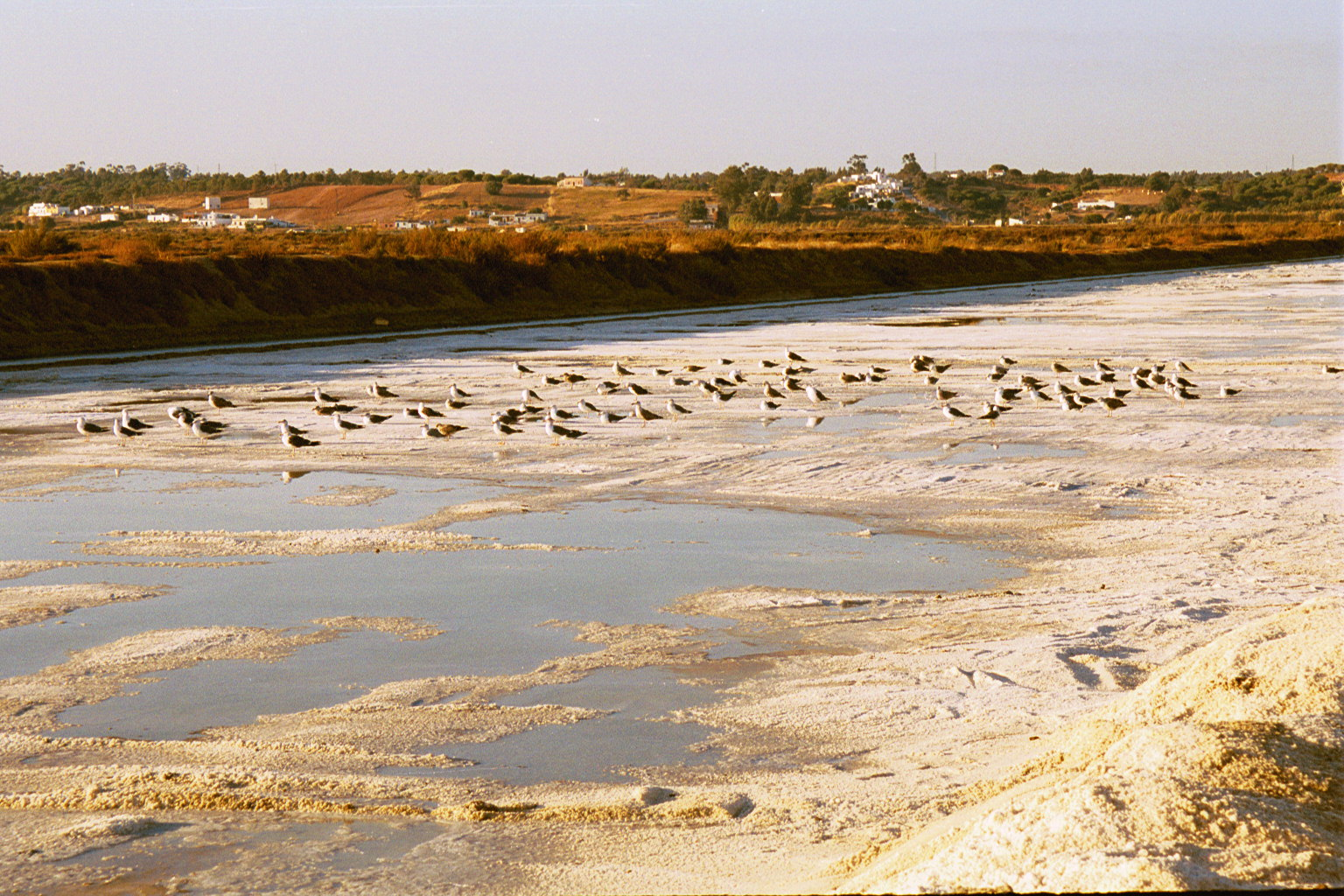
Andalusian salt ponds

Though his business focus was on merchant maritime transportation, Martínez de Pinillos remained engaged in a number of other economic activities, most of them inherited from his father; in historiography he is referred to also as „comerciante”, „industrial” and „terrateniente”.

His industrial activities were related to evaporation-based salt exploitation. He was the owner of Unión Salinera; the company was dealing in all types of salt business, including crushed salt for industrial and commercial purposes and refined table salt for home use. It was based on licenses to exploit extensive salt ponds at the outskirts of Cádiz; one, named "La Tapa", was located in El Puerto de Santa María, others, named "San Félix", "San Miguel" and "Dolores", were located in Rio Arillo. Martínez de Pinillos owned also salt installations on Rio Guadalete. Exact scale of the business is not clear, though it was significant at least on the Andalusian scale; Unión Salinera for years advertised in the local press and they operated own railway facilities, including an industrial spur along the Cádiz – Seville line.

In the neighboring province of Seville Martínez de Pinillos possessed land estates totaling 2,625 ha, all located along the banks of the Guadalquivir near Villanueva del Rio. By Northern Spanish standards they were massive; also in Andalusia their size rendered Martínez de Pinillos one of the major terratenientes, though not among the largest ones; the largest national holdings exceeded 50,000 ha and in the Cordoba district alone there were around 15 landholders with estates exceeding 2,500 ha. As late as in the 1970s the estate, almost undiminished in size and at that time owned by Martínez de Pinillos’ daughter, was the 5th largest holding in the Seville province and the 8th largest holding in the entire Ribera de Guadalquivir.

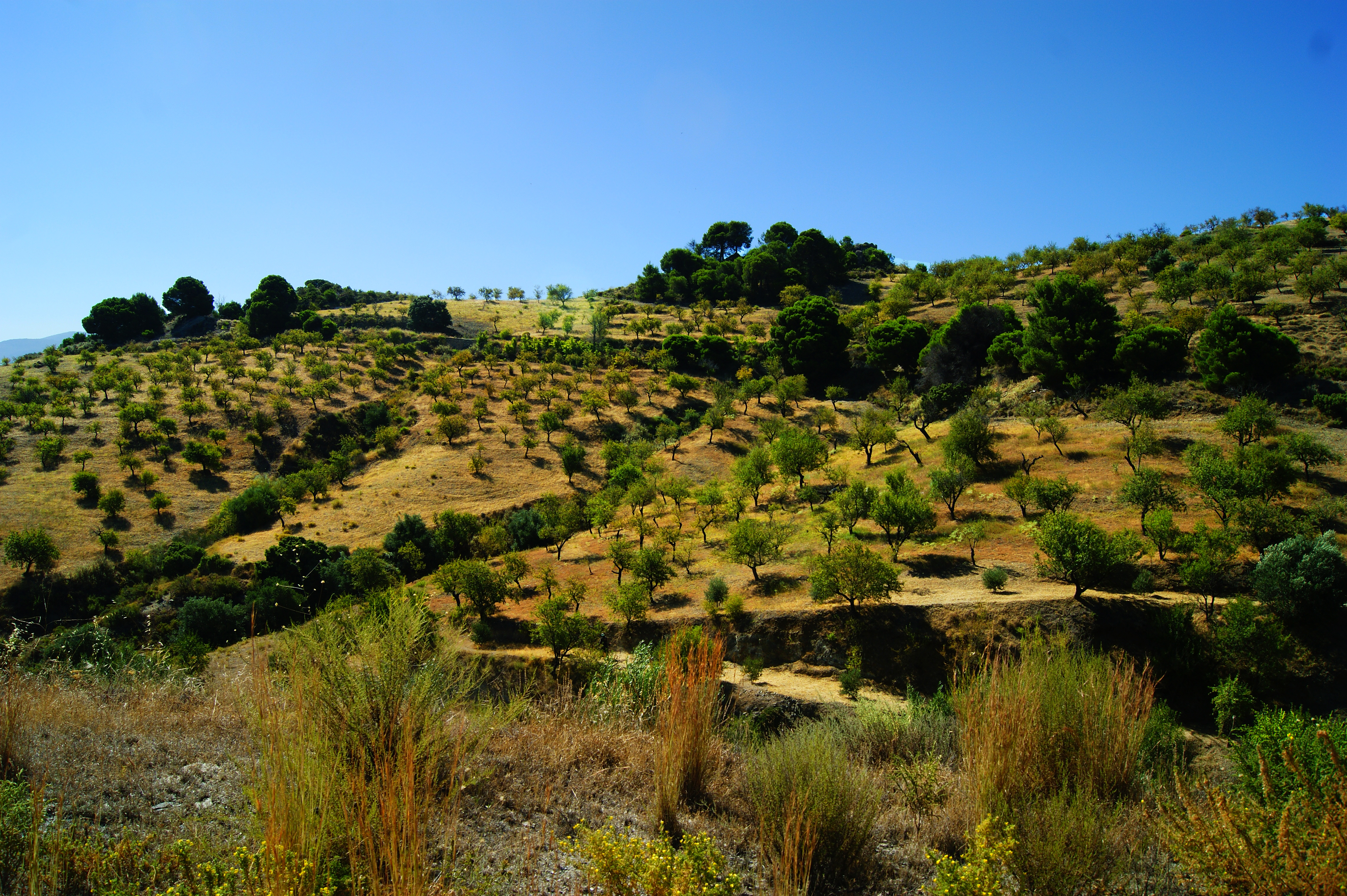
Andalusian landscape

Already in the late 19th century known in the local press as „conocido comerciante”, later on Martínez de Pinillos emerged as tycoon of the provincial economy, his wealth translating into position in a number of corporative bodies, institutions and pressure groups. In the early 20th century he entered the local Cádiz Cámara de Comercio; entrusted with lobbying with central authorities in Madrid, later on he grew to vice-president of the Chamber, elected also vice-president of the Cádiz Liga Marítima. In 1936–1942 he was president of Caja de Ahorros y Monte de Piedad de Cádiz. He is not known to have performed any official duties in local administration, though during his Cortes tenure he occasionally represented the Cádiz ayuntamiento in some business dealings. His combined income rendered him one of wealthiest men in the area and the second taxpayer of the Cádiz province. His 1930 contribution to the fiscal office was 17,831 pesetas; at that time annual budget of a 50,000-inhabitant Spanish city was around 1m ptas.

== Politics ==
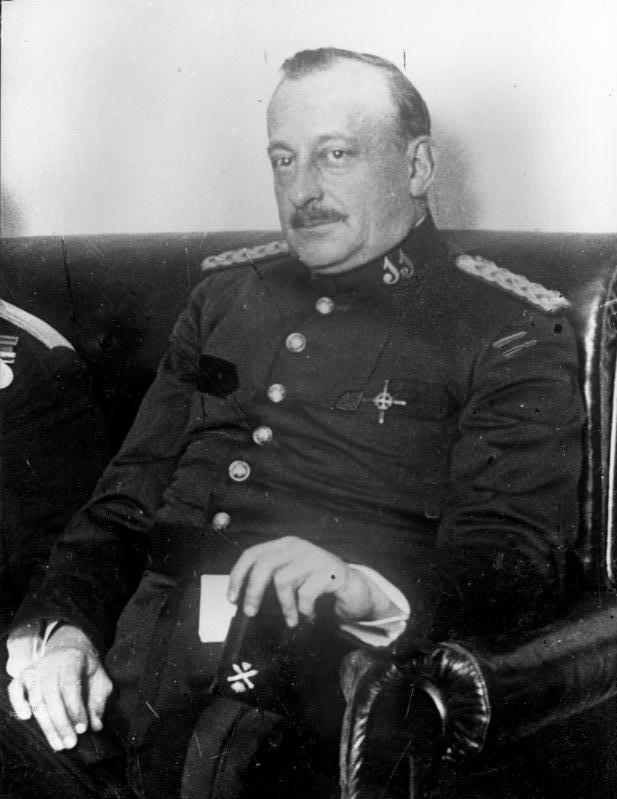
Miguel Primo de Rivera

Political preferences of Pinillos’ ancestors are unclear; it is merely known that he was raised in a pious Catholic ambience. One authors claims he embraced an Integrist outlook, information not confirmed in the Integrist press of the era. Though his cousin Sebastian Martínez de Pinillos was in 1918 elected to Cortes from Cádiz on the conservative ticket, none of the sources consulted refers to Miguel's political activity during the Restauración period. Apart from high-life engagements, his only non-commercial public endeavors were related to charity.

Martínez de Pinillos was first noted in politics when engaged in local incarnations of the primoderiverista regime. He became member of Somatén and joined Unión Patriotica, in the mid-1920s growing to vice-president of its provincial Cádiz branch. In April 1925 he was offered seat in the Diputación Provincial, though it is not clear how long he performed the role. In the late 1920s he was active in Patronal del Comercio, Industria y Navegación, an attempt to form a domesticated labor organization. During Dictablanda he seemed leaning towards a cautious "law and order" stance, as late as in February 1931 presiding over initiatives in support of the army and Guardia Civil.

During early months of the Republic Pinillos was active in a local, vaguely conservative Acción Ciudadana, in January 1932 emerging as its president. The formation was leaning towards Alfonsist monarchism; it hosted one of the most prestigious Acción Nacional politicians, Antonio Goicoechea. In early 1933 Martínez de Pinillos was still reported vice-president, but he left before AC got incorporated into CEDA. Having neared the Carlists, during the 1933 electoral campaign he already represented their Comunión Tradicionalista on a coalition Frente de Derechas list. Elected, he joined the Carlist minority. Though he moved from Cádiz to Madrid and set up his headquarters in hotel Ritz, Martínez de Pinillos remained a passive parliamentarian. He joined Comisión de Marina but did not speak a single time during the plenary chamber sessions, which did not spare him mockery in Republican press.

Carlist standard

Pinillos remained moderately active in Carlist realm; he is scarcely mentioned as taking part in party propaganda gatherings or as active in the party structures; his most significant appointment was to Comisión de Hacienda of the Traditionalist executive. His most notable high-profile event was a massively attended 1934 feast of Andalusian Carlists on the estate of Quintillo. Featured among most prominent party leaders he seemed overwhelmed, as reflected in one of his few literary attempts. Taking advantage of his wealth, he was rather listed among those who financially supported Carlist sport ventures, Traditionalist labor organizations and the party press. Martínez de Pinillos is not noted as engaged in the 1936 electoral campaign; according to one source, following outbreak of the Civil War he withdrew from active politics.

== Last years ==
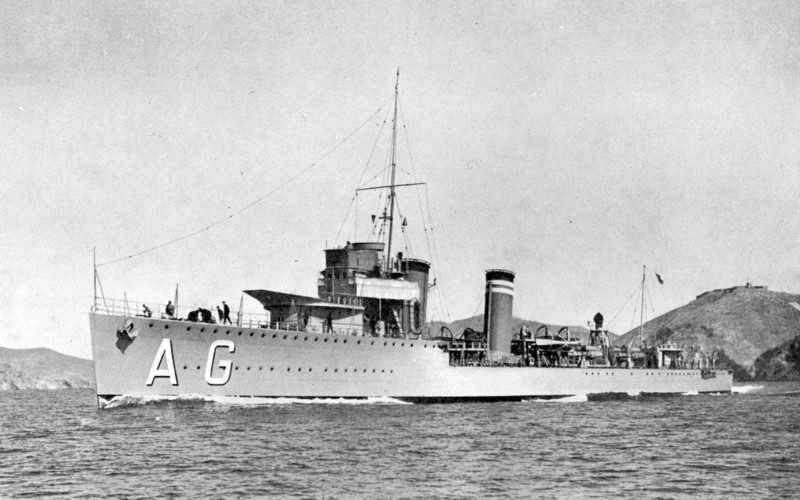
Republican navy

Pinillos took part in the 1936 conspiracy; he agreed with Varela that Ebro, Sil, Turia and Darro would be transporting troops from Morocco to Cádiz. The plan did not work out as most crews remained loyal to the government. Most other vessels happened to have been in the Republican zone and were seized by the Republicans. Darro was renamed into Lealtad and turned into an armed merchantman; she served in few combat missions until immobilised in Marseille in early 1939. Sil initially served as a prison ship, anchored at Alicante and Cartagena; in August 1936 she was site to execution of some 120 military prisoners, held aboard. Together with Vasco, Turia and Duero she later resumed transport duties; some ships served the Republicans travelling as far as to Mexico.

During the outbreak of hostilities Ebro was en route from Las Palmas to Sète, where she anchored on July 23. Immediately claimed by the Madrid government, she had sailed out before the French could make their mind. As the rebels lacked international recognition, in Genoa Ebro was renamed to Aniene, operated by an Italian company; it is not clear to what extent Pinillos engineered the plot. She served on supply routes from Italy until the end of war, when returned to the owner. One or more vessels which remained operated by Pinillos already in October 1938 were offering regular service between the Canary Islands and Andalusia; the same year Pinillos bought a new ship, Tormes. He strove to recover the vessels lost, raising ownership claims before port authorities in third countries. By mid-1939 most ships seized by the Republicans or interned in Britain, Belgium and the Netherlands, returned to the owner.

After the war Martínez de Pinillos narrowed the scope of his business further on and focused on transporting fruits; in 1940 he renamed the company to Compañia Marítima Frutera. In the 1940s he bought larger vessels: Villafranca and Almadén exceeded 4,000 GR. Some of the fleet suffered various naval incidents, e.g. in 1943 one was inflicted damage having struck a mine. When running his own company Pinillos avoided tragedies which haunted him since the 1916-1919 disasters. The only ship lost was Duero, which in 1953 collided with a British tanker; she sank with no loss of life.

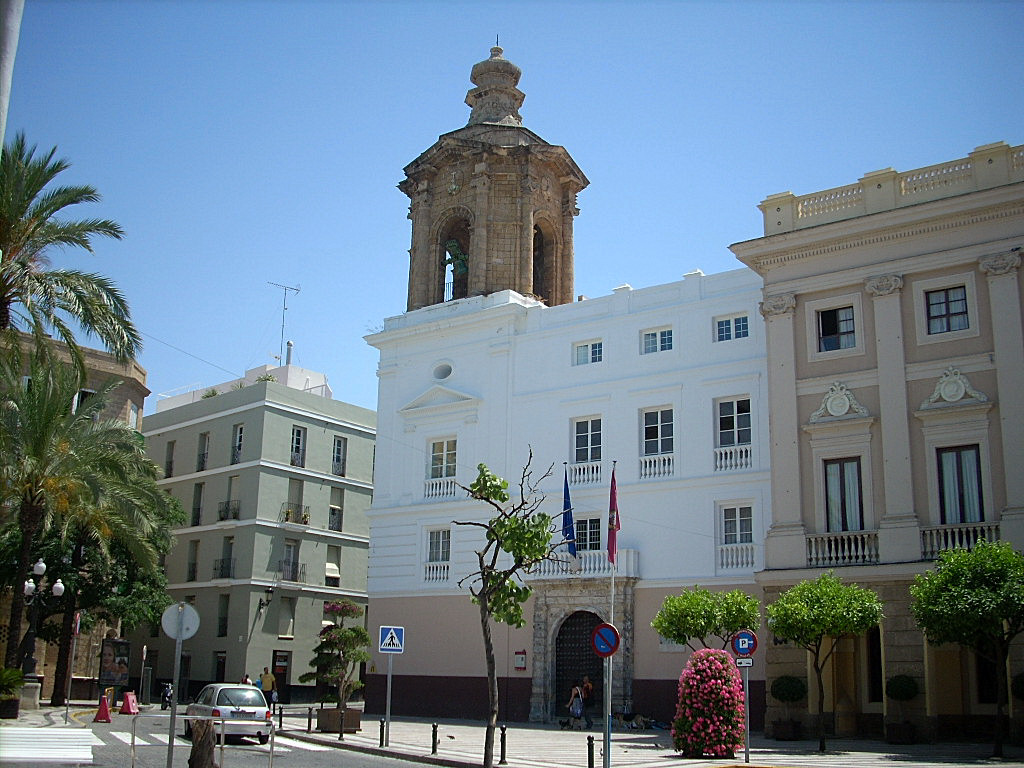
Hospital de San Juan de Dios

Nothing is known of Pinillos political activity during early Francoism; most information referring to him in the 1940s is related to business, either to his fleet or to his saline and landholding operations. Following the 1951 tragic loss of his only son, he embarked on massive charity projects. His key venture was total rehaul of Hospital de San Juan de Dios; as instead of refurbishment works it turned into constructing a new facility, the total sum donated neared 200m pesetas. Pinillos did not live to finalise the project, which was completed by his daughter Carmen. The Hospital re-opened in 1958, hosting the bust of Martinez de Pinillos in the lobby; it is not clear whether the bust is still there.
