= Amalia Martínez =

Mexican optical metrology researcher

Amalia Martínez García is a Mexican physicist whose research concerns the combination of optics and metrology. She is a researcher in the Centro de Investigaciones en Optica in León, Guanajuato, the former director of the center, and a past president of the Academia Mexicana de Óptica.

== Education and career ==
Martínez studied physics as an undergraduate at the Autonomous University of Nuevo León. She earned a master's degree in applied physics at the Ensenada Center for Scientific Research and Higher Education (CICESE), joined CICESE as a researcher in 1987, and completed a Ph.D. through the Centro de Investigaciones en Optica, where she moved in 2002.

She was director of the Centro de Investigaciones en Optica in 2013, and president of the Academia Mexicana de Óptica (AMO) for 2015–2016. At the Centro de Investigaciones en Optica, she continues to head the Optical and Mechanical Testing Lab. She is a Level-III member of the Sistema Nacional de Investigadores.

== Recognition ==
Optica named her as a 2024 Optica Fellow, "for significant contributions to 3D optical metrology, student training, and the advancement of science in Mexico and Latin America".
