= Javier Martínez (football manager) =

Mexican football manager (born 1972)

Personal information
- Full name: Javier Martínez Espinoza
- Date of birth: March 19, 1972 (age 54)
- Place of birth: Mexico

Managerial career
- Years: Team
- 2016: Deportivo Carchá
- 2017: Juventus FC
- 2018: Vipers SC
- 2019: Rayon Sports FC

Javier Martínez Espinoza (born 19 March 1972) is a Mexican football manager who last managed Rayon Sports FC.

== Early life ==
He studied aviation. He obtained his managerial certifications in 2013.

== Career ==
In 2016, he was appointed manager of Guatemalan side Deportivo Carchá. His appointment was criticized by some supporters of the club. In 2017, he was appointed manager of Nicaraguan side Juventus FC. He was regarded to have helped the club escape relegation. In 2018, he was appointed manager of Ugandan side Vipers SC. He was also described as "had no respect for any of his technical staff... often, he would make last gasp changes to the line-up agreed on by the staff... seemed to bench players for no apparent reason". He was described as "biggest undoing was the subdued manner in which Vipers got knocked out of the CAF Champions league by Algerian side CS Constantine losing home and away. His sacking may also have been triggered by pressure from the 12th player". In 2019, he was appointed manager of Rwandan side Rayon Sports FC. He was unbeaten during his first three games in charge of the club.

== Personal life ==
He has been married. He has two sons.
