= Sergio Martínez =

Sergio Martínez may refer to:

- Sergio Martínez (boxer) (born 1975), Argentine boxer
- Sergio Martínez (cyclist) (1943–1979), Cuban Olympic cyclist
- Sergio Martínez (swimmer) (born 1936), Colombian Olympic swimmer
- Sergio Martínez (footballer, born 1969), Uruguayan footballer
- Sergio Martínez (footballer, born 2007), Spanish footballer
- Sergio Martínez Ballesteros (born 1975), Spanish footballer
- Sergio Castro Martínez (born 1941), Mexican humanitarian
