= Jennifer S. Martinez =

American nanoscientist

Jennifer Suzanne Martinez is an American nanoscientist known for her research on fluorescent silver nanoclusters and their applications as biosensors. Other topics in her research include nanoscale superlattices, and the genetic engineering of biomolecules that interact with metals. She works at the Los Alamos National Laboratory, where she is deputy director of the Materials Physics and Applications Division.

== Education and career ==
Martinez was a chemistry major at the University of Utah. She completed her Ph.D. at the University of California, Santa Barbara under the supervision of Alison Butler.

She joined the Los Alamos National Laboratory in 2002, initially as a Director's Postdoctoral Fellow, and remained there until 2018, when she took a position at Northern Arizona University as a professor in the Department of Applied Physics and Materials Science and founding director of the Center for Materials Interfaces in Research and Applications (¡MIRA!). In 2022 she returned to the Los Alamos National Laboratory as deputy director of the Materials Physics and Applications Division.

== Recognition ==
Martinez was a 2007 recipient of the Presidential Early Career Award for Scientists and Engineers. She was elected as a Fellow of the American Association for the Advancement of Science in 2012. In 2016 the Los Alamos National Laboratory gave her their Fellows Prize.
