= Institut für Mobil- und Satellitenfunktechnik =

German research organization

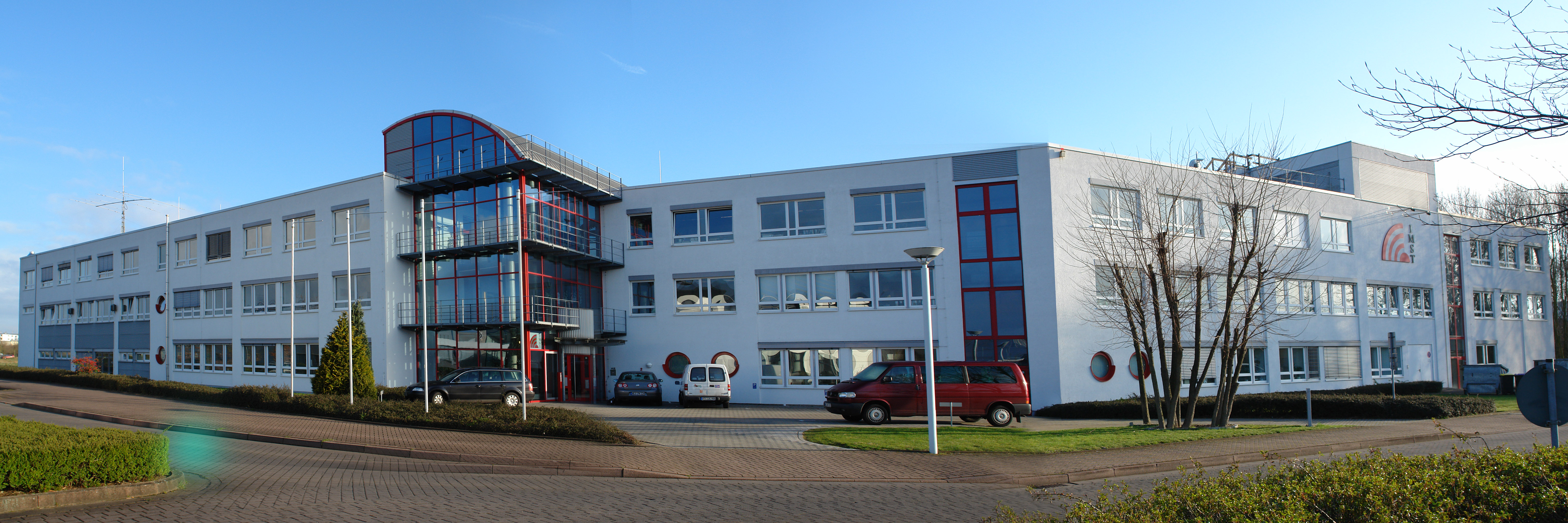

The Institut für Mobil- und Satellitenfunktechnik (IMST; German for Institute for Mobile and Satellite Communication Technology) is an independent research organization located in North Rhine-Westphalia, Germany. It was formed as a privately owned company, with limited liability GmbH, in 1992.

== Research Institute IMST ==
IMST is an associated research organization for Mobile and Satellite Communication Technology to the University of Duisburg-Essen, Germany. This connection “enables a direct link to leading edge science and technology research”. The main objective of the company's establishment at the Lower-Rhine area (west of the Rhine-Ruhr industrial zone) was the transfer of scientific and applied research knowledge to the industry, while being a competent partner and companion along the value chain for the industry, mainly in telecommunications.

IMST is an independent organization and acts as a commercial organization. From its own self-image IMST sees itself as a technology-oriented development house for radio systems and microelectronics, with emphasis on contract research and licensing of technology. IMST is heavily involved in the research programs of the European Union as well.

== Main activities ==
IMST is involved in four primary focus areas.

1. IMST.Research: Applied research for radio communications, radar systems, microsystems and nanoelectronics.
2. IMST.Development: Contract-based industrial design and development, from microelectronics to product realizations in software and hardware.
3. IMST.Products: EDA-Electronic Design Automation Software: Empire - A full 3D electromagnetic simulation tool, wireless solutions and radio modules.
4. IMST.Testing: Accredited test center for general Type Approval, mobile terminals, antennas and RF circuits.

=== Research Objectives ===
The scope of IMST's research includes ll areas and applications where wireless technology in some form plays a role, in particular telecommunications and IT, automation, automotive and medical.
