= Laia Martínez i López =

Catalan writer and musician

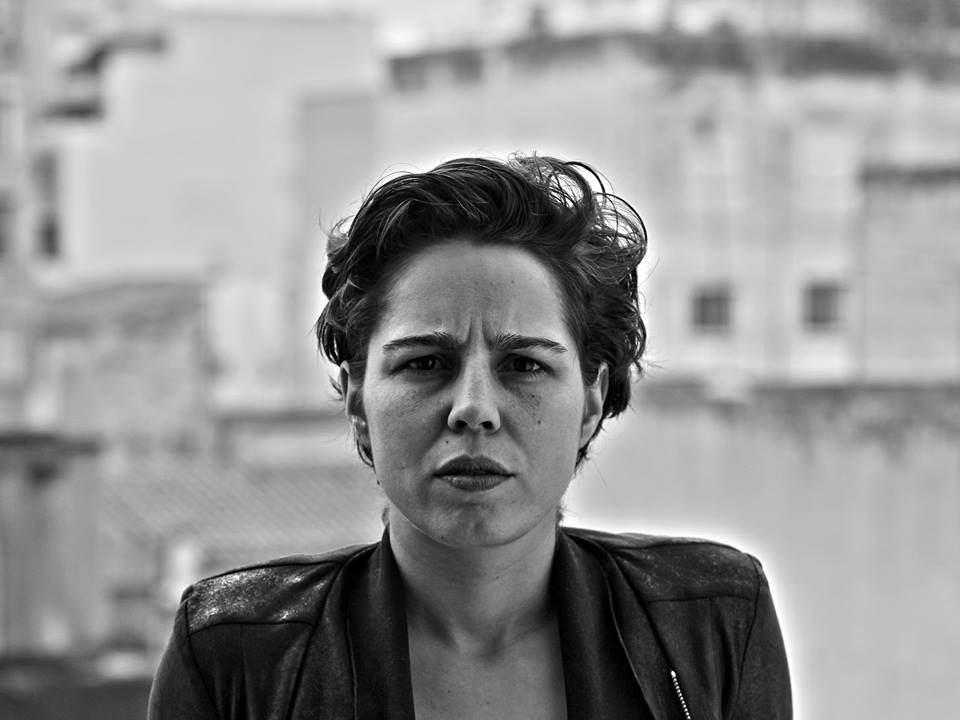
- Laia Malo in 2016
- Born: 1984; Berga, Catalonia; Spain
- Other name: Laia MaLo
- Occupations: writer, musician, translator
- Years active: 2007
- Website: laiamalo.com

Laia Martínez i López (born 1984), also known as Laia MaLo, is a Catalan writer and musician.

== Life ==
Malo was born in Berga, Catalonia, Spain on the 21 April 1984. In 2007, she graduated from the Autonomous University of Barcelona in Translation and Interpreting.

== Career ==
Since 2012 she is part of the electronic duo Jansky with Jaume Reus, which has published, with the record label Primeros Pasitos, the albums Un big bang a la gibrella and ÈÉ in 2013 and 2015, respectively. Their latest LP, This is electroverse was published in 2018 with Hidden Track Records. Since 2014 she has been vocal for Mallorca of the Associació d'Escriptors en Llengua Catalana (AELC).

In 2015 she finished her third work Cançó amb esgarrip i dos poemes. Her collection Afollada, published in 2016, addresses the issue of motherhood and presents itself as a song to freedom. Her latest collection is Venus volta (Lleonard Muntaner, 2018).

== Awards ==
In 2011 she won the Art Jove poetry prize of 2010 for her book L'estiu del tonight, tonight. and which has been translated into Spanish. In 2018 Jansky won the SUNS Award to Best European Band in a Minorized Language (Udine, Italy).

== Translations ==
Malo signed the first Catalan translation of Patti Smith. The collection of poems Auguris d'innocència (Auguries of innocence) was published in 2019 by Labreu Edicions. She also translated Djuna Barnes’ novel Nightwood for the same publisher, in 2021.
