= Mariano Martinez (entrepreneur) =

American entrepreneur and restaurateur

Mariano Martinez (born 1944) is an American entrepreneur, restaurateur, and creative artist. In Dallas, Texas, in 1971, he adapted a slurpee machine to making margaritas and dubbed it "The World’s First Frozen Margarita Machine". That machine is now in the collection of the National Museum of American History, part of the Smithsonian Institution.

== Early life ==
Martinez was born in Dallas, Texas, in the Little Mexico neighborhood. Spanish was his first language, but when he was five years old, his family was the first Mexican-American family to move into Lakewood, Dallas, where he learned to speak English so he could attend school. At the age of nine, he began working in his father's Mexican restaurant as a busboy. He dropped out of high school to work. He also played electric bass guitar for a Dallas rock band, but found that he had only average talent as a musician, so decided to go back to school. He obtained his GED at the age of 21 and then an associate degree in business from El Centro College. In 1973, Mariano married Wanda Wade.

== Professional career ==
In 1971, Martinez opened his own restaurant, Mariano's Mexican Cuisine, in Dallas by selling everything he owned to obtain a S.B.A. loan. Mariano currently owns and operates five Mexican restaurants in North Texas that employ more than 600 people and serve 1.3 million guests per year.

=== Invention of the World's First Frozen Margarita Machine ===
Martinez used his father's margarita recipe in his new restaurant. Mariano used his show business contacts to generate word-of-mouth about the new Mexican restaurant, Mariano's Mexican Cuisine, which resulted in large crowds.

Demand for his blended margarita was high, but the bar staff could not keep up with orders, as over 200 per night were produced from just one blender. Customers complained that the drinks tasted different each time, and Martinez realized that his bartenders did not take the time to measure out the drink's ingredients. His head bartender complained that the drink was too complicated and threatened to quit. Faced with both unhappy bartenders and dissatisfied customers, Martinez resolved to find a better way. At a local 7-Eleven, he noticed the Slurpee machine, and he realized he could premix the margarita and the bartenders would simply pull the lever to dispense it. He tried to buy a frozen drink machine but was told no, as they were leery of his intention and said his idea would not work because alcohol does not freeze.

Martinez finally bought a used ice cream machine on May 11, 1971 and modified the machine and his recipe to make frozen margaritas. It was a "simple spigot with a lever, a steel cup holder in which to place a glass, some buttons and vents". The machine was moved to Mariano's bar where it was placed front and center, and soon customers began to ask for the frozen margarita by name.

At this time, Texas prohibited selling liquor by the glass in the dining rooms of restaurants, so Mariano's Mexican Cuisine was operated as a private club. But later in 1971, the law was changed to allow restaurants in wet counties to sell cocktails by the glass. Sales of the already popular frozen margarita soared as a result, and Mariano's became the destination for cocktails in Dallas. As popularity of the drink increased and word of mouth traveled, other versions of The World's First Frozen Margarita Machine hit the market and even became standard bar equipment. This was due in part to Mariano's lack of a patent on the machine. Mariano never sought to be an inventor, he simply wanted to keep his doors open, protect his reputation and live the American Dream of owning his own business. In the process of doing so, he impacted several industries. The frozen margarita machine streamlined the process of making frozen margaritas, increasing U.S. demand for the largely unknown Mexican spirit tequila, and contributed to the popularity of the Tex-Mex cuisine with which it was often paired.

=== Retirement to the Smithsonian ===
In 2005, after 34 years at the original location of Mariano's Mexican Cuisine, Mariano retired the original frozen margarita machine and donated it to the Smithsonian's National Museum of American History. In September 2010, in celebration of National Inventors Month, Smithsonian.com's "Around the Mall" blog announced the "Top Ten Inventions from the National Museum of American History’s Collection", with Martinez's frozen margarita machine as number ten. On November 20, 2012, an exhibition at the Smithsonian’s National Museum of American History, FOOD: Transforming the American Table, 1950-2000 included Martinez's invention.
