= Javi Martínez (footballer, born 1987) =

Spanish footballer

Personal information
- Full name: Javier Martínez González
- Date of birth: 27 June 1987 (age 39)
- Place of birth: Tarancón, Spain
- Height: 1.79 m (5 ft 10 1/2 in)
- Position: Goalkeeper

Team information
- Current team: Quintanar Rey

Youth career
- Albacete

Senior career*
Years	Team	Apps	(Gls)
2005–2007	Albacete B		
2006–2008	Albacete	23	(0)
2008–2009	Ceuta	5	(0)
2009–2010	Conquense	12	(0)
2010–2011	Oviedo	1	(0)
2011–2014	Quintanar Rey	59	(0)

International career
2002–2003	Spain U16	5	(0)
- * Club domestic league appearances and goals as of 16 January 2015

Javier 'Javi' Martínez González (born 27 June 1987) is a Spanish footballer who plays as a goalkeeper.

== Football career ==
Martínez was born in Tarancón, Province of Cuenca. During his career, spent mainly in the third division, he played for hometown's Albacete Balompié, AD Ceuta, UB Conquense, Real Oviedo and CD Quintanar del Rey. In the 2006–07 season the 19-year-old appeared in 13 Segunda División games for the first club, in an eventual sixth-place finish.

Martínez represented Spain at the 2007 FIFA U-20 World Cup.
