= Ronaldo Martínez (activist) =

Throat cancer survivor

Ronaldo Martínez (born January 1, 1953) is a cancer survivor who appeared in a series of much-publicized anti-smoking television commercials in the Northeastern United States. The commercials, originally produced and broadcast in Massachusetts in 2000 and reprised by The New York City Health Department in 2006, gained notoriety for their graphic depiction of Martínez's life after throat cancer.

Martínez was 39 when he was diagnosed with laryngeal cancer, according to one of the commercials. He had his larynx removed and, as a result, requires an artificial voice box in order to talk. The procedure left him with a permanent hole in the middle of his neck. Martínez lives in the Bronx in New York City, having moved from Puerto Rico.

== Anti-smoking commercials ==
The public service campaign was produced by Geovision and consisted of eight 30-second commercials filmed in Boston. A number of them featured Martínez's post-cancer day-to-day struggles. They premiered on Massachusetts stations on September 20, 2000, in both English and Spanish and targeted Black people and minorities. The most notorious of these shows Martínez cleaning the hole in his throat with a cotton swab.

The commercials began airing in New York City in early 2006 as part of the city Health Department's new anti-smoking campaign.
