= Martin's =

Martin's may refer to:

== Places ==
- Martin's Additions, Maryland, USA
- Martin's Battery, Gibraltar
- Martin's Beach, California, USA
- Martin's Brandon Church, Virginia, USA
- Martin's Brook, Nova Scotia, Canada
- Martin's Cave, Gibraltar
- Martin's Church, Copenhagen, Denmark
- Martin's Church, Turku, Finland
- Martin's Cove, Wyoming, USA
- Martin's Evangelical Church, South Dakota, USA
- Martin's Fork (Cumberland River tributary), Kentucky, USA
- Martin's Haven, Wales, UK
- Martin's Hundred, early 17th-century plantation in Virginia, USA
- Martin's Location, New Hampshire, USA
- Martin's Mill, Texas, USA
  - Martin's Mill Independent School District, Texas, USA
  - Martin's Mill Junior/Senior High School, Texas, USA
- Martin's Mills, Tennessee, USA
- Martin's Point, North Carolina, USA
- Martin's River, Nova Scotia, Canada
- Martin's Tavern, Washington DC, USA

== Companies ==
- Martin's (New York), specialty apparel retailer, New York, USA
- Martin's (Newsagent), former UK chain of newsagent stores
- Martin's BBQ, Puerto Rican cuisine fast food restaurant chain
- Martin's Famous Pastry Shoppe, Pennsylvania, USA
- Martin's Food Markets, grocery chain operated by Giant-Carlisle
- Martin's Potato Chips, USA
- Martin's Super Markets, grocery chain headquartered in South Bend, Indiana, USA

== Science ==
- Martin's Axiom, mathematical axiom
- Martin's bent-toed gecko (Cyrtodactylus martini)
- Martin's blue (Kretania martini), North African butterfly
- Martin's desert racer (Mesalina martini), species of sand-dwelling lizard
- Martin's false sergeant (Pseudathyma martini), African butterfly
- Martin's lichen moth (Cisthene martini)
- Martin's spurge (Euphorbia × martini), hybrid flowering plant
- Martin's sulfurane, organosulfur compound
- Martin's toadlet (Uperoleia martini), Australian frog

== Media ==
- Martin's Close, 1911 ghost story by British writer M. R. James
- Martin's Day, 1985 American drama film
- Martin's Lie, 1964 chamber opera by Gian Carlo Menotti

== Other ==
- Martin's cruise of 1794, French naval operation
- Martin's Light Railways, India

== See also ==
- Martin (disambiguation)
- Martins (disambiguation)
- Martin's Mill Covered Bridge (disambiguation)
- St. Martin's (disambiguation)
