= Martins =

Martins may refer to:

== Names ==
- Martins (surname)
- Martin's (born 1999), cameroonian singer
- Mārtiņš, a Latvian masculine given name
- Martins Amaewhule, Nigerian politician
- Martins Azubuike, Nigerian politician
- Martins Babale (b. 1959), Nigerian politician
- Martins Dukurs (b. 1984), Latvian skeleton racer
- Martins Ekwueme (b. 1985), Nigerian-born Polish soccer player
- Martins Igbanu (b. 1997), Nigerian basketball player
- Martins Imhangbe (b. 1991), British-Nigerian actor
- Martins Licis (b. 1990), Latvian-American strongman
- Martins Pena (1815–1848), Brazilian playwright

== Places ==
- Martins, Rio Grande do Norte, Brazil
- Martins (Martti), fourth district of Turku, Finland
- Martins Bank Building, Liverpool, UK
- Martins Bay, Fiordland, New Zealand
- Martins Creek (disambiguation)
- Martins Ferry, California, US
- Martins Ferry, Ohio, US
  - Martins Ferry High School
- Martins Fork Lake, Kentucky, US
- Martins Head, Antarctica
- Martins Heron, Berkshire, England, UK
  - Martins Heron railway station
- Martins Point, Nova Scotia, Canada
- Martins Pond, Massachusetts, USA
- Martins Pond Site, Maryland, USA
- Martins Run, Ohio, USA
- Martins Soares, Minas Gerais, Brazil
- Martins Store, Virginia, USA
- Martins Trailer Court, Alberta, Canada
- Pinto Martins International Airport, in Fortaleza, Ceará, Brazil

== Other ==
- Jerónimo Martins, Portugal-based company
- Martin (bird) are passerine birds akin to swallows
- Mārtiņš (Latvian god), god who protected the Latvian people
- Martins Bank, former London private bank
- Martins Ferry Times Leader, newspaper
- Martins Motorsports, American stock car racing team
- Martins Tagebuch, 1955 East German film
- Honório de Freitas Guimarães (1902–1968), member of the Brazilian Communist Party

== See also ==
- Martin (disambiguation)
- Martin's (disambiguation)
- Martens (disambiguation)
- Martínez (surname), a Spanish surname equivalent to Portuguese patronymic
