= Martins Creek =

Martins Creek or Martin Creek may refer to several places:

== Australia ==
- Martins Creek, New South Wales, a small village in the Hunter Valley
  - Martins Creek railway station
- Martins Creek, a tributary of the Karuah River in the Great Lakes Council area
- Martins Creek, a tributary of the Nattai River in the Wollondilly Shire

== United States ==
=== Inhabited places ===
- Brainards, New Jersey, formerly known as Martin's Creek
- Martins Creek, North Carolina, an unincorporated community in Cherokee County
- Martins Creek, Pennsylvania, an unincorporated town in Northampton County

=== Waterways ===
- Martin Creek (Sausal Creek tributary), a creek in California
- Martin Creek (Larabee Creek tributary), a creek in California
- Martin Creek (Chestatee River tributary), a stream in the U.S. state of Georgia
- Martin Creek (Hiwassee River tributary), a stream in North Carolina
- Martins Creek (Delaware River tributary, Bucks County), Tullytown, Pennsylvania
- Martins Creek (Delaware River tributary), a stream in eastern Pennsylvania
- Martins Creek (Tunkhannock Creek tributary), a stream in northeastern Pennsylvania
- Martin Creek (Susquehanna River tributary), Wyoming County, Pennsylvania
- Martin Creek (Tennessee), in Putnam and Jackson Counties

== See also ==
- Marten Creek (disambiguation)
