= Martin =

Martin may refer to:

== Places ==
=== Antarctica ===
- Martin Peninsula, Marie Byrd Land
- Point Martin, South Orkney Islands

=== Europe ===
- Martin, Croatia, a village
- Martin, Slovakia, a city
- Martín del Río, Aragón, Spain
- Martín River, a tributary of the Ebro river in Spain
- Martin (Val Poschiavo), Switzerland

==== England ====
- Martin, Hampshire, a village and civil parish
- Martin, Kent, a hamlet
- Martin, East Lindsey, Lincolnshire, a hamlet and former parish
- Martin, North Kesteven, Lincolnshire, a village and parish
- Martin Mere, a lake in Lancashire
  - WWT Martin Mere, a wetland nature reserve that includes the lake and surrounding areas

=== North America ===
==== Canada ====
- Rural Municipality of Martin No. 122, Saskatchewan, Canada
- Martin Islands, Nunavut, Canada

==== United States ====
- Martin, Florida, an unincorporated community
- Martin, Georgia, a town
- Martin, Kentucky, a home rule-class city
- Martin, Louisiana, a village
- Martin, Michigan, a village
- Martin, Nebraska, an unincorporated community and census-designated place
- Martin, North Dakota, a city
- Martin, Ohio, an unincorporated community
- Martin, South Carolina, an unincorporated community
- Martin, South Dakota, a city
- Martin, Tennessee, a city
- Martin, Washington, a former town
- Martin, West Virginia, an unincorporated community
- Martin City (disambiguation)
- Martin County (disambiguation)
- Martin Township (disambiguation)

=== Elsewhere ===
- Martin, Western Australia, Australia, a suburb of Perth
- Martin, Saint-Jean-du-Sud, Haiti, a village

== People and fictional characters ==
- Martin (name)
  - List of people with given name Martin, a list of people and fictional characters
  - List of people with surname Martin, a list of people
- Martin (magister militum per Armeniam), East Roman general
- Martin Hoberg Hedegaard, Danish singer also known by the mononym Martin
- Martin Prakkat, an Indian film director also simply nicknamed martin
- Masayuki Suzuki, a Japanese singer nicknamed Martin
- Martin Svensson (singer), Swedish singer also known by the mononym Martin
- Martin (YouTuber), Hong Kong YouTuber
- Martín, nom de guerre of Gaspar García Laviana (1941–1978), Spanish Catholic priest and Sandinista guerrilla in Nicaragua
- FitzMartin, a mediaeval English dynasty, later called Martin

== Arts and entertainment ==
=== Film and television ===
- Martin (1977 film), directed by George A. Romero
- Martin (2024 film), an Indian Kannada-language action thriller by A. P. Arjun
- Martin (TV series), an American sitcom (1992–1997) produced by actor and comedian Martin Lawrence
- Martin (play), a 1972 television play written by Alasdair Gray
- Martin, character in Danger Rangers, an American animated television series

=== Music ===
- "Martin" (Tom Robinson song), a 1978 song by the Tom Robinson Band
- "Martin", a song on the album The Art of Falling Apart by Soft Cell
- "Martin", a song on the album Making a Door Less Open by Car Seat Headrest

== Brands and enterprises ==
- C. F. Martin & Company, a guitar company
- Glenn L. Martin Company, an aircraft manufacturer, later Martin Marietta and finally merged into Lockheed Martin
- Martin Audio, an audio equipment company, now a subsidiary of Focusrite
- Martin Band Instrument Company, an American musical instrument manufacturer
- Martin Burn, a company in India founded as Martin Company in 1890
- Martin Professional, a lighting equipment manufacturer

== Other uses ==
- Martin (bird), several species of birds in the swallow family Hirundinidae
- Martin Stadium (Washington), an outdoor athletic stadium in Pullman, Washington
- Hurricane Martin, a tropical storm in 2022
- Martin baronets, four extinct titles, one in the Baronetage of England, one in the Baronetage of Great Britain and two in the Baronetage of the United Kingdom
- Martin 16, a Canadian sailboat design for disabled sailers
- Martin 29, a Canadian sailboat design

== See also ==
- Martin's (disambiguation)
- Martin Field (disambiguation)
- Port Martin, Adélie Land, Antarctica, an abandoned French research station
- Saint Martin (disambiguation)
- St. Martin's (disambiguation)
- Marten, one of several species of carnivorous mammal
- Martian
- Martine (disambiguation)
- Marton (disambiguation)
- Martyn (surname), one of the fourteen Tribes of Galway, Ireland
