= Marten (disambiguation) =

A marten is a mammal in the family Mustelidae. Marten, Mårten, or Martén may also refer to:

== Places ==
- Marten, Bulgaria, a town
- Marten, Wiltshire, England
- Marten, a district of Dortmund, Germany
- Marten River (disambiguation)
- Marten Creek (disambiguation)

== Other uses ==
- Marten (given name), a list of people and fictional characters
- Marten (surname), a list of people
- Croatian kuna, literally "marten", from the use of marten pelts as currency
- Marten (HBC vessel), operated by the HBC from 1845-1850, see Hudson's Bay Company vessels
- Marten (HBC vessel), operated by the HBC from 1852-1878, see Hudson's Bay Company vessels
- Marten Transport, an American trucking company

== See also ==
- Mårten, a list of people with the given name
- Märten (name), a list of people with the given name or surname
- Maarten (given name)
- Martens (disambiguation)
- Martin (disambiguation)
- Marton (disambiguation)
- Martyn (disambiguation)
