= Martyn =

Martyn may refer to:

- Martyn (surname), one of the Tribes of Galway and others
- Martyn (given name)
- Martyn (musician)

== See also ==
- Martin (disambiguation)
- Marten (disambiguation)
- Martin of Tours
