= Martin Company =

Martin Company may refer to:

- Martin Burn, a company in India founded as Martin Company in 1890
- Glenn L. Martin Company, an American aircraft and aerospace manufacturing company founded in 1912 and closed in 1961

== See also ==
- Martin (disambiguation)
