= Pseudathyma legeri =

St Leger's false sergeant

Scientific classification
- Domain: Eukaryota
- Kingdom: Animalia
- Phylum: Arthropoda
- Class: Insecta
- Order: Lepidoptera
- Family: Nymphalidae
- Genus: Pseudathyma
- Species: P. legeri

Binomial name
- Pseudathyma legeri Larsen & Boorman, 1995

Species of butterfly

Pseudathyma legeri, or St Leger's false sergeant, is a butterfly in the family Nymphalidae. It is found in Nigeria, where it is only known from the Obudu Plateau. The habitat consists of sub-montane forests.
