= Pseudathyma callina =

Scientific classification
- Kingdom: Animalia
- Phylum: Arthropoda
- Clade: Pancrustacea
- Class: Insecta
- Order: Lepidoptera
- Family: Nymphalidae
- Genus: Pseudathyma
- Species: P. callina

Binomial name
- Pseudathyma callina (Grose-Smith, 1898)

Synonyms
- Neptis callina Grose-Smith, 1898

Species of butterfly

Pseudathyma callina, the calline false sergeant, is a butterfly in the family Nymphalidae. It is found in Nigeria, Cameroon, Gabon, the Republic of the Congo, the Central African Republic, the Democratic Republic of the Congo (Sankuru and Lualaba), and north-western Zambia. The habitat consists of forests.
