= Martin (YouTuber) =

Hong Kong cook

- 馬田
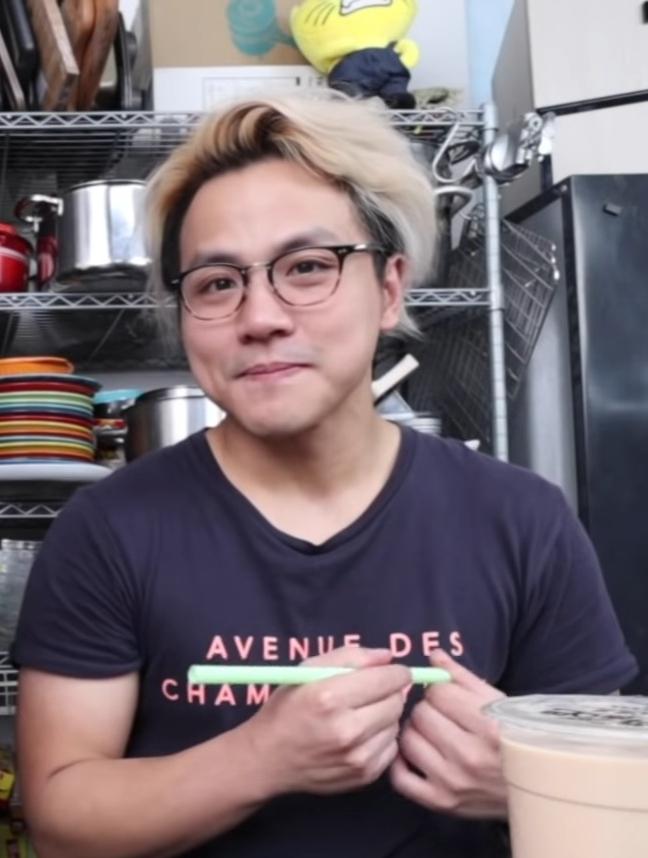
- Martin in a YouTube vlog on 6 July 2019

YouTube information
- Channels: Dim Cook Guide; Gao Shen Ma
- Years active: 2014–present
- Genres: Cooking; lifestyle; travelling
- Subscribers: 1.11 million (Dim Cook Guide); 1.32 million (Gao Shen Ma)
- Views: 206 million (Dim Cook Guide); 402 million (Gao Shen Ma)

Chinese name
- Traditional Chinese: 馬田
- Simplified Chinese: 马田
Transcriptions
Standard Mandarin
- Hanyu Pinyin: Mǎtián
Yue: Cantonese
- Jyutping: Maa^{5}tin^{4}
- Last updated: 17 June 2023

Martin (traditional Chinese: 馬田; simplified Chinese: 马田) is a Hong Kong YouTuber, television personality, and author. He created the YouTube cooking channel Dim Cook Guide (traditional Chinese: 點 Cook Guide; simplified Chinese: 点 Cook Guide) on 21 February 2014, growing it to be ranked third by number of subscribers for Hong Kong YouTube channels in 2021.

On Dim Cook Guide, Martin posts videos about how to cook food in different ways, aiming to showcase the most popular dishes that are available in local eateries. Martin posts travel vlogs and conducts food and product reviews. Martin co-created the YouTube channel Gao Shen Ma (Chinese: 搞神馬) with Taiwanese gaming YouTuber Ashan Kouki. The channel features mo lei tau humour as well as entertainment, lifestyle, kuso, Internet challenges, and unboxing content. It reached 1.3 million subscribers by the end of 2022.

Martin authored two cookbooks and started Delicious Cow Shop (Chinese: 牛旨商店), a hot pot online store that mostly sells Japanese ingredients. He competed on the ViuTV cooking reality competition show Kick Hall in 2020 and guest starred on the 2022 HOY TV cooking show Cooking in Pandemic. With Sammie Yu, he co-hosted the television programme Farmer Martin, which featured the duo visiting Hong Kong farms, fisheries, and factories in search of food and special ingredients.

== YouTube channel ==
Martin (right) in a 6 July 2019 video with fellow Hong Kong YouTuber Mira. The duo discuss what Hong Kong people like about Taiwan.

Before becoming a YouTuber, Martin was employed at a production company where his work involved taking photographs and film videos. Without any formal instruction on cooking food, he self-learned cooking during his spare time. On 21 February 2014, Martin started the YouTube channel Dim Cook Guide (Chinese: 點 Cook Guide). The channel grew to over 100,000 subscribers by 2015, which the magazine New Monday attributed to its "exquisite and simple" cooking videos. In an interview with the magazine, Martin attributed his success to prioritising "laziness". With his audience primarily being young people, he aimed to present dishes that were the most popular and available in local eateries. After researching recipes on the Internet, he modified their steps and their ingredients so that the ingredients could be purchased at supermarkets instead of specialty stores. For the Portuguese dish Serradura, he streamlined the ingredients to be Oreos and whipped cream, omitting typical ingredients like vanilla extract, sugar, and condensed milk. For over three years, Martin worked full-time at a production company and part-time as a YouTuber.

Martin's viewers call him Nam Tin (Chinese: 腩田; lit. 'Tenderloin Field'). In 2015, he collaborated with Cherry, a fellow YouTuber, to make videos on Dim Cook Guide. He recruited her to the channel with two aims. The first was to enable him to converse with another person in the videos about cooking. The second was to give viewers a woman's perspective about the dishes such as what she would give to her spouse or family during various festivals. The duo started a new channel called "Click Here Dim Click" (Chinese: Click Here點Click). To make a cooking video, they repeated takes of the video when the lighting was inadequate or the steps were not followed properly such as the butter's being insufficiently stirred or an extraneous gram of salt being added to the dish. Although initial videos took Martin 10 to 20 takes, by 2015 he was able to make videos in three to five takes. Martin makes videos about how to cook food in different ways. Martin's Dim Cook Guide cooking videos include sausage rolls made in the Hong Kong way, strawberry pork ribs, a barbecue platter, Shaoxing wine chicken, Korean fried chicken, and baked curry cottage loaf. (Note: For sausage rolls made in the Hong Kong way; For strawberry pork ribs; For barbecue platter; For Shaoxing wine chicken; For Korean fried chicken; For baked curry cottage loaf) Desserts showcased in Martin's cooking videos include pancakes, Japanese cheesecakes, and put chai ko.

On his YouTube channel, Martin posts travel vlogs to Japan, Taiwan, and other places. He conducts reviews of food and products and posts videos of his trying different kinds of alcohol. Martin collaborated with the YouTube channel Corrupt the Youth (Chinese: 好青年荼毒室) on the video series "Philosophy can make a living" (Chinese: 哲學有飯開). He collaborated with the singer and actor Ronald Cheng's YouTube channel Running Team on a 2021 video showing Martin using a washing machine to make soup. In 2015, Martin and Cherry created a sponsored video for Nestlé about the company's tofu product which played in supermarkets whenever customers scanned the QR code. In 2017, Martin partnered with Coca-Cola and Le Creuset to use the companies' soda and cookware, respectively, to make three dishes. When Martin considers requests from companies to advertise in his videos, he assesses how the companies' reputation will affect his reputation. His income is unstable. With a limited number of companies to select from to do sponsored videos, Martin sometimes fails to receive sponsorship revenue that month. His YouTube channel has three membership tiers that in 2022 cost HK$25 (US$3), HK$100 (US$13), and HK$200 (US$26). The lowest tier gave members priority purchasing of his products and allowed for emoji stickers; the middle tier allowed members to receive discounts on products; and the highest tier included the members' names in a thank you at the end of his videos.

In 2017, Martin started the YouTube channel Gao Shen Ma (Chinese: 搞神馬) with Ashan Kouki (Chinese: 阿神), a Taiwanese YouTuber who has the largest gaming channel in Taiwan. The channel reached one million subscribers in two years. According to Yahoo! News, through its mo lei tau humour and rapport between the creators, the channel accrued 1.3 million subscribers by the end of 2022. Gao Shen Ma features entertainment, lifestyle, kuso, Internet challenges, and unboxing content. Chinese Television System said that netizens are entertained through the chemistry between the duo formed from their cultural and language differences and their pleasant, sweet, and humorous interactions.

Oriental Daily in 2015 lauded Dim Cook Guide for its "fresh and lively teaching videos", while Time Out's Jenny Leung in 2020 praised Dim Cook Guide for having "a whole library of fun recipes that will keep your hands busy and stomachs full". By the end of 2021, Dim Cook Guide was ranked third by number of subscribers for Hong Kong YouTube channels. By the end of 2022, Dim Cook Guide had 1.1 million subscribers. Martin said in a YouTube video at the end of 2022 that he was making preparations for starting a restaurant in 2023. He planned to gradually cut back on making YouTube videos, explaining that he had shared almost everything he wanted to film as he had been a content creator for eight years.

== Business and writing career ==
Martin founded Delicious Cow Shop (Chinese: 牛旨商店), a hot pot online store. It primarily sells Japanese ingredients. He wrote two cookbooks: Dim Cook Guide—Hell Chef's Turnaround Gift (Chinese: 點Cook Guide──地獄廚神翻身恩物) and Martin Takes You to Deconstruct Desserts: From Entry to Advanced, a Book to Learn Professional-level Baking Techniques (Chinese: 馬田帶你解構甜點：從入門到進階，一本學會職人級烘焙技法). HK01 described both books as selling well.

== Television career ==
Martin competed in the eighth episode of the ViuTV cooking reality competition show Kick Hall which aired on 16 September 2020. In the episode, Martin went to Sham Shui Po to challenge the owner of the dai pai dong Glorious Cuisine (Chinese: 輝大排檔) on who could make a more superior version of the golden shrimp dish (Chinese: 黃金蝦). Although Martin lost the competition, the two judges and the mentor Jacques Kagi praised him for his creativity and efforts.

He was a guest star on the 2022 cooking show Cooking in Pandemic from the free-to-air Hong Kong television channel HOY TV. Martin cohosted the television programme Farmer Martin with Sammie Yu. The show aired its first episode on 26 September 2022 on HOY TV. Searching for special ingredients and food, the duo featured Hong Kong farms, fisheries, and factories.

== Bibliography ==
- Martin 馬田 (2019). 點CookGuide──地獄廚神翻身恩物 [Dim Cook Guide—Hell Chef's Turnaround Gift] (in Chinese). Hong Kong: Ming Chuang Publishing Company. ISBN 978-9-88852-519-5 – via Google Books.
- Martin 馬田 (2021). 馬田帶你解構甜點：從入門到進階，一本學會職人級烘焙技法 [Martin Takes You to Deconstruct Desserts: From Entry to Advanced, a Book to Learn Professional-level Baking Techniques] (in Chinese). Taipei: Taiwan Tohan. ISBN 978-9-86511-675-0 – via Google Books.
