= Pseudathyma cyrili =

Scientific classification
- Domain: Eukaryota
- Kingdom: Animalia
- Phylum: Arthropoda
- Class: Insecta
- Order: Lepidoptera
- Family: Nymphalidae
- Genus: Pseudathyma
- Species: P. cyrili

Binomial name
- Pseudathyma cyrili Chovet, 2002

Species of butterfly

Pseudathyma cyrili is a butterfly in the family Nymphalidae. It is found in Cameroon, the Central African Republic, the Republic of the Congo, the Democratic Republic of the Congo, Uganda and Tanzania.
