= Pseudathyma jacksoni =

Scientific classification
- Domain: Eukaryota
- Kingdom: Animalia
- Phylum: Arthropoda
- Class: Insecta
- Order: Lepidoptera
- Family: Nymphalidae
- Genus: Pseudathyma
- Species: P. jacksoni

Binomial name
- Pseudathyma jacksoni Carcasson, 1965

Synonyms
- Pseudathyma neptidina jacksoni Carcasson, 1965

Species of butterfly

Pseudathyma jacksoni is a butterfly in the family Nymphalidae. It is found in Kenya and the Democratic Republic of the Congo.

== Subspecies ==
- Pseudathyma jacksoni jacksoni (Kenya)
- Pseudathyma jacksoni kivuensis Libert, 2002 (Democratic Republic of the Congo)
