= Martin's Mill Junior/Senior High School =

Coordinates: 32°24′52″N 95°47′28″W

Location
- 301 FM 1861. Ben Wheeler, Texas 75754; United States

Information
- School type: Public high school
- School district: Martin's Mill Independent School District
- Principal: Robin Gandy
- Teaching staff: 23.22 (FTE)
- Grades: 7-12
- Enrollment: 244 (2023–2024)
- Student to teacher ratio: 10.51
- Colors: Maroon & White
- Athletics conference: UIL Class AA
- Mascot: Mustang
- Website: Martin's Mill Jr/Sr High School

Martin's Mill Junior/Senior High School is a public secondary school located in the unincorporated community of Martin's Mill, Texas, USA and classified as a 2A school by the UIL. It is a part of the Martin's Mill Independent School District located in southeastern Van Zandt County. In 2022–23, the school was rated by the Texas Education Agency as follows: 77 (C) overall, 79 (C) for Student Achievement, 75 (C) for School Progress, and 73 (C) for Closing the Gaps. It also was designated with distinction in Academic Achievement in Reading/Language Arts, Academic Achievement in Mathematics, and Academic Achievement in Science.

== Academics ==
- UIL Academic Meet Champions
  - 2011(1A)

=== Team Titles ===
- Current Issues and Events (team) - 2004, 2007
- Journalism (team) - 2011, 2013
- Literary Criticism (team) - 1998, 2000, 2004, 2005, 2007, 2008, 2009, 2011, 2012, 2013, 2014
- Spelling & Vocabulary (team) - 2009, 2011, 2012

=== Individual Titles ===
- Computer Science (individual) - 2008
- Current Issues and Events (individual) - 2004, 2007
- Editorial Writing (individual) - 2011
- Feature Writing (individual) - 2010
- Journalism's "Tops in Texas" (individual) - 2010, 2011
- Lincoln-Douglas Debate - 1993
- Literary Criticism (individual) - 1995, 1997, 1998, 2003, 2004, 2007, 2010, 2012, 2013, 2014
- News Writing (individual) - 2013
- Prose Interpretation (individual) - 2014
- Science (Biology) (individual) - 2005

== Athletics ==
The Martin's Mill Mustangs compete in these sports -

Cross Country, Basketball, Golf, Tennis, Track, Baseball & Softball

=== State titles ===
- Boys Basketball -
  - 1949(B), 2025(2A/D2)
- Girls Basketball -
  - 2006(1A/D1), 2008(1A/D1), 2013(1A/D1), 2015(2A), 2018(2A), 2019(2A), 2024(2A), 2025(2A/D2)
- Girls Golf -
  - 2008(1A),

==== State Finalist ====
- Boys Basketball -
  - 2007(1A), 2026(2A/D2)
- Girls Basketball -
  - 2010(1A/D1), 2011(1A/D1), 2012(1A/D1), 2026(2A/D2)
- Boys Golf (individual) - 2012
- Boys Cross Country (individual) - 1998
- Boys Track 3200 meter run (individual) - 1997, 1999

== Notable alumni ==
Leon Black - Former head coach of the Texas Longhorns Basketball team and also coached at nearby Van High School. Black was a member of the first Mustang state championship team in 1949.
