= Pseudathyma lucretioides =

Scientific classification
- Domain: Eukaryota
- Kingdom: Animalia
- Phylum: Arthropoda
- Class: Insecta
- Order: Lepidoptera
- Family: Nymphalidae
- Genus: Pseudathyma
- Species: P. lucretioides

Binomial name
- Pseudathyma lucretioides Carpenter & Jackson, 1950

Species of butterfly

Pseudathyma lucretioides is a butterfly in the family Nymphalidae. It is found in Kenya and Tanzania. The habitat consists of forests.

== Subspecies ==
- Pseudathyma lucretioides lucretioides (coast of Kenya)
- Pseudathyma lucretioides rondo Kielland, 1987 (Tanzania)
