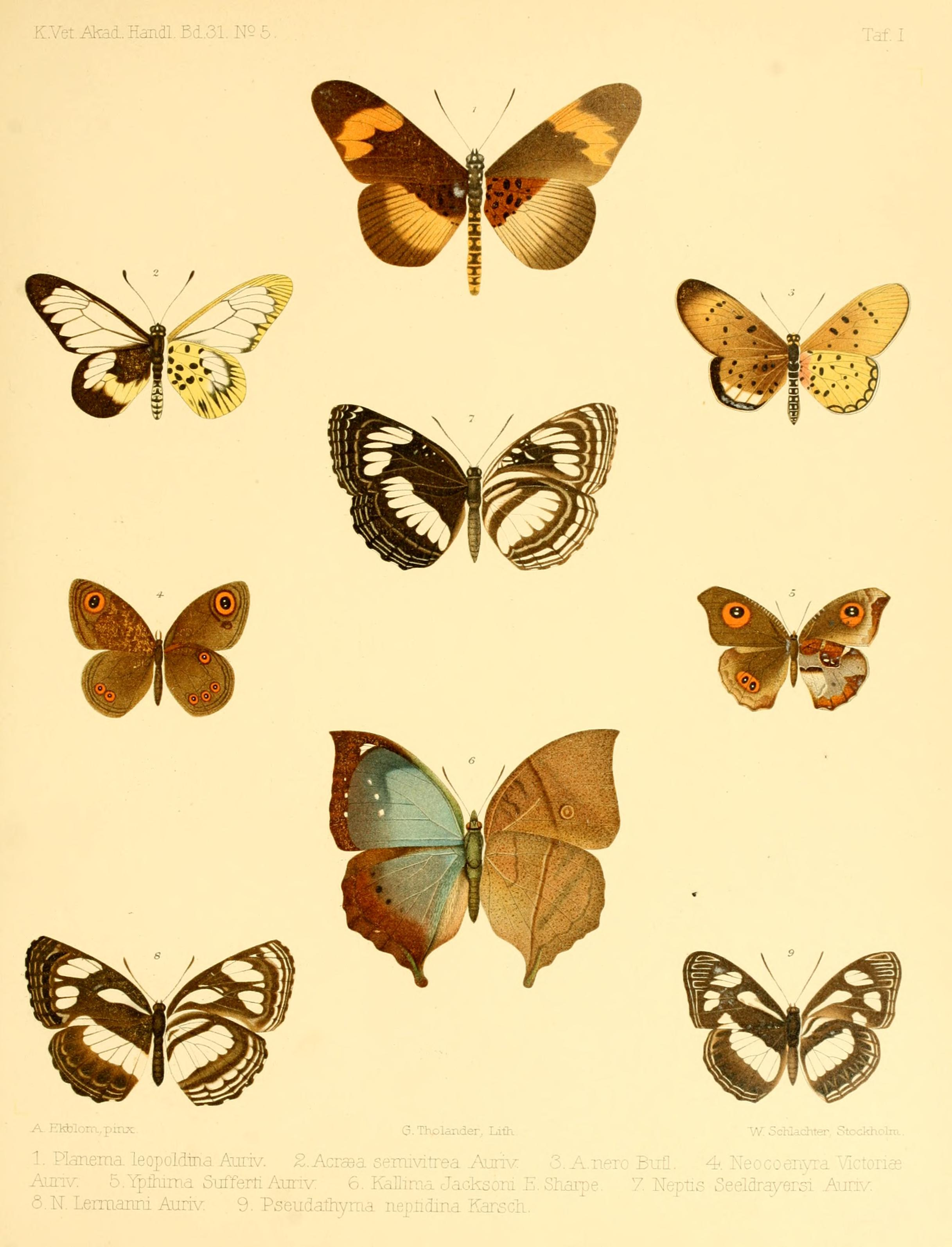
- Pseudathyma neptidina in Rhopalocera Aethiopica Aurivillius, 1899

Scientific classification
- Domain: Eukaryota
- Kingdom: Animalia
- Phylum: Arthropoda
- Class: Insecta
- Order: Lepidoptera
- Family: Nymphalidae
- Genus: Pseudathyma
- Species: P. neptidina

Binomial name
- Pseudathyma neptidina Karsch, 1894

= Pseudathyma neptidina =

Species of butterfly

Pseudathyma neptidina, the streaked false sergeant, is a butterfly in the family Nymphalidae. It is found in Guinea, Sierra Leone, Cameroon, the Republic of the Congo, the Democratic Republic of the Congo, and Uganda. Its habitat consists of forests.

The larvae feed on Chrysophyllum oblanceolatum.
