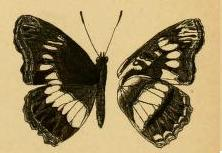

Scientific classification
- Kingdom: Animalia
- Phylum: Arthropoda
- Clade: Pancrustacea
- Class: Insecta
- Order: Lepidoptera
- Family: Nymphalidae
- Genus: Pseudathyma
- Species: P. sibyllina

Binomial name
- Pseudathyma sibyllina (Staudinger, 1890)

Synonyms
- Pseudacraea sibyllina Staudinger, 1890

= Pseudathyma sibyllina =

Sibylline false sergeant

Species of butterfly

Pseudathyma sibyllina, the Sibylline false sergeant, is a butterfly in the family Nymphalidae. It is found in Guinea, Sierra Leone, Liberia, Ivory Coast, Ghana, and Nigeria. The habitat consists of forests.

Torben Larsen developed a species numbering system for his 2005 publication Butterflies of West Africa. This species is #1134. The 'Larsen' numbers have since been used with permission in A Sharp Eye on Butterflies of Ghana.
