= Martin City =

Martin City may refer to the following places in the United States:

- Martin City, Kansas City, neighborhood of Kansas City, Missouri
- Martin City, Montana, census-designated place (CDP) in Flathead County, Montana

== See also ==
- Martin (disambiguation)
