= Marten River =

Marten River may refer to:

- Marten River (Alberta), a tributary of Lesser Slave Lake in Alberta, Canada
- Marten River (Ontario), a river in Nipissing District, Ontario, Canada
- Marten River, Ontario, a hamlet in Ontario, Canada
- Marten River Provincial Park, Northeastern Ontario, Canada
- Marten River, a locality in Northern Sunrise County, Alberta, Canada

== See also ==
- Marten (disambiguation)
- Marten Creek (disambiguation)
