= Uncle Tetsu =

Japanese bakery chain

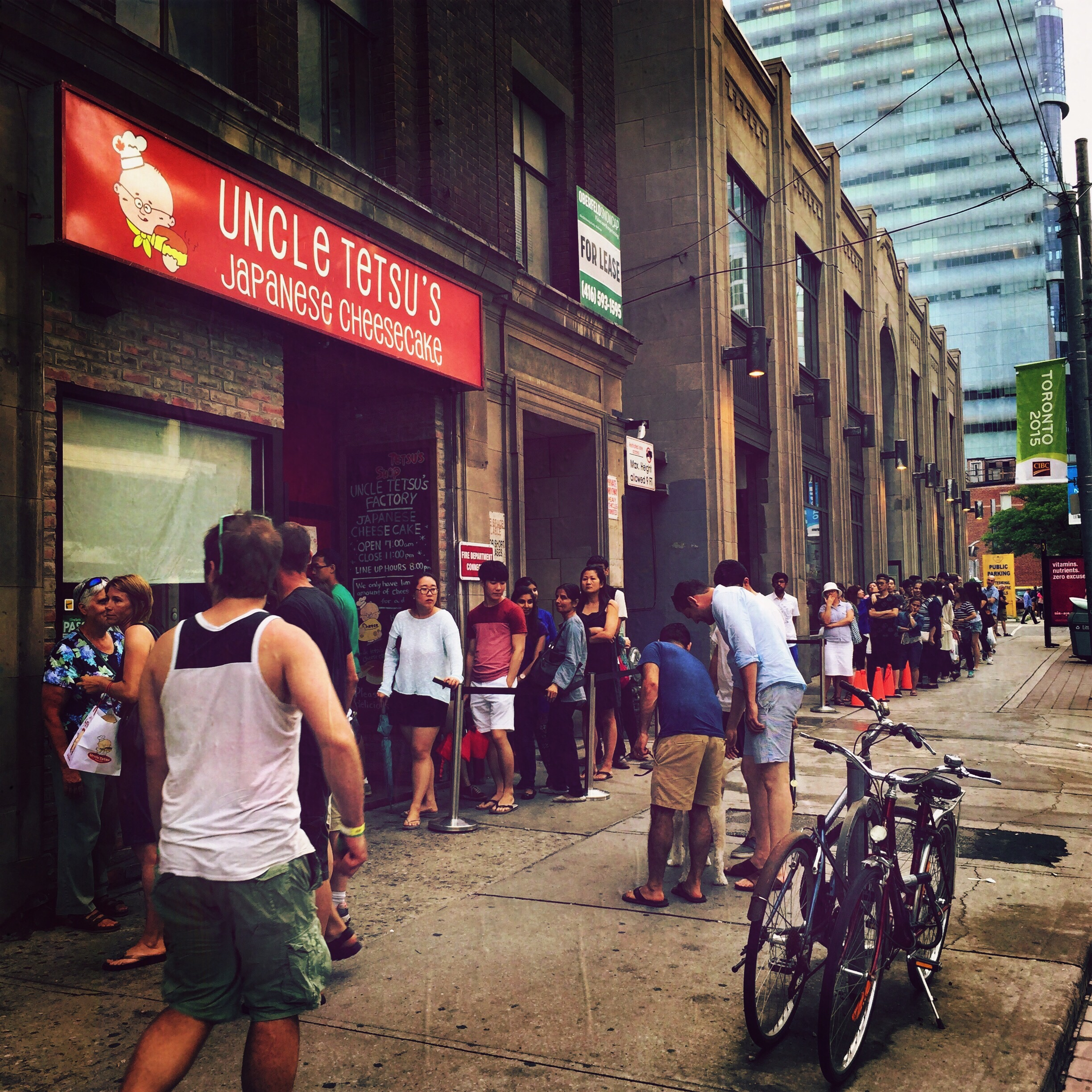
A branch of Uncle Tetsu's in Toronto, Canada (2015)

Uncle Tetsu's Cheesecake (Japanese: てつおじさんの店, Tetsu-ojisan no mise), commonly known as Uncle Tetsu or Uncle Tetsu's, is a Japanese bakery chain that sells cheesecake as its signature dish. It originally opened in Japan in 1990 as a bakery shop on Oyafukou Street in the ward of Hakata-ku in the city of Fukuoka. The founder, Tetsushi Mizokami (溝上 徹思, Mizokami Tetsushi), serves as the namesake for the modern-day global chain.

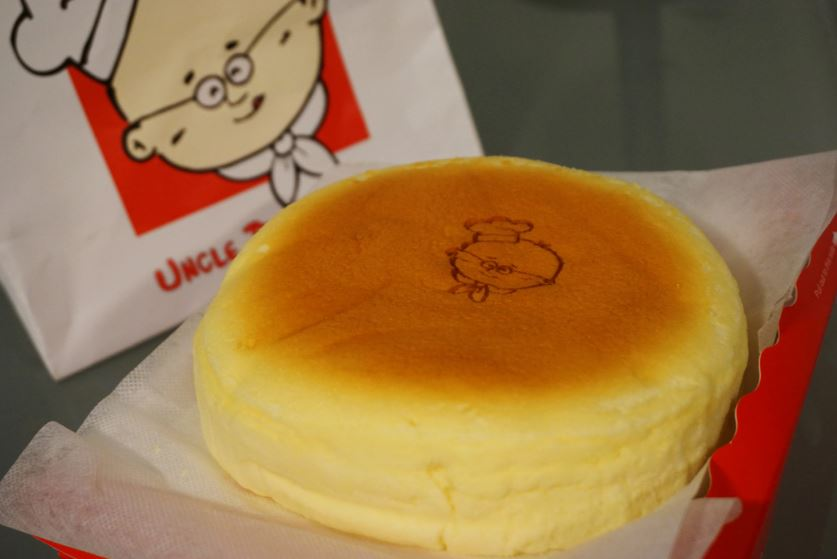
The signature cheesecake from Uncle Tetsu's

An Uncle Tetsu's branch opened in Taiwan in 2011, and the cakes became highly popular after being reported on by local television talk show Kangsi Coming. Uncle Tetsu's entered the Chinese market in 2013, and its products became popular in Shanghai, with customers queueing for hours and purchases being limited to two items per person; because of their widespread popularity, the cheesecakes' sales are limited to one per buyer. There is limited oven capacity, and this makes the line shorter.

The first Uncle Tetsu's outside of Asia opened in 2015, in Toronto, Canada. There are currently 2 outlets in Japan; with 11 in Malaysia, 9 in Indonesia, and 8 in Taiwan. Stores opened in the Australian cities of Sydney and Melbourne in 2016 and late 2017, respectively; and a branch opened in Auckland, New Zealand, around the same time as Melbourne. Other branches of the chain are present across the United States, particularly in the cities of Waikiki, Los Angeles, and San Mateo. There are thirteen stores in Canada, including in the cities of Toronto, Richmond Hill, Markham, Ottawa, Montreal, Calgary, Vancouver, Burnaby, Edmonton, and most recently in Halifax. An Uncle Tetsu's outlet opened in Lahore, Pakistan, in 2019.
