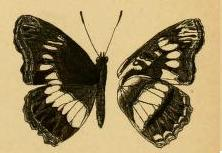
- Pseudathyma sibyllina

Scientific classification
- Domain: Eukaryota
- Kingdom: Animalia
- Phylum: Arthropoda
- Class: Insecta
- Order: Lepidoptera
- Family: Nymphalidae
- Tribe: Adoliadini
- Genus: Pseudathyma; Staudinger, [1891]

Species
- Numerous, see text

= Pseudathyma =

Genus of brush-footed butterflies

Pseudathyma is an Afrotropical genus of brush-footed butterflies called false sergeants.

== Species ==
- Pseudathyma callina (Grose-Smith, 1898) – calline false sergeant
- Pseudathyma cyrili Chovet, 2002
- Pseudathyma endjami Libert, 2002
- Pseudathyma falcata Jackson, 1969 – falcate false sergeant
- Pseudathyma jacksoni Carcasson, 1965
- Pseudathyma legeri Larsen & Boorman, 1995 – St Leger's false sergeant
- Pseudathyma lucretioides Carpenter & Jackson, 1950
- Pseudathyma martini Collins, 2002 – Martin's false sergeant
- Pseudathyma michelae Libert, 2002
- Pseudathyma neptidina Karsch, 1894 – streaked false sergeant
- Pseudathyma nzoia van Someren, 1939 – streaked false sergeant
- Pseudathyma plutonica Butler, 1902
- Pseudathyma sibyllina (Staudinger, 1890) – Sibylline false sergeant
- Pseudathyma uluguru Kielland, 1985
