= Martens (disambiguation) =

The martens constitute the mammal genus Martes within the subfamily Mustelinae, in the family Mustelidae.

Martens may also refer to:

- Martens (surname)
- Dr. Martens or Doc Martens, a brand of shoe

== See also ==
- Martins (disambiguation)
- Marten (disambiguation)
