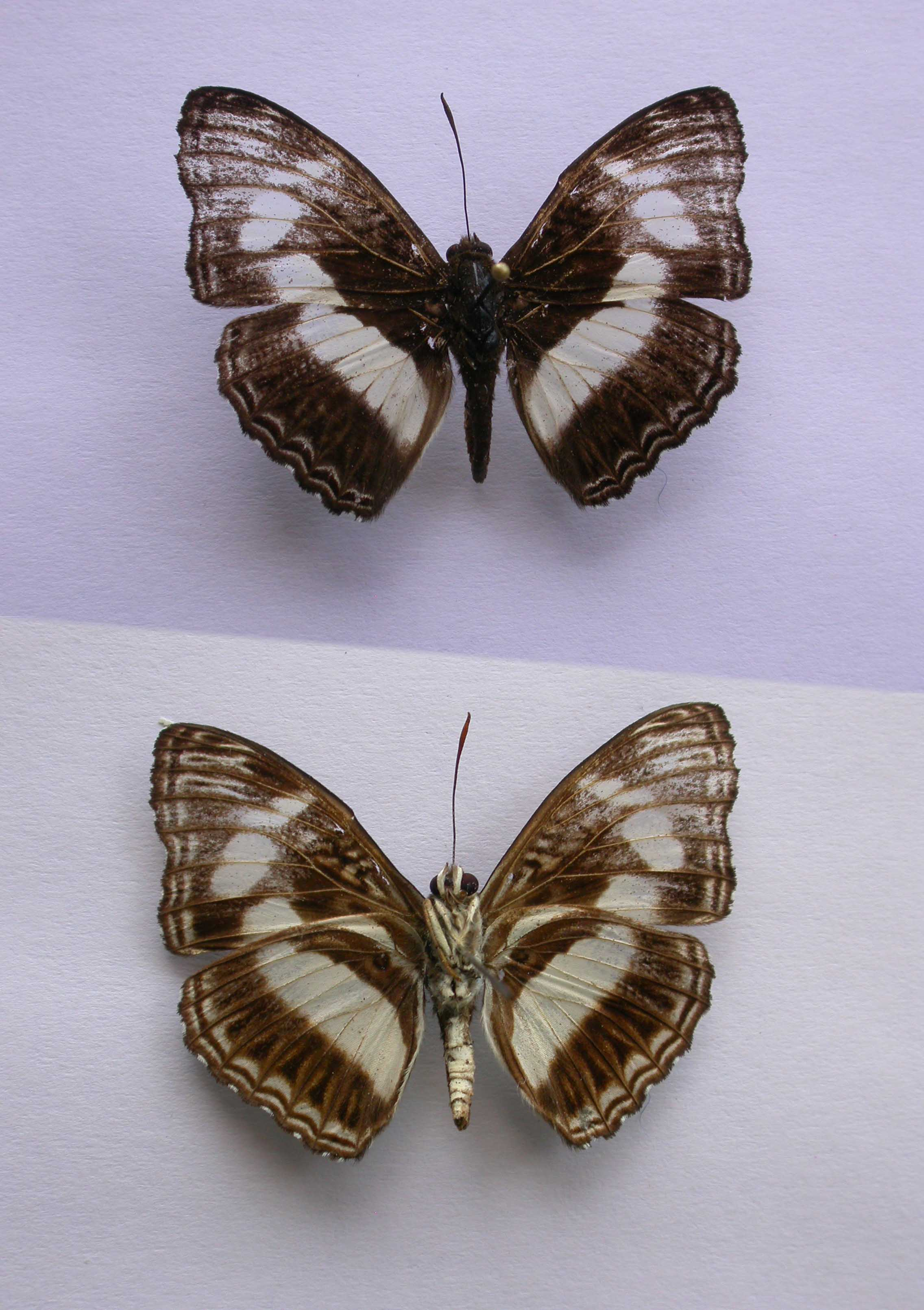

Scientific classification
- Domain: Eukaryota
- Kingdom: Animalia
- Phylum: Arthropoda
- Class: Insecta
- Order: Lepidoptera
- Family: Nymphalidae
- Genus: Pseudathyma
- Species: P. plutonica

Binomial name
- Pseudathyma plutonica Butler, 1902

= Pseudathyma plutonica =

Species of butterfly

Pseudathyma plutonica is a butterfly in the family Nymphalidae. It is found in the Democratic Republic of the Congo, Uganda, Kenya and Tanzania. The habitat consists of forests.

Adults are attracted to fermenting fruit.

== Subspecies ==
- Pseudathyma plutonica plutonica (Democratic Republic of the Congo: Lualaba, Uganda, western Kenya, north-western Tanzania)
- Pseudathyma plutonica expansa Kielland, 1978 (Tanzania)
- Pseudathyma plutonica shaba Chovet, 2002 (Democratic Republic of the Congo)
