= Pseudathyma michelae =

Scientific classification
- Domain: Eukaryota
- Kingdom: Animalia
- Phylum: Arthropoda
- Class: Insecta
- Order: Lepidoptera
- Family: Nymphalidae
- Genus: Pseudathyma
- Species: P. michelae

Binomial name
- Pseudathyma michelae Libert, 2002

Species of butterfly

Pseudathyma michelae is a butterfly in the family Nymphalidae. It is found in Cameroon, the Central African Republic, Gabon, the Republic of the Congo and the Democratic Republic of the Congo.
