= Pseudathyma nzoia =

Streaked false sergeant

Conservation status
- Endangered (IUCN 3.1)

Scientific classification
- Kingdom: Animalia
- Phylum: Arthropoda
- Clade: Pancrustacea
- Class: Insecta
- Order: Lepidoptera
- Family: Nymphalidae
- Genus: Pseudathyma
- Species: P. nzoia

Binomial name
- Pseudathyma nzoia Van Someren, 1939

Species of butterfly

Pseudathyma nzoia, commonly known as the streaked false sergeant, is a butterfly in the family Nymphalidae. It is an endangered species endemic to Kenya.
