= Pseudathyma endjami =

Scientific classification
- Domain: Eukaryota
- Kingdom: Animalia
- Phylum: Arthropoda
- Class: Insecta
- Order: Lepidoptera
- Family: Nymphalidae
- Genus: Pseudathyma
- Species: P. endjami

Binomial name
- Pseudathyma endjami Libert, 2002

Species of butterfly

Pseudathyma endjami is a butterfly in the family Nymphalidae. It is found in Cameroon, the Central African Republic and the Democratic Republic of the Congo.
