= Pseudathyma falcata =

Falcate false sergeant

Scientific classification
- Kingdom: Animalia
- Phylum: Arthropoda
- Clade: Pancrustacea
- Class: Insecta
- Order: Lepidoptera
- Family: Nymphalidae
- Genus: Pseudathyma
- Species: P. falcata

Binomial name
- Pseudathyma falcata Jackson, 1969

Synonyms
- Pseudathyma jocqueana Hecq, 1990

Species of butterfly

Pseudathyma falcata, the falcate false sergeant, is a butterfly in the family Nymphalidae. It is found in Guinea, Ivory Coast, Ghana, Togo, and western Nigeria. The habitat consists of forests.

Adult males mud-puddle.

Torben Larsen developed a species numbering system for his 2005 publication Butterflies of West Africa. This species is #1133. The 'Larsen' numbers have since been used with permission in A Sharp Eye on Butterflies of Ghana.
