= Marton =

Marton may refer to:

== Places ==
=== England ===
- Marton, Blackpool, district of Blackpool, Lancashire
- Marton, Bridlington, area of Bridlington in the East Riding of Yorkshire
- Marton, Cheshire, village and civil parish in Cheshire
- Marton, Cumbria, village in Cumbria
- Marton, East Riding of Yorkshire, hamlet in the East Riding of Yorkshire
- Marton, Harrogate, village in North Yorkshire
- Marton, Lincolnshire, village in Lincolnshire
- Marton, Middlesbrough, suburb of Middlesbrough
- Marton, Myddle, Broughton and Harmer Hill, a location in Shropshire
- Marton, Ryedale, village in North Yorkshire
- Marton, Shropshire or Marton-in-Chirbury, village in Shropshire
- Marton, Warwickshire, village in Warwickshire
- Marton-in-the-Forest, North Yorkshire
- Marton-le-Moor, village in North Yorkshire
- Long Marton, parish of Westmorland and Furness, Cumbria
- Whitegate and Marton, parish of Vale Royal, Cheshire

=== Elsewhere ===
- Marton, New Zealand, town in the Manawatū-Whanganui region
- Marton, Queensland, town in the Shire of Cook, Queensland, Australia

== Other uses ==
- Marton (name)
- MV Marton, a British coaster

== See also ==
- Marten (disambiguation)
- Martin (name), a given name and a surname
