= Pseudathyma martini =

Martin's false sergeant

Scientific classification
- Domain: Eukaryota
- Kingdom: Animalia
- Phylum: Arthropoda
- Class: Insecta
- Order: Lepidoptera
- Family: Nymphalidae
- Genus: Pseudathyma
- Species: P. martini

Binomial name
- Pseudathyma martini Collins, 2002

Species of butterfly

Pseudathyma martini, or Martin's false sergeant, is a butterfly in the family Nymphalidae. It is found in Ivory Coast, Ghana, Nigeria, and the Republic of the Congo. The habitat consists of forests.
