= Martin Creek (Hiwassee River tributary) =

Stream in North Carolina, USA

Martin Creek Tributary to Hiawassee River
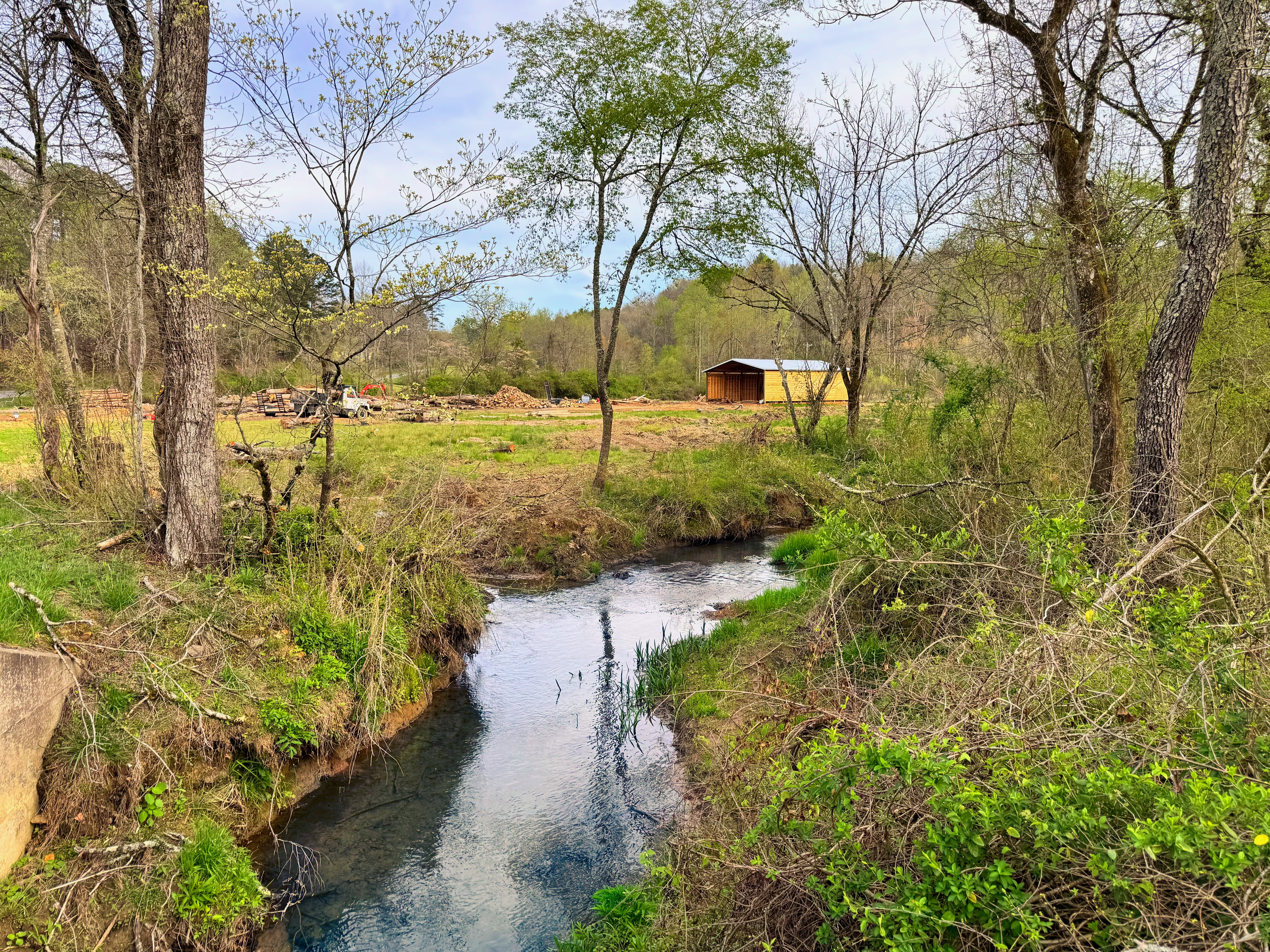

- Location of Martin Creek mouth Martin Creek (Hiwassee River tributary) (the United States)

Location
- Country: United States
- State: North Carolina
- County: Cherokee

Physical characteristics
- Source: Cane Creek divide
  - location: East side of Mary King Mountain
  - coordinates: 35°01′13″N 084°03′52″W
  - elevation: 1,940 ft (590 m)
- Mouth: Hiawassee River
  - location: about 0.5 miles east of Murphy, North Carolina
  - coordinates: 35°04′34″N 084°01′19″W
  - elevation: 1,530 ft (470 m)
- Length: 8.82 mi (14.19 km)
- Basin size: 9.06 square miles (23.5 km^{2})
- Discharge
  - location: Hiawassee River
  - average: 19.16 cu ft/s (0.543 m^{3}/s) at mouth with Hiawassee River

Basin features
- Progression: generally north
- River system: Hiawassee River
- Tributaries
  - left: Right Prong
  - right: Hughes Hollow; Mag Ashe Branch
- Bridges: Windy Ridge Lane, Judd HL, Martins Creek Road, Hughes Road, Martins Creek Road, Tobe Stalcup Road, Brasstown Road, Martins Creek Road, Wilson Phillips Drive, Crisp Road, Wildcat Drive, Kaitlan Lane, Martins Creek Road, Crews Cove Road, US 64, Harshaw Road

Martin Creek is a stream in the U.S. state of North Carolina. It is a tributary to the Hiwassee River.

Martin Creek was named after the pioneer Martin family, which settled near its banks in the 1830s. The Martin's Creek community is named after the stream, which runs through it.

== Course ==
Martin Creek rises on the east side of Mary King Mountain in Cherokee County, North Carolina and then follows a northerly course to join the Hiawassee River about 0.5 miles east of Murphy, North Carolina.

== Watershed ==
Martin Creek drains 9.06 square miles (23.5 km^{2}) of area, receives about 58.9 in/year of precipitation, and has a wetness index of 281.47 and is about 77% forested.
