= Martin's Mill Covered Bridge =

Martin's Mill Covered Bridge may refer to:

- Martin's Mill Covered Bridge (Antrim Township, Franklin County, Pennsylvania)
- Bitzer's Mill Covered Bridge or Martin's Mill Bridge, a bridge in Lancaster County, Pennsylvania, United States
- Martin's Mill Covered Bridge (Marianna, Pennsylvania)
- Martin's Mill Covered Bridge (Hartland, Vermont)
