= Martins Run =

Stream in Ohio, U.S.

Coordinates: 39°18′12″N 84°05′59″W

Martins Run (also called Martin Run) is a stream in the U.S. state of Ohio.

Martins Run was named after John Martin, a pioneer citizen. Martins Run is one of many streams in Warren County bearing the name of an early settler.
