= IV District, Turku =

City district in Turku, Finland

Coordinates: 60°26′26″N 22°15′20″E

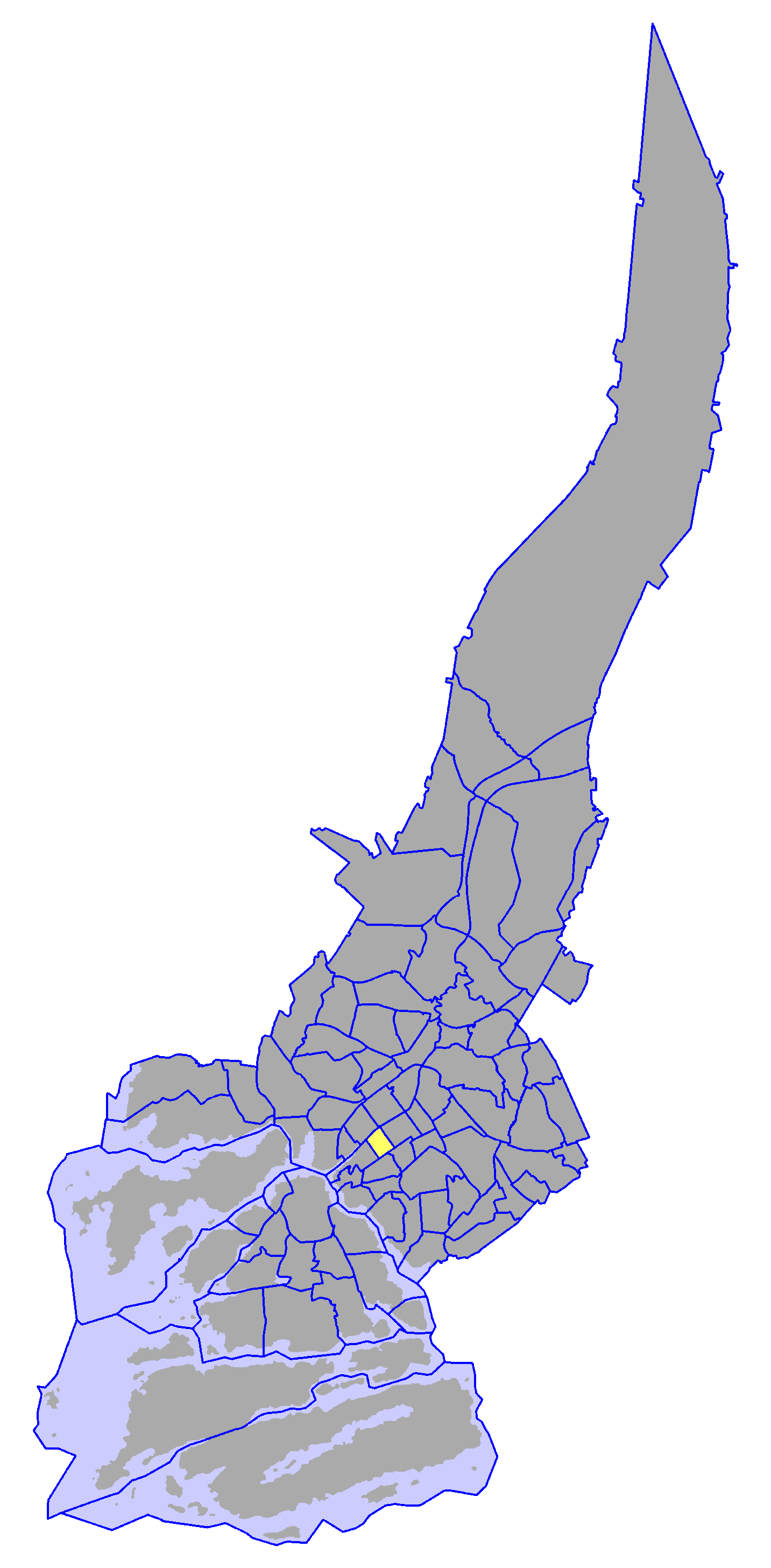
The IV District on a map of Turku.

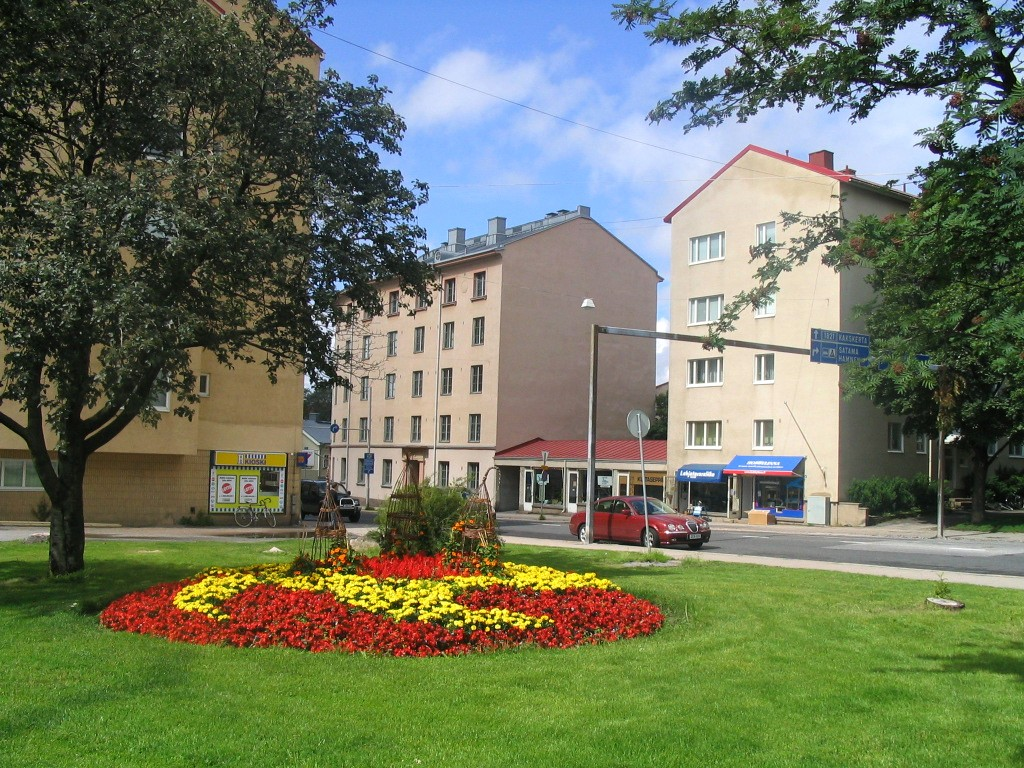
A park in Martti.

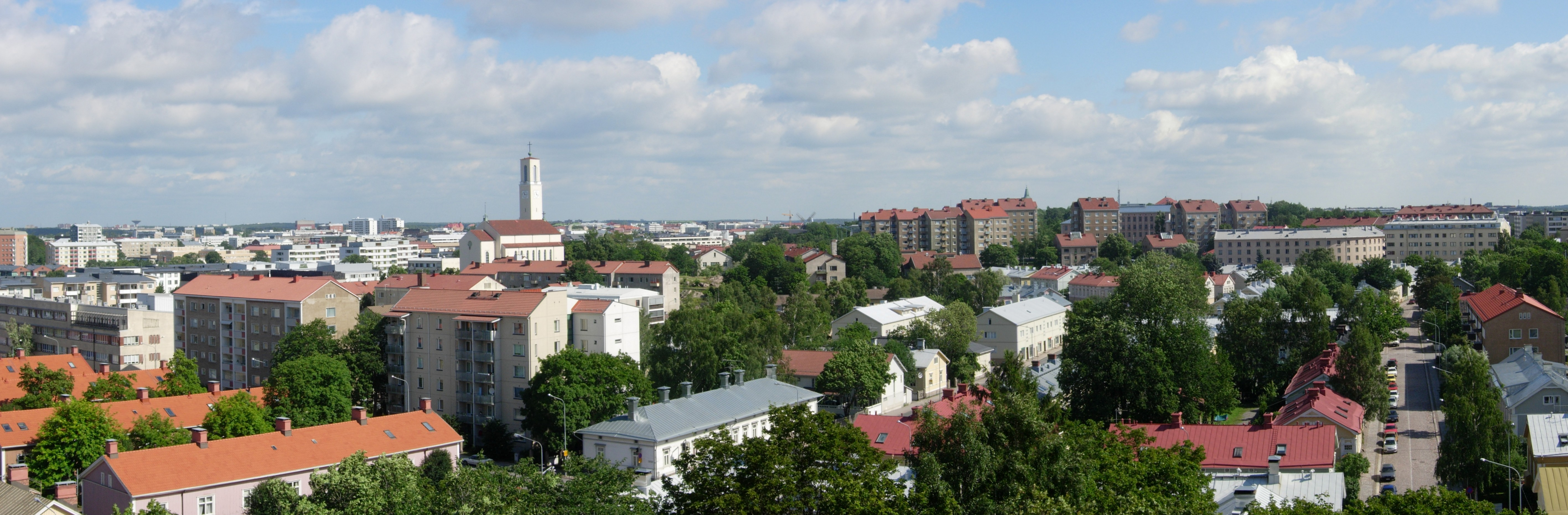
View over Martti.

The IV District, also known as Martti (Finnish; Martinsbacken in Swedish), is one of the central districts of Turku, Finland. It is located on the east side of the river Aura, between Tervahovinkatu in the west and Betaniankatu and Martinkatu in the east. The district is one of the smallest in Turku, and is centred on the Martinkirkko church, named after the reformer Martin Luther (Martti Luther in Finnish). Martti is also one of the most expensive areas to live in Turku.

The district is rather densely populated, and has a population of 4,357 (as of 2004) and an annual population growth rate of -0.46%. 7.16% of the district's population are under 15 years old, while 18.80% are over 65. The district's linguistic makeup is 90.22% Finnish, 8.40% Swedish, and 1.38% other.

== See also ==
- Districts of Turku
- Districts of Turku by population
