= Japanese cheesecake =

Light sponge cake with cream cheese

Japanese cheesecake スフレチーズケーキ
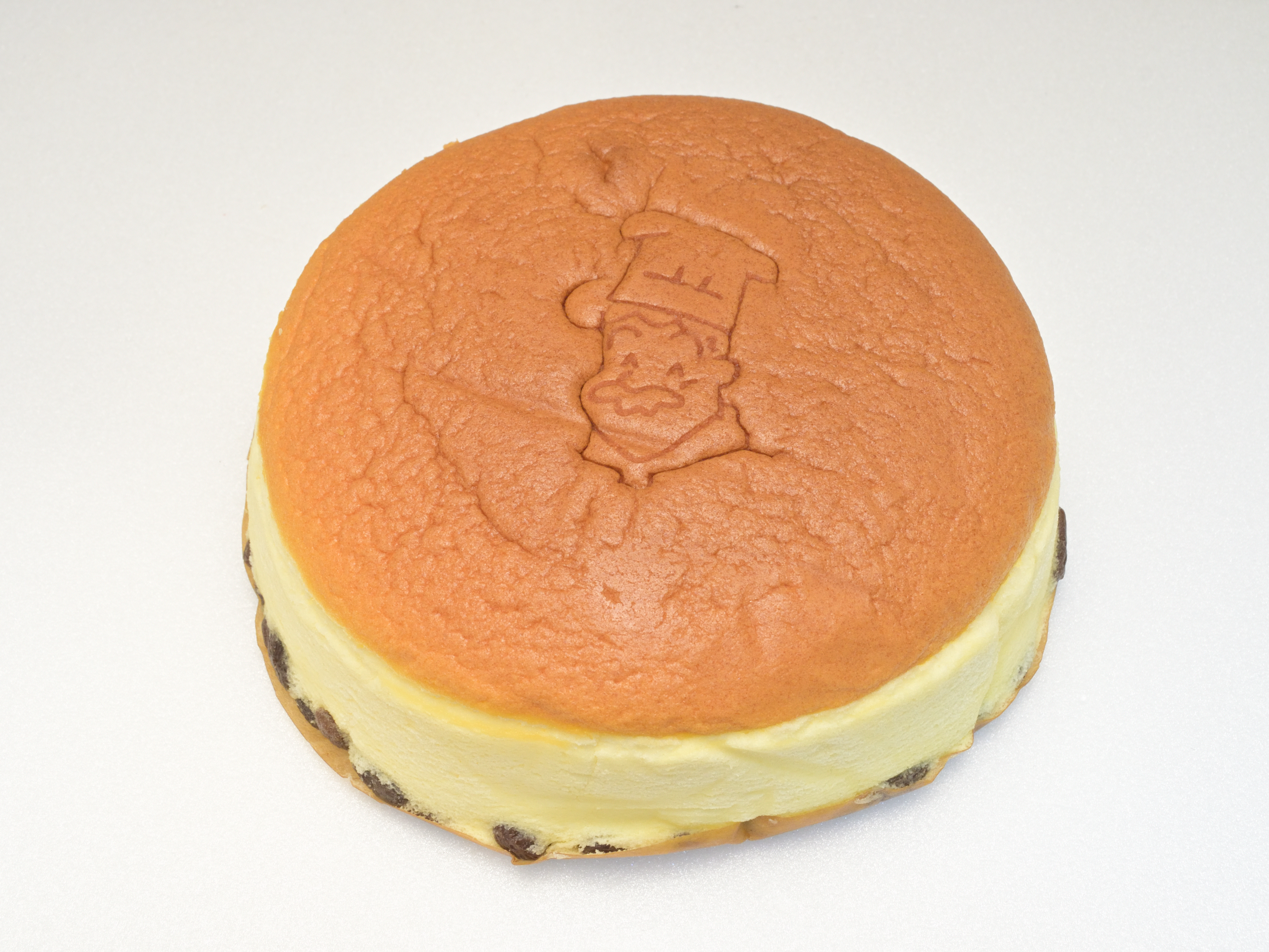
- A Japanese cheesecake from Uncle Rikuro's
- Alternative names: Soufflé-style cheesecake, cotton cheesecake, light cheesecake
- Course: Dessert
- Place of origin: Japan
- Created by: Tomotaro Kuzuno
- Main ingredients: Cream cheese, butter, sugar, eggs

Japanese cheesecake (Japanese: スフレチーズケーキ), also known as soufflé-style cheesecake, cotton cheesecake, or light cheesecake, is a variety of cheesecake that is usually lighter in texture and less sweet than North American varieties. It has a characteristically wobbly and airy texture similar to a soufflé when fresh out of the oven and a chiffon cake-like texture when chilled.

== History ==
The recipe was created by Japanese chef Tomotaro Kuzuno, who was inspired by a local käsekuchen cheesecake (a German variant) during a trip to Berlin in the 1960s. It is less sweet and has fewer calories than standard Western-style cheesecakes, containing less cheese and sugar. The cake is made with cream cheese, butter, sugar, and eggs. Similar to chiffon cake or soufflé, Japanese cheesecake has a fluffy texture produced by whipping egg white and egg yolk separately. It is traditionally made in a bain-marie. The cake is the signature dish of Uncle Tetsu's Cheesecake, a Japanese bakery chain which originated in Hakata-ku, Fukuoka, in 1947.

== Gallery ==
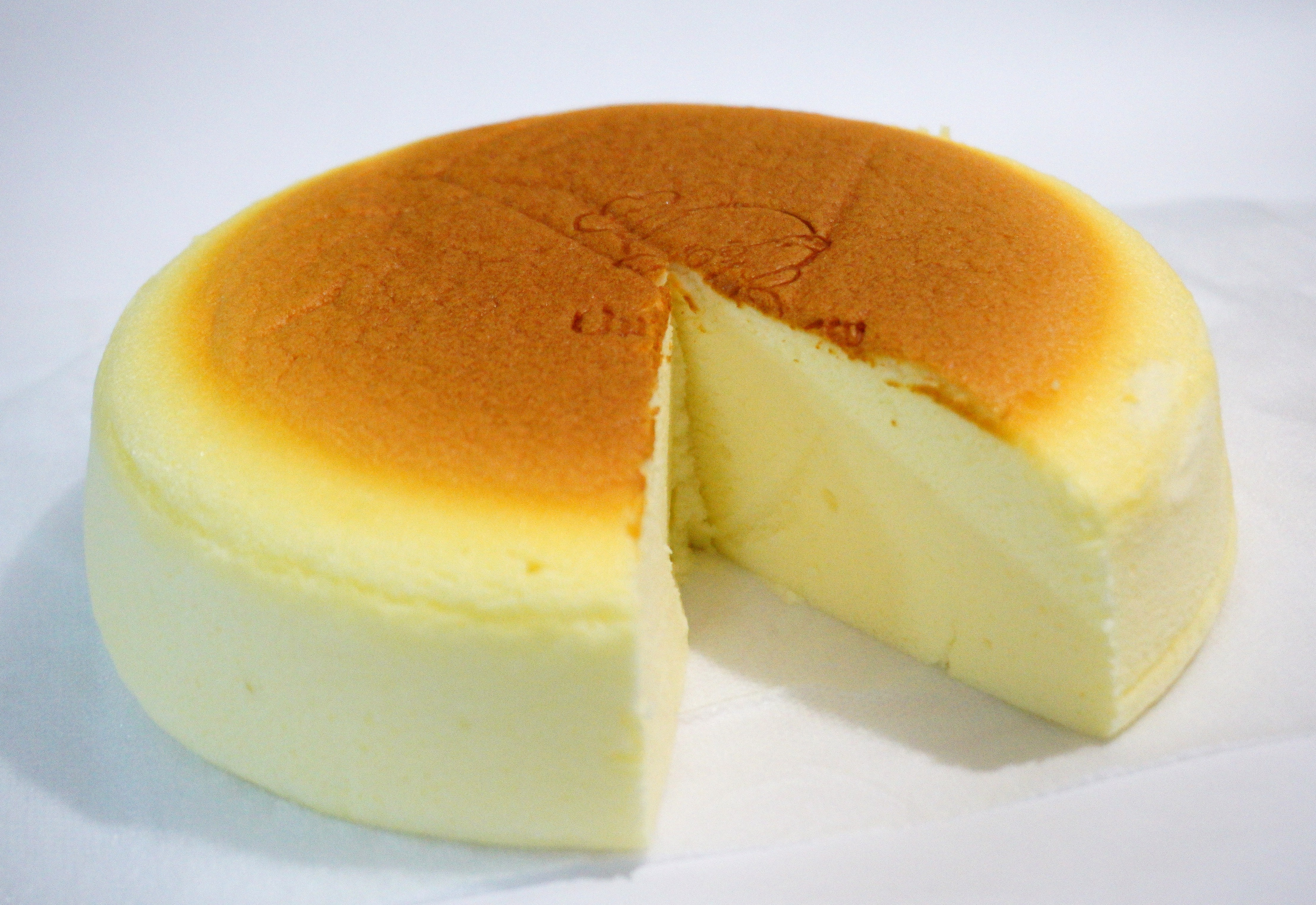

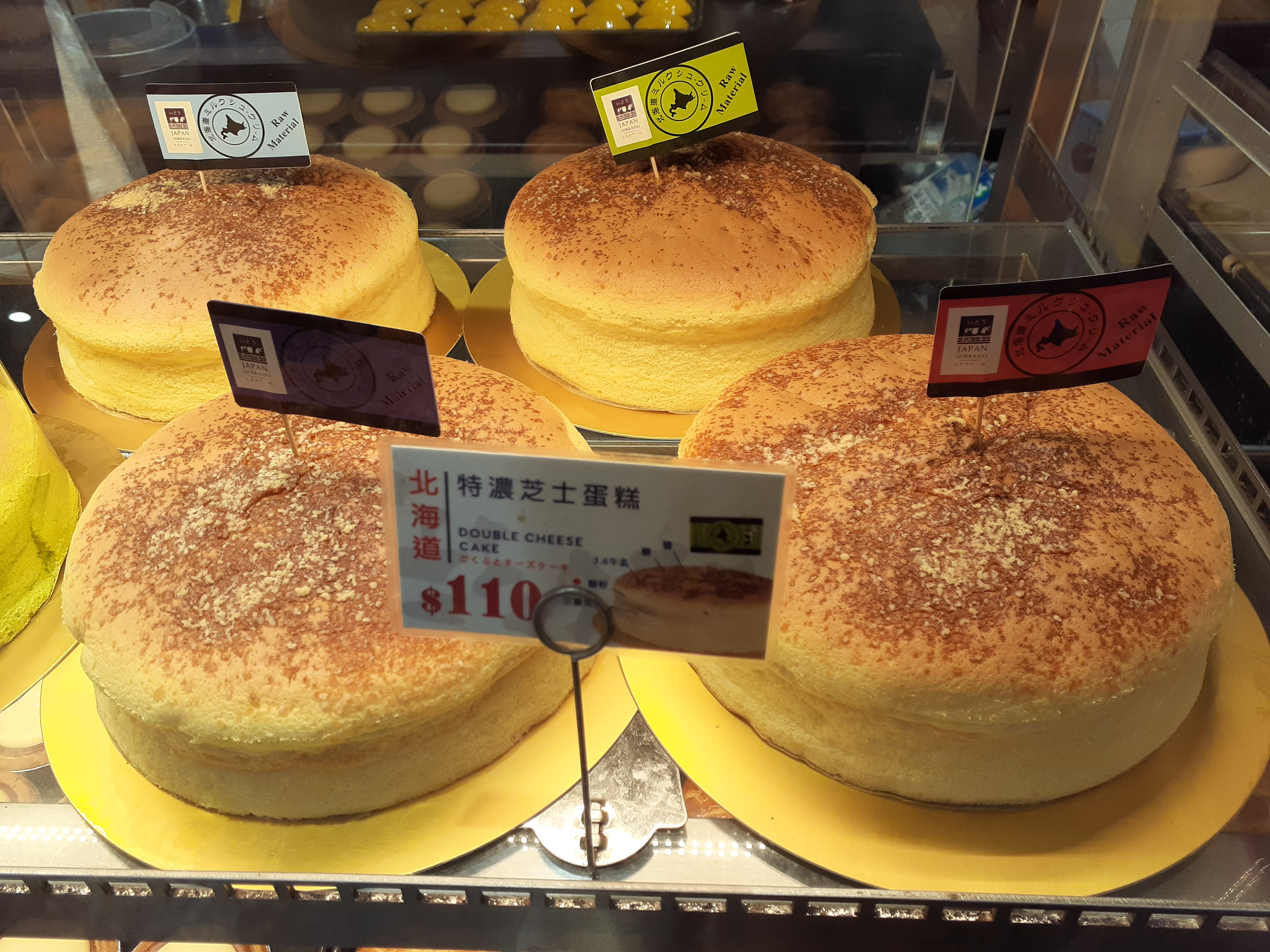

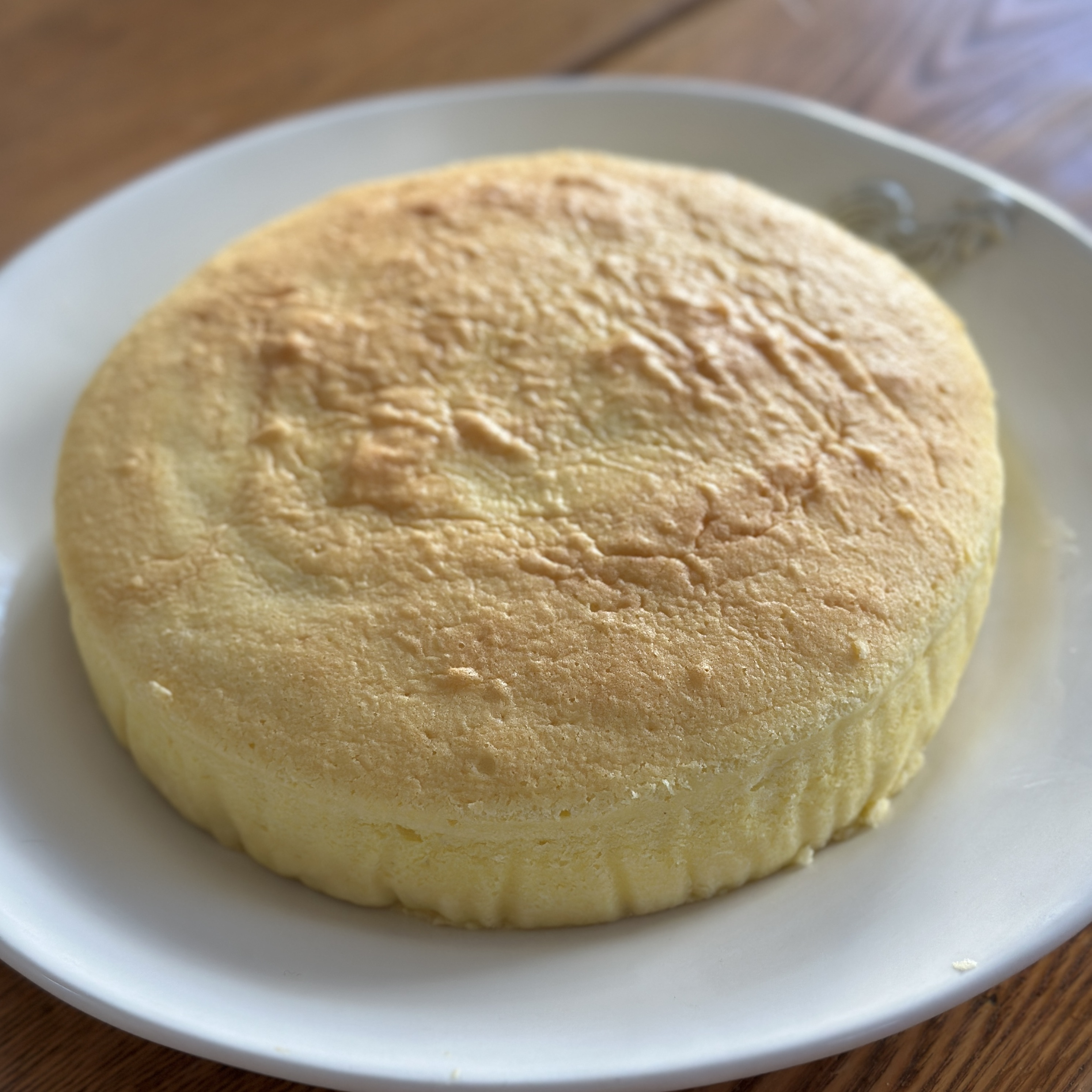

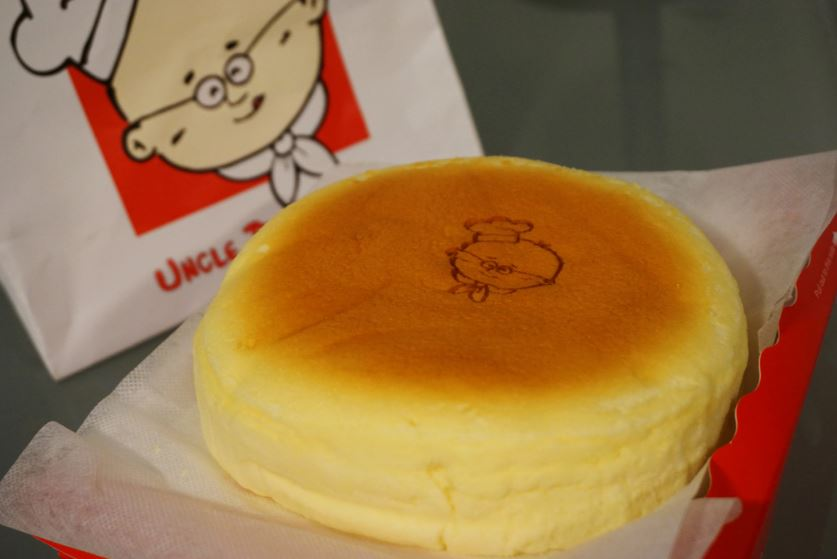
Uncle Tetsu's Cheesecake

== See also ==
- List of cakes
- Sponge cake
- Japanese cuisine
