= Martine (disambiguation) =

Martine is a feminine given name and a surname.

Martine may also refer to:

- Mount Martine, Palmer Land, Antarctica
- Martine, a 1922 play by Jean-Jacques Bernard
- Martine (1952 film), a British television play
- Martine (1961 film), an Australian television play based on Bernard's play
- Martine, a sculpture by Olivier Seguin created for the Ruta de la Amistad in Mexico City
