= Martins Pond Site =

Coordinates: 39.0109°N 76.5247°W

- U.S. National Register of Historic Places
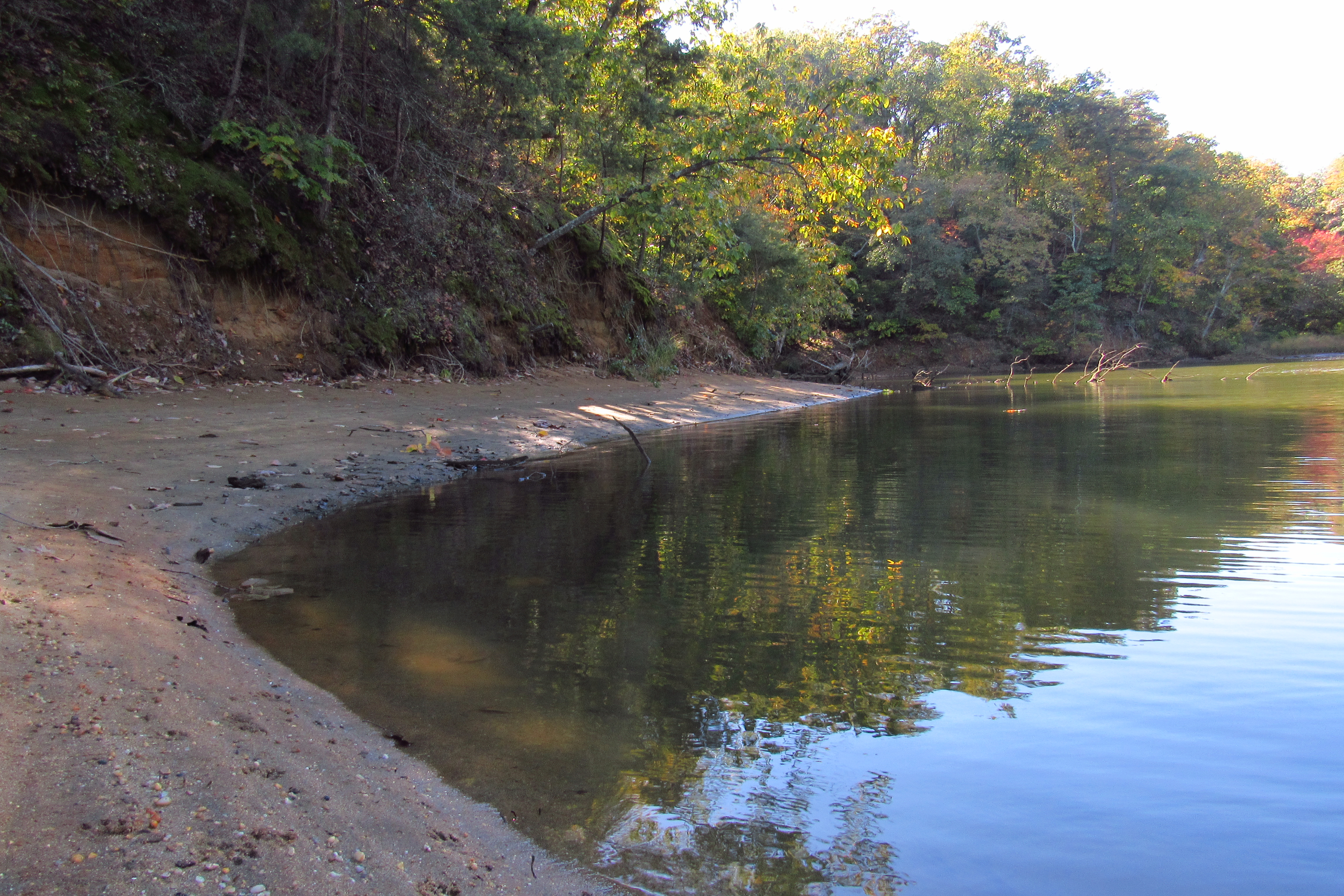
- South view of Martins Pond

- Location within Maryland Location within the United States
- Nearest city: Annapolis, Maryland
- NRHP reference No.: 75000862
- Added to NRHP: June 05, 1975

The Martins Pond Archeological Site is an archaeological site near Annapolis in Anne Arundel County, Maryland. It is a Middle-Late Woodland period site, with lithic, floral, and faunal remains.

It was listed on the National Register of Historic Places in 1975.

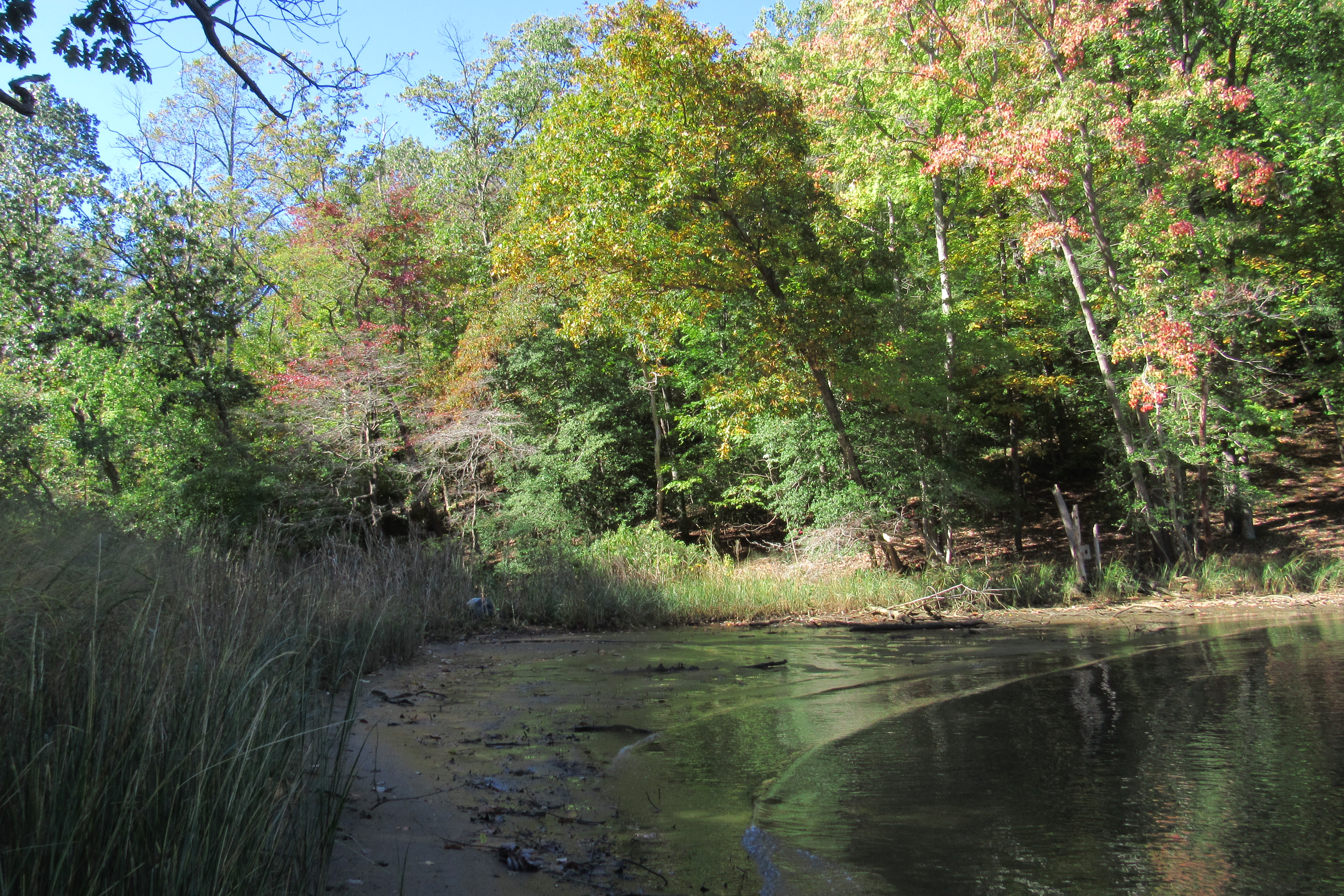
West view of Martins Pond
