= Martins Creek, North Carolina =

Unincorporated community in North Carolina, United States

Coordinates: 35°01′30″N 84°01′51″W

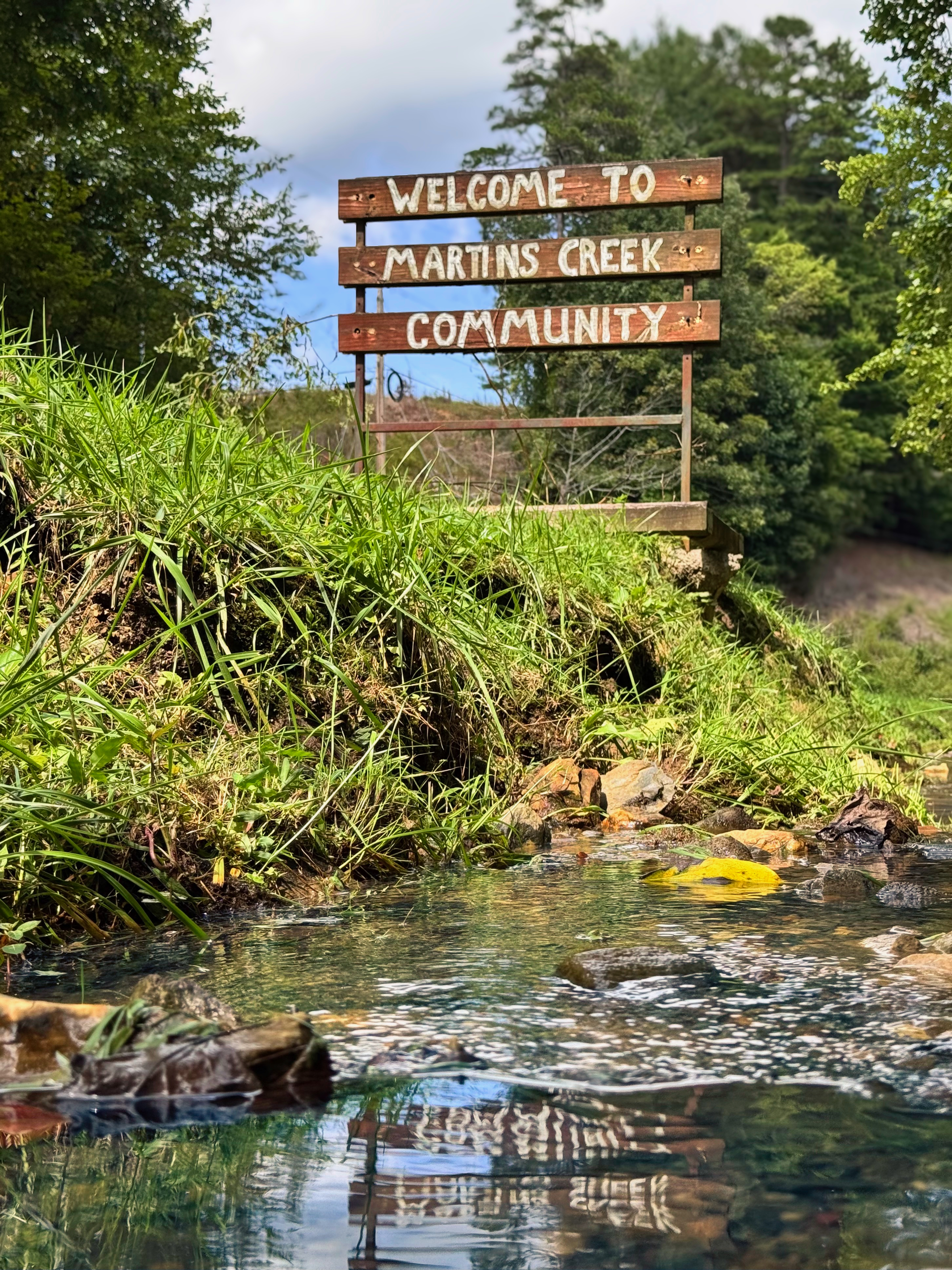
Martins Creek welcome sign

Martins Creek is an unincorporated community in Cherokee County, in the U.S. state of North Carolina.

== History ==
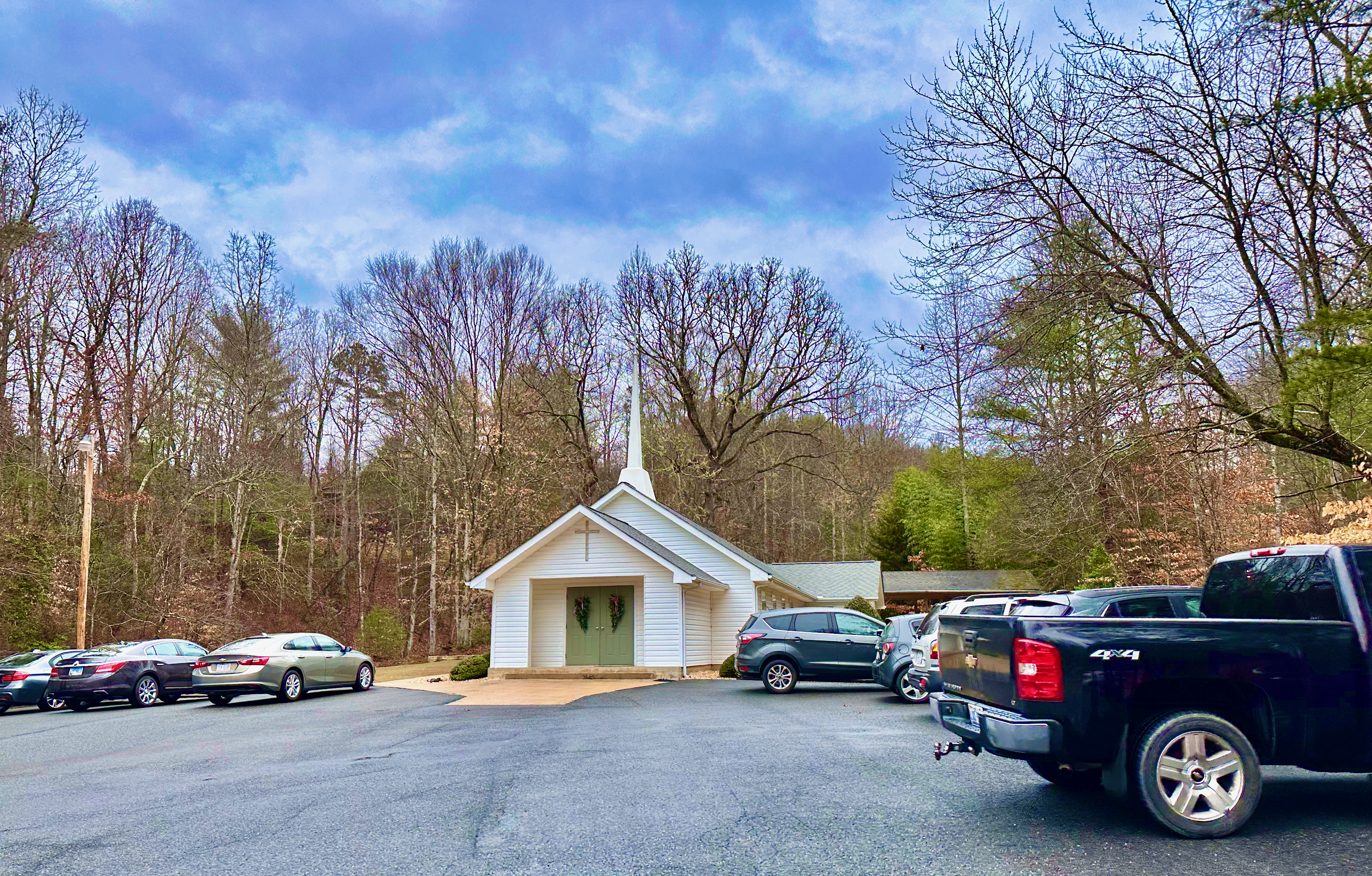
Martins Creek Community Church, established in 1860, pictured in 2023

The community takes its name from nearby Martin Creek. Martins Creek Community Church, built in 1860, was destroyed during a battle in the Civil War. The church has been rebuilt three times since. The Martins Creek School was built in 1929 and a new cafeteria was constructed in 1957. The Martins Creek Community Center was built in 1976. Martins Creek School's classroom building was destroyed by fire around 1993 and classes were held at the community center until the school was rebuilt. The 1957 cafeteria facility later became the Mountain Youth School.

== Education ==
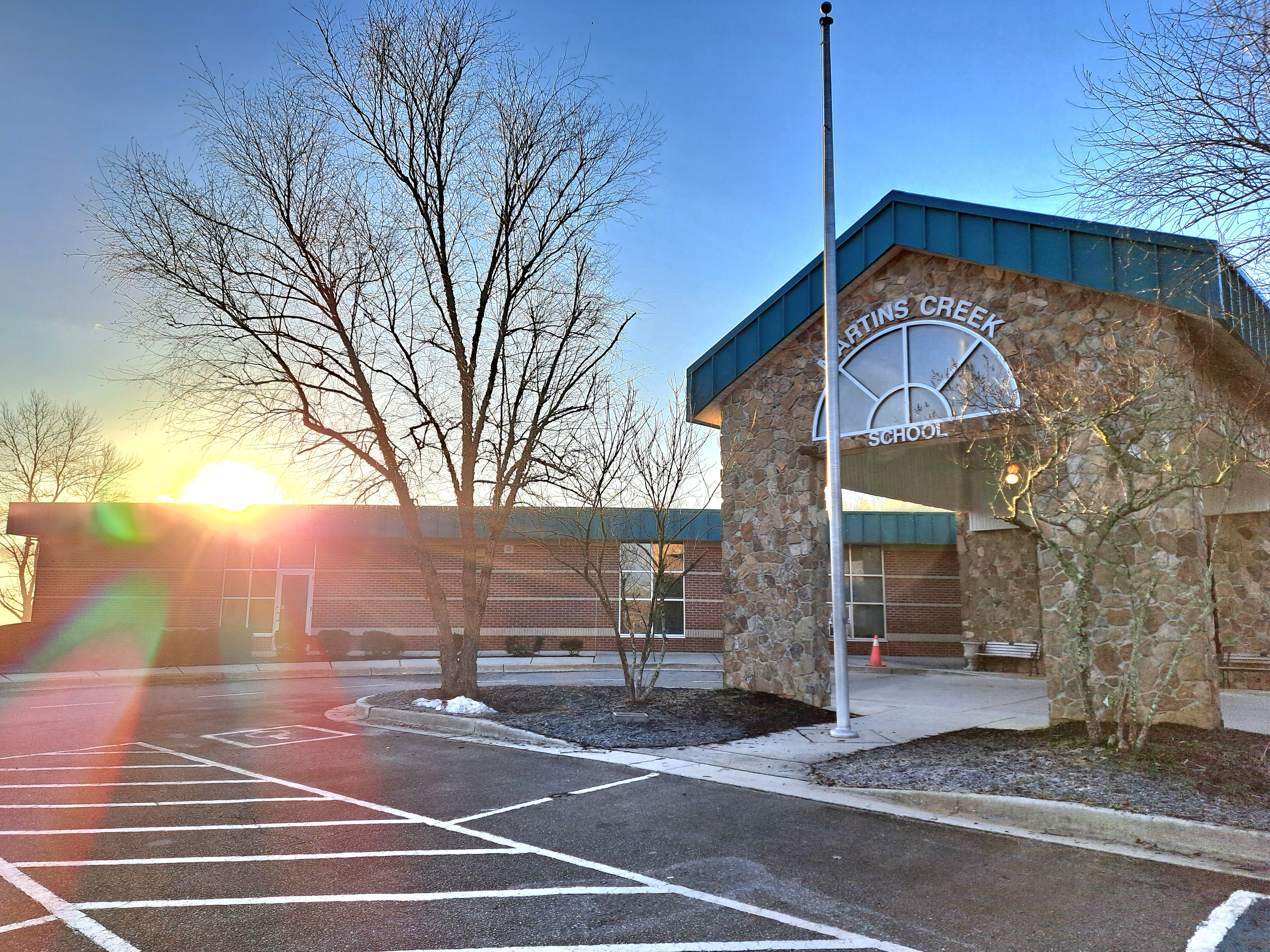
Martins Creek School's current campus opened in 1997.

Martins Creek Elementary School, part of Cherokee County Schools, serves grades K-5 and has an enrollment of 122. The current school building was constructed in 1997. The school's 61-acre campus includes hiking trails and mountain biking trails. The school served grades K-8 until 2024 when its middle school was closed and its 54 remaining students were sent to Murphy Middle School in nearby Murphy. The school has received numerous awards, including being in the top 25 Schools of Excellence in the North Carolina ABC program and being listed in PC Magazine's Top 100 Wired Schools in the nation.

Higher education is offered at Tri-County Community College. Other nearby colleges and universities include North Georgia Technical College, Young Harris College, Southwestern Community College, Western Carolina University, and the University of North Georgia.

The John C. Campbell Folk School, the oldest and largest folk school in the United States, is located about 4 miles (6.4 km) northeast in nearby Brasstown. The folk school offers community concerts and dance entertainment and focuses on creative folk arts for all ages.
