= Martin Creek (Larabee Creek tributary) =

Stream in Humboldt County, California, U.S.

Coordinates: 40°21′57″N 123°44′09″W

Martin Creek is a stream in Humboldt County, California. It is a tributary of Larabee Creek.

Martin Creek was named for a pioneer settler.

== See also ==
- List of rivers of California
