= Martin Township =

Martin Township may refer to:

== Arkansas ==
- Martin Township, Conway County, Arkansas, in Conway County, Arkansas
- Martin Township, Pope County, Arkansas

== Illinois ==
- Martin Township, Crawford County, Illinois
- Martin Township, McLean County, Illinois

== Kansas ==
- Martin Township, Smith County, Kansas, in Smith County, Kansas

== Michigan ==
- Martin Township, Michigan

== Minnesota ==
- Martin Township, Rock County, Minnesota

== Nebraska ==
- Martin Township, Hall County, Nebraska, in Hall County, Nebraska

== North Dakota ==
- Martin Township, Sheridan County, North Dakota, in Sheridan County, North Dakota
- Martin Township, Walsh County, North Dakota

== South Dakota ==
- Martin Township, Perkins County, South Dakota, in Perkins County, South Dakota
