= Martins Soares =

Brazilian municipality located in the state of Minas Gerais

Coordinates: 20°15′25″S 41°52′37″W

- Municipality
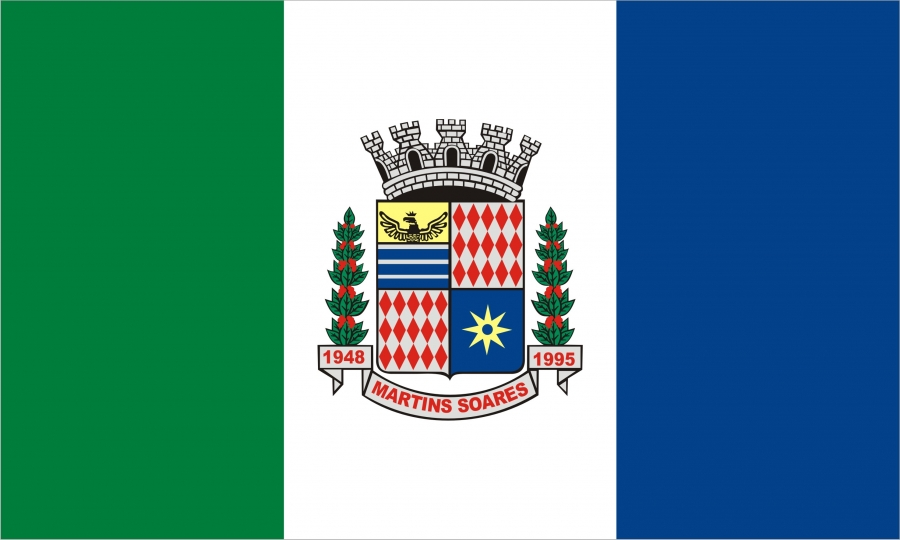
- Flag
- Interactive map of Martins Soares
- Country: Brazil
- State: Minas Gerais
- Region: Southeast
- Time zone: UTC−3 (BRT)

Location of Martins Soares within Minas Gerais

Martins Soares is a Brazilian municipality located in the state of Minas Gerais. The city belongs to the mesoregion of Zona da Mata and to the microregion of Manhuaçu. As of 2020, the estimated population was 8,531.

== See also ==
- List of municipalities in Minas Gerais
