= Martin's Mill Independent School District =

School district in Texas

Location
- Martin's Mill, TX ESC Region 7 USA

District information
- Type: Public
- Grades: Pre-K through 12
- Superintendent: Derek Driver

Students and staff
- Athletic conference: UIL Class 2A (non-football member)
- Colors: Maroon and White

Other information
- Mascot: Mustang
- Website: Martin's Mill ISD

Martin's Mill Independent School District is a public school district based in the community of Martin's Mill, Texas (USA).

There are two campuses in Martin's Mill ISD -

- Martin's Mill Junior/Senior High School (Grades 7-12)
- Martin's Mill Elementary (Grades PK-6).

For the 2022–23 school year, the district was rated by the Texas Education Agency as follows: 74 (C) overall, 76 (C) for Student Achievement, 72 (C) for School Progress, and 70 (C) for Closing the Gaps.
