= Martin's Church =

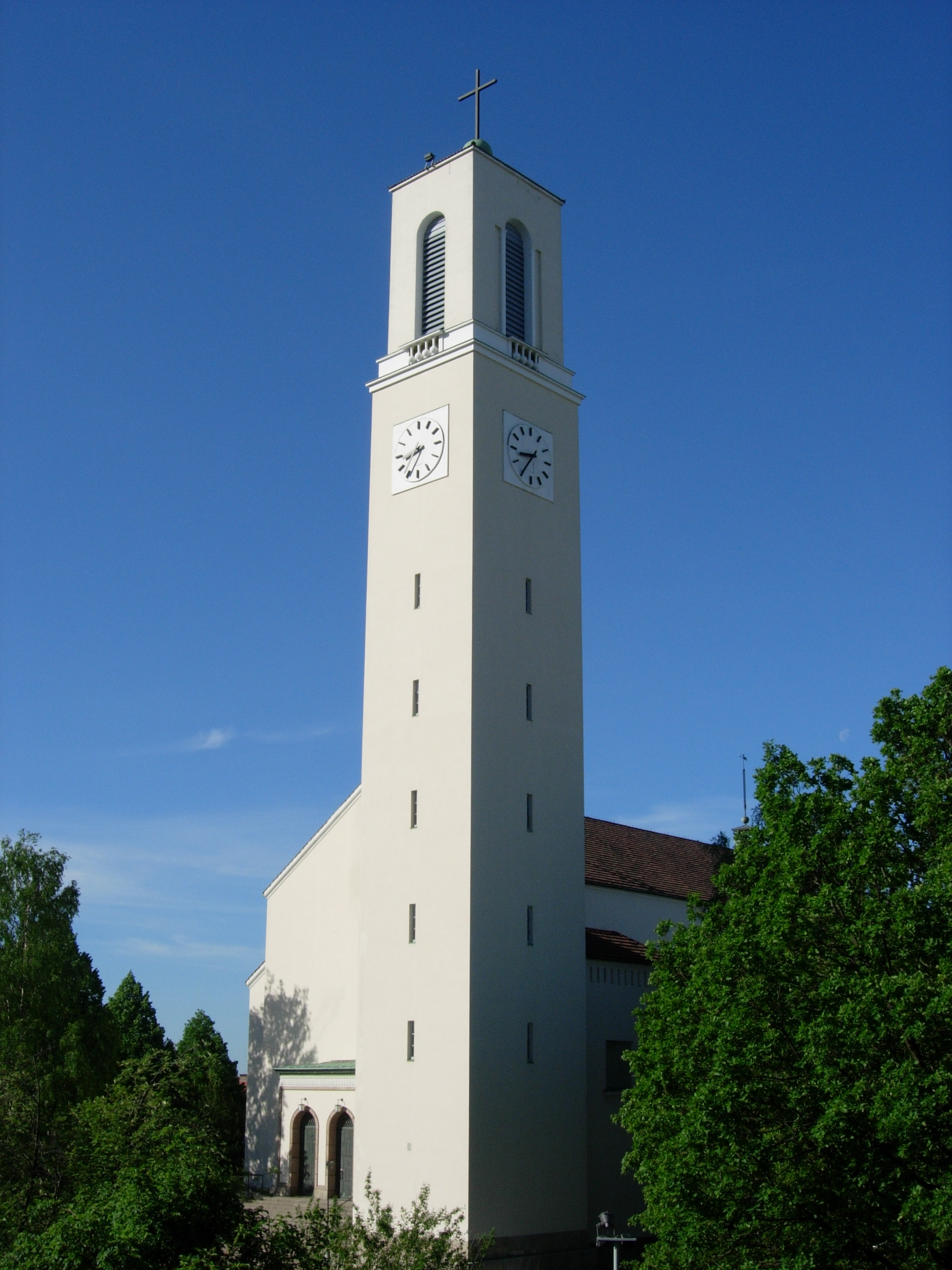
- Martin's Church
- 60°26′27″N 022°15′16″E
- Location: Turku
- Country: Finland
- Denomination: Evangelical Lutheran
- Website: Official website

History
- Status: Completed
- Dedication: Martin Luther
- Consecrated: November 12, 1933

Architecture
- Architect(s): Totti Sora and Gunnar Wahlroos
- Architectural type: Functionalism
- Completed: 1933

Specifications
- Height: 64 m (210 ft)

Martin's Church (Finnish: Martinkirkko, Swedish: Martinskyrkan) in Turku, Finland, is the main church of Martin's parish, founded in 1921. The church was consecrated on the 450th anniversary of the birth of Martin Luther, on November 12, 1933. The designers of the church were the architects Totti Sora and Gunnar Wahlroos. The church represents architectural functionalism. Martin's church is a long church with three aisles with very narrow side aisles. The church has a functional and singular practicality of its own. The barrel-vaulting of the roof is one of the most outstanding features of the church. The altar, the pulpit, and the roof are notable features of architect Sora's work. On the top of the pulpit, the architect has placed a crown. The same theme is featured as a decoration to the hymn list table. The architects have clearly thought of the church as a royal court chamber and for this reason the basic construction is reminiscent of a basilica. The artist Aarre Aaltonen has made five decorative sculptures for the pulpit.

== Art works ==
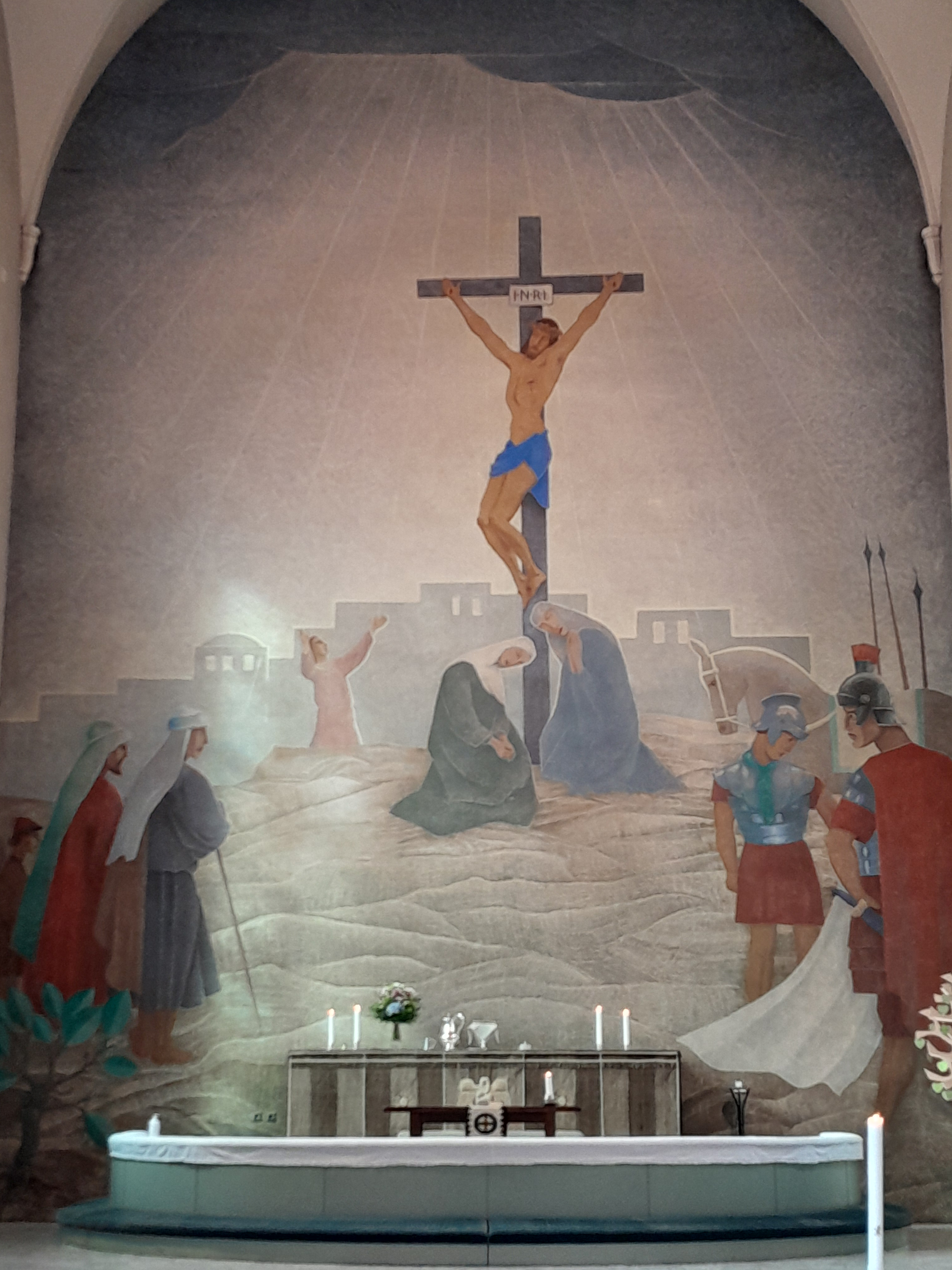
Main altar

Einari Wehmas and Karl Ingenius, artists from Turku, won the competition that was arranged for a work of art to decorate the altar wall. Their work is the most notable detail of the church. The whole altar wall is covered with an "al secco" painting of Jesus Christ nailed to the cross with friends and officials at Golgatha. This massive work is 15 metres (49 ft) high and 9.5 metres (31 ft) in breadth. At the time of painting this was the largest painting of its type in Scandinavia. Vehmas and Holvi painted the pictures on the arches in the nave. The upper one depicts the eye of God. On the arches there are symbolic pictures of the apostles and of a green clothed angel with a chalice in his hand. On the balcony of the organ gallery, the artists painted an advent scene. Several years later, Einari Vehmas painted the sacristy window paintings showing scenes of the Saviour with a child on his arm, Bishop Henry, and Martin Luther.

The altar cloth was designed by the textile artist Greta Skogster, and was presented to the church as a gift at the consecration ceremony by the parish sewing circle. The dominant feature of the altar cloth is pelicans: pelicans feeding their young with their own blood. This motif has been regarded as symbolic of the love of Christ. The church has received a number of gifts from both private people and societies. The seven branch silver candelabrum on the altar is a gift from Martin's church choir and was made by a member of the choir, silversmith Emil Sivonen.

== Organ ==
The church was in operation for a number of years unfinished, without an organ, church bells, or a clock in the spire. This was due to insufficient funds. Finally the harmonium that was installed in 1936 gave place to an organ. The 50-pipe organ is of the so-called romantic Orchestra organ type. The installation was designed by Sulo Muurikoski, parish organist for a long time. The electrification of the organ was done in 1981 by the organ builder Veikko Virtanen company. The spire got its clock in 1952, and chimes in 1955. The casting of the bells was done by the Friis Brothers bell foundry.

== Renovation ==
Repairs and improvements to the church have been undertaken in several phases. Most recently, in 1980–81, the exterior and interior surfaces were repaired and repainted, some of the pews at the back of the church were removed, the tower chapel was furnished, and entrances for the disabled were built. In 1987, the Independence celebration year of Finland, the members of the parish council presented the church with a remembrance plaque in honour of the members of the congregation who were killed in the 1939–44 war. The memorial tablet honours 181 names.

== Gallery ==
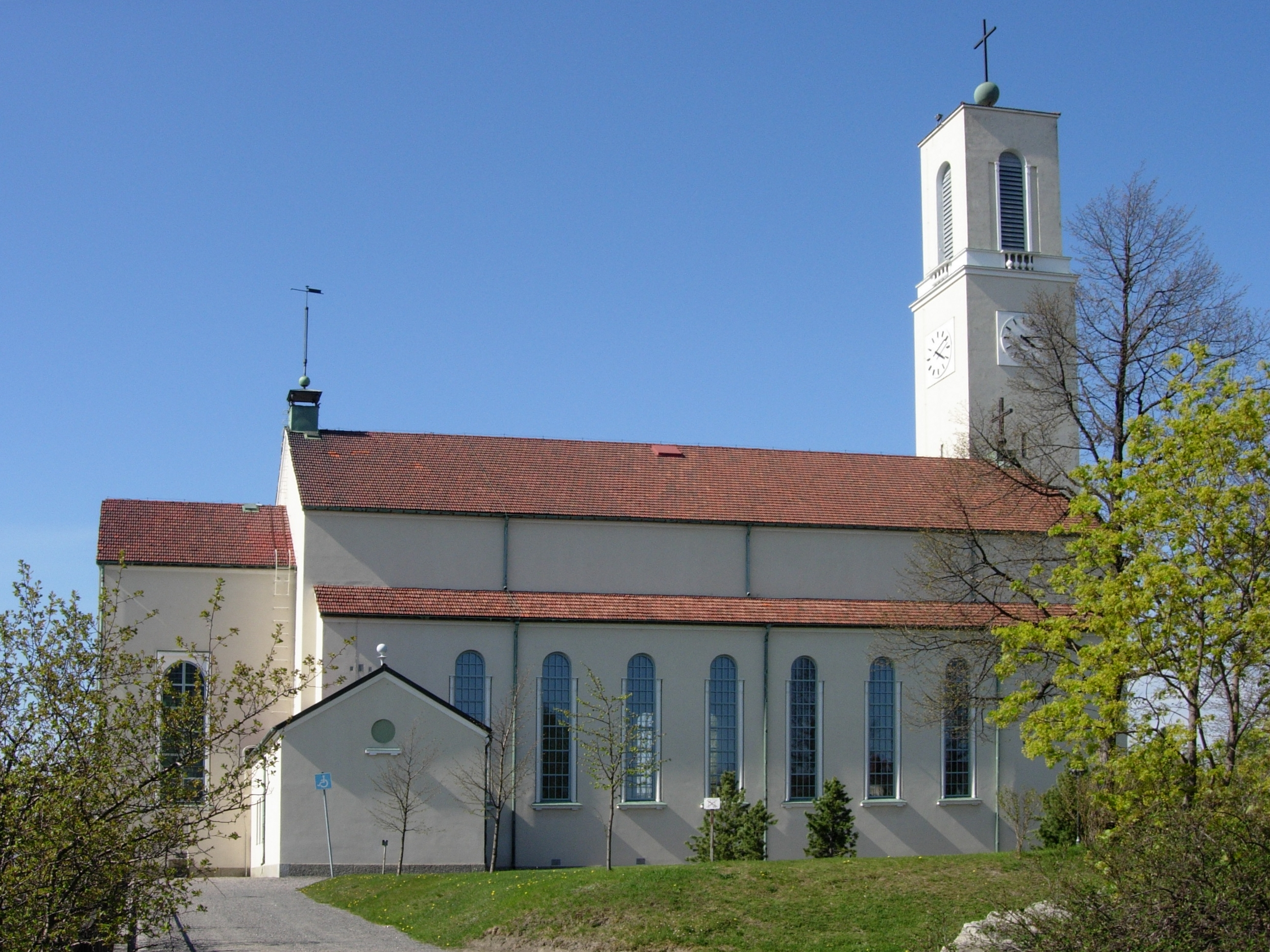

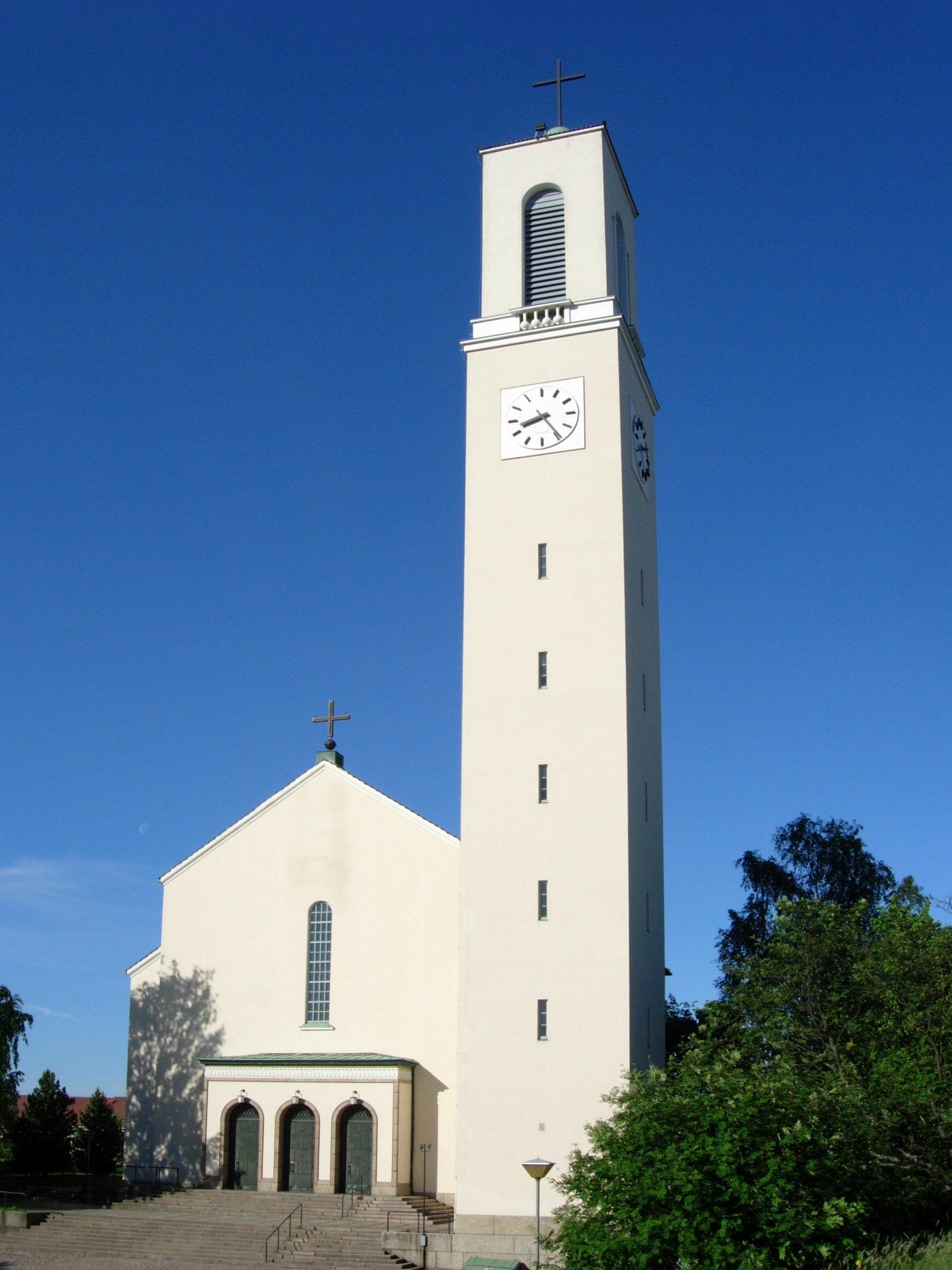

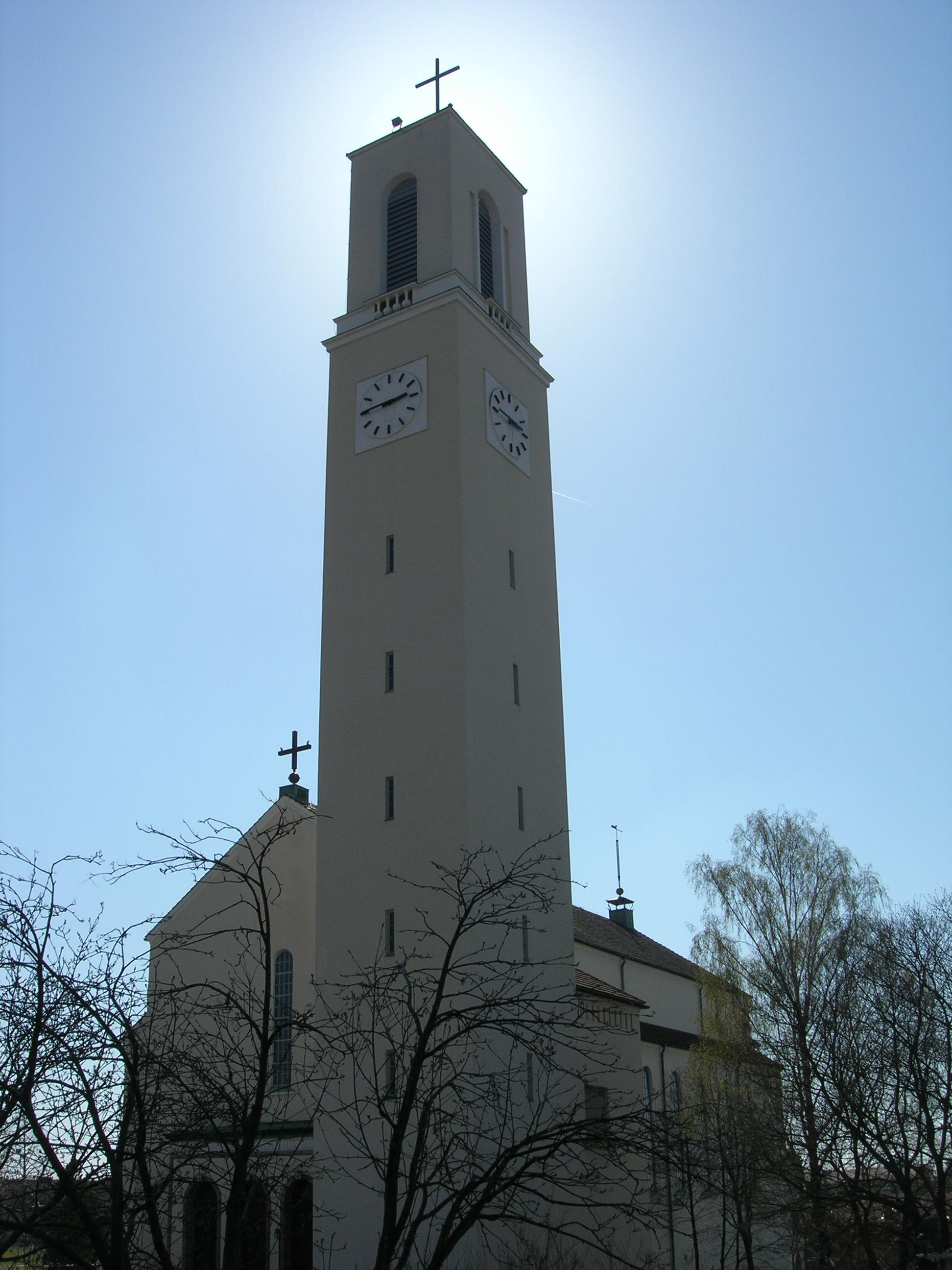

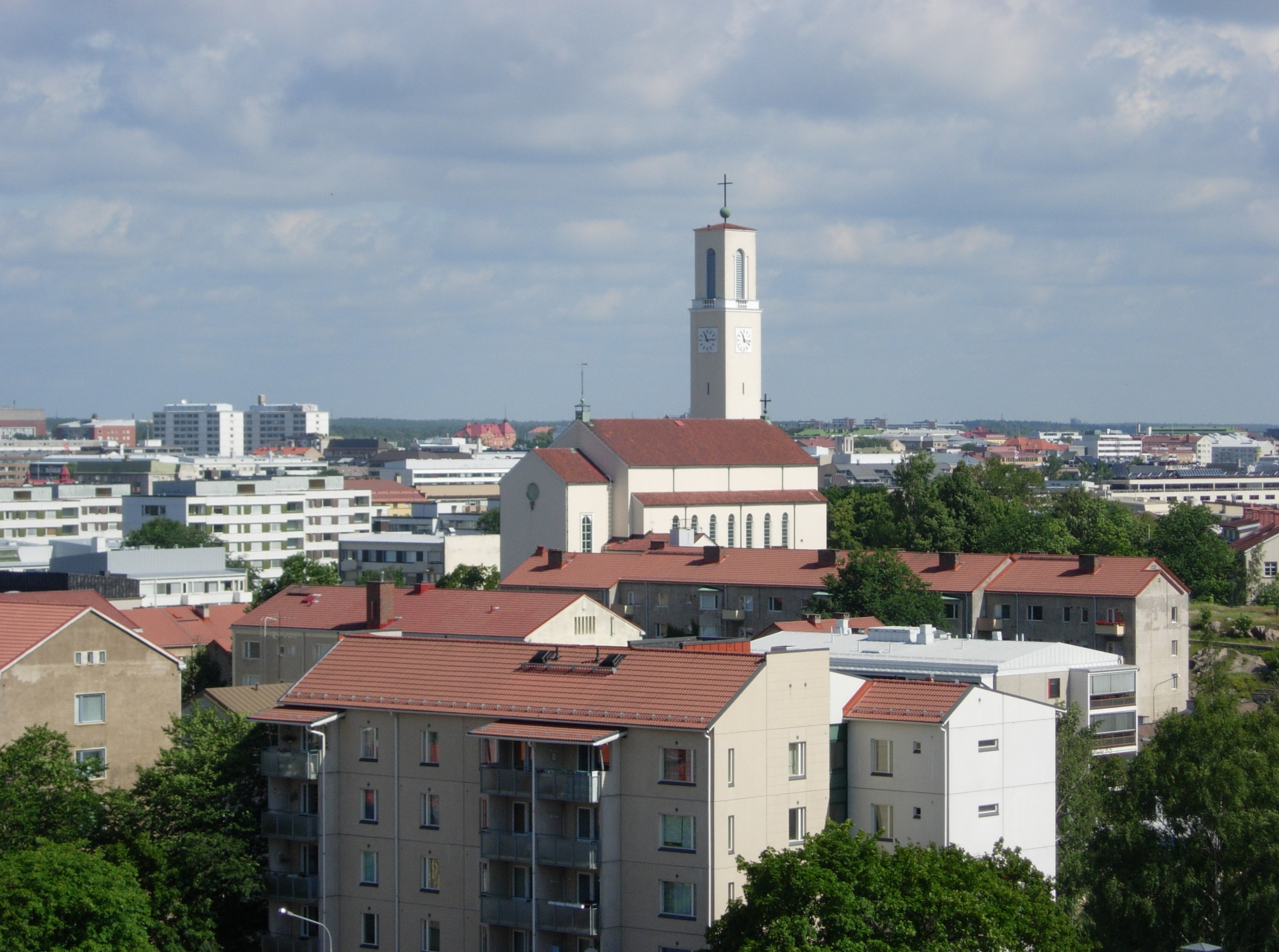

== See also ==
- Turku
- Evangelical Lutheran Church of Finland
- Turku Cathedral
- IV District, Turku
