= Point Martin =

Headland of Antarctica

Coordinates: 60°47′S 44°41′W

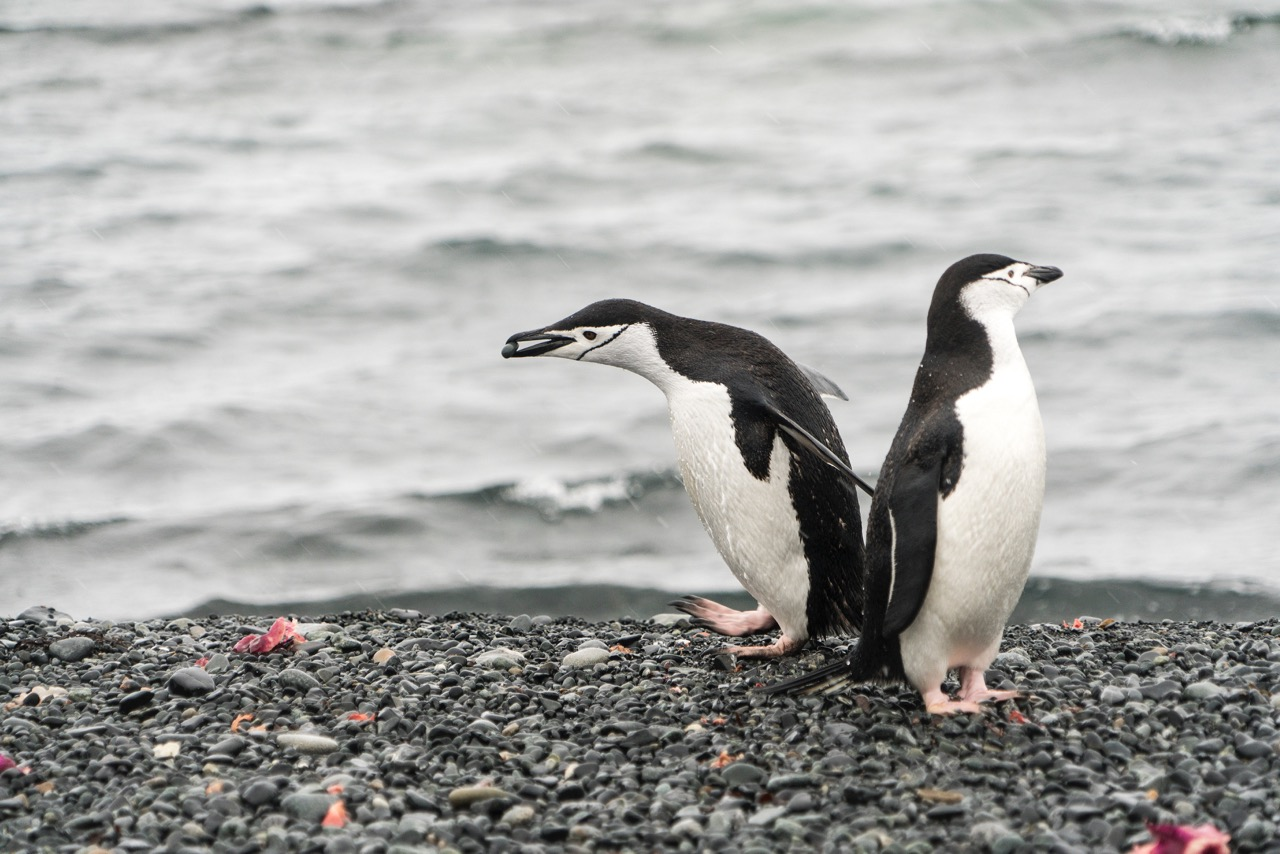
Chinstrap penguins breed in the IBA

Point Martin is a point on the east side of Mossman Peninsula, 1.5 km (0.93 mi) north-west of Cape Murdoch, on the south coast of Laurie Island in the South Orkney Islands of Antarctica. It was charted in 1903 by the Scottish National Antarctic Expedition under Bruce, who named it for J. Martin, an able seaman on the expedition ship Scotia.

== Important Bird Area ==
The point has been identified as an Important Bird Area (IBA) by BirdLife International because it supports breeding colonies of over 26,000 pairs of Adélie penguins and 13,000 pairs of chinstrap penguins.
