= Martin's Evangelical Church =

Historic church in South Dakota, United States

- U.S. National Register of Historic Places
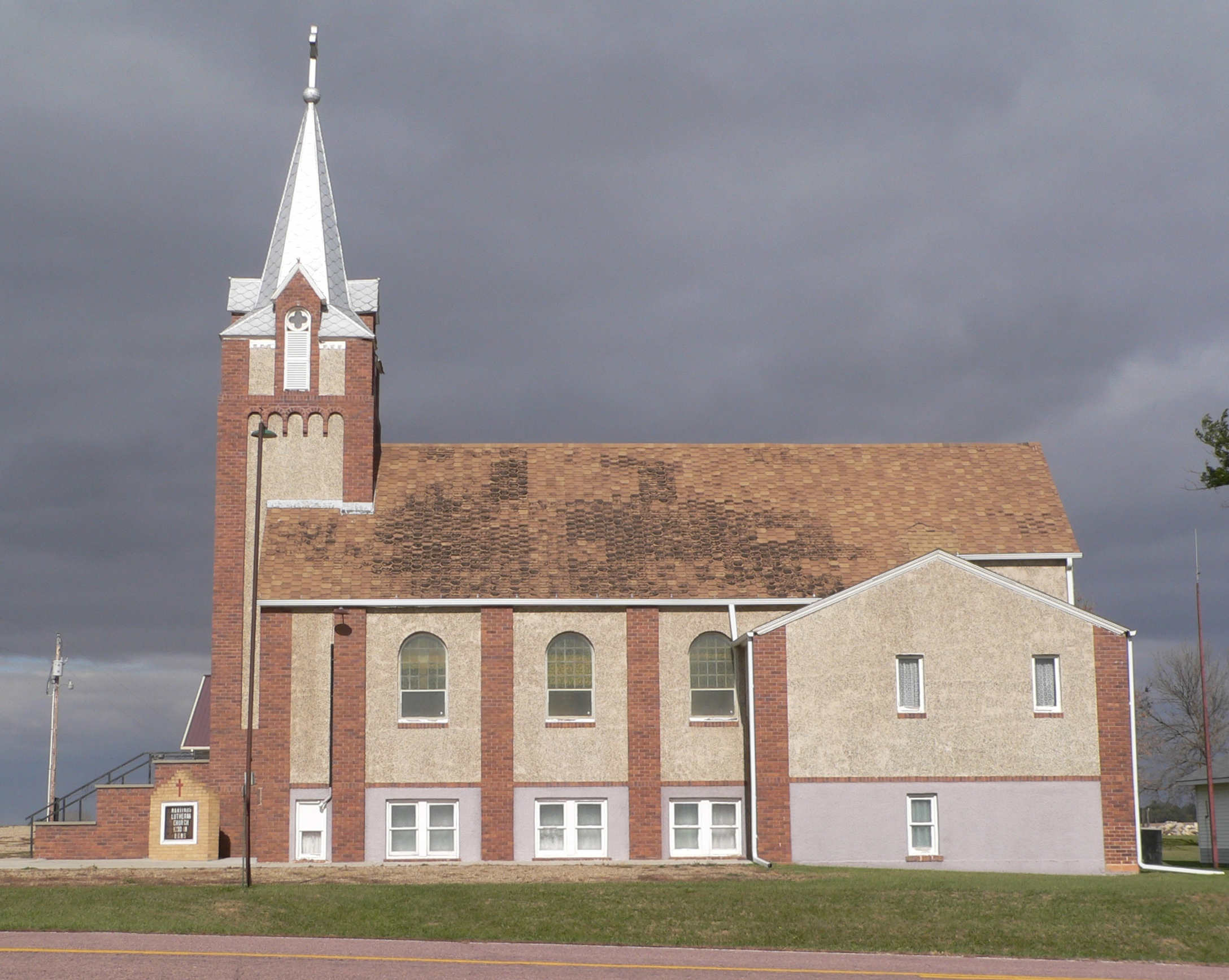

- Location within South Dakota Location within the United States
- Location: E of Lesterville, South Dakota
- Coordinates: 43.039345°N 97.437800°W
- Built: 1923
- MPS: Northern and Central Townships of Yankton MRA
- NRHP reference No.: 80003752
- Added to NRHP: April 16, 1980

Martin's Evangelical Church is a church east of Lesterville in Yankton County, South Dakota. It was built in 1923 and was added to the National Register of Historic Places in 1980.

The church's most salient feature is its central, square tower with "tall gable wall dormers, corbeled 'machicolation' arcading, and a polygonal termination." It has brick- and stucco-faced walls upon a concrete foundation.
