= Marten Creek =

Marten Creek may refer to the following creeks in the United States:

== Official name ==
- Marten Creek (Denali Borough), Alaska
- Marten Creek (Fairbanks North Star Borough), Alaska
- Marten Creek (Wrangell Borough), Alaska
- Marten Creek (634840N, 1532500W, Yukon-Koyukuk Census Area), Alaska
- Marten Creek (675900N, 1420400W, Yukon-Koyukuk Census Area), Alaska
- Marten Creek (Chandalar River tributary), Yukon-Koyukuk Census Area, Alaska
- Marten Creek (Colorado)
- Marten Creek (Boise County), Idaho
- Marten Creek (Clearwater County), Idaho
- Marten Creek (Idaho County), Idaho
- Marten Creek (Shoshone County), Idaho
- Marten Creek (Michigan)
- Marten Creek (Little Thompson River tributary), Sanders County, Montana
- Marten Creek (Noxon Reservoir tributary), Sanders County, Montana
- Marten Creek (Brice Creek Tributary), Lane County, Oregon
- Marten Creek (McKenzie River Tributary), Lane County, Oregon
- Marten Creek (Marion County), Oregon
- Marten Creek (King County), Washington
- Marten Creek (Skagit County), Washington
- Marten Creek (Snohomish County), Washington
- Marten Creek (Lincoln County), Wyoming
- Marten Creek (Sublette County), Wyoming

== Alternate name ==
The following features are also known as Marten Creek in addition to their official names:

- Grave Creek (Idaho)
- Lightning Creek (Idaho)
- West Fork Creek, Idaho

== See also ==
- Marten River (disambiguation)
