= Martin's Mill, Texas =

- Unincorporated community
- Location within Texas Location within the United States
- Coordinates: 32°24′59″N 95°47′25″W
- Country: United States
- State: Texas
- County: Van Zandt
- Elevation: 522 ft (159 m)
- Time zone: UTC-6 (Central (CST))
  - Summer (DST): UTC-5 (CDT)
- Area codes: 903 & 430
- GNIS feature ID: 1341036

Martin's Mill is an unincorporated community in south-central Van Zandt County, Texas, United States. According to the Handbook of Texas, the community had a population of 125 in 2000.

== History ==
The community derives its name from Daniel G. Martin, who settled on Heifer Creek and owned a gin and gristmill that were built just before the start of the American Civil War. It was located a mile southeast of where it currently stands today. Two churches in the community were Holly Springs Methodist Church (founded in 1852) and Liberty Community Baptist Church (founded in 1870). A post office was established at Martin's Mill in 1879 and remained in operation until after 1930. Its population was 75 in 1890 and went down to 40 two years later. A log building that was built here in 1875 was used as a community center and a church as early as 1900. A tornado hit Martin's Mill on May 25, 1907, and swept away all of its businesses. A Baptist congregation moved here from Sand Springs in 1919 and had a cotton gin, a corn mill, general stores, and other businesses. The population boomed to 200 in 1927 then plunged to 58 in the 1930s and went back up to 200 by the end of that decade. There was a church, a cemetery, a seasonal industry, and several scattered houses here in 1936. It then received electricity in 1944. The population was reduced by half in the late 1960s and went up to 125 from the early 1970s through 2000. A 1984 county highway map showed a church and some businesses in Martin's Mill.

== Geography ==
Martin's Mill is located in Cream Level Creek Valley at the intersection of Farm to Market Roads 858 and 1861, 10 mi (16 km) southeast of Canton in south-central Van Zandt County.

== Education ==
Martin's Mill had a log schoolhouse that was built in 1875. Another school called Friendship School was built sometime after 1900. A.G. Dean founded another school here that same decade and called it Lexie's Academy for his daughter, Lexie Dean Robertson. The two schools continued to operate in 1905, with one serving 35 Black students and the other serving 72 White students. Both schools came together to form the Martin's Mill ISD in 1964. Only one campus was reported in 1919. Today, the Martin's Mill Independent School District serves area students.

== Notable people ==
- Leon Black - Former head coach of the Texas Longhorns Basketball team and also coached at nearby Van High School. Black was a member of the first Mustang state championship team in the 1949 season.
- Jack Rhodes, country music songwriter and producer, was born in Martin's Mill in 1907.
