= Oslavice =

- Municipality
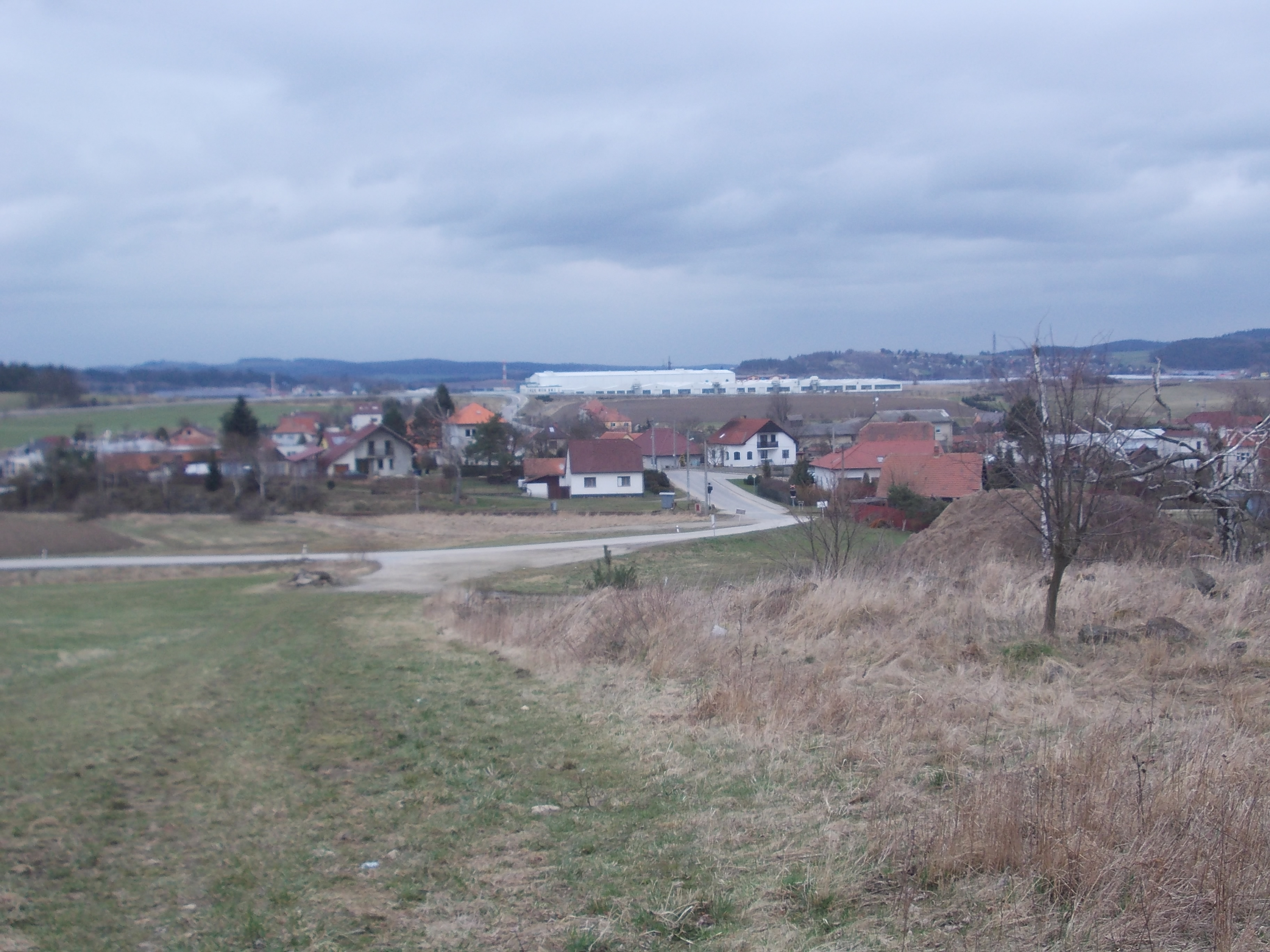
- View from the southwest

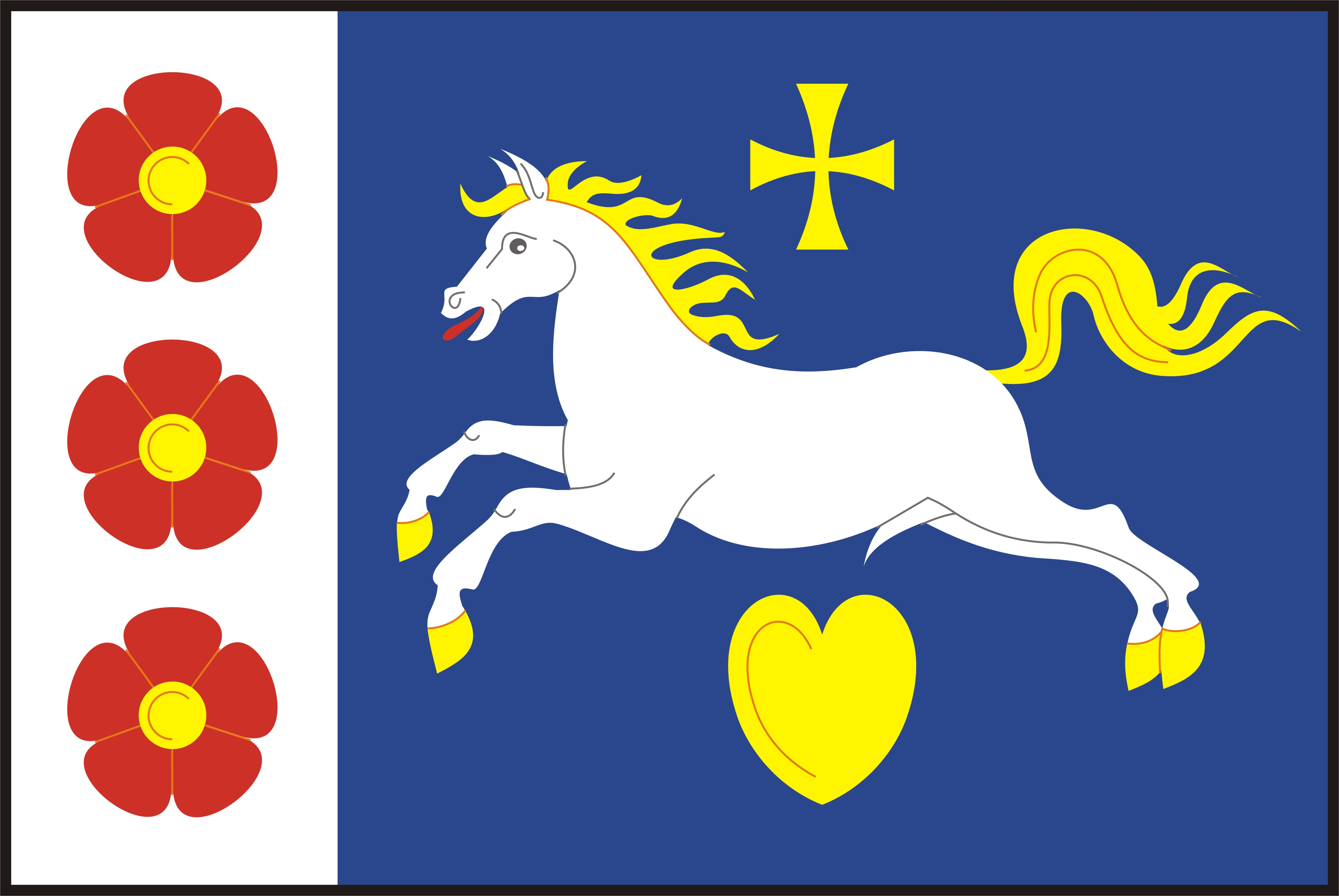
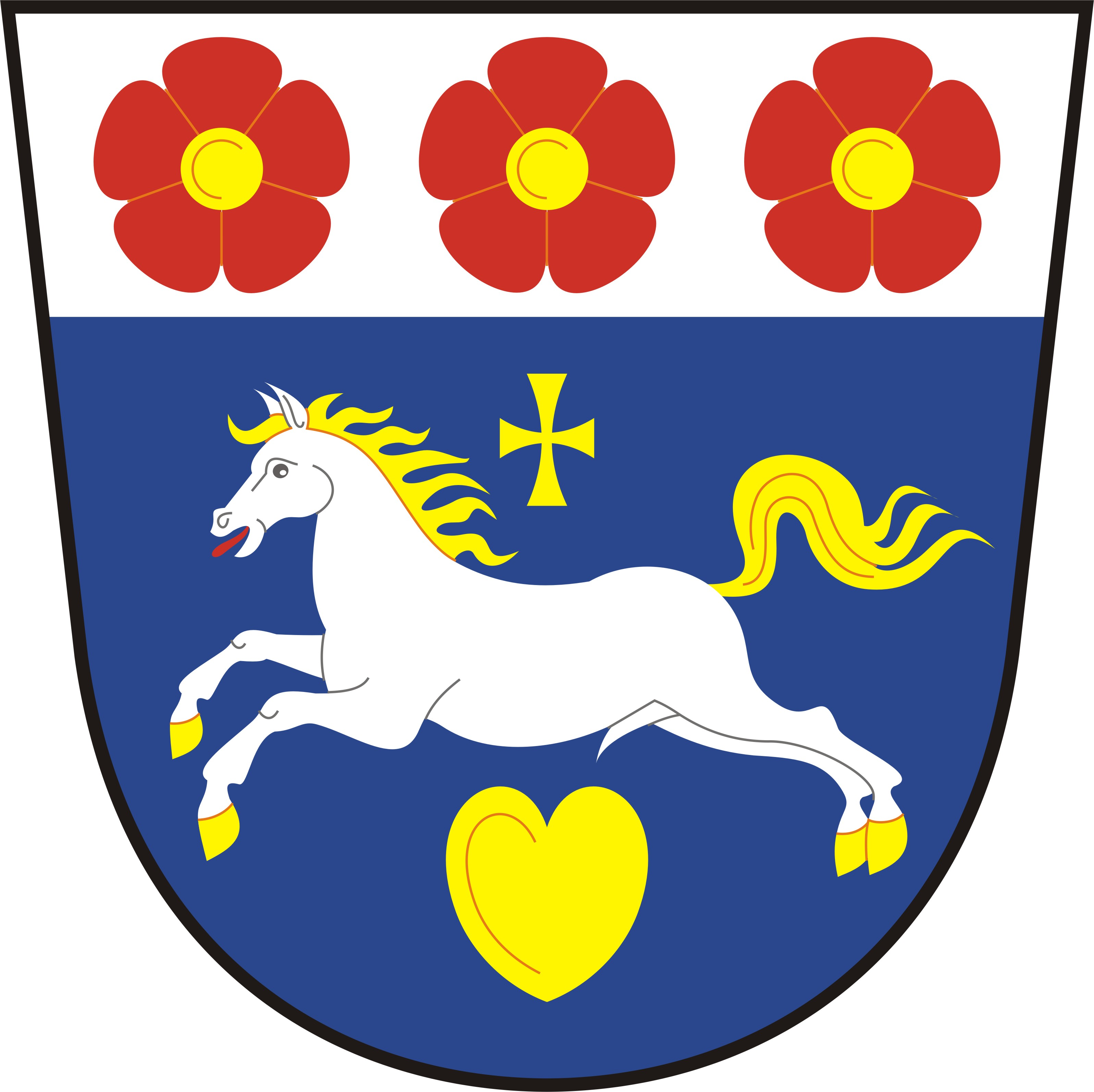
- Flag Coat of arms

- Location in the Czech Republic
- Coordinates: 49°20′27″N 15°59′27″E
- Country: Czech Republic
- Region: Vysočina
- District: Žďár nad Sázavou
- First mentioned: 1320

Area
  - Total: 6.38 km^{2} (2.46 sq mi)
- Elevation: 476 m (1,562 ft)

Population (2026-01-01)
  - Total: 769
  - Density: 121/km^{2} (312/sq mi)
- Time zone: UTC+1 (CET)
  - Summer (DST): UTC+2 (CEST)
- Postal code: 594 01
- Website: www.oslavice.cz

Oslavice (German: Groß Woslawitz) is a municipality and village in Žďár nad Sázavou District in the Vysočina Region of the Czech Republic. It has about 800 inhabitants.

== Geography ==
Oslavice is located about 24 kilometres (15 mi) south of Žďár nad Sázavou and 29 km (18 mi) east of Jihlava. It lies in the Křižanov Highlands. The highest point is at 524 m (1,719 ft) above sea level. The Oslavička Stream flows through the municipality.

== History ==
The first written mention of Oslavice is from 1320.

Oslavice was an independent municipality until 1 June 1980, when it was incorporated into Velké Meziříčí. Since 1 January 1992, it has been a separate municipality again.

== Demographics ==
Historical population

Year	Pop.	±%
1869	312	—
1880	352	+12.8%
1890	386	+9.7%
1900	407	+5.4%
1910	502	+23.3%

Year	Pop.	±%
1921	576	+14.7%
1930	546	−5.2%
1950	526	−3.7%
1961	446	−15.2%
1970	445	−0.2%

Year	Pop.	±%
1980	493	+10.8%
1991	508	+3.0%
2001	580	+14.2%
2011	663	+14.3%
2021	659	−0.6%

Source: Censuses

== Transport ==
Oslavice is located on the Křižanov–Studenec railway line of local importance.

== Sights ==
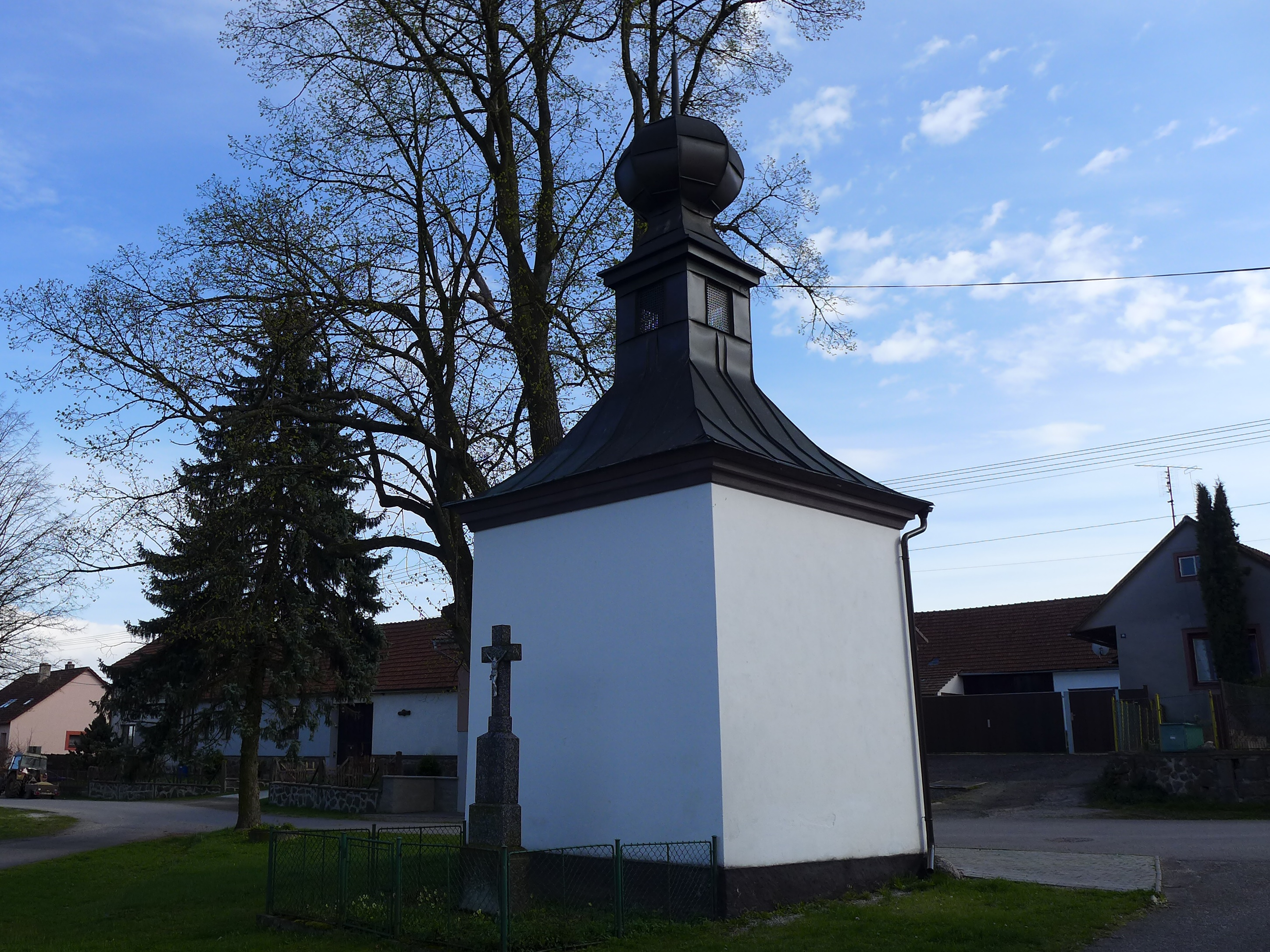
Chapel of Saint George

There are two chapels, the Chapel of Saint George and the modern Chapel of Divine Mercy. The Chapel of Saint George dates from 1867.
