= Martinice =

Martinice may refer to places in the Czech Republic:

- Martinice (Kroměříž District), a municipality and village in the Zlín Region
- Martinice (Žďár nad Sázavou District), a municipality and village in the Vysočina Region
- Martinice u Onšova, a municipality and village in the Vysočina Region
- Martinice v Krkonoších, a municipality and village in the Liberec Region
- Martinice, a village and part of Březnice (Příbram District) in the Central Bohemian Region
- Martinice, a village and part of Jenišovice (Chrudim District) in the Pardubice Region
- Martinice, a village and part of Jesenice (Příbram District) in the Central Bohemian Region
- Martinice, a village and part of Proseč in the Pardubice Region
- Martinice, a village and part of Votice in the Central Bohemian Region
  - Martinic family (House of Martinice), connected to this locale and its castle
- Martinice u Dolních Kralovic, a village and part of Dolní Kralovice in the Central Bohemian Region

== See also ==
- Martinić, a Croatian surname
