= Martinice (Žďár nad Sázavou District) =

- Municipality
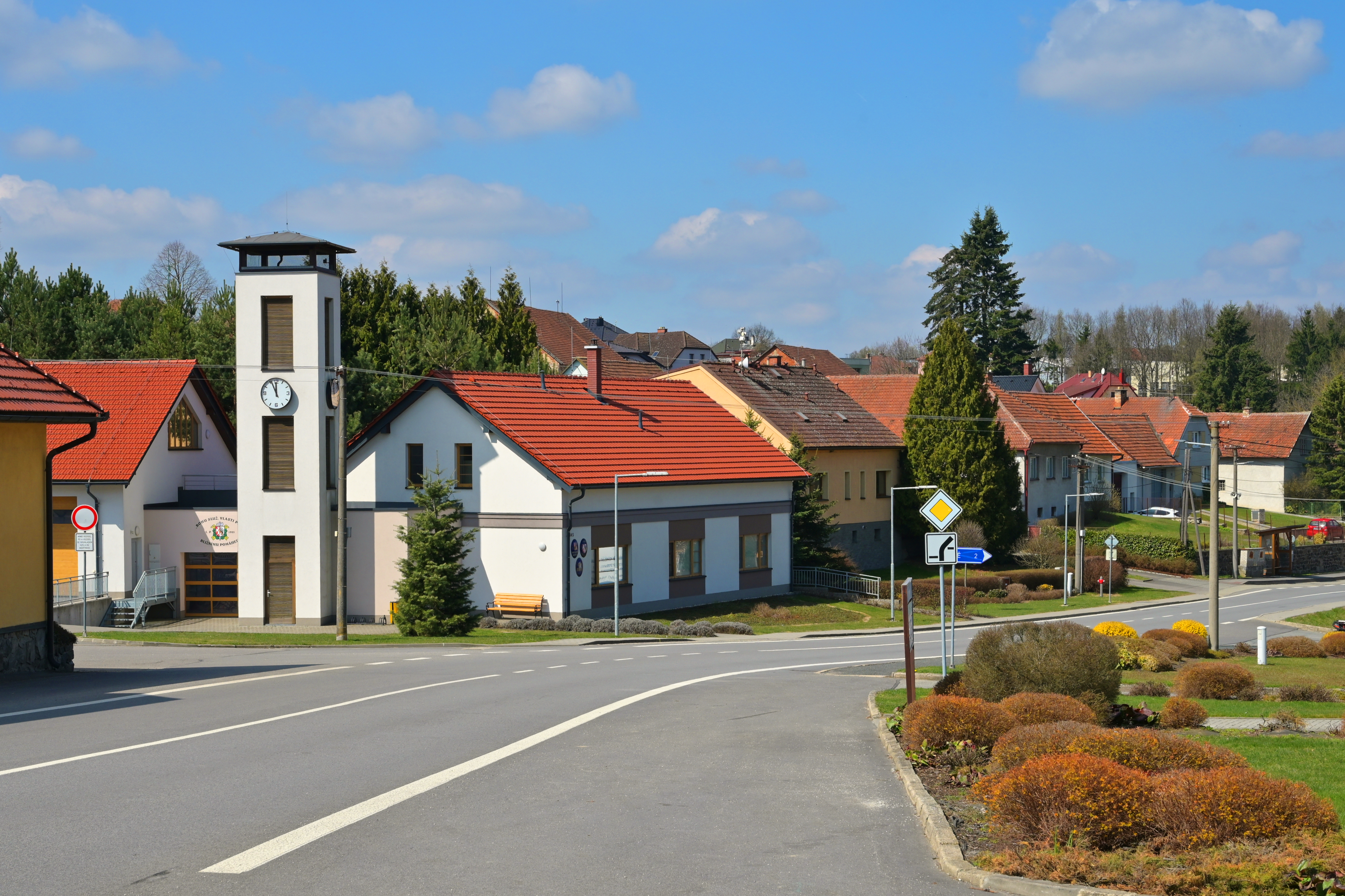
- Centre of Martinice

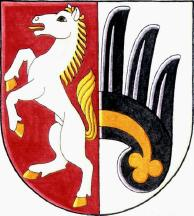
- Flag Coat of arms

- Location in the Czech Republic
- Coordinates: 49°22′18″N 16°2′18″E
- Country: Czech Republic
- Region: Vysočina
- District: Žďár nad Sázavou
- First mentioned: 1344

Area
  - Total: 6.05 km^{2} (2.34 sq mi)
- Elevation: 503 m (1,650 ft)

Population (2026-01-01)
  - Total: 463
  - Density: 76.5/km^{2} (198/sq mi)
- Time zone: UTC+1 (CET)
  - Summer (DST): UTC+2 (CEST)
- Postal code: 594 01
- Website: www.martinice.eu

Martinice is a municipality and village in Žďár nad Sázavou District in the Vysočina Region of the Czech Republic. It has about 500 inhabitants.

== Geography ==
Martinice is located about 22 kilometres (14 mi) south of Žďár nad Sázavou and 32 km (20 mi) east of Jihlava. It lies in the Křižanov Highlands. The highest point is at 583 m (1,913 ft) above sea level. There are several small fishponds in the municipal territory.

== History ==
The first written mention of Martinice is from 1344. There were initially two villages: Martinice (also called Velké Martinice) and Martiničky (also called Malé Martinice). They gradually merged into one village and the last mention of Martiničky appeared in 1495. For most of its history, Martinice was a part of the Velké Meziříčí estate. In the mid-17th century, the village consisted of 17 houses. In the 18th and 19th centuries, the village expanded by building smaller houses.

== Demographics ==
Historical population

Year	Pop.	±%
1869	248	—
1880	271	+9.3%
1890	242	−10.7%
1900	249	+2.9%
1910	288	+15.7%

Year	Pop.	±%
1921	302	+4.9%
1930	242	−19.9%
1950	304	+25.6%
1961	322	+5.9%
1970	339	+5.3%

Year	Pop.	±%
1980	381	+12.4%
1991	375	−1.6%
2001	413	+10.1%
2011	418	+1.2%
2021	450	+7.7%

Source: Censuses

== Transport ==
Martinice is located on the railway lines Žďár nad Sázavou–Velké Meziříčí and Křižanov–Studenec.

== Sights ==
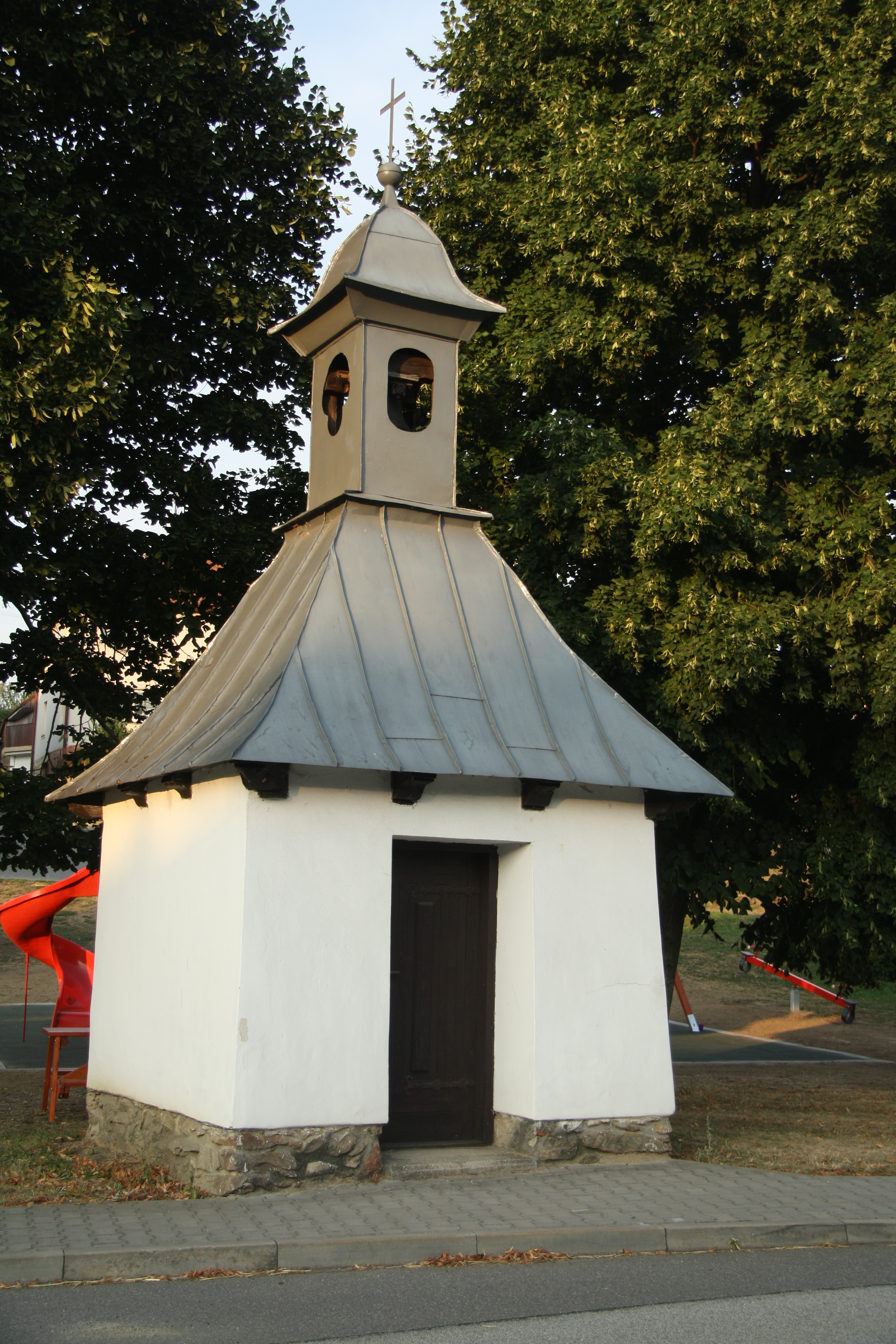
Belfry

There are no protected cultural monuments in the municipality. The main landmark is a belfry in the centre of Martinice.
