= Vlčatín =

- Municipality
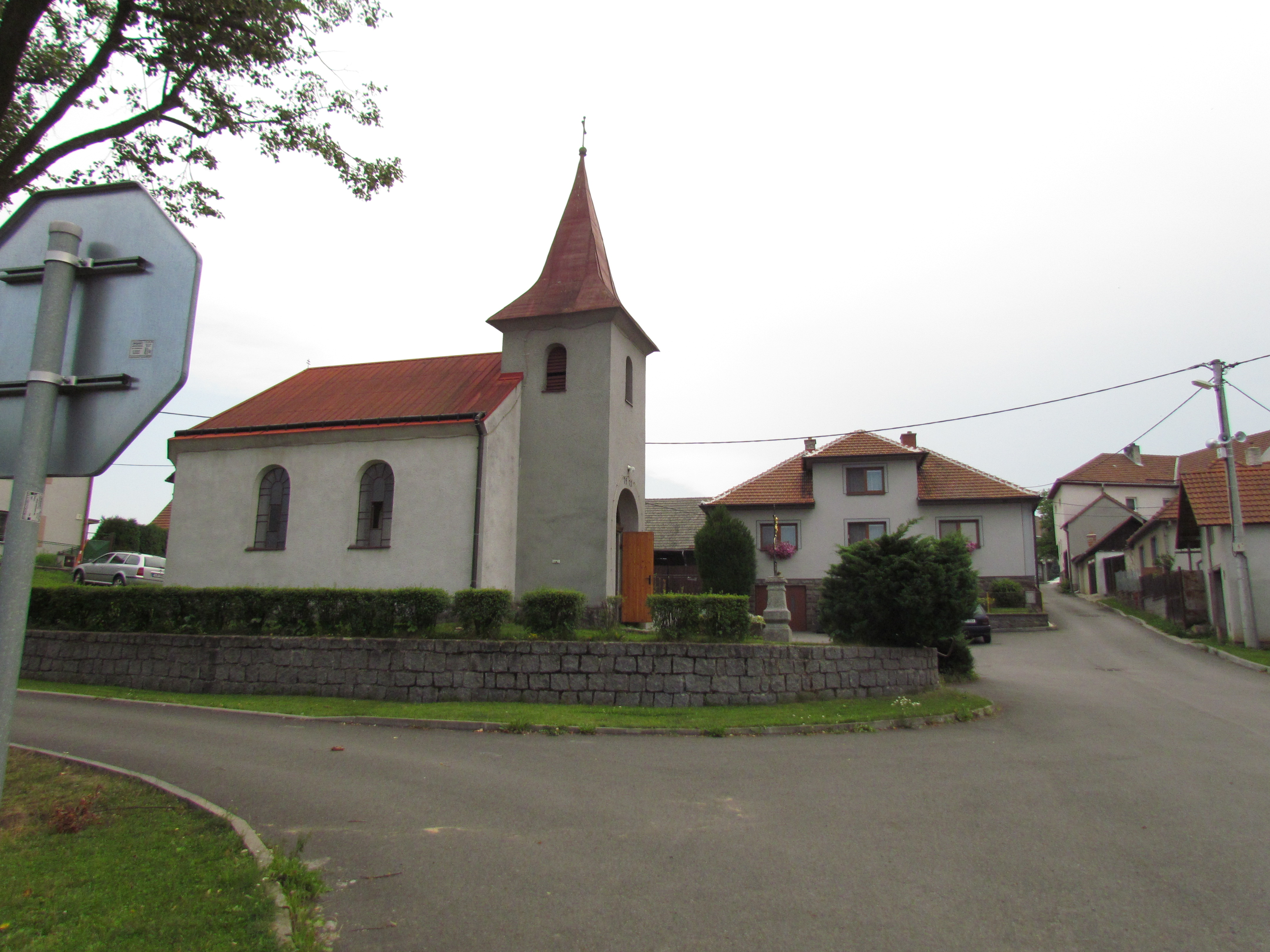
- Chapel of the Assumption of the Virgin Mary

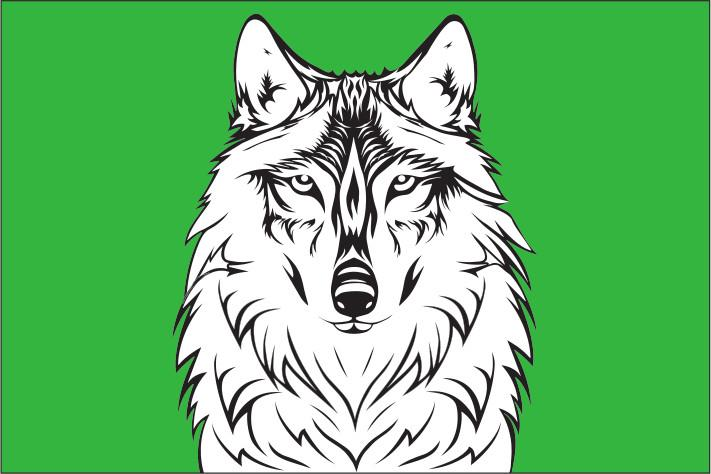
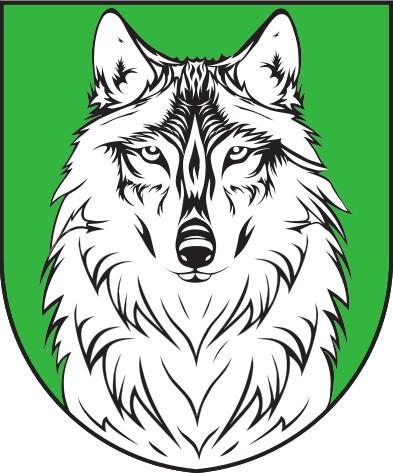
- Flag Coat of arms

- Location in the Czech Republic
- Coordinates: 49°18′21″N 15°56′56″E
- Country: Czech Republic
- Region: Vysočina
- District: Třebíč
- First mentioned: 1296

Area
  - Total: 4.77 km^{2} (1.84 sq mi)
- Elevation: 530 m (1,740 ft)

Population (2026-01-01)
  - Total: 147
  - Density: 30.8/km^{2} (79.8/sq mi)
- Time zone: UTC+1 (CET)
  - Summer (DST): UTC+2 (CEST)
- Postal code: 675 05
- Website: www.vlcatin.cz

Vlčatín is a municipality and village in Třebíč District in the Vysočina Region of the Czech Republic. It has about 100 inhabitants.

== Geography ==
Vlčatín is located about 11 kilometres (7 mi) north of Třebíč and 28 km (17 mi) east of Jihlava. It lies in the Křižanov Highlands. The highest point is the hill Na Hlavinách at 606 m (1,988 ft) above sea level. The Oslavička Stream flows through the municipality.

== History ==
The first written mention of Vlčatín is from 1296, when it was part of the Okarec estate. A stronghold located on the hill Hradisko above the village was destroyed by the army of Jan Žižka.

== Demographics ==
Historical population

Year	Pop.	±%
1869	187	—
1880	196	+4.8%
1890	188	−4.1%
1900	215	+14.4%
1910	240	+11.6%

Year	Pop.	±%
1921	224	−6.7%
1930	222	−0.9%
1950	186	−16.2%
1961	181	−2.7%
1970	169	−6.6%

Year	Pop.	±%
1980	174	+3.0%
1991	174	+0.0%
2001	146	−16.1%
2011	147	+0.7%
2021	139	−5.4%

Source: Censuses

== Transport ==
Vlčatín is located on the local railway line Studenec–Křižanov.

== Sights ==
The main landmark of Vlčatín is the Chapel of the Assumption of the Virgin Mary. It was built in 1910.
