= Jan Zahradníček =

Moravian (Czech) poet, journalist and translator

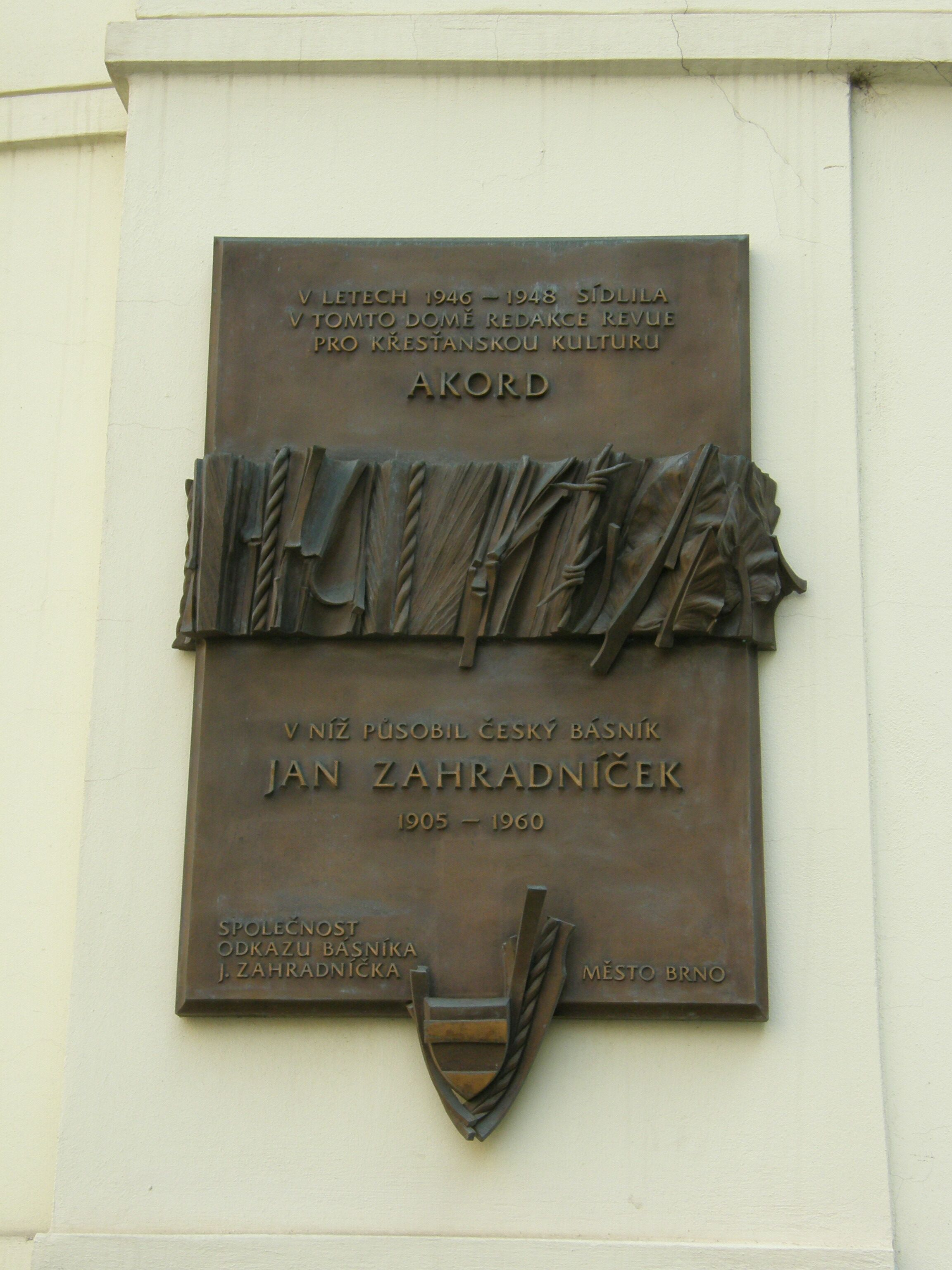
A historical marker in Brno

Jan Zahradníček (17 January 1905, Mastník, Moravia − 10 October 1960, Vlčatín) was a Moravian (Czech) poet, journalist and translator.

He was one of the most important Czech Catholic poets of the 20th century. Because of his faith and his anti-totalitarian work, he was imprisoned as an enemy of the Communist Party after the Communist coup of 1948.

== Biography ==
From 1919 to 1926 he studied at Třebíč gymnasium. He then studied literature and comparative literature at the Charles University in Prague. Among his teachers were the literary critic František Xaver Šalda and the writer Václav Tille. In 1936 he moved to Uhřínov to translate and write poetry. From 1940 until 1948 he was the editor of Akord Revue in Brno. In 1945, he became the editor of Brněnské tiskárny (a publishing house).

In June 1951 he was arrested by the Communist secret police (StB) and sentenced to 13 years' imprisonment. In 1960 he was granted amnesty due to his worsening health. He died in the same year, in an ambulance while passing through the municipality of Vlčatín. He was buried in Uhřínov.

He had four children, two daughters died from mushroom poisoning in the time of his imprisonment.

== Published works ==
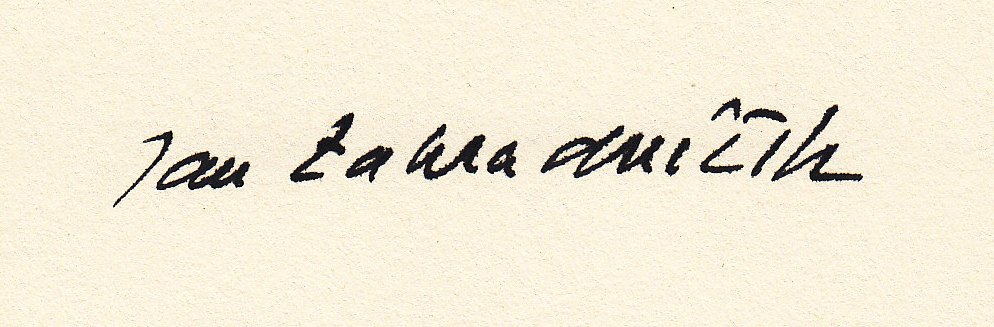
Jan Zahradníček's signature

- 1930 − Pokušení smrti
- 1933 − Jeřáby
- 1935 − Žíznivé léto
- 1937 − Pozdravení slunci
- 1940 − Korouhve
- 1947 − La Saletta
- 1948 − Znamení moci, an anti-Communist poetry collection censored by the Communist regime; a translation of Dante Alighieri's Divina comedia which could not be published under Zahradníček's name.

Verse books from prison Čtyři léta and Dům strach were published in exile (Canada) during the 1970s.
