= Adam Huber of Riesenpach =

Czech medical doctor, publisher and translator

Adam Huber of Riesenpach (Czech: Adam Huber z Riesenpachu, also called Adam Huber Meziříčský; Latinized as Huberus; 3 January 1545 – 23 June 1613) was a Czech medical doctor, publisher and translator of medical books. He served as the personal medical doctor to Emperor Rudolf II.

== Life and work ==
Huber was born in the Moravian town of Velké Meziříčí, possibly with the original surname of Hubeny. He studied medicine and philosophy at the universities of Wittenberg, Leipzig and Marburg before he joined Prague University in 1567. He also worked as a private tutor, and in 1577, he became a doctor of medicine. In 1578, he was given the title "of Riesenpach". He conducted dissections along with Jan Jesenius and gave medical lectures. He taught the ideas of Aristotle, Hippocrates and Galen and discussed the works of Leonhart Fuchs and Andreas Vesalius. He was elected provost in 1568 and was a supporter of the reform movement. He was active during the plague outbreak in Prague. He married in 1580 and left his university position and became the town's medical doctor in Litoměřice. He started a private Gymnasium Huberianum in Prague, apart from medical practice, running a pharmacy and brewery. In 1596, he translated and published Pietro Andrea Mattioli's herbarium as Herbář aneb Bylinář vysoce učeného a vznešeného P. Doktora Petra Ondřege Mathiola. He also collaborated with Adam Zalužanský of Zalužany and had a wide network of correspondents, including the politician Václav Budovec of Budov, the chemists Matthias Borbonius and Oswald Croll, and the professor Johann Heinrich Alsted. In 1611, he returned to the university when the rules of celibacy for professors were removed. He served as chancellor of the university in 1612–1613. In his inaugural lecture, he spoke about medicine being "the noblest art, most useful for all mankind". He died from a stroke at the age of 68.
