= Jaroslava Blažková =

Jaroslava Blažková (15 November 1933 – 20 February 2017) was a Slovak novelist, short story writer, children's writer and journalist.

== Biography ==
Born in Velké Meziříčí in what is now the Czech Republic, she first attended secondary school in Prague but completed her schooling in Bratislava. After her studies in the philosophical department of Comenius University in Bratislava, in 1954 she worked as a journalist and freelance writer. In the early 1960s, she became one of the most important contributors to Mladá Tvorba, a literary journal for young people. She was also a key member of the so-called Generation 56 group of young authors, publishing innovative short stories in Mladá tvorba, Kultúrny život and other journals, written in a colloquial style with ironic overtones. Her successful novella Nylonový mesiac (Nylon Moon, 1961), which later formed the basis of a screenplay, is a good example. Her emphasis on the emancipation of her heroines can be seen in her collection of short stories Jahniatko a grandi (Lambs and Grandees, 1964). Her novel Môj skvelý brat Robinson (My Excellent Brother Robinson, 1968) is aimed at a young-adult readership, telling the story of rivalry between two brothers for the heroine and bringing out the tensions between the older generation and the new approach of youth.

After the Soviet invasion of Czechoslovakia in 1968, she emigrated to Canada, settling in Toronto. Her books were no longer published in Czechoslovakia but she joined the Slovak service of the Canadian Broadcasting Corporation in Montreal, edited Nový domov (a magazine for émigrés) and worked for Josef Škvorecký's publishing house 68 Publishers. She lived in Guelph, Ontario, but frequently visited Slovakia where her books have been republished.

== Works ==
=== For adults ===
- 1961: Nylonový mesiac
- 1964: Jahniatko a grandi, short stories and novellas
- 1968: Môj skvelý brat Robinson, novel
- 1997: ... ako z gratulačnej karty (prose works)
- 2001: Svadba v Káne Galilejskej, short stories
- 2005: Happyendy
- 2013: To decko je blázon (Zo spomienok rozmaznanej dcérušky)

=== For children ===
- Tóno, ja a mravce, educational book
- Ostrov kapitána Hašašara, educational book
- Ohňostroj pre deduška, humorous work
- Daduška a jarabáč, picture book for small children
- Ako si mačky kúpili televízor, fairy tale
- Rozprávky z červenej ponožky, stories
- Minka a pyžaminka
- Traja nebojsovia a duch Miguel
- Mačky vo vreci, funny stories
