= Imperial Maneuvers (Austria-Hungary) =

Austro-Hungarian Imperial Maneuvers Kaisermanöver
- From the Imperial Maneuvers in Bohemia (Světozor magazine, September 1905)
- Status: Not active
- Location: various
- Country: Austria-Hungary
- Years active: c. 1870–1914
- Attendance: Austro-Hungarian Army; Austro-Hungarian Navy
- Organizer: Austro-Hungarian General Staff

The Austro-Hungarian Imperial Maneuvers (German: Kaisermanöver) were large-scale annual military exercises of the Austro-Hungarian Army, held from the late 19th century until 1914. These events were intended to improve the training of troops and staff, test for tactical regulations and technical inovations, but also to assert the military power and prestige of the Austro-Hungarian Empire and its ruler as the supreme military commander. The components of an imperial maneuvers included military parades of the participating army corps and the multi-day army maneuvers and war games. Similar large-scale exercises were also common in other European countries at that time, such as the Russian Empire, the Kingdom of Italy, and the Kaisermanöver of the Imperial German Army especially.

== History ==
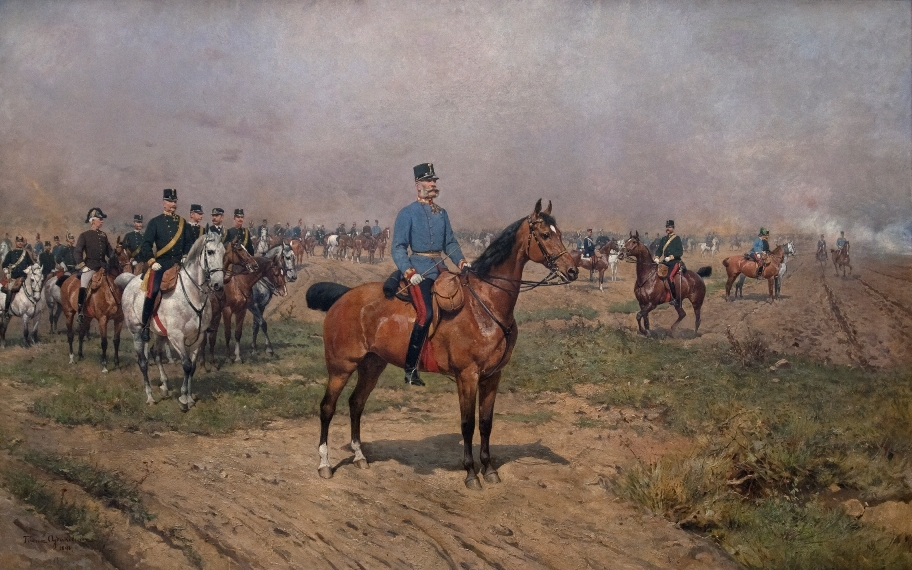
Emperor Franz Joseph I during the Imperial Maneuvers in Schwarzenau, 1891 (painting by Tadeusz Ajdukiewicz)

General military exercises marked as Kaisermanöver were mentioned regurlarly in the Austrian press since 1870, three years after establishing Austria-Hungary and its new army itself. Under the General Staff's chief General Friedrich von Beck in the 1880s the exercise expanded to include also the Navy, Landwehr, and Honvéd troops. Held mostly during summer months on a various parts of the large empire, the exercise got its name by regular presence of the Emperor Franz Joseph I. The event, every year well covered by the press, was helping to upgrade army's prestige and also present strength of military alliances, especially with the German Empire, as the visits of the German Emperor Wilhelm II there and the Austro-Hungarian royal officials at the German Kaisermanöver started to being reciprocal. Wilhelm II was present at one of the largest such maneuvers in September 1909 near Velké Meziříčí, Moravia, together with Emperor Franz Joseph and Archduke Franz Ferdinand.

During the years Austro-Hungarian foreign policy was using the Imperial Maneuvers as a reaction on its border conflicts. However, the June 1914 maneuvers of the XVth and XVIth Army Corps in Austria-annexed Bosnia and Herzegovina, during which the Austro-Hungarian heir, Archduke Franz Ferdinand, and his wife Sophie were assassinated in Sarajevo, was not marked as 1914 Kaisermanöver.

Those took place in eastern Styria and western Hungary in April or May 1914 being also the last, as initial start of World War I in July of that year and full military involvement of the Austro-Hungarian Army in the conflict broke the tradition, which after the empire's collapse was never renewed.

== List of the Austro-Hungarian Imperial Maneuvers (selection) ==
- 1870 – Buda, Kingdom of Hungary
- 1885 – Plzeň, Bohemia
- 1891 – Schwarzenau, Lower Austria
- 1895 – České Budějovice, Bohemia
- 1909 – Velké Meziříčí, Moravia

== In art ==
The Austro-Hungarian Imperial Maneuvers serve as a story set for the 1954 romantic comedy movie Kaisermanöver, directed by Franz Antel.
