= Mastník =

- Municipality
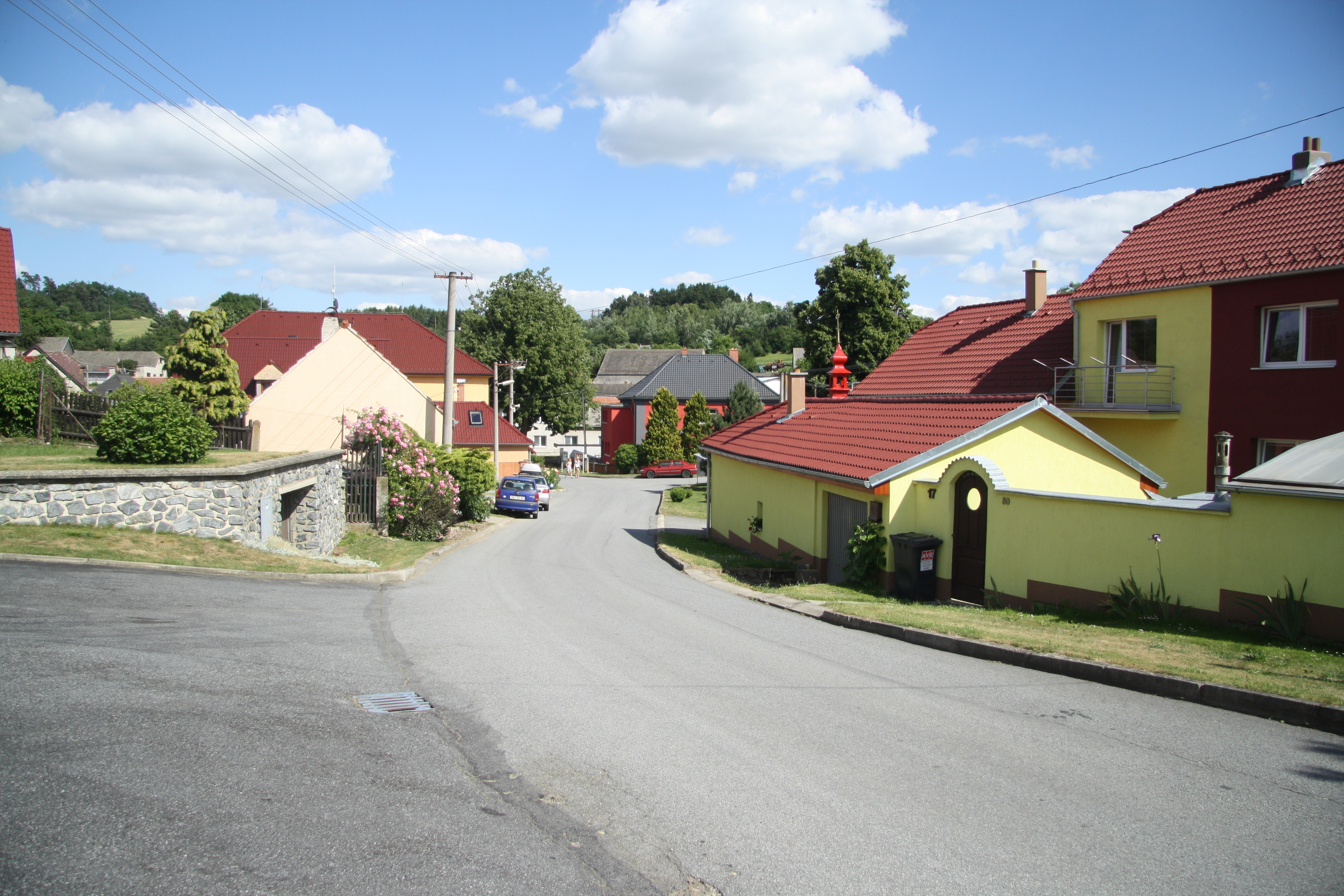
- Centre of Mastník

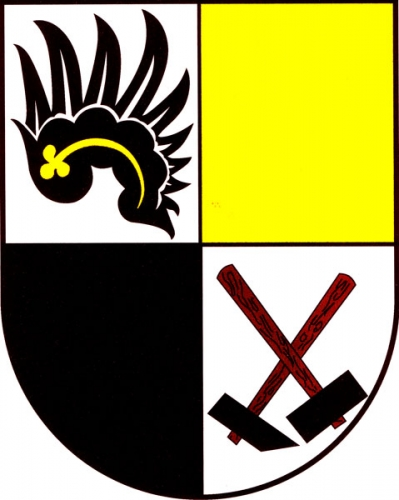
- Coat of arms

- Location in the Czech Republic
- Coordinates: 49°10′49″N 15°49′40″E
- Country: Czech Republic
- Region: Vysočina
- District: Třebíč
- First mentioned: 1406

Area
  - Total: 5.30 km^{2} (2.05 sq mi)
- Elevation: 508 m (1,667 ft)

Population (2026-01-01)
  - Total: 206
  - Density: 38.9/km^{2} (101/sq mi)
- Time zone: UTC+1 (CET)
  - Summer (DST): UTC+2 (CEST)
- Postal code: 675 22
- Website: www.obecmastnik.cz

Mastník is a municipality and village in Třebíč District in the Vysočina Region of the Czech Republic. It has about 200 inhabitants.

== Geography ==
Mastník is located about 5 kilometres (3 mi) southwest of Třebíč and 29 km (18 mi) southeast of Jihlava. It lies in the Jevišovice Uplands. The highest point is the hill Pekelný kopec at 572 m (1,877 ft) above sea level.

== Demographics ==
Historical population
Year	Pop.	±%
1869	262	—
1880	224	−14.5%
1890	268	+19.6%
1900	311	+16.0%
1910	310	−0.3%
1921	323	+4.2%
1930	318	−1.5%
1950	275	−13.5%
1961	292	+6.2%
1970	266	−8.9%
1980	236	−11.3%
1991	209	−11.4%
2001	223	+6.7%
2011	236	+5.8%
2021	189	−19.9%
Source: Censuses

== Notable people ==
- Jan Zahradníček (1905–1960), poet
