= Uhřínov =

- Municipality
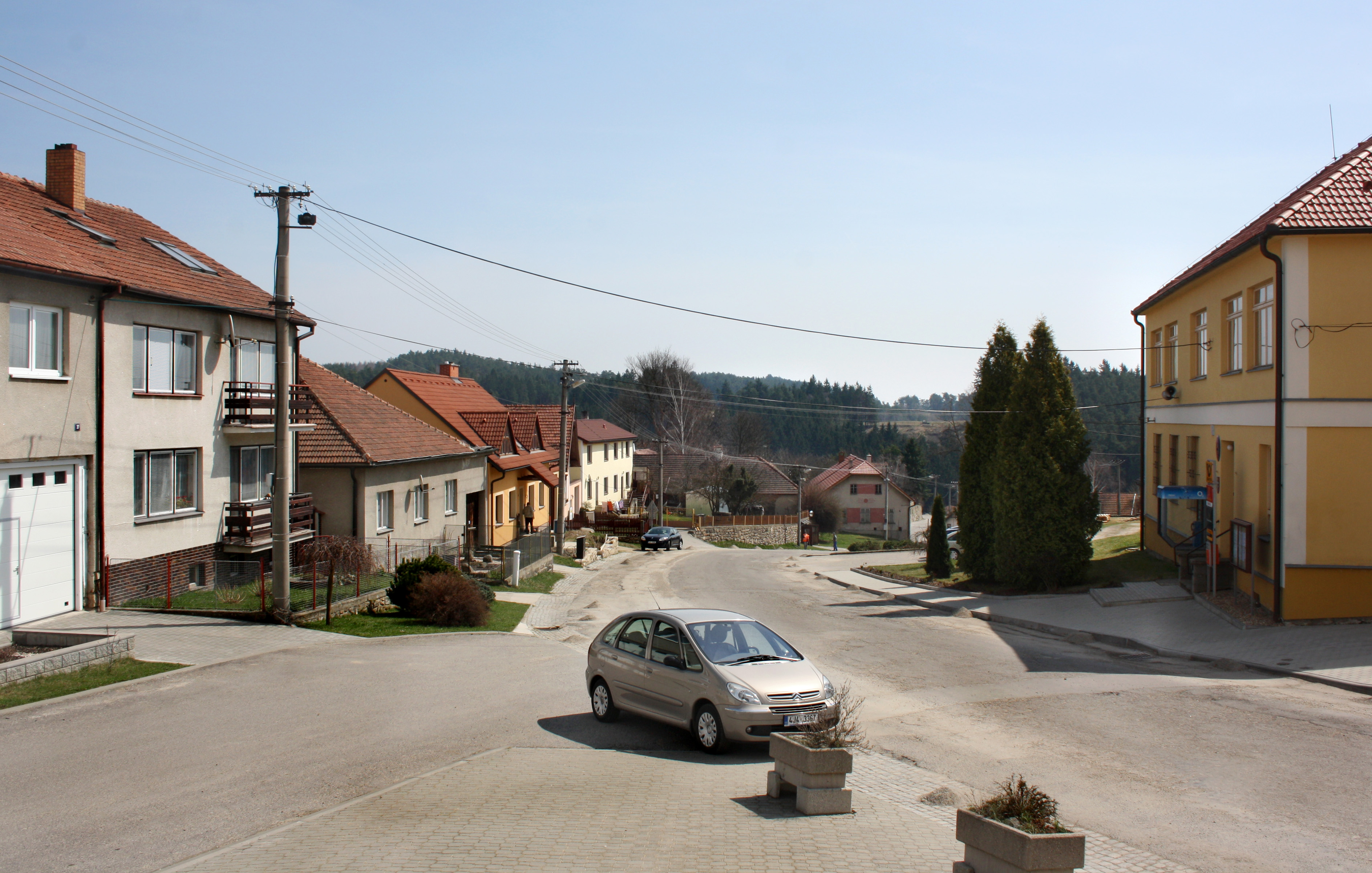
- Centre of Uhřínov

- Flag Coat of arms

- Location in the Czech Republic
- Coordinates: 49°21′0″N 15°56′17″E
- Country: Czech Republic
- Region: Vysočina
- District: Žďár nad Sázavou
- First mentioned: 1348

Area
  - Total: 6.22 km^{2} (2.40 sq mi)
- Elevation: 489 m (1,604 ft)

Population (2026-01-01)
  - Total: 402
  - Density: 64.6/km^{2} (167/sq mi)
- Time zone: UTC+1 (CET)
  - Summer (DST): UTC+2 (CEST)
- Postal codes: 594 01, 594 41
- Website: www.uhrinov.cz

Uhřínov is a municipality and village in Žďár nad Sázavou District in the Vysočina Region of the Czech Republic. It has about 400 inhabitants.

Uhřínov lies approximately 25 kilometres (16 mi) south of Žďár nad Sázavou, 26 km (16 mi) east of Jihlava, and 137 km (85 mi) south-east of Prague.

== Administrative division ==
Uhřínov consists of two municipal parts (in brackets population according to the 2021 census):

- Uhřínov (344)
- Šeborov (32)

== Demographics ==
Historical population
Year	Pop.	±%
1869	331	—
1880	389	+17.5%
1890	359	−7.7%
1900	381	+6.1%
1910	465	+22.0%
1921	383	−17.6%
1930	393	+2.6%
1950	349	−11.2%
1961	369	+5.7%
1970	317	−14.1%
1980	269	−15.1%
1991	256	−4.8%
2001	268	+4.7%
2011	288	+7.5%
2021	376	+30.6%
Source: Censuses

== Notable people ==
- Jan Zahradníček (1905–1960), poet; lived here and is buried here
