= Adam Zalužanský of Zalužany =

Adam Zalužanský of Zalužany (Czech: Adam Zalužanský ze Zalužan, also Latinised as Adamus Mathiades Hradistenus; c. 1555 – 8 December 1613) was a Czech botanist, medical doctor and professor of medicine. The plant genus Zaluzianskya is named in his honour.

== Biography ==
Zalužanský of Zalužany was born around 1555 or possibly 1560 in Mnichovo Hradiště where his father Mathias was an estate manager in the employ of Adam of Wartenberg (Vartenberk), giving him his Latinized name of Hradistenus used in some works. He studied at the University of Wittenberg and at Charles University, Prague. He became a teacher in the parish school St. Henry in Prague and then studied medicine at the University of Helmstedt. He then returned to teach Latin and Greek at the University of Prague in 1587 becoming rector in 1593. He married in 1594, breaking the rule for university professors, and which resulted in his being stripped of all positions. He then became a general practitioner in Prague and served as apothecary to Emperor Rudolf II. He treated people during the plague outbreak in 1613 but he himself got infected and died. He published three book on plants and was interested in separating the discipline of botanical research from medicine.

== Contributions to medicine and botany ==
Zalužanský was one of the early botanists who attempted to place plants in an evolutionary sequence and determined that mosses and fungi were simpler forms. He was also a pioneer in the examination of plant sexuality in his chapter "De sexu plantarum" where he stated that plants had male and female parts sometimes on separate plants (taking the example of the date palm, Phoenix dactylifera) and sometimes on the same plant. His work was examined by Linnaeus although his name was incorrectly spelled. His book Methodi herbariae libri tres (1592) also included dichotomous branching keys to groups of plants.

Along with Adam Huber, he conducted among the rare human body dissections of the period. This was however not done in public as by a later medical doctor Jan Jesenius (Jan Jesenský, 1566–1621) who was, for his participation in Protestant reform, sentenced to death by beheading and put on public display.
