= Velké Meziříčí =

Town in the Vysočina Region, Czech Republic

- Town
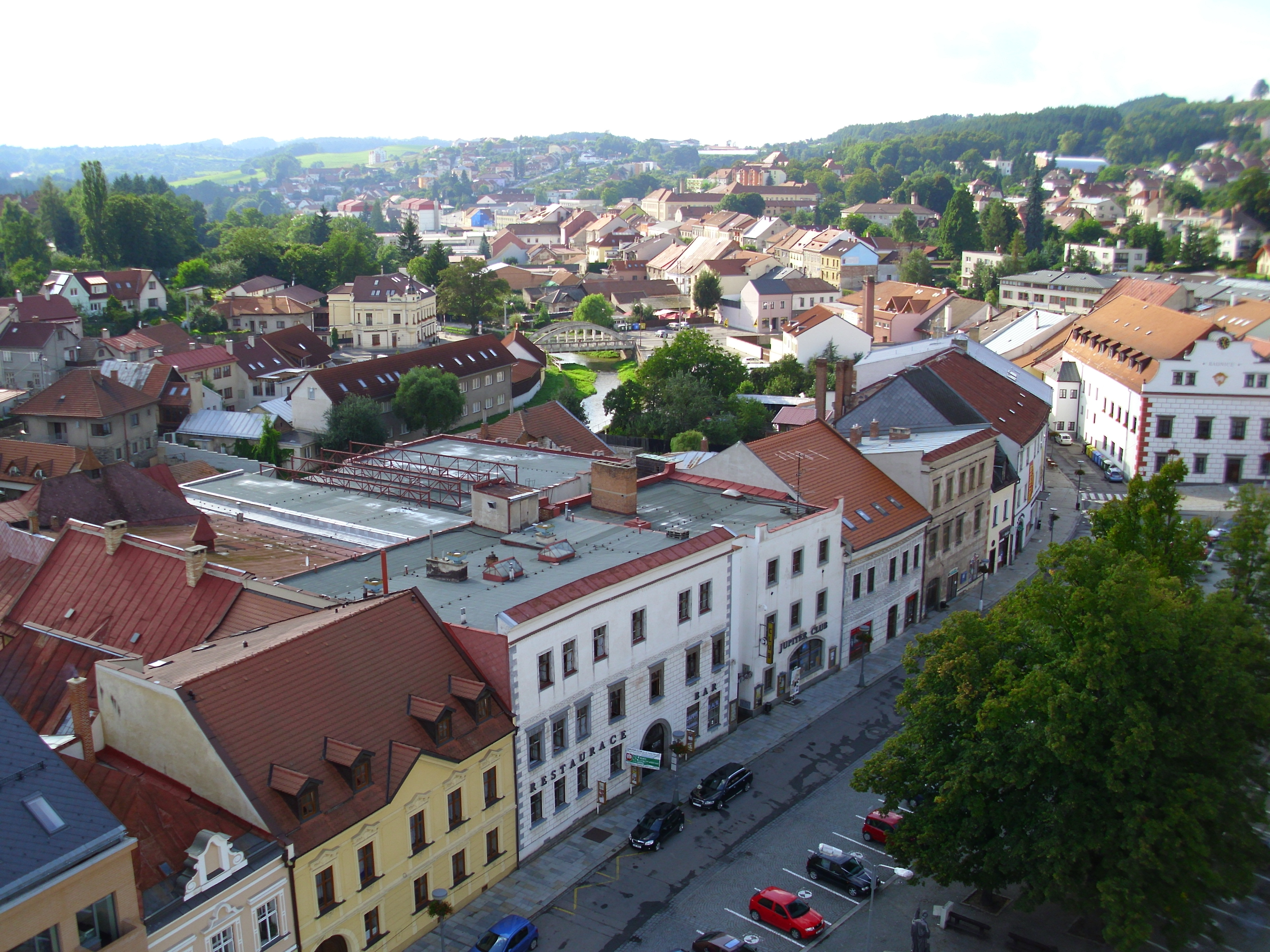
- General view

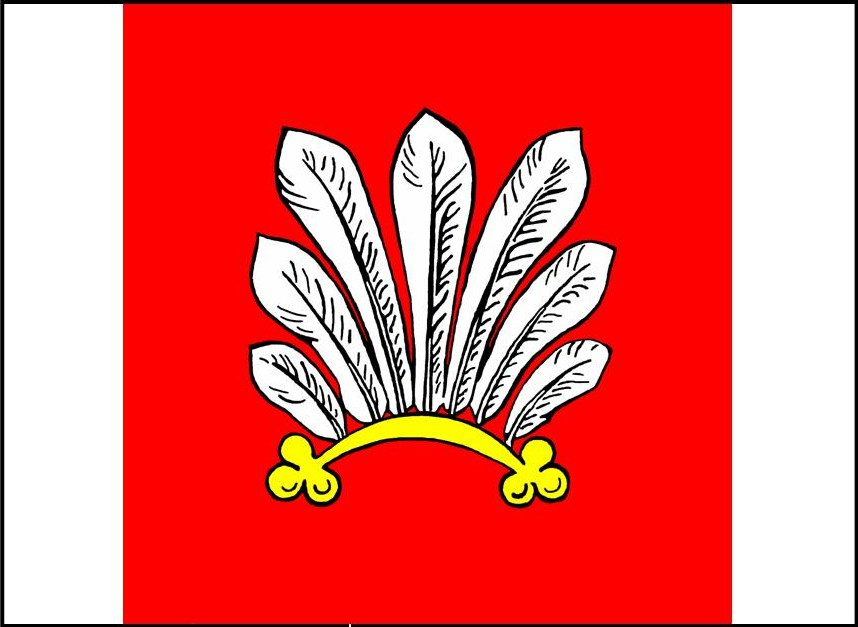
- Flag Coat of arms

- Location in the Czech Republic
- Coordinates: 49°21′19″N 16°0′44″E
- Country: Czech Republic
- Region: Vysočina
- District: Žďár nad Sázavou
- First mentioned: 1281

Government
  - Mayor: Alexandros Kaminaras

Area
  - Total: 40.66 km^{2} (15.70 sq mi)
- Elevation: 425 m (1,394 ft)

Population (2026-01-01)
  - Total: 11,709
  - Density: 288.0/km^{2} (745.8/sq mi)
- Time zone: UTC+1 (CET)
  - Summer (DST): UTC+2 (CEST)
- Postal code: 594 01
- Website: www.velkemezirici.cz

Velké Meziříčí (Czech pronunciation: [ˈvɛlkɛː ˈmɛzɪr̝iːtʃiː]; German: Groß Meseritsch) is a town in Žďár nad Sázavou District in the Vysočina Region of the Czech Republic. It has about 12,000 inhabitants. The town is located in the Křižanov Highlands, at the confluence of the rivers Oslava and Balinka.

Velké Meziříčí was founded in the 12th century. The main landmark of the town is the Velké Meziříčí Castle. The historic town centre with the castle complex is well preserved and is protected as an urban monument zone.

== Administrative division ==
Velké Meziříčí consists of eight municipal parts (in brackets population according to the 2021 census):

- Velké Meziříčí (9,841)
- Dolní Radslavice (89)
- Hrbov (165)
- Kúsky (83)
- Lhotky (271)
- Mostiště (572)
- Olší nad Oslavou (272)
- Svařenov (116)

== Etymology ==
The name Meziříčí literally means 'between the rivers' in Czech and is related to its location at the confluence of two rivers. The prefix Velké (i.e. 'great') was added later to distinguish from places with the same name.

== Geography ==
Velké Meziříčí is located about 23 kilometres (14 mi) south of Žďár nad Sázavou and 30 km (19 mi) east of Jihlava. It is situated in a valley framed by the hills of the Křižanov Highlands. It lies at the confluence of the Oslava and Balinka rivers. A system of fishponds is located on the stream Lovíčský potok, which flows into the Balinka in the town. Part of Mostiště Reservoir is located in the municipal territory.

== History ==
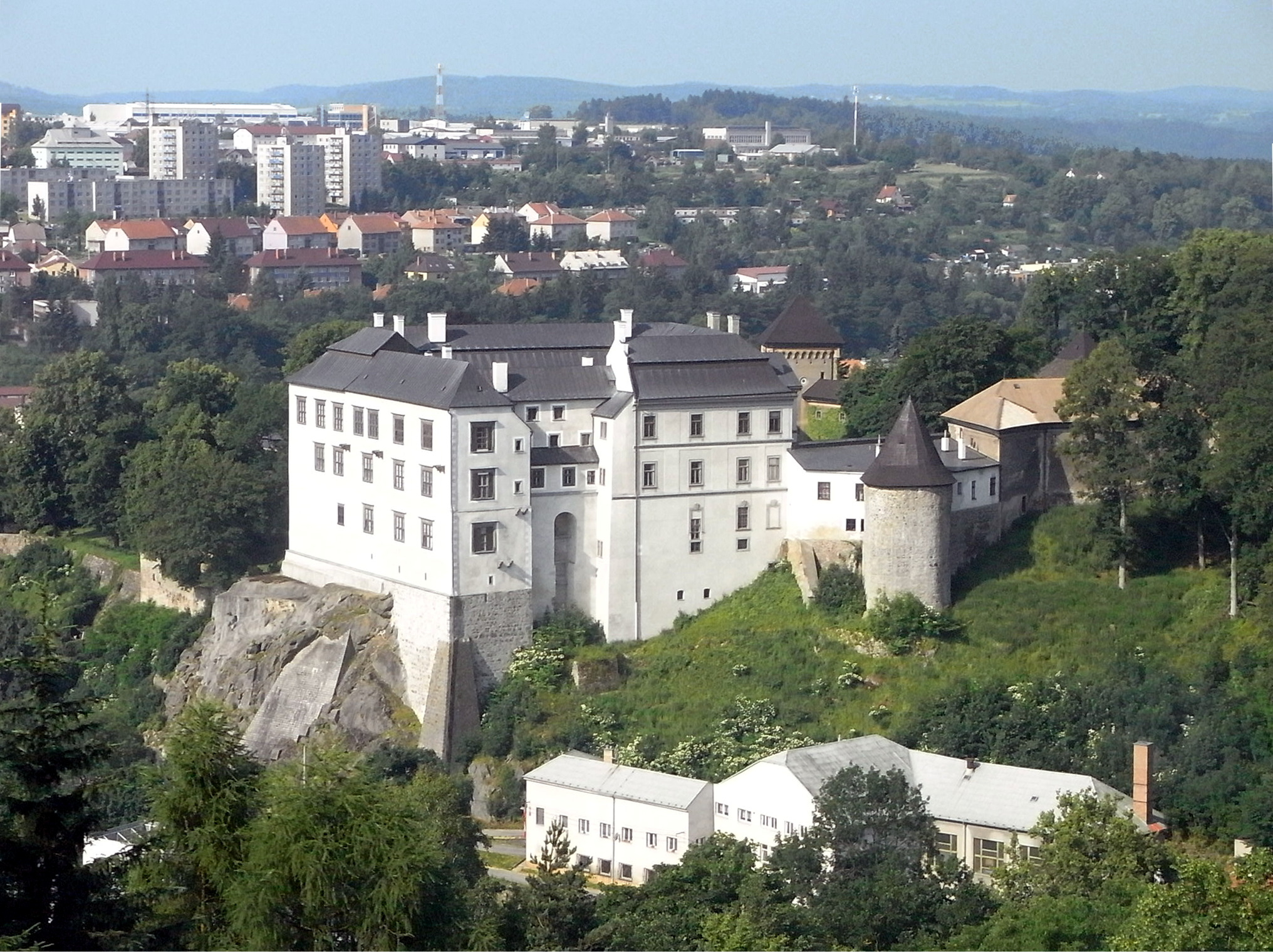
Velké Meziříčí Castle

The settlement of Meziříčí was founded during the colonisation of the Oslava valley in the 12th century. The first written credible mention of Meziříčí is from 1281. A counterfeit medieval document mentions the existence of Meziříčí in 1236 and even though it is a counterfeit, the foundation of the castle above Meziříčí is estimated actually around 1236, making it one of the oldest aristocratic castles in Moravia. The palisade and then the stone walls were built in the 14th century. The Church of Saint Nicholas was first mentioned in 1317. The village was located on crossroads of two trade routes and developed into a town.

After helping their lord to reclaim his castle from his enemies, the settlement was rewarded with full town privileges in 1408. During the Hussite Wars, Meziříčí was a military base of the Hussites. Around 1434, the castle fortifications were improved. In 1464, the castle was conquered by King George of Poděbrady, and in 1468, the town was ransacked by the army of Matthias Corvinus.

Meziříčí experienced the greatest boom during the Renaissance period. The first Jews came into the town in the late 15th century and the Jewish community was established in the 17th century. The prosperity of the town was interrupted by the Thirty Years' War, during which the town was burned down several times. In the 18th century, the town prospered again.

In the 19th century, first factories were built, and the development of the town's industry was also helped by the construction of the railway. In September 1909, the Imperial Maneuvers of the Austro-Hungarian Army were held near the town. It was visited by the Austrian Emperor Franz Joseph I and German Emperor Wilhelm II.

== Demographics ==
Historical population

Year	Pop.	±%
1869	6,792	—
1880	7,221	+6.3%
1890	7,021	−2.8%
1900	6,877	−2.1%
1910	6,959	+1.2%

Year	Pop.	±%
1921	7,335	+5.4%
1930	7,170	−2.2%
1950	7,676	+7.1%
1961	8,424	+9.7%
1970	9,091	+7.9%

Year	Pop.	±%
1980	10,505	+15.6%
1991	11,518	+9.6%
2001	11,811	+2.5%
2011	11,680	−1.1%
2021	11,409	−2.3%

Source: Censuses

== Economy ==
The largest industriual employers based in the town are Prysmian Kabely (manufacturer of cables and electric wires, part of Prysmian Group) and POEX Velké Meziříčí (food industry), both with more than 250 employees.

== Transport ==
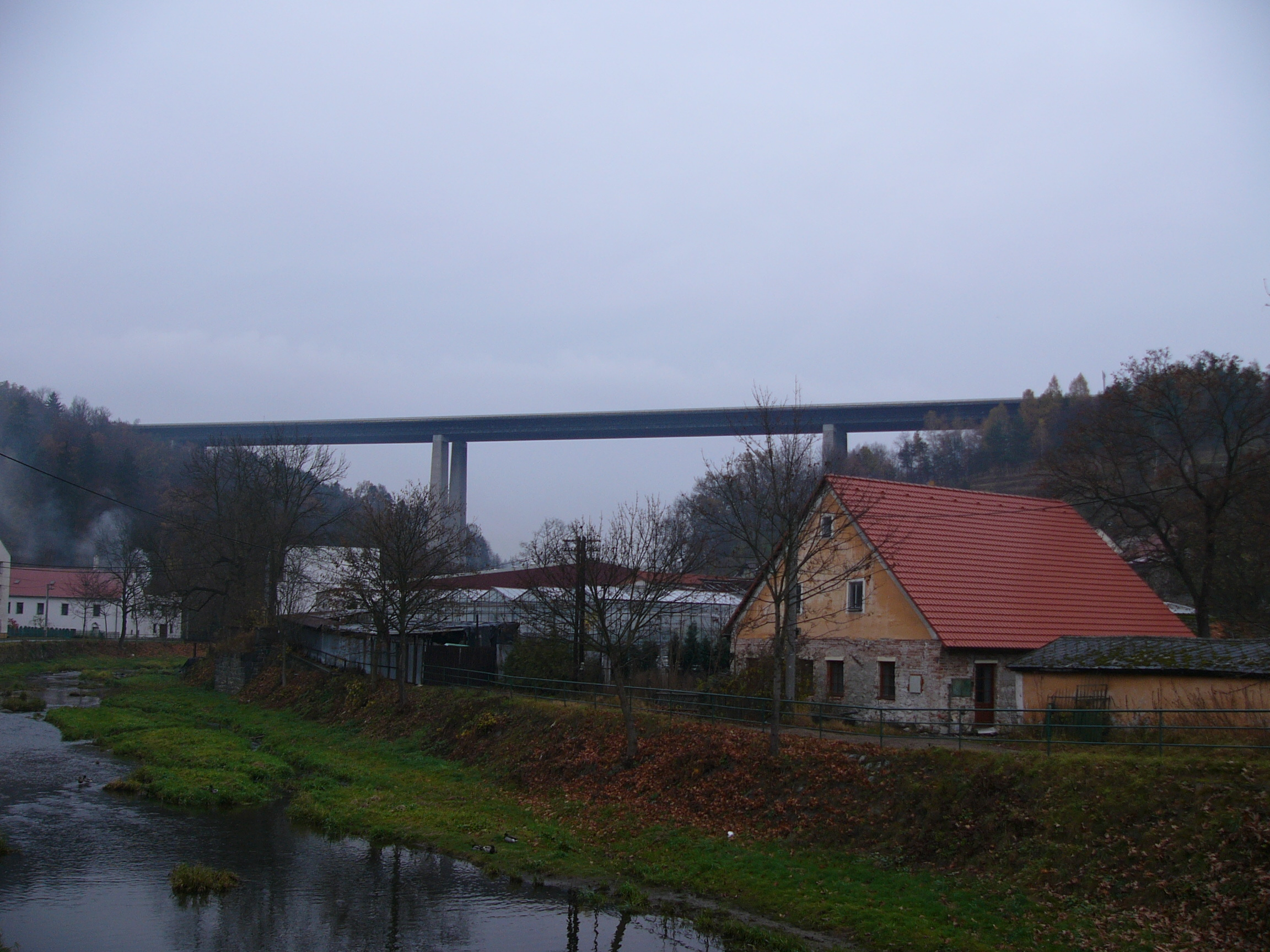
Vysočina Bridge

The D1 motorway from Prague to Brno runs through the town. The 425 metres (1,394 ft) long and 77 metres (253 ft) high Vysočina Bridge spans the built-up area.

Velké Meziříčí lies on the Křižanov–Studenec railway line of local importance.

== Sights ==
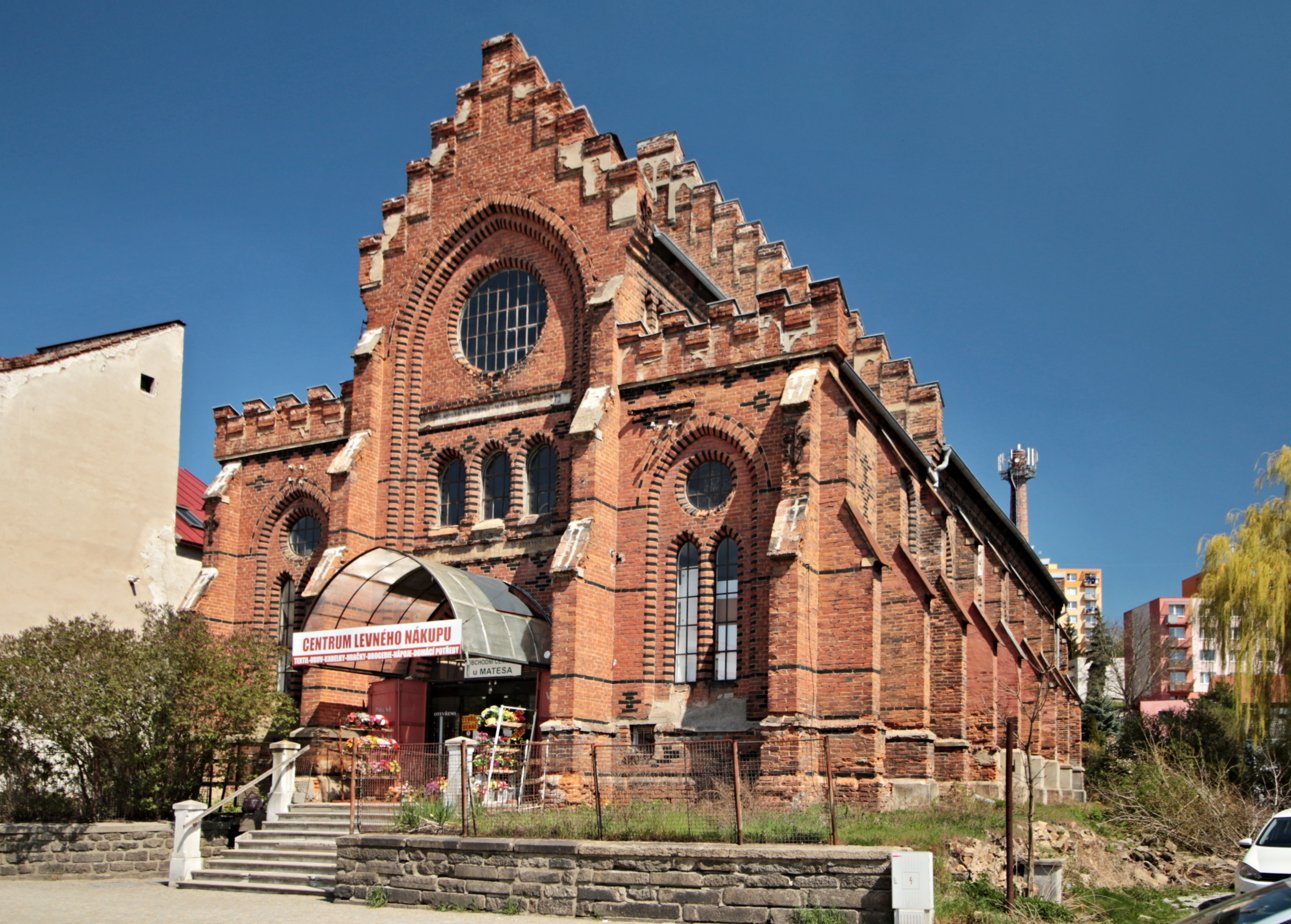
New Synagogue

The main landmark of the town is the Velké Meziříčí Castle. The original Romanesque-Gothic castle was rebuilt in the Renaissance style in the 16th century and after a fire in 1723, Baroque reconstruction was made. Today it houses the Velké Meziříčí Museum. The museum was founded in 1893 and includes historical and scientific collections, a collection of cubist furniture, and an exhibition on the construction of roads and bridges.

The historic centre was delimited by town walls and both rivers. Part of the town walls with a gate are preserved. The main landmark of the square is the Church of Saint Nicholas. This Gothic building comes probably from the 12th or 13th century and has a 64 metres (210 ft) high tower open to the public. The square is lined with valuable burgher houses; the most significant buildings are the town hall from the 15th century, and a house called Obecník with rich sgraffito decoration.

Several important monuments remained after the Jewish community. The Old Synagogue was built in 1695 and has a Baroque-Neoclassical portal of the main entrance from the late 18th century. The New Synagogue is from 1870 and is known for its characteristic appearance of unplastered red and black bricks. The Jewish cemetery with 1,101 tombstones comes from the mid-17th century. The oldest preserved tombstone is from 1677. The nearby ceremonial hall is from 1880.

== Notable people ==
- Vratislav II of Pernštejn (1530–1582), High Chancellor of Bohemia
- Adam Huber of Riesenpach (1545–1613), medical doctor
- Tzvi Ashkenazi (1656–1718), Jewish scholar, rabbi of Amsterdam
- Isaac Hirsch Weiss (1815–1905), literature historian
- Nathan Weiss (1851–1883), Austrian medical doctor and neurologist
- Arnold Pick (1851–1924), psychiatrist
- Růžena Vacková (1901–1982), art historian and theatre critic
- Jaroslava Blažková (1933–2017), Slovak writer

== Twin towns – sister cities ==
Velké Meziříčí is twinned with:

- České Meziříčí, Czech Republic
- Tisno, Croatia
- Valašské Meziříčí, Czech Republic
- Vansbro, Sweden

== Gallery ==
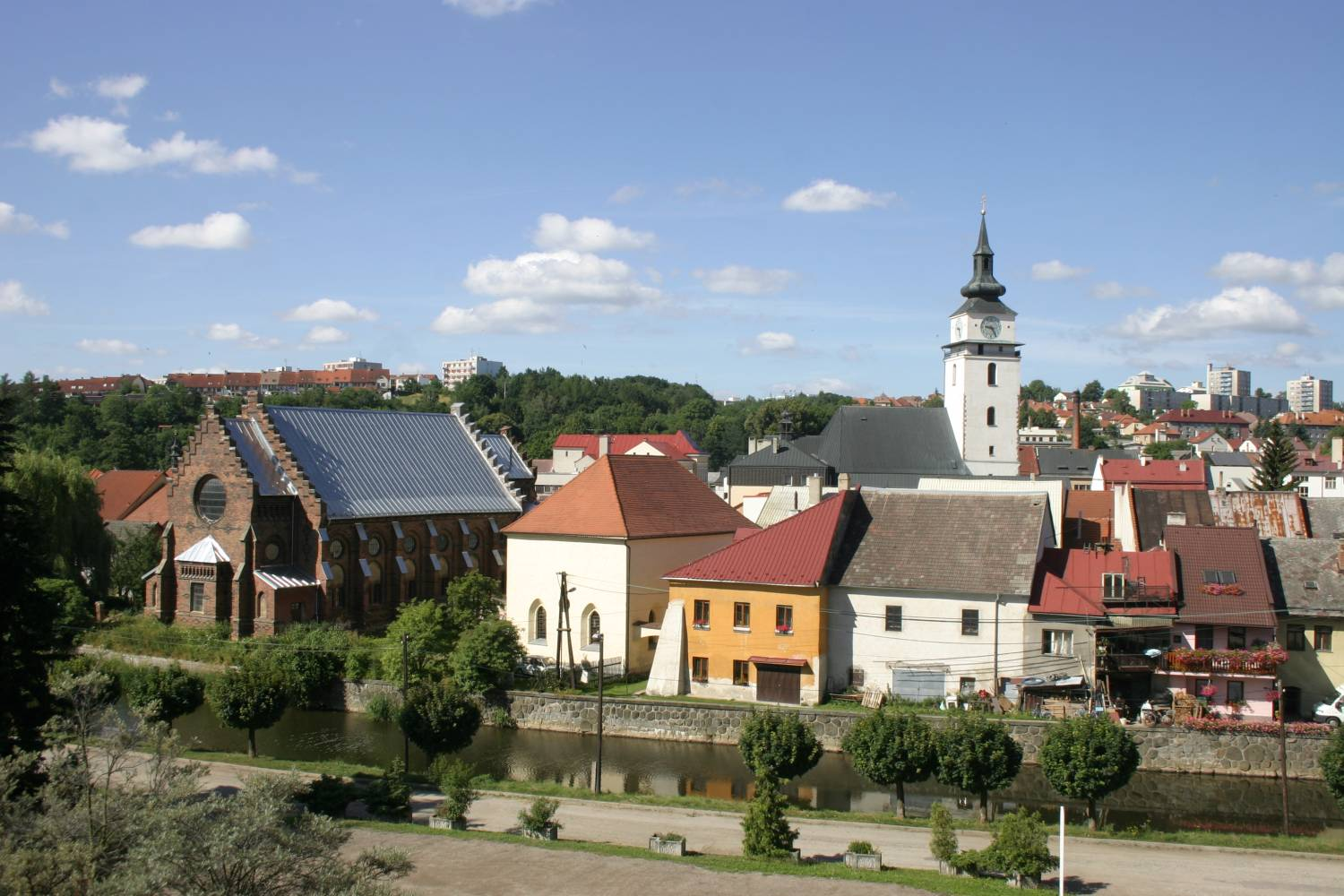
Centre of the town from the north

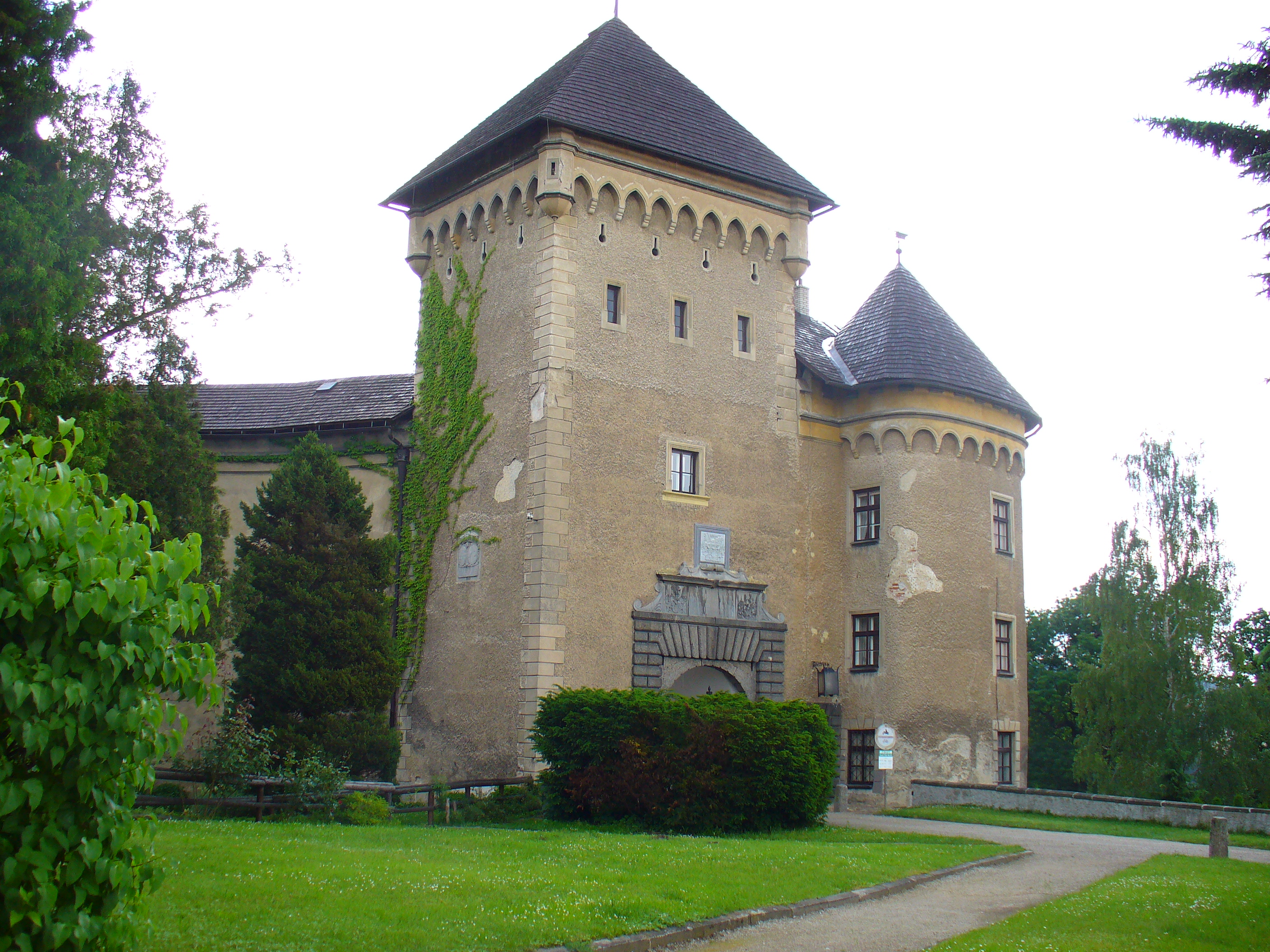
Main gate of the castle

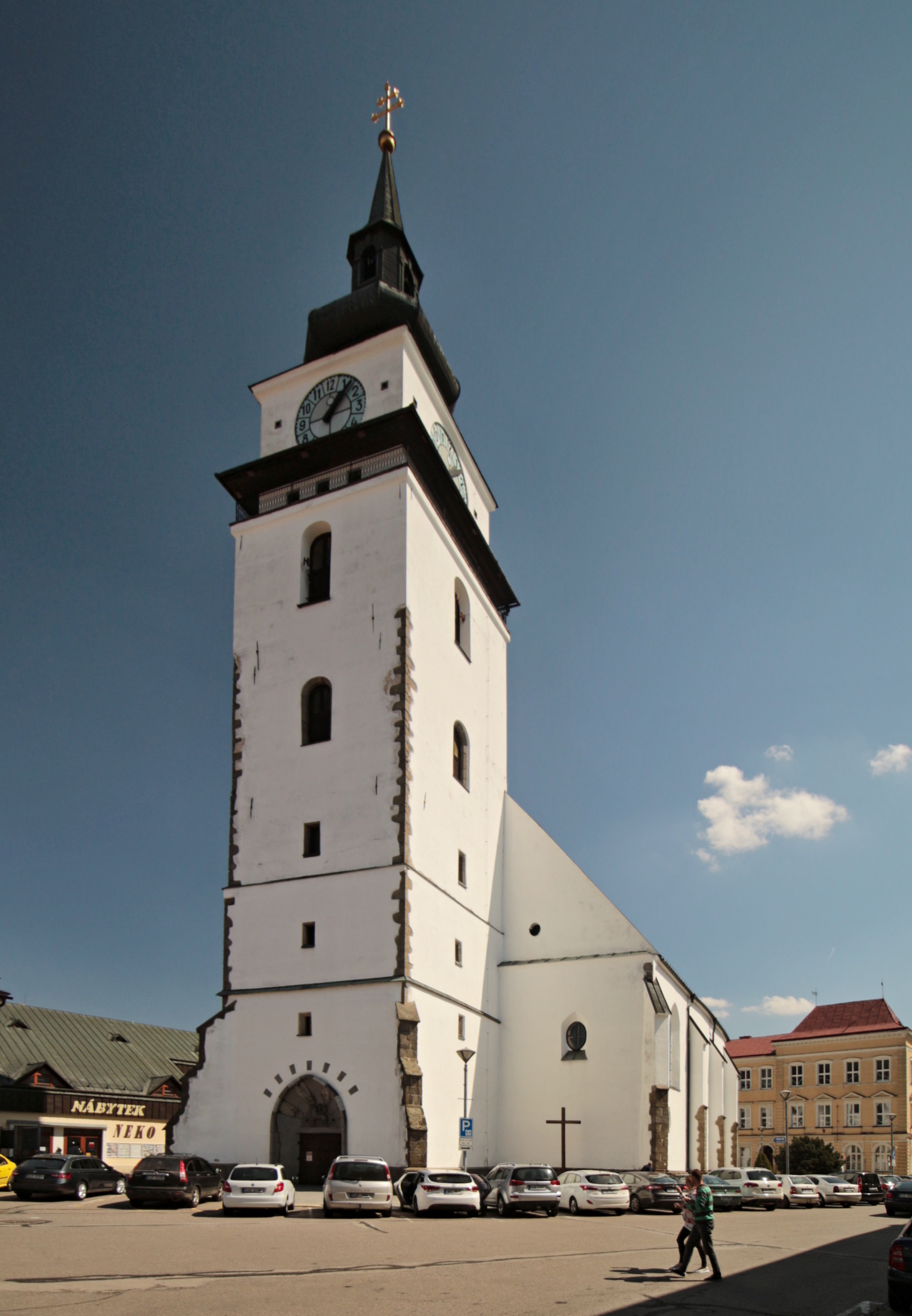
Church of Saint Nicholas

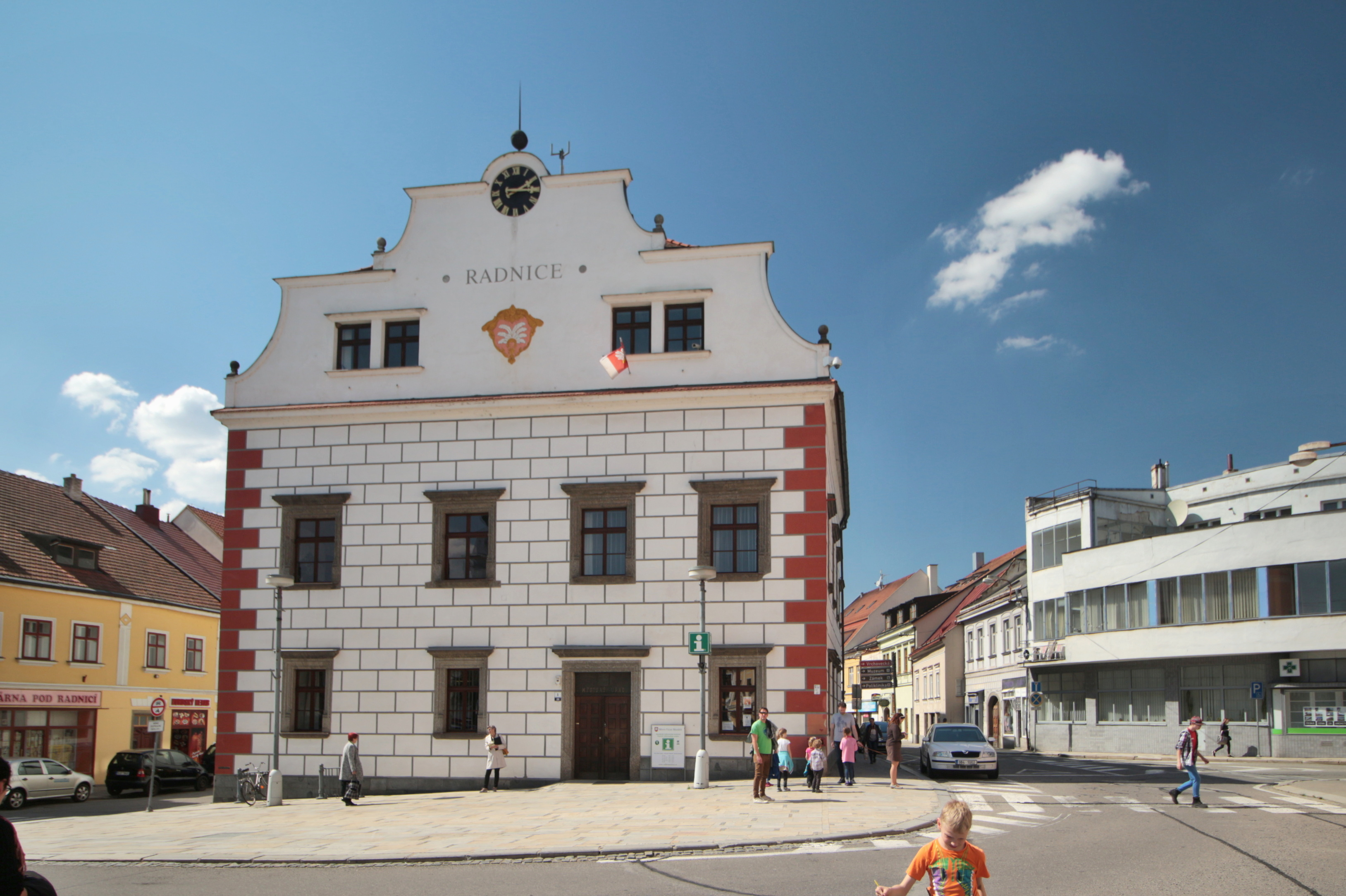
Town hall
