= Kozlov (Žďár nad Sázavou District) =

- Municipality
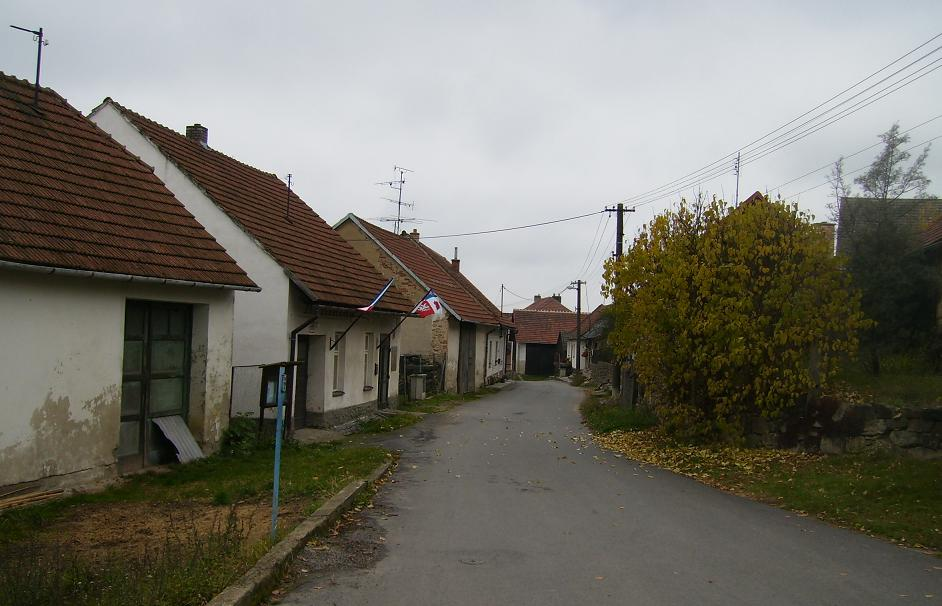
- A street with the municipal office

- Location in the Czech Republic
- Coordinates: 49°22′45″N 16°4′43″E
- Country: Czech Republic
- Region: Vysočina
- District: Žďár nad Sázavou
- First mentioned: 1396

Area
  - Total: 4.08 km^{2} (1.58 sq mi)
- Elevation: 538 m (1,765 ft)

Population (2026-01-01)
  - Total: 199
  - Density: 48.8/km^{2} (126/sq mi)
- Time zone: UTC+1 (CET)
  - Summer (DST): UTC+2 (CEST)
- Postal code: 594 51
- Website: www.kozlov.cz

Kozlov is a municipality and village in Žďár nad Sázavou District in the Vysočina Region of the Czech Republic. It has about 200 inhabitants.

Kozlov lies approximately 24 kilometres (15 mi) south-east of Žďár nad Sázavou, 36 km (22 mi) east of Jihlava, and 143 km (89 mi) south-east of Prague.

== Demographics ==
Historical population
Year	Pop.	±%
1869	120	—
1880	131	+9.2%
1890	135	+3.1%
1900	131	−3.0%
1910	137	+4.6%
1921	133	−2.9%
1930	137	+3.0%
1950	156	+13.9%
1961	228	+46.2%
1970	252	+10.5%
1980	241	−4.4%
1991	243	+0.8%
2001	230	−5.3%
2011	181	−21.3%
2021	172	−5.0%
Source: Censuses
