= Martinice (Kroměříž District) =

- Municipality
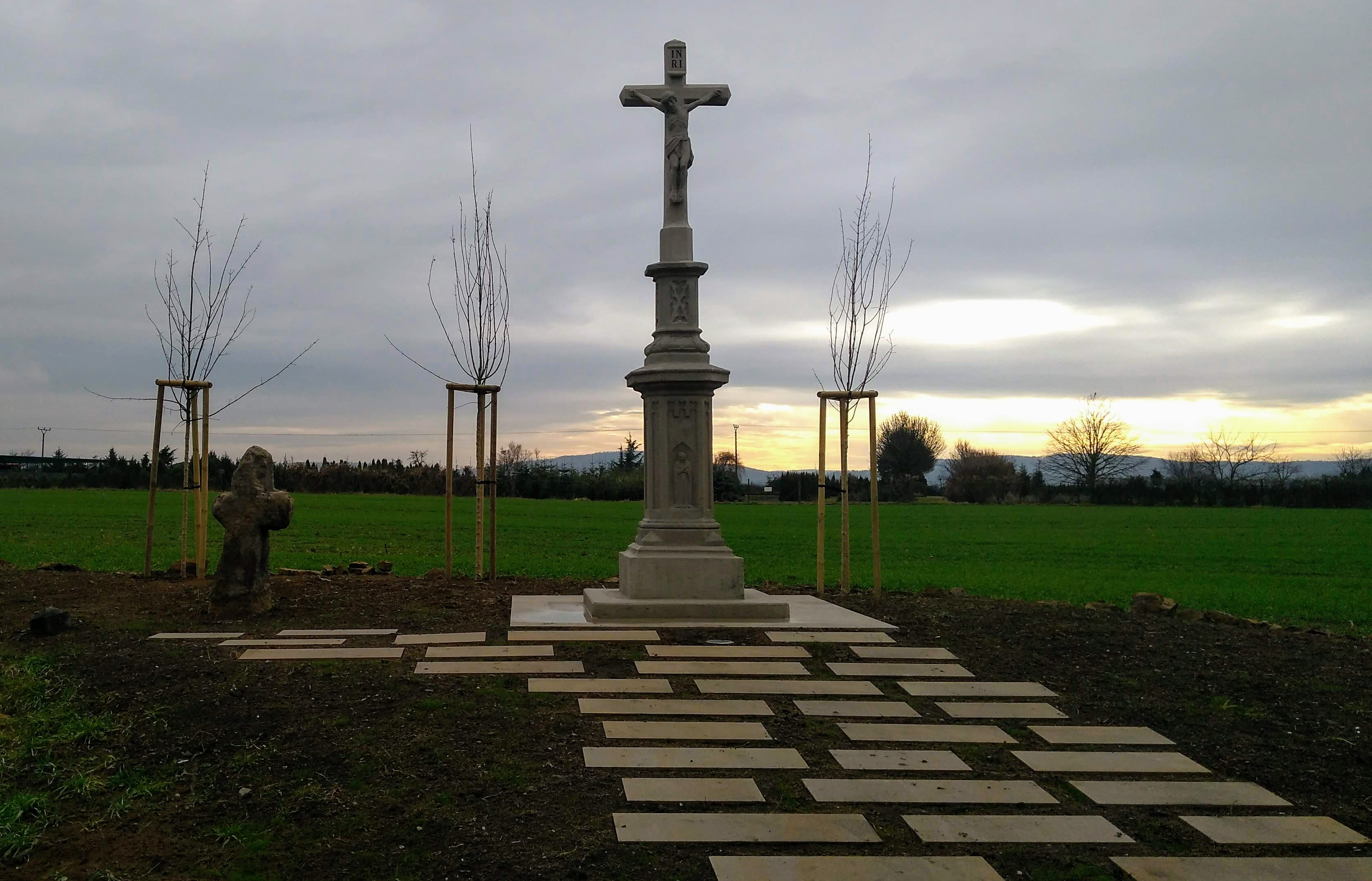
- Conciliation cross and crucifix

- Flag Coat of arms

- Location in the Czech Republic
- Coordinates: 49°18′37″N 17°36′4″E
- Country: Czech Republic
- Region: Zlín
- District: Kroměříž
- First mentioned: 1262

Area
  - Total: 4.76 km^{2} (1.84 sq mi)
- Elevation: 246 m (807 ft)

Population (2026-01-01)
  - Total: 861
  - Density: 181/km^{2} (468/sq mi)
- Time zone: UTC+1 (CET)
  - Summer (DST): UTC+2 (CEST)
- Postal code: 769 01
- Website: www.martinice.cz

Martinice is a municipality and village in Kroměříž District in the Zlín Region of the Czech Republic. It has about 900 inhabitants.

== Geography ==
Martinice is located about 14 kilometres (9 mi) east of Kroměříž and 10 km (6 mi) north of Zlín. Most of the municipal territory lies in a flat landscape in the Upper Morava Valley. The eastern part extends into the Vizovice Highlands and includes the highest point of Martinice at 307 m (1,007 ft) above sea level. The Mojena Stream flows through the municipality.

== History ==
The first written mention of Martinice is from 1262. During its feudal history, the village was owned by the archdiocese of Olomouc.

== Demographics ==
Historical population

Year	Pop.	±%
1869	433	—
1880	509	+17.6%
1890	514	+1.0%
1900	538	+4.7%
1910	580	+7.8%

Year	Pop.	±%
1921	571	−1.6%
1930	525	−8.1%
1950	521	−0.8%
1961	599	+15.0%
1970	586	−2.2%

Year	Pop.	±%
1980	590	+0.7%
1991	609	+3.2%
2001	657	+7.9%
2011	696	+5.9%
2021	811	+16.5%

Source: Censuses

== Transport ==
The short finished section of the D49 motorway connects Martinice with Hulín, where is the junction of the D1 and D55 motorways.

== Sights ==
The only protected cultural monument in the municipality is a stone conciliation cross from the first half of the 17th century. Next to the conciliation cross is a larger crucifix created in 1869.
