= Martinice u Onšova =

- Municipality
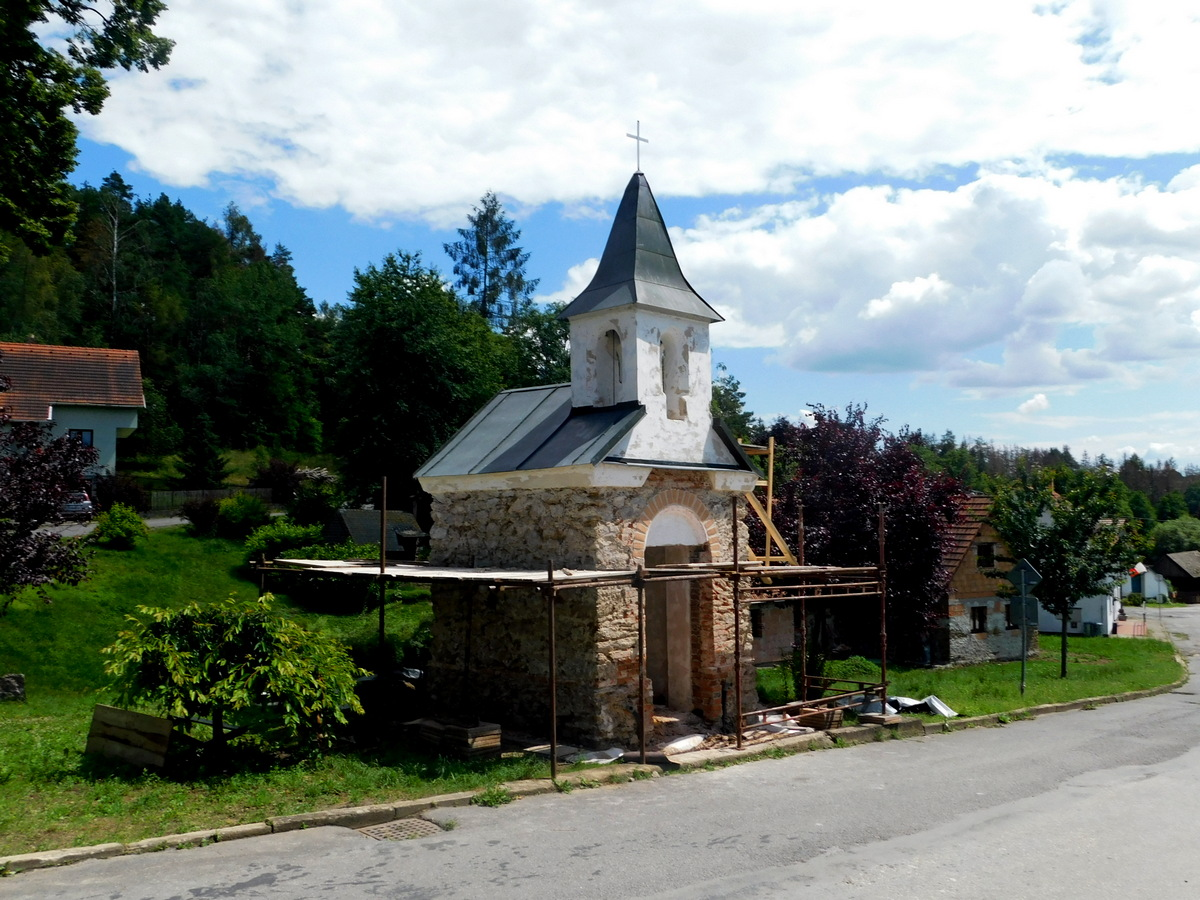
- Chapel

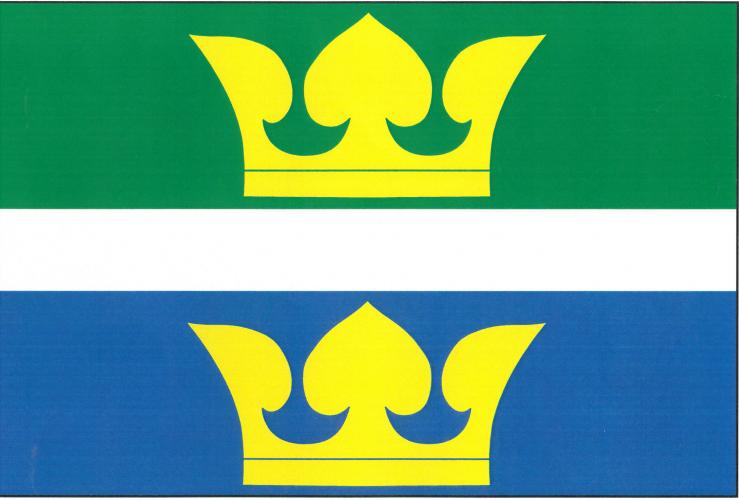
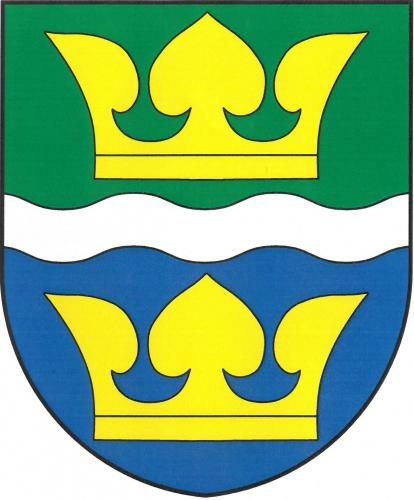
- Flag Coat of arms

- Location in the Czech Republic
- Coordinates: 49°34′48″N 15°6′56″E
- Country: Czech Republic
- Region: Vysočina
- District: Pelhřimov
- First mentioned: 1362

Area
  - Total: 4.69 km^{2} (1.81 sq mi)
- Elevation: 460 m (1,510 ft)

Population (2026-01-01)
  - Total: 52
  - Density: 11/km^{2} (29/sq mi)
- Time zone: UTC+1 (CET)
  - Summer (DST): UTC+2 (CEST)
- Postal code: 395 01
- Website: www.martiniceuonsova.cz

Martinice u Onšova is a municipality and village in Pelhřimov District in the Vysočina Region of the Czech Republic. It has about 50 inhabitants.

Martinice u Onšova lies approximately 19 kilometres (12 mi) north-west of Pelhřimov, 40 km (25 mi) north-west of Jihlava, and 76 km (47 mi) south-east of Prague.

== Administrative division ==
Martinice u Onšova consists of two municipal parts (in brackets population according to the 2021 census):

- Martinice u Onšova (34)
- Skoranovice (19)

== Demographics ==
Historical population
Year	Pop.	±%
1869	220	—
1880	205	−6.8%
1890	211	+2.9%
1900	207	−1.9%
1910	200	−3.4%
1921	194	−3.0%
1930	162	−16.5%
1950	124	−23.5%
1961	89	−28.2%
1970	82	−7.9%
1980	78	−4.9%
1991	62	−20.5%
2001	53	−14.5%
2011	49	−7.5%
2021	53	+8.2%
Source: Censuses
