= Matthias Borbonius =

Physician and epigrammatist (1566–1629)

Matthias Borbonius (Czech: Matyáš z Borbenheimu; 1566–1629) was a physician and Neo-Latin epigrammatist of Bohemian or Czech origin who was sometime protomedicus (chief physician) to Władysław IV Vasa. He produced a series of mottoes for various Roman and Holy Roman Emperors, printed in Deliciæ Poetarum Germanorum (Frankfurt, 1612), and is connected with the Latin saying Tempora mutantur ('Times are changed').

== Bibliography ==
- Gellner, Gustav (1938). "Životopis lékaře Borbonia a výklad jeho deníků". Nákladem České akademie věd a umění. Prague: 263.
- Svatoš, Michal (2019). "Borbonius z Borbenheimu Matyáš 24.8.1566-16.12.1629". Biografický slovník (online ed.). Historický ústav Akademie věd ČR.
