= Okarec =

- Municipality
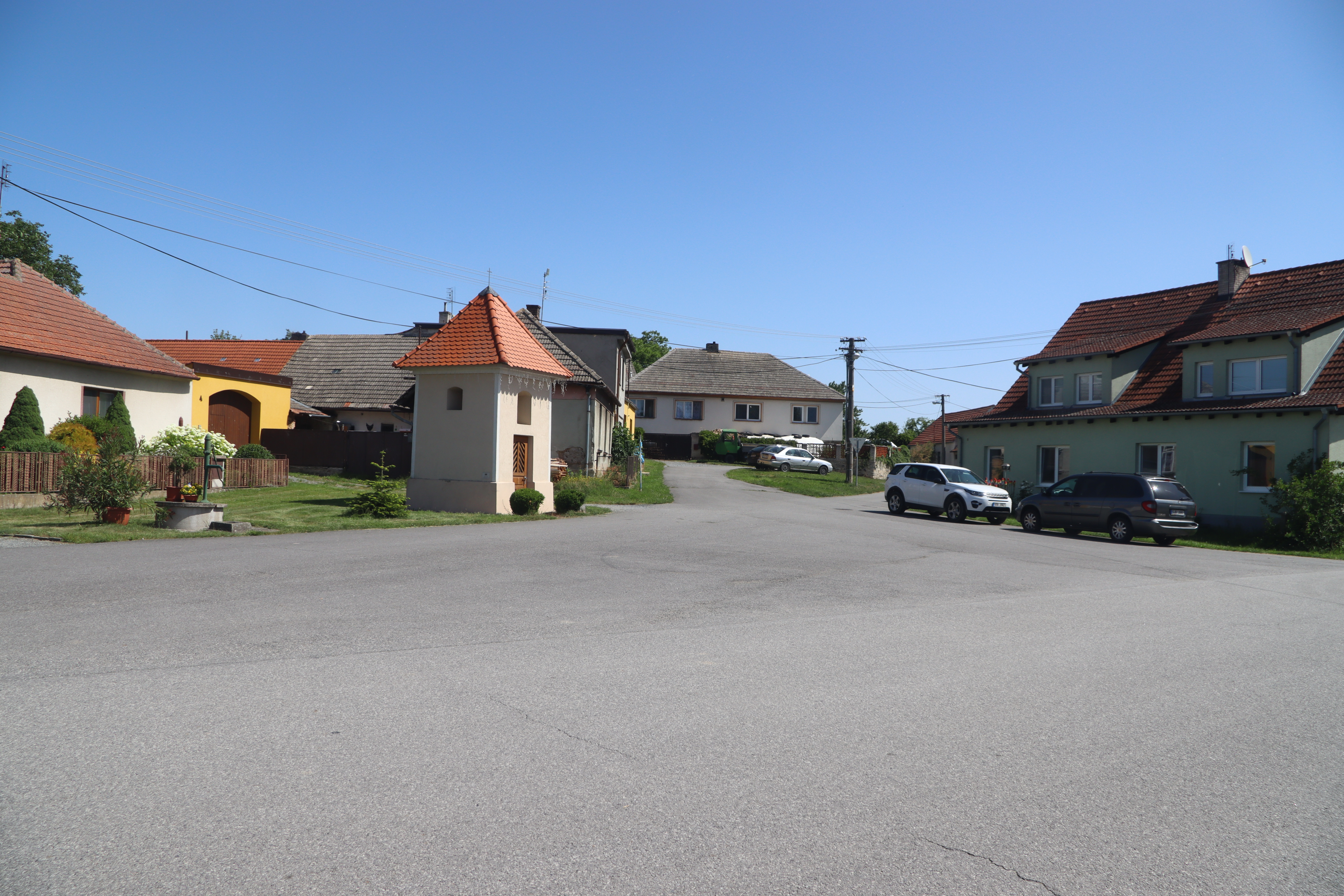
- Centre of Okarec

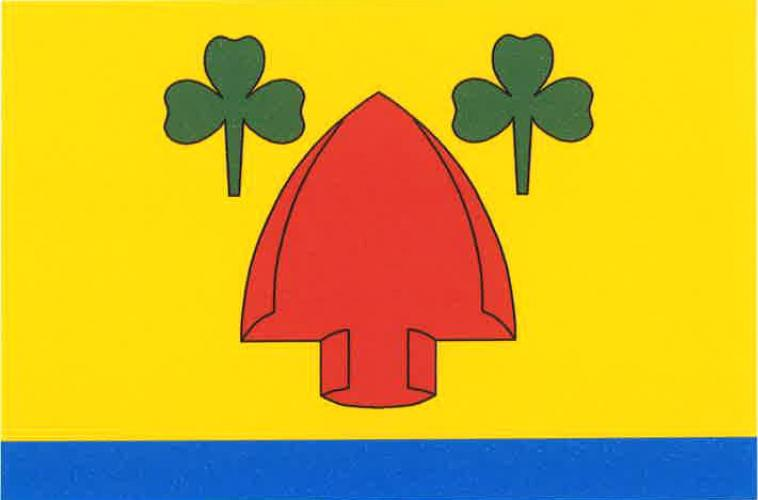
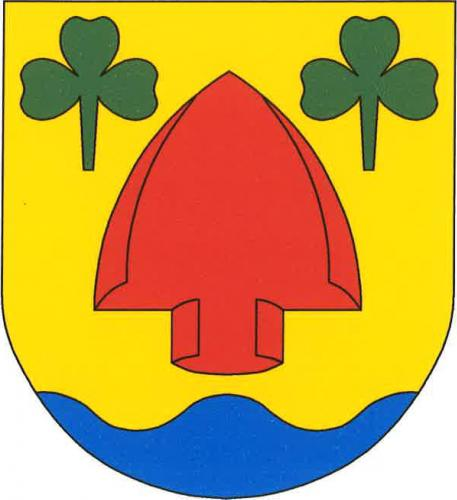
- Flag Coat of arms

- Location in the Czech Republic
- Coordinates: 49°12′22″N 16°5′17″E
- Country: Czech Republic
- Region: Vysočina
- District: Třebíč
- First mentioned: 1104

Area
  - Total: 4.32 km^{2} (1.67 sq mi)
- Elevation: 417 m (1,368 ft)

Population (2026-01-01)
  - Total: 97
  - Density: 22/km^{2} (58/sq mi)
- Time zone: UTC+1 (CET)
  - Summer (DST): UTC+2 (CEST)
- Postal code: 675 02
- Website: www.obecokarec.cz

Okarec is a municipality and village in Třebíč District in the Vysočina Region of the Czech Republic. It has about 100 inhabitants.

Okarec lies approximately 16 kilometres (10 mi) east of Třebíč, 42 km (26 mi) south-east of Jihlava, and 155 km (96 mi) south-east of Prague.

== Demographics ==
Historical population
Year	Pop.	±%
1869	139	—
1880	175	+25.9%
1890	195	+11.4%
1900	200	+2.6%
1910	219	+9.5%
1921	210	−4.1%
1930	219	+4.3%
1950	161	−26.5%
1961	170	+5.6%
1970	177	+4.1%
1980	150	−15.3%
1991	134	−10.7%
2001	126	−6.0%
2011	121	−4.0%
2021	108	−10.7%
Source: Censuses
