= Křižanov (Žďár nad Sázavou District) =

- Market town
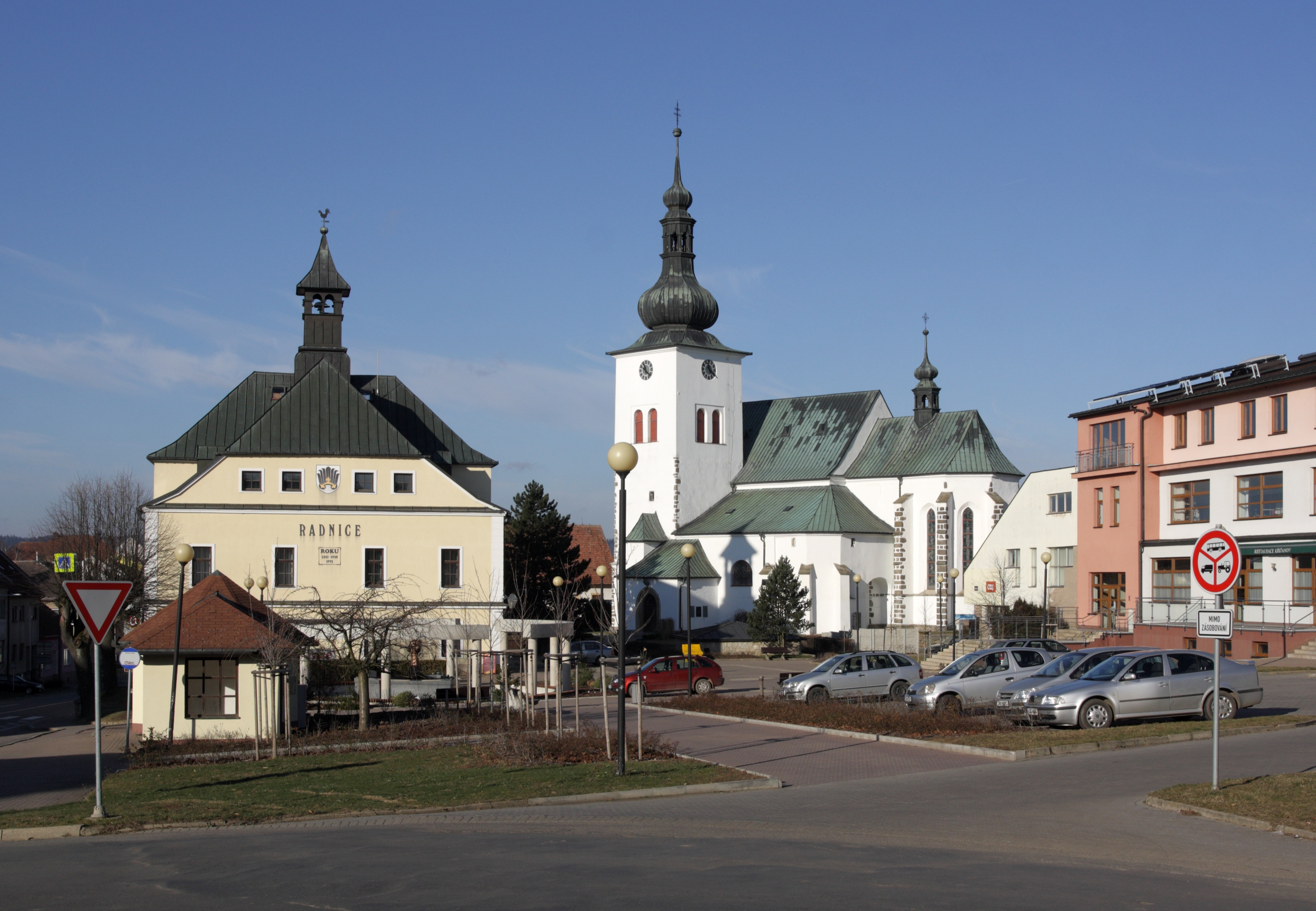
- Town square

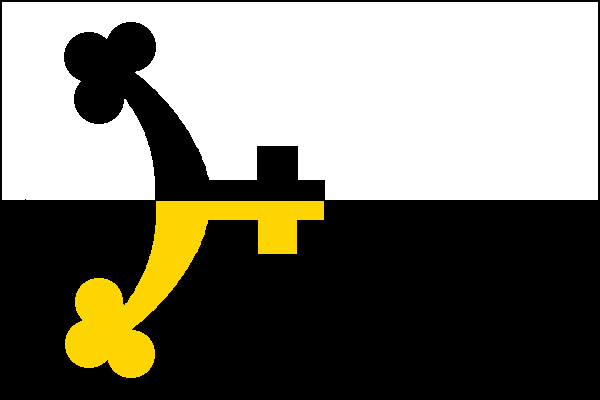
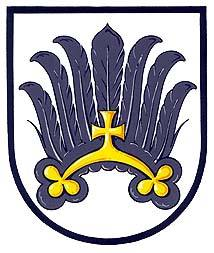
- Flag Coat of arms

- Location in the Czech Republic
- Coordinates: 49°23′19″N 16°6′35″E
- Country: Czech Republic
- Region: Vysočina
- District: Žďár nad Sázavou
- First mentioned: 1239

Area
  - Total: 13.64 km^{2} (5.27 sq mi)
- Elevation: 527 m (1,729 ft)

Population (2026-01-01)
  - Total: 1,811
  - Density: 132.8/km^{2} (343.9/sq mi)
- Time zone: UTC+1 (CET)
  - Summer (DST): UTC+2 (CEST)
- Postal code: 594 51
- Website: www.krizanov.cz

Křižanov (Czech pronunciation: [ˈkr̝̊ɪʒanof]) is a market town in Žďár nad Sázavou District in the Vysočina Region of the Czech Republic. It has about 1,800 inhabitants.

== Administrative division ==
Křižanov consists of two municipal parts (in brackets population according to the 2021 census):

- Křižanov (1,744)
- Bojanov (29)

Bojanov forms an exclave of the municipal territory.

== Geography ==
Křižanov is located about 23 kilometres (14 mi) southeast of Žďár nad Sázavou and 39 km (24 mi) northwest of Brno. It lies in the Křižanov Highlands. The highest point is at 587 m (1,926 ft) above sea level. The Libochovka River flows through the market town. The municipal territory is rich in fishponds.

== History ==
The first written mention of Křižanov is from 1239. From 1297, Křižanov was referred to as a market town. The most notable owners of the estate was the Pernštejn family (1486–1560). They established fishponds here and helped the economic prosperity of Křižanov.

== Demographics ==
Historical population

Year	Pop.	±%
1869	1,705	—
1880	1,671	−2.0%
1890	1,578	−5.6%
1900	1,543	−2.2%
1910	1,587	+2.9%

Year	Pop.	±%
1921	1,472	−7.2%
1930	1,358	−7.7%
1950	1,358	+0.0%
1961	1,513	+11.4%
1970	1,547	+2.2%

Year	Pop.	±%
1980	1,637	+5.8%
1991	1,788	+9.2%
2001	1,848	+3.4%
2011	1,846	−0.1%
2021	1,773	−4.0%

Source: Censuses

== Transport ==
The I/37 road, which connects the D1 motorway with Žďár nad Sázavou and continues to Pardubice, runs through Křižanov.

Křižanov is served by the train station named Křižanov on the lines Prague–Brno, Hustopeče–Křižanov and Velké Meziříčí–Křižanov, which is located in neighbouring Kozlov.

== Sights ==
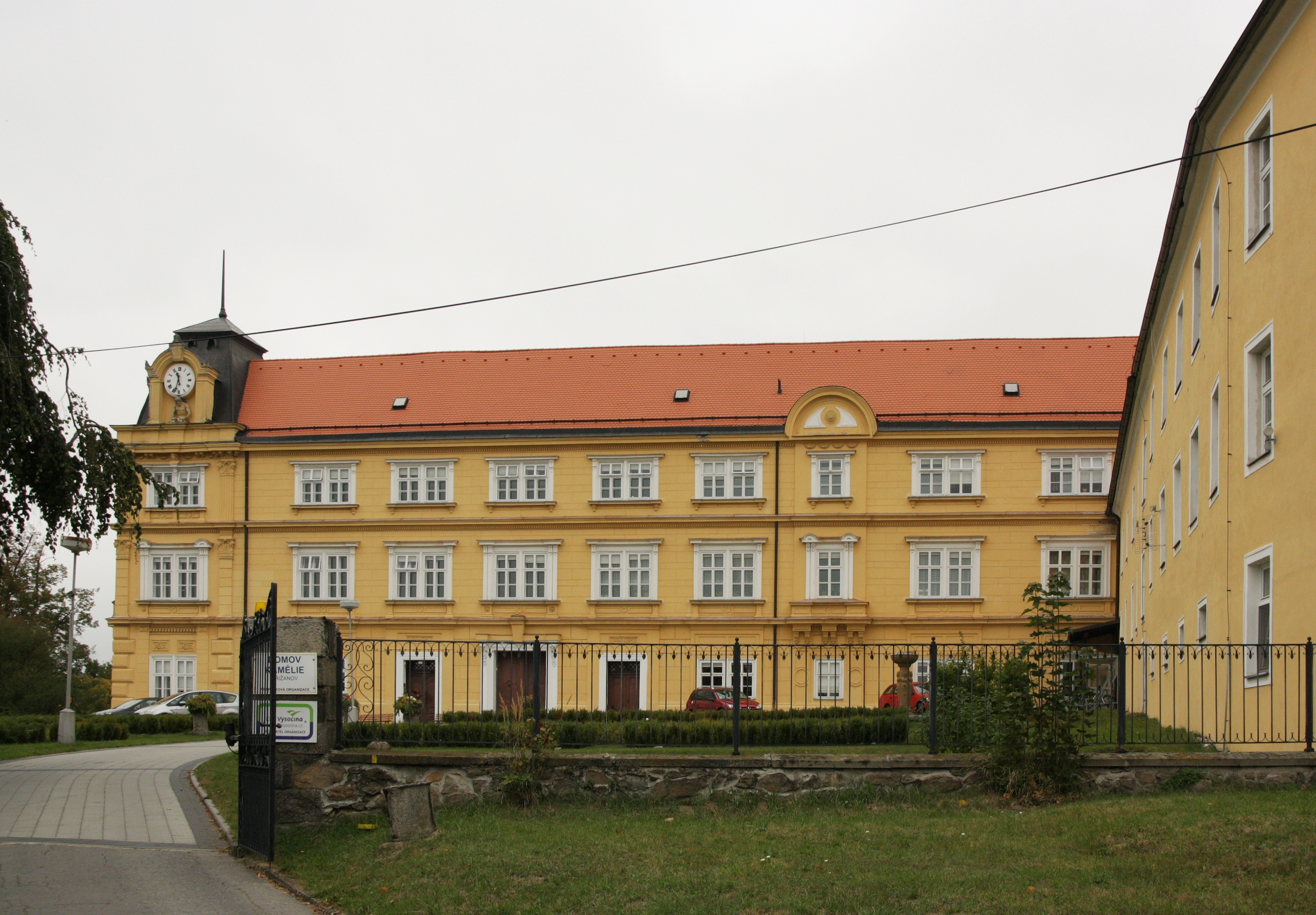
Křižanov Castle

The Church of Saint Wenceslaus on the town square is an architecturally valuable Gothic building from the second half of the 14th century, when it replaced an old Romanesque church. The church was originally fortified.

The second landmark of the town square is the town hall. It is a massive free-standing building with a turret. It has undergone a complicated construction development.

The Křižanov Castle has a Renaissance core, but its current appearance dates from the 1860s. Today, the institute of social welfare is located there.

== Notable people ==
- Zdislava Berka (c. 1220 – 1252), saint
- Bedřich Bloudek (1815–1875), military leader
