= Studenec (Třebíč District) =

- Municipality
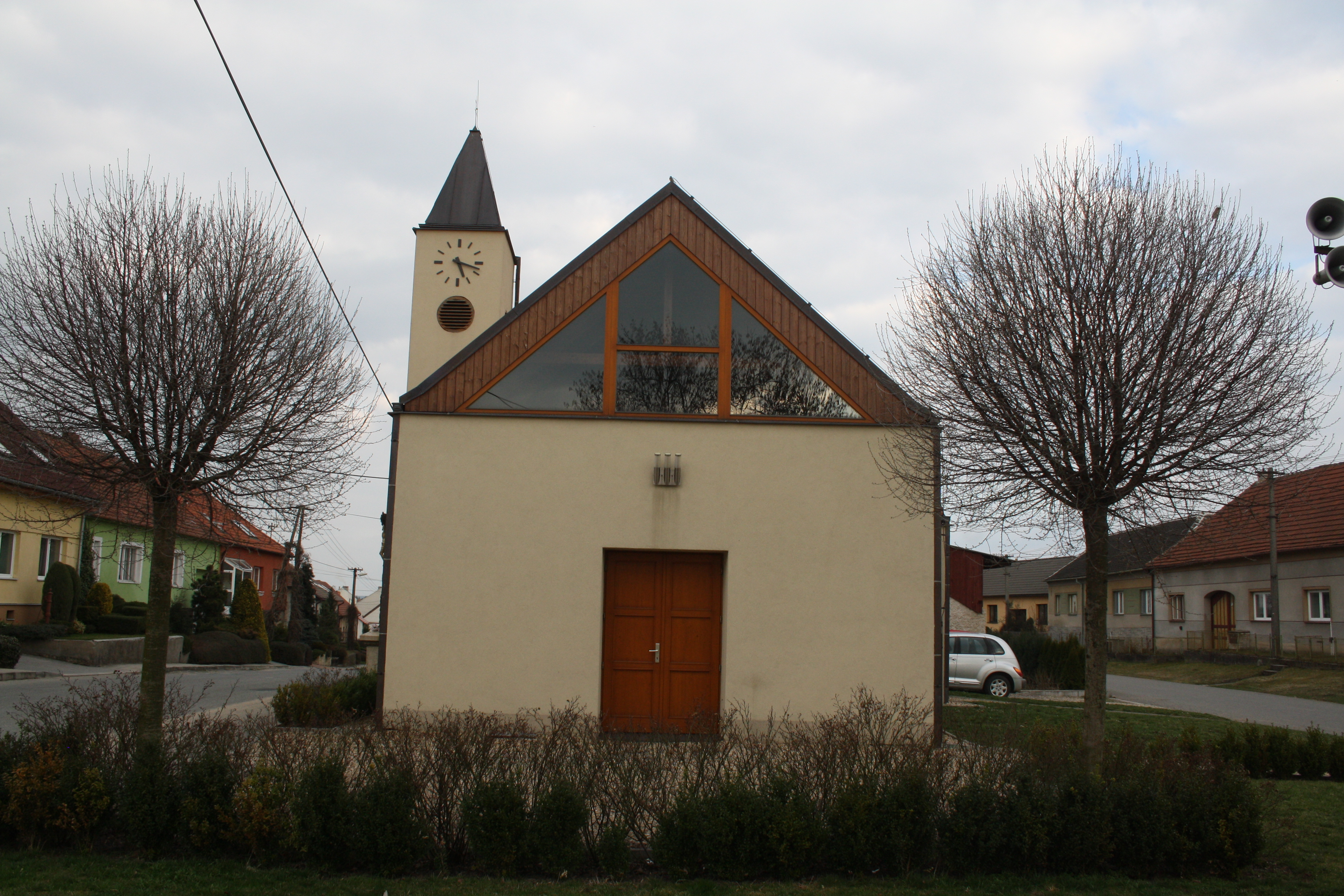
- Chapel of Saint Wenceslaus

- Flag Coat of arms

- Location in the Czech Republic
- Coordinates: 49°12′0″N 16°3′53″E
- Country: Czech Republic
- Region: Vysočina
- District: Třebíč
- First mentioned: 1104

Area
  - Total: 12.61 km^{2} (4.87 sq mi)
- Elevation: 446 m (1,463 ft)

Population (2026-01-01)
  - Total: 626
  - Density: 49.6/km^{2} (129/sq mi)
- Time zone: UTC+1 (CET)
  - Summer (DST): UTC+2 (CEST)
- Postal code: 675 02
- Website: www.obecstudenec.cz

Studenec is a municipality and village in Třebíč District in the Vysočina Region of the Czech Republic. It has about 600 inhabitants.

Studenec lies approximately 15 kilometres (9 mi) east of Třebíč, 42 km (26 mi) south-east of Jihlava, and 155 km (96 mi) south-east of Prague.

== Demographics ==
Historical population
Year	Pop.	±%
1869	444	—
1880	486	+9.5%
1890	560	+15.2%
1900	613	+9.5%
1910	583	−4.9%
1921	535	−8.2%
1930	660	+23.4%
1950	600	−9.1%
1961	643	+7.2%
1970	651	+1.2%
1980	582	−10.6%
1991	570	−2.1%
2001	556	−2.5%
2011	546	−1.8%
2021	570	+4.4%
Source: Censuses
