= List of common Japanese surnames =

Officially, among Japanese names there are 291,129 different Japanese surnames (姓, sei), as determined by their kanji, although many of these are pronounced and romanized similarly. Conversely, some surnames written the same in kanji may also be pronounced differently. The top 10 surnames cover approximately 10% of the population, while the top 100 surnames cover slightly more than 33%.

This ranking is a result of an August 2008 study by Meiji Yasuda Life Insurance Company, which included approximately 6,118,000 customers of Meiji Yasuda's insurance and annuities.

== List ==
Rank	Name		2008 estimates	
Rank	Kanji	Romaji	Numbers	%
1	佐藤	Satō	1,990,000	1.57
2	鈴木	Suzuki	1,900,000	1.50
3	高橋	Takahashi	1,470,000	1.16
4	田中	Tanaka	1,340,000	1.06
5	渡辺	Watanabe	1,200,000	0.95
6	伊藤	Itō	1,150,000	0.91
7	中村	Nakamura	1,080,000	0.85
8	小林	Kobayashi	1,060,000	0.84
9	山本	Yamamoto	1,020,000	0.81
10	加藤	Katō	920,000	0.73
11	吉田	Yoshida	850,000	—
12	山田	Yamada	820,000	—
13	佐々木	Sasaki	710,000	—
14	山口	Yamaguchi	640,000	—
15	松本	Matsumoto	630,000	—
16	井上	Inoue	600,000	—
17	木村	Kimura	580,000	—
18	清水	Shimizu	560,000	—
19	林	Hayashi	550,000	—
20	斉藤	Saitō	530,000	—
21	斎藤	Saitō	520,000	—
22	山崎	Yamazaki; Yamasaki	490,000	—
23	中島	Nakajima; Nakashima	480,000	—
24	森	Mori	470,000	—
25	阿部	Abe	470,000	—
26	池田	Ikeda	450,000	—
27	橋本	Hashimoto	450,000	—
28	石川	Ishikawa	440,000	—
29	山下	Yamashita	410,000	—
30	小川	Ogawa	410,000	—
31	石井	Ishii	400,000	—
32	長谷川	Hasegawa	390,000	—
33	後藤	Gotō	390,000	—
34	岡田	Okada	380,000	—
35	近藤	Kondō	370,000	—
36	前田	Maeda	370,000	—
37	藤田	Fujita	370,000	—
38	遠藤	Endō	360,000	—
39	青木	Aoki	350,000	—
40	坂本	Sakamoto	350,000	—
41	村上	Murakami	340,000	—
42	太田	Ōta	320,000	—
43	金子	Kaneko	310,000	—
44	藤井	Fujii	310,000	—
45	福田	Fukuda	300,000	—
46	西村	Nishimura	300,000	—
47	三浦	Miura	300,000	—
48	竹内	Takeuchi	290,000	—
49	中川	Nakagawa	290,000	—
50	岡本	Okamoto	290,000	—
51	松田	Matsuda	290,000	—
52	原田	Harada	290,000	—
53	中野	Nakano	290,000	—
54	小野	Ono	280,000	—
55	田村	Tamura	280,000	—
56	藤原	Fujiwara; Fujihara	270,000	—
57	中山	Nakayama	270,000	—
58	石田	Ishida	270,000	—
59	小島	Kojima	260,000	—
60	和田	Wada	260,000	—
61	森田	Morita	250,000	—
62	内田	Uchida	250,000	—
63	柴田	Shibata	250,000	—
64	酒井	Sakai	240,000	—
65	原	Hara	240,000	—
66	高木	Takagi; Takaki	240,000	—
67	横山	Yokoyama	240,000	—
68	安藤	Andō	240,000	—
69	宮崎	Miyazaki; Miyasaki	240,000	—
70	上田	Ueda; Ueta	240,000	—
71	島田	Shimada	230,000	—
72	工藤	Kudō	230,000	—
73	大野	Ōno	220,000	—
74	宮本	Miyamoto	220,000	—
75	杉山	Sugiyama	220,000	—
76	今井	Imai	220,000	—
77	丸山	Maruyama	210,000	—
78	増田	Masuda	210,000	—
79	高田	Takada; Takata	210,000	—
80	村田	Murata	210,000	—
81	平野	Hirano	210,000	—
82	大塚	Ōtsuka	210,000	—
83	菅原	Sugawara; Sugahara	210,000	—
84	武田	Takeda; Taketa	200,000	—
85	新井	Arai	200,000	—
86	小山	Koyama; Oyama	200,000	—
87	野口	Noguchi	200,000	—
88	桜井	Sakurai	200,000	—
89	千葉	Chiba	200,000	—
90	岩崎	Iwasaki	200,000	—
91	佐野	Sano	200,000	—
92	谷口	Taniguchi	200,000	—
93	上野	Ueno	200,000	—
94	松井	Matsui	190,000	—
95	河野	Kōno; Kawano	190,000	—
96	市川	Ichikawa	190,000	—
97	渡部	Watanabe; Watabe	190,000	—
98	野村	Nomura	180,000	—
99	菊地	Kikuchi	180,000	—
100	木下	Kinoshita	180,000	—
