= Takada =

Takada (高田, "high ricefield") may refer to:

== People ==
- Takada (surname)

== Places ==
- Takada, Tokyo an area in Toshima, Tokyo.
- Takada, Niigata former name of Joetsu, Niigata.
- Bungo Takada, Ōita
- Yamato Takada, Nara.

== Organizations ==
- Takada is a branch of the Jodo Shinshu Buddhist tradition

== See also ==
- Takata Station (disambiguation)
- Takata (disambiguation)
- Takeda (disambiguation)
