= Sakurai =

Sakurai may refer to:

== Places ==
- Sakurai, Nara, a city located in Nara Prefecture, Japan
  - Sakurai Line, a railway line operated by West Japan Railway Company in Nara Prefecture
  - Sakurai Station (Nara), a railway station in Sakurai, Nara Prefecture, Japan
- Sakurai Station (Aichi), a railway station in the city of Anjō, Aichi, Japan, operated by Meitetsu
- Sakurai Station (Osaka), a train station in Minoh, Osaka Prefecture, Japan

== People ==
- Sakurai (surname)

== Other uses ==
- Sakurai Prize, presented by the American Physical Society at its April annual meeting, honoring outstanding achievements in particle physics theory
- Sakurai or Sakurai and Napolitano, nicknames by which the textbook Modern Quantum Mechanics is often known
- Sakurai reaction, the chemical reaction of carbon electrophiles with allylic silanes catalyzed by strong Lewis acids
- Sakurai's Object, a star in the constellation of Sagittarius

== See also ==
- Sakura (disambiguation)
