= Carbon-burning process =

Nuclear fusion type found in older stars

The carbon-burning process or carbon fusion is a set of nuclear fusion reactions that take place in the cores of massive stars (at least 4 M_{☉} at birth) that combines carbon into other elements. It requires high temperatures (>5×10^{8} K or 50 keV) and densities (>3×10^{9} kg/m^{3}).

These figures for temperature and density are only a guide. More massive stars burn their nuclear fuel more quickly, since they have to offset greater gravitational forces to stay in (approximate) hydrostatic equilibrium. That generally means higher temperatures, although lower densities, than for less massive stars. To get the right figures for a particular mass, and a particular stage of evolution, it is necessary to use a numerical stellar model computed with computer algorithms. Such models are continually being refined based on nuclear physics experiments (which measure nuclear reaction rates) and astronomical observations (which include direct observation of mass loss, detection of nuclear products from spectrum observations after convection zones develop from the surface to fusion-burning regions – known as dredge-up events – and so bring nuclear products to the surface, and many other observations relevant to models).

== Fusion reactions ==
The principal reactions are:

^{12}_{6}C	+	^{12}_{6}C	→	^{20}_{10}Ne	+	^{4}_{2}He	+	4.617 MeV
^{12}_{6}C	+	^{12}_{6}C	→	^{23}_{11}Na	+	^{1}_{1}H	+	2.241 MeV
^{12}_{6}C	+	^{12}_{6}C	→	^{23}_{12}Mg	+	^{1}n	−	2.599 MeV
Alternatively:
^{12}_{6}C	+	^{12}_{6}C	→	^{24}_{12}Mg	+	γ	+	13.933 MeV
^{12}_{6}C	+	^{12}_{6}C	→	^{16}_{8}O	+	2 ^{4}_{2}He	− 0.113 MeV

== Reaction products ==
This sequence of reactions can be understood by thinking of the two interacting carbon nuclei as coming together to form an excited state of the ^{24}Mg nucleus, which then decays in one of the five ways listed above. The first two reactions are strongly exothermic, as indicated by the large positive energies released, and are the most frequent results of the interaction. The third reaction is strongly endothermic, as indicated by the large negative energy indicating that energy is absorbed rather than emitted. This makes it much less likely, yet still possible in the high-energy environment of carbon burning. But the production of a few neutrons by this reaction is important, since these neutrons can combine with heavy nuclei, present in tiny amounts in most stars, to form even heavier isotopes in the s-process.

The fourth reaction might be expected to be the most common from its large energy release, but in fact it is extremely improbable because it proceeds via electromagnetic interaction, as it produces a gamma ray photon, rather than utilising the strong force between nucleons as do the first two reactions. Nucleons look a lot bigger to each other than they do to photons of this energy. However, the ^{24}Mg produced in this reaction is the only magnesium left in the core when the carbon-burning process ends, as ^{23}Mg is radioactive.

The last reaction is also very unlikely since it involves three reaction products, as well as being endothermic — think of the reaction proceeding in reverse, it would require the three products all to converge at the same time, which is less likely than two-body interactions.

The protons produced by the second reaction can take part in the proton–proton chain reaction, or the CNO cycle, but they can also be captured by ^{23}Na to form ^{20}Ne plus a ^{4}He nucleus. In fact, a significant fraction of the ^{23}Na produced by the second reaction gets used up this way. In stars between 4 and 11 solar masses, the ^{16}O already produced by helium fusion in the previous stage of stellar evolution manages to survive the carbon-burning process pretty well, despite some of it being used up by capturing ^{4}He nuclei. So the result of carbon burning is a mixture mainly of oxygen, neon, sodium and magnesium.

The fact that the mass-energy sum of the two carbon nuclei is similar to that of an excited state of the magnesium nucleus is known as 'resonance'. Without this resonance, carbon burning would only occur at temperatures one hundred times higher. The experimental and theoretical investigation of such resonances is still a subject of research. A similar resonance increases the probability of the triple-alpha process, which is responsible for the original production of carbon.

== Neutrino losses ==
Neutrino losses start to become a major factor in the fusion processes in stars at the temperatures and densities of carbon burning. Though the main reactions don't involve neutrinos, the side reactions such as the proton–proton chain reaction do. But the main source of neutrinos at these high temperatures involves a process in quantum theory known as pair production. A high energy gamma ray which has a greater energy than the rest mass of two electrons (mass-energy equivalence) can interact with electromagnetic fields of the atomic nuclei in the star, and become a particle and anti-particle pair of an electron and positron.

Normally, the positron quickly annihilates with another electron, producing two photons, and this process can be safely ignored at lower temperatures. But around 1 in 10^{19} pair productions end with a weak interaction of the electron and positron, which replaces them with a neutrino and anti-neutrino pair. Since they move at virtually the speed of light and interact very weakly with matter, these neutrino particles usually escape the star without interacting, carrying away their mass-energy. This energy loss is comparable to the energy output from the carbon fusion.

Neutrino losses, by this and similar processes, play an increasingly important part in the evolution of the most massive stars. They force the star to burn its fuel at a higher temperature to offset them. Fusion processes are very sensitive to temperature so the star can produce more energy to retain hydrostatic equilibrium, at the cost of burning through successive nuclear fuels ever more rapidly. Fusion produces less energy per unit mass as the fuel nuclei get heavier, and the core of the star contracts and heats up when switching from one fuel to the next, so both these processes also significantly reduce the lifetime of each successive fusion-burning fuel.

Up to the helium burning stage the neutrino losses are negligible. But from the carbon burning stage onwards, the reduction in stellar lifetime due to energy lost in the form of neutrinos roughly matches the increased energy production due to fuel change and core contraction. In successive fuel changes in the most massive stars, the reduction in lifetime is dominated by the neutrino losses. For example, a star of 25 solar masses burns hydrogen in the core for 10^{7} years, helium for 10^{6} years and carbon for only 10^{3} years.

== Stellar evolution ==
During helium fusion, stars build up an inert core rich in carbon and oxygen. The inert core eventually reaches sufficient mass to collapse due to gravitation, whilst the helium burning moves gradually outward. This decrease in the inert core volume raises the temperature to the carbon ignition temperature. This will raise the temperature around the core and allow helium to burn in a shell around the core. Outside this is another shell burning hydrogen. The resulting carbon burning provides energy from the core to restore the star's mechanical equilibrium. However, the balance is only short-lived; in a star of 25 solar masses, the process will use up most of the carbon in the core in only 600 years. The duration of this process varies significantly depending on the mass of the star.

Stars of below 4 solar masses never reach high enough core temperature to burn carbon, instead ending their lives as carbon-oxygen white dwarfs after shell helium flashes gently expel the outer envelope in a planetary nebula.

In stars with masses between 8 and 10 solar masses, the carbon-oxygen core is under degenerate conditions and carbon ignition takes place in a carbon flash, that lasts just milliseconds and disrupts the stellar core. In the late stages of this nuclear burning they develop a massive stellar wind, which quickly ejects the outer envelope in a planetary nebula leaving behind an O-Ne-Na-Mg white dwarf core of about 1.1 solar masses. The core never reaches high enough temperature for further fusion burning of heavier elements than carbon.

Stars of more than 8 solar masses start carbon burning in a non-degenerate core, and after carbon exhaustion proceed with the neon-burning process once contraction of the inert (O, Ne, Na, Mg) core raises the temperature sufficiently.

== See also ==
- Alpha process
- Carbon detonation
- CNO cycle
- Neon-burning process
- Proton–proton chain reaction
- Triple-alpha process
