= 14 Canis Minoris =

Star in the constellation Canis Minor

- Location of 14 Canis Minoris (circled in red)

Observation data Epoch J2000 Equinox J2000
- Constellation: Canis Minor
- Right ascension: 07^{h} 58^{m} 20.6565^{s}
- Declination: +02° 13′ 29.156″
- Apparent magnitude (V): +5.30

Characteristics
- Evolutionary stage: red clump
- Spectral type: G8 IIIb
- B−V color index: 0.933±0.005

Astrometry
Radial velocity (R_{v})	+42.61±0.20 km/s
Proper motion (μ)	RA: −156.144 mas/yr Dec.: +98.798 mas/yr
Parallax (π)	13.50±0.34 mas
Distance	242 ± 6 ly (74 ± 2 pc)
Absolute magnitude (M_{V})	0.95

Details
Mass	2.54±0.11 M_{☉}
Radius	8.66±0.70 R_{☉}
Luminosity	48+12 −10 L_{☉}
Surface gravity (log g)	3.10±0.06 cgs
Temperature	5,070±17 K
Metallicity [Fe/H]	0.02±0.04 dex
Age	550±60 Myr

Other designations
- BD+02°1833, GC 10776, HD 65345, HIP 38962, HR 3110, SAO 116182, CCDM 07584+0213, WDS J07583+0213A

Database references
SIMBAD	data

14 Canis Minoris, also known as HD 65345, is a single star in the equatorial constellation of Canis Minor. It is faintly visible to the naked eye with an apparent visual magnitude of +5.30. The distance to this star, as determined from an annual parallax shift of 13.50±0.34 mas, is approximately 242 light years. 14 CMI has a relatively large proper motion, traversing the celestial sphere at the rate of 0.188 arcsecond/year. It is moving further from the Sun with heliocentric radial velocity of +42.6 km/s.

This is an evolved G-type giant star with a stellar classification of G8 IIIb. At the age of around 550 million years old, it is a red clump giant, which means it has already undergone helium flash and is generating energy through helium fusion at its core. The star has an estimated 2.5 times the mass of the Sun and has expanded to 8.7 times the Sun's radius. It is radiating roughly 48 times the Sun's luminosity from its enlarged photosphere at an effective temperature of 5,070 K.
