= FG Sagittae =

Star in the constellation Sagitta

Observation data Epoch J2000.0 Equinox ICRS
- Constellation: Sagitta
- Right ascension: 20^{h} 11^{m} 56.05947^{s}
- Declination: +20° 20′ 04.3672″
- Apparent magnitude (V): 8.7 - 23.0

Characteristics
- Spectral type: (O3 -) B4Ieq - K2Ib
- U−B color index: +0.75
- B−V color index: +1.21

Astrometry
Parallax (π)	0.7630±0.2302 mas
Distance	approx. 4,000 ly (approx. 1,300 pc)

Details
Mass	0.8 M_{☉}
Radius	0.9 - 184 R_{☉}
Luminosity	2,692- 12,000 L_{☉}
Surface gravity (log g)	0.2 - 2.2 cgs
Temperature	4,467 - 45,000 K

Other designations
- FG Sge, HIP 99527, PN ARO 169, ALS 10924, IRAS 20097+2010, PN G060.3-07.3, AN 377.1943, Hen 3-1844, JP11 5474, CSI+20-20097, Hen 2-457, LS II +20 19, TYC 1626-619-1, CSV 5066, Hen 1-5, 2MASS J20115606+2020044, UBV M 50884, PK 060-07 1, AAVSO 2007+20

Database references
SIMBAD	data

FG Sagittae is a supergiant star in the constellation Sagitta at a distance of 4000 light-years. When first noted in 1943, it was identified to be a variable star, and it was found to be a hot, blue star of stellar spectral type B in 1955. Since then it has expanded and cooled, becoming a yellow G-type star by 1991, and then further cooling to become an orange K-type star. It started to pulsate when becoming an A-type star with a period of 15 days. This period later increased to over 100 days.

Since 1992 the star has exhibited fadings and recoveries similar to that of a R Coronae Borealis variable star; this behavior is emphasized by a hydrogen deficiency typical for this class of stars. It has been proposed that this star has undergone a late thermal pulse (LTP) of helium fusion after having left the asymptotic giant branch (AGB) to move towards the hottest end of the "white dwarf cooling track". This thermal pulse is believed to have revived this aged star to once again, for a short time, behave as an AGB star.

FG Sagittae is the central star of the planetary nebula Henize 1-5.

== Observations ==
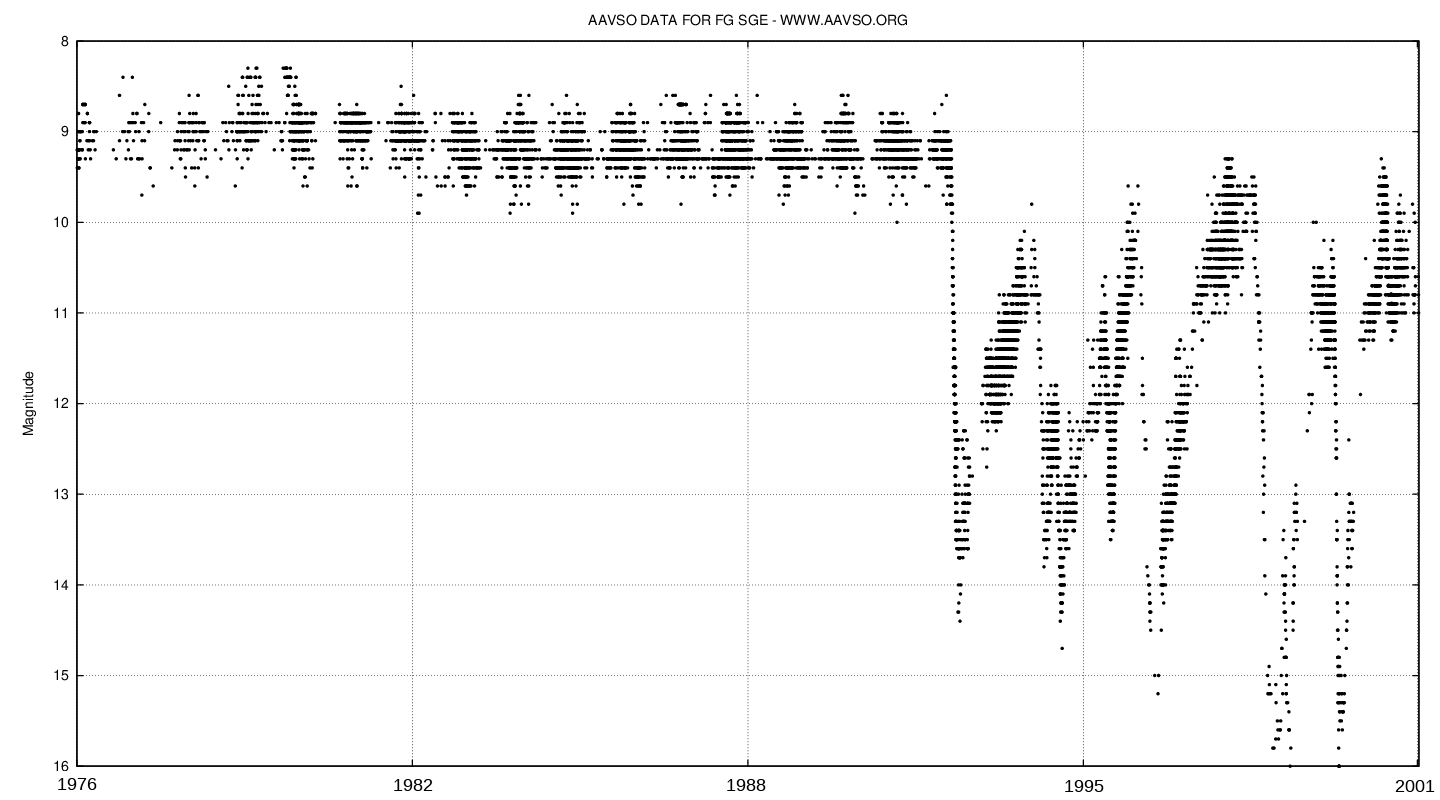
Light curve showing the onset of R Coronae Borealis-type deep minima in 1992

In 1943, a star designated AN 377.1943 was discovered to be a previously-unknown variable star. It was designated CSV 5066 as a suspected variable, and then FG Sagittae as a confirmed variable star. At the time, its variations were described as being irregular, but it was soon noted that the average brightness was steadily increasing. It brightened by about two magnitudes between 1943 and 1970, and then began to fade. Examination of old photographic observations found that the star had been brightening since at least 1900, with extrapolations suggesting that the minimum had occurred around 1880. As it faded, FG Sagittae began to show periodic variations, at first a period of 80 days, but increasing to 130 days. In 1992, the periodic variations ceased and the brightness decreased by five magnitudes in only two months. Since then, it has continued to show occasional deep fading events, appearing much like an R Coronae Borealis star.

The spectrum of FG Sagittae when it was first noted as a variable star was that of a blue supergiant. The first reliable spectral class is B0 in 1930. Extrapolation of the brightness and colour indices suggest it may have been an O3 star in 1890. It then steadily cooled, with the spectral class becoming as late as K2 in the 1980s. The spectral class has since stayed as a G or K type supergiant, but there have been dramatic changes. The abundances of various elements have either increased or decreased: s-process elements became at least 25 times more abundant between 1967 and 1974; iron peak elements became less visible; and carbon-rich dust became strongly visible after 1992. Observations of the spectrum after 1992 are hindered by the dust formation, but the s-process and rare earth elements appear to have continued becoming more abundant.

== Planetary nebula ==
There is a very faint visible planetary nebula, Henize 1-5, around FG Sagittae, around visual magnitude 23. This formed when FG Sagittae first left the asymptotic giant branch. FG Sagittae is now losing mass at about one M_{☉} every million years and a dust shell has formed around the star. This may form a second planetary nebula.

== Evolution ==
The effective temperature of FG Sagittae in 1930 would have been about 25,000 K, possibly as hot as 45,000 K in 1890, then cooling to about 5,500 K by 1975. Detailed analysis of the spectral energy distribution during the 1980s show a slow decrease in temperature to as low as 5,280 K. During the deep fades since 1992, even lower temperatures have been calculated, but these may represent observations of obscuring dust rather than the surface of the star itself.

The bolometric luminosity of FG Sagittae increased steadily from around 2,700 L_{☉} at the end of the 19th century to over 10,000 L_{☉} by 1965. The luminosity then became more or less stable until 1992. As the star cooled and became more luminous, its radius increased from around one R_{☉} in 1900 to about 184 R_{☉} by 1992.

When the star faded in 1992, it was obscured by dust formation and comparisons of temperature and luminosity became more difficult. The visual luminosity dropped by about five magnitudes, but the infrared brightness increased by a comparable amount. Models of the dust around the star suggest that the luminosity dropped sharply for a few hundred days as dust formed and was heated, but the underlying stellar luminosity was essentially constant and remained constant until at least 2001.

The underlying properties of FG Sagittae changed on a timescale almost unheard-of for a star, from a small very hot post-asymptotic giant branch star becoming a white dwarf, to a hot supergiant and then a cool supergiant. This is believed to have been due to a helium flash in a shell that had previously been inactive since the star left the asymptotic giant branch. This is known as a late thermal pulse or very late thermal pulse, depending on the exact timing. Models approximate the behaviour of FG Sagittae although there are still detailed discrepancies.

== See also ==
- Sakurai's Object, also known as V4334 Sgr, another presumed late thermal pulsing object.
- V605 Aquilae.
