= Shimada (surname) =

Shimada (written: 島田 or 嶋田 lit. "island rice field") is a Japanese surname. Notable people with the surname include:

- Akira Shimada (島田 叡; 1901–1945), Japanese politician
- Bell M. Shimada (1922–1958), American fisheries scientist
- Bin Shimada (島田 敏; born 1954), Japanese actor, voice actor and narrator
- Chiyako Shimada (島田 智哉子; born 1962), Japanese politician
- Fumikane Shimada (島田 フミカネ; born 1974), anime and video game illustrator and character designer
- Haruka Shimada (島田 晴香; born 1992), Japanese idol, singer and actress
- Ichirō Shimada (島田 一郎; 1848–1878), samurai
- Izumi Shimada (島田 泉; born 1948), anthropologist
- Kaho Shimada (島田 歌穂; born 1963), Japanese singer
- Kosaku Shimada (島田 幸作; 1944–2008), Japanese golfer
- Kyusaku Shimada (嶋田 久作; born 1955), Japanese actor
- Mao Shimada (島田 麻央; born 2008), Japanese figure skater
- Masahiko Shimada (島田 雅彦; born 1961), Japanese writer
- Michiru Shimada (島田 満; 1959–2017), anime screenwriter
- Niro Shimada (島田 仁郎; born 1938), Japanese judge
- Shimada Mitsufusa (島田 充房), 18th-century Japanese botanical illustrator
- Miwako Shimada (嶋田 美和子; born 1972), Japanese fencer
- Natsue Shimada (島田 夏枝; born 1950), Japanese handball player
- Setsuko Shimada (島田 節子; born 1938), Japanese swimmer
- Shigeru Shimada (島田 繁; born 1935), Japanese ice hockey player
- Shigetarō Shimada (嶋田 繁太郎; 1883–1976), Japanese admiral
- Shinsuke Shimada (島田 紳助; born 1956), Japanese comedian and television presenter
- Shogo Shimada (disambiguation), multiple people
- Shusuke Shimada (島田 周輔; born 1976), Japanese footballer
- Soji Shimada (島田 荘司; born 1948), Japanese mystery novelist
- Tadashi Shimada (嶋田 忠; born 1949), Japanese photographer
- Takahiro Shimada (島田 貴裕; born 1964), Japanese footballer
- Takashi Shimada (嶋田 隆司), manga writer see Yudetamago
- Teru Shimada (島田 輝; 1905–1988), actor
- Thomas Shimada, tennis player
- Shimada Toranosuke (1810–1864), Japanese samurai
- Toshio Shimada (島田 俊雄; 1877–1947), Japanese politician, cabinet minister
- Toshiyuki Shimada, conductor
- Yoko Shimada (島田 陽子; 1953–2022), Japanese actress
- Yuji Shimada (島田 裕二; born 1966), Japanese mixed martial arts and professional wrestling referee
- Yuki Shimada (島田 祐輝; born 1986), Japanese footballer
- Yusuke Shimada (島田 裕介; born 1982), Japanese footballer

== Fictional characters ==
- Shimada Kambei, one of the fictional Seven Samurai
- Haruo Shimada, from Dai Sentai Goggle-V
- Genji Shimada, a cybernetic ninja from the video game Overwatch
- Hanzo Shimada, the brother of Genji Shimada and skilled archer, from the video game Overwatch
- Norimichi Shimada, character from Fireworks, Should We See It from the Side or the Bottom?
- Alice Shimada, a character from Girls und Panzer
- Chiyo Shimada, mother of Alice Shimada from Girls und Panzer
