= Matsusaburo Fujiwara =

Japanese mathematician and historian of mathematics (1881–1946)

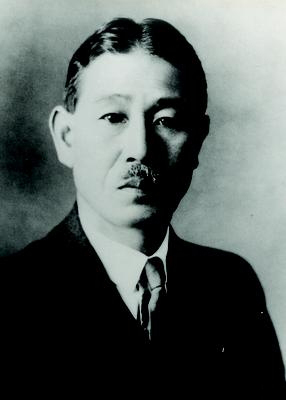
Matsusaburō Fujiwara

Matsusaburo Fujiwara (藤原 松三郎, Fujiwara Matsusaburō, 14 February 1881, Tsu, Mie – 12 October 1946, Fukushima) was a Japanese mathematician and historian of mathematics.

== Education and career ==
Fujiwara graduated in June 1902 from secondary school at the Third Higher School in Kyoto and then studied mathematics at the University of Tokyo, where he graduated in 1905. His most important teacher was Rikitaro Fujisawa (1861–1933). In 1906 he became a secondary school teacher at the First Higher School Daiichi Kōtō Gakkō in Tokyo. In 1908 Fujiwara and Tsuruichi Hayashi (1873–1935) were appointed professors at Tohoku University in Sendai. To prepare for his professorial duties, Fujiwara was sent to study from 1908 to 1911 in Göttingen, Paris and Berlin. After his return in February 1912, Fujiwara worked closely with his colleague Tsuruichi Hayashi, who in 1911 founded the Tohoku Mathematical Journal. The Journal published many of Fujiwara's mathematical papers. In November 1914 he received his doctorate.

Fujiwara was an important contributor to the development of the Mathematical Institute of the University of Tokyo. His contacts with European mathematicians made it possible to create an extensive library. He worked in the mathematical fields of analysis, geometry, and number theory and wrote more than 100 mathematical articles in German, English, and Japanese. After the death of his colleague Hayashi in 1935, Fujiwara intensively studied the history of wasan, i.e. traditional Japanese mathematics. In 1928–1929 his two-volume algebra textbook was published, and from 1934 to 1939 his two-volume analysis textbook was published. His manuscript (about eight thousand pages) on the history of mathematics in Japan survived the bombing of Sendai in July 1945 and was published posthumously in 5 volumes from 1954 to 1960 by the Japan Academy. From historians active in the first half of the twentieth century, Matsusaburo Fujiwara and Yoshio Mikami are considered the two leading historians of wasan.

In 1925 he and the mathematician Teiji Takagi were elected to the Japan Academy. While Takagi was considered the more original researcher (on the basis of contributions to class field theory), Fujiwara was known for his scholarship. In 1936 Fujiwara was an Invited Speaker of the International Congress of Mathematicians in Oslo.

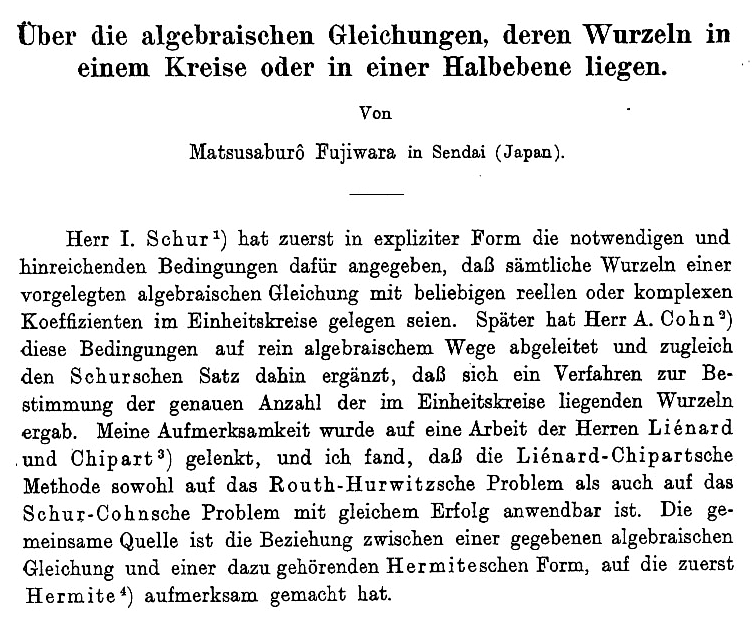
beginning of an article by Matsusaburō Fujiwara in the Mathematische Zeitschrift, 1926

== Selected publications ==
- Meiji-zen Nippon Sugakushi (history of mathematics in Japan before the Meiji era), 5 vols., 1954 to 1960
- Nippon Sugakushi-yo (brief history of Japanese mathematics), 1952
- Seiyo Sugakushi (history of western mathematics from antiquity to Euler), 1956
- (with Sōichi Kakeya): On some problems of maxima and minima for the curve of constant breadth and the in-revolvable curve of the equilateral triangle, Tōhoku Math. J. 11, 92–110, 1917
- Ein Problem aus der Theorie der diophantischen Approximationen, lecture at the International Congress of Mathematicians in 1936 in Oslo, online
