= Takata =

Takata may refer to:

- Takata Corporation, a former Japanese automotive parts company (went bankrupt in 2018)
- Japanet Takata, a Japanese company
- Takata District, Hiroshima, a district located in Hiroshima Prefecture, Japan
- Takata, Fukuoka, a town located in Miike District, Fukuoka Prefecture, Japan
- Rikuzen-Takata Station, a JR East railway station located in Rikuzen-Takata, Iwate Prefecture, Japan

== People with the surname ==
- Atsuko Takata (高田 貴子; born 1977), Japanese speed skater
- Hawayo Takata (1900–1980), Japanese-American who helped introduce the spiritual practice of Reiki to the Western World
- Mayuko Takata (born 1971), Japanese actress
- Princess Takata (674–728), Japanese princess during the Asuka period and Nara period of Japanese history
- Seiko Takata (1895–1977), Japanese dancer
- Taylor Takata (born 1982), American athlete
- Yasuma Takata (1883–1972), sociologist and economist
- Mashiho Takata (born 2001), Japanese member of South Korean boyband TREASURE

=== Fictional people ===
- Hideko Takata, a fictional geophysicist from Marvel Comics

== See also ==
- Takata Station (disambiguation)
- Tacata (disambiguation)
- Takada (disambiguation)
