= Takada Station =

Takada Station (高田駅) is the name of multiple train stations in Japan:

- Takada Station (Nara)
- Takada Station (Niigata)

== See also ==
- 高田駅 (disambiguation)
- Kōda Station (disambiguation)
- Takata Station (disambiguation)
