= A Serpentis =

The Bayer designation A Serpentis is shared by two stars in the head of the constellation Serpens:

- A^{1} Serpentis (11 Serpentis)
- A^{2} Serpentis (25 Serpentis)
