= V605 Aquilae =

Star in the constellation Aquila

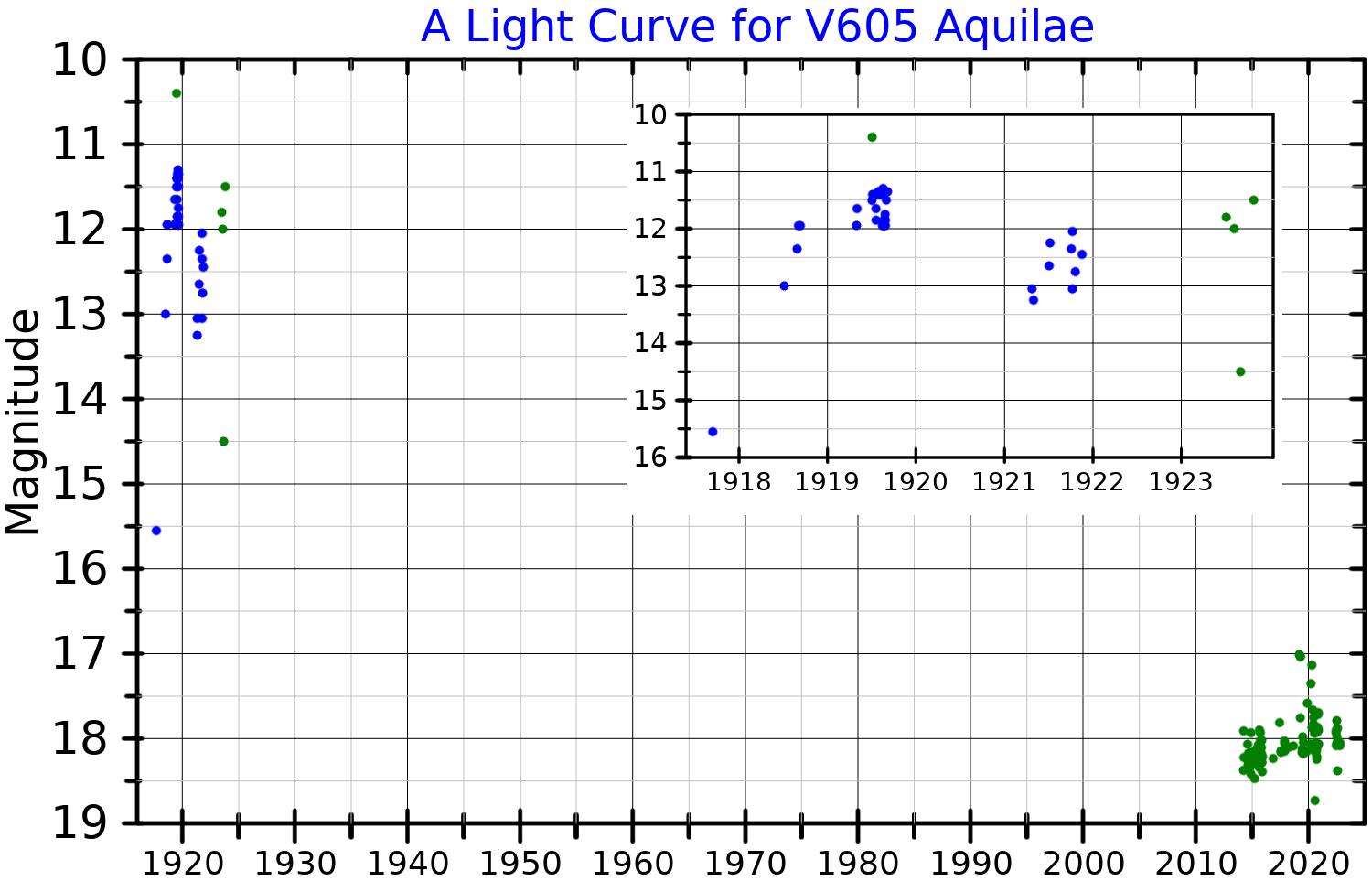
- A light curve for V605 Aquilae, plotted with data from the AAVSO, Duerbeck et al. and Wolf. The green points show the visual band data and the blue points show the photographic (blue band) data. The inset plot shows the period of peak brightness with an expanded scale.

Observation data Epoch J2000.0 Equinox ICRS
- Constellation: Aquila
- Right ascension: 19^{h} 18^{m} 20.476^{s}
- Declination: +01° 47′ 59.62″
- Apparent magnitude (V): 10.4 – >23

Characteristics
- Spectral type: [WC4]

Astrometry
Radial velocity (R_{v})	+80 km/s
Distance	4,600 pc

Details
Mass	~1 M_{☉}
Luminosity	10,000 L_{☉}
Temperature	5,000 – 95,000 K

Other designations
- V605 Aql, IRAS 19158+0141, Nova Aquilae 1919, AAVSO 1913+01

Database references
SIMBAD	data

V605 Aquilae, in the constellation Aquila, is the variable central star of the planetary nebula Abell 58. It is a highly unusual hydrogen-deficient carbon-rich star.

The discovery of V605 Aquilae was announced by Max Wolf in 1920. It had been found on two photographic plates taken on July 4, 1919. Initially believed to be a nova, it turned out to be a very unusual variable. It was measured to be magnitude 10.4 at its peak. Investigation of prior photographs showed that it was magnitude 15 or fainter until 1918, when it brightened to 12th magnitude. It stayed at 11th magnitude or brighter for over a year, before fading from sight. It then brightened to 12th magnitude in late 1921 and again in 1923, before disappearing. The spectral type at the time of the outbursts was R0, a cool hydrogen-deficient carbon star similar to some R Coronae Borealis (RCB) stars.

V605 Aquilae was subsequently detected several times at magnitudes 18–20, but these are likely to have been detections only of a small knot of nebulosity surrounding the position of the star. Hubble images show that the star itself was fainter than magnitude 23, although the nebulosity was a bright irregular infrared object 2.5" across. It was suspected that the star was still luminous but largely hidden by the dense nebulosity. Although the star could not be detected directly, scattered light showed a [WC4] spectral type, quite different from the spectrum at peak brightness. In 2013, the central star was detected at magnitude 20.2, with an estimated four magnitudes of extinction. The spectral type is now [WC4], a hydrogen-deficient, helium and carbon-rich object with strong emission lines.

In 1921, the surface has been estimated to consist of 98% helium and 1% carbon, typical of an RCB star. By 2006, the abundances were measured as 55% helium, 45% carbon, and 5% oxygen, typical of a WC star. Both are very unusual, compared to the majority of stars that are mostly hydrogen.

Starting around 1970, the temperature began to increase and is now over 90,000 K. It is widely believed to be a born-again star, a post-asymptotic-giant-branch star which experienced a very late thermal pulse and began to fuse again. An alternative explanation is that the outburst was a nova from an oxygen-neon white dwarf. To explain difficulties with the nova theory, a merger has been proposed between a white dwarf and a normal companion star.

V605 Aquilae is at the centre of a planetary nebula and is believed to be the source of the nebula. The visible planetary nebula is approximately spherical and far older than the 1919 outburst. A much smaller nebula originating from the outburst is non-spherical. The shape may be a disc plus a bipolar nebula or torus containing a dusty band. The band or disc almost entirely obscures the central star. Comparison of the angular size changes of the nebula and its radial velocities suggest a distance of 4,600 parsecs.

== See also ==
- FG Sagittae
- Sakurai's Object
