= Maeda =

Maeda (前田 lit. "front rice field") is a Japanese surname. An archaic romanization (sometimes used by the Japanese diaspora in their home countries) includes Mayeda. It can refer to:

== People ==
=== Maeda clan ===
- Maeda Toshimasa, daimyō, vassal of Oda Nobuhide
- Maeda Toshiie, son of Maeda Toshimasa, famous as million-koku daimyō
- Maeda Toshinaga, eldest son of Maeda Toshiie
- Maeda Toshitsune, brother and heir to Maeda Toshinaga
- Maeda Keiji, nephew of Maeda Toshiie by Toshihisa Maeda
- Marquis Toshinari Maeda, World War II general

=== Others ===
- Ai Maeda (voice actress) (前田 愛; born 1975), voice actress
- Ai Maeda (actress) (前田 愛; born 1983), actress
- Aki Maeda (前田 亜季; born 1985), actress and singer
- Akira Maeda (born 1959), professional wrestler
- Atsuko Maeda (前田 敦子; born 1991), actress and singer
- Daisuke Maeda (前田 大介), Japanese Paralympic swimmer
- Daizen Maeda (前田 大然; born 1997), Japanese footballer
- Maeda Genzō (前田 玄造; 1831–1906), early photographer
- Gōki Maeda (前田 公輝; born 1991), actor
- Gordon Maeda (born 2000), Japanese–American actor
- Hiroshi Maeda (前田 浩; born 1961), stuntman and suit actor
- Hiroshi Maeda (chemist) (前田浩; 1938–2021), chemist known for EPR effect
- Hirotake Maeda, historian
- Honami Maeda (前田 穂南; born 1996), Japanese long-distance runner
- John Maeda, graphic designer and computer scientist
- Jun Maeda (前田 浩; born 1975), writer, lyricist, composer
- Kaori Maeda (前田 佳織里; born 1996), Japanese voice actress and singer
- Kaoru Maeda (前田 薫; born 1969), professional wrestler
- Kazuhiro Maeda (前田 和浩; born 1981), long-distance runner
- Kenjiro Maeda (前田 健滋朗; born 1990), Japanese basketball coach
- Kenta Maeda (前田 健太; born 1988), baseball pitcher
- Kentaro Maeda (前田 拳太郎; born 1999), actor, portrays Ikki Igarashi in Kamen Rider Revice
- Mahiro Maeda (前田 真宏; born 1963), artist, writer and director of anime
- Michiko Maeda (前田 通子; born 1934), film and television actress
- Mitsuyo Maeda (前田 光世; 1878–1941), judoka, fundamental to the creation of Brazilian Jiu-Jitsu
- Miyu Maeda (前田 美優; born 1996), Japanese table tennis player
- Miyuki Maeda (前田 美順; born 1985), Japanese badminton player
- Mutsuhiko Maeda (前田 睦彦; born 1947), Japanese speed skater
- Naoki Maeda (disambiguation), multiple people
- Nobuaki Maeda (前田 陳爾; 1907–1975), Japanese go player
- Nobuteru Maeda (前田 亘輝; born 1965), singer-songwriter
- Nobuyo Maeda (前田 信代), geneticist and medical researcher
- Norio Maeda (前田 憲男; 1934–2018), Japanese jazz composer and pianist
- Rin Maeda (前田凛; born 2005), Japanese judoka
- Ryoichi Maeda (前田 遼一; born 1981), Japanese footballer
- Seison Maeda (前田 青邨; 1885–1977), Nihonga painter
- Shinsaku Maeda (前田 新; born 1952), Japanese golfer
- Shinzo Maeda (前田 真三; 1922–1998), photographer
- Steven Maeda, television writer
- Tadashi Maeda (disambiguation), multiple people
- Tatsuyuki Maeda (前田 龍之; born 1968), video game composer
- Terunobu Maeda (前田 晃伸; born 1945), Japanese banker and chief executive
- Thomas Aquino Manyo Maeda (前田 万葉; born 1949), Cardinal of the Catholic Church
- Toshio Maeda (前田 俊夫; born 1953), Japanese manga artist
- Yonezō Maeda (前田 米蔵; 1888–1954), politician, cabinet minister
- Yuki Maeda (前田 有紀; born 1979), Japanese enka singer
- Yuuka Maeda (前田 憂佳; born 1994), member of Jpop group S/mileage

== Fictional characters ==
- Maeda (Asobi Asobase), from the manga series Asobi Asobase
- Akira Maeda, a character in the manga Cromartie High School
- Ema Maeda, from Love Hina
- Hayato Maeda (Chumley Huffington), from Yu-Gi-Oh! GX
- Kunihiko Maeda, from the Parasite Eve video game
- Kazuya Maeda, from Photo Kano

== Companies ==
- Maeda Corporation, a holding company
- Maeda Industries (formerly Maeda Iron Works Company), a manufacturer of SunTour bicycle drive-train components
