= Ueda =

Ueda may refer to:

== Places ==
- Ueda, Nagano, a city in Japan
- Ueda Castle in Japan
- Ueda Domain of Japan
- Ueda Glacier in Antarctica

== Other uses ==
- Ueda (surname)
- Siege of Ueda, in 1600
- Ueda Electric Railway Bessho Line

== See also ==
- Ueta
