= 神田駅 =

神田駅 is the name of multiple train stations in Japan:

- Kanda Station (disambiguation)
  - Kanda Station (Tokyo)
- Kōda Station (disambiguation)
  - Kōda Station (Saza)
