= 高田駅 =

高田駅 is the name of multiple train stations in Japan:

- Kōda Station (disambiguation)
  - Kōda Station (Nagayo)
- Takada Station (disambiguation)
  - Takada Station (Nara)
  - Takada Station (Niigata)
- Takata Station (disambiguation)
  - Takata Station (Fukuoka)
  - Takata Station (Kagawa)
  - Takata Station (Kanagawa)
