= Fujihara =

Fujihara (written: 藤原) is a Japanese surname and a place name, which may refer to:

- Fujihara, Tochigi (Fujihara-machi), a town
- Arashi Fujihara (藤原 あらし; born 1978), Japanese kickboxer and Muay Thai fighter
- Daisuke Fujihara (藤原 大輔; born 1994), Japanese para badminton player
- Kento Fujihara (藤原 賢土; born 1992), Japanese football coach and former player
- Masanori Fujihara (藤原 正典; born 1988), Japanese professional baseball pitcher
- Yuta Fujihara (藤原 悠汰; born 1999), Japanese footballer

== See also ==
- Fujiwara (disambiguation) (藤原), a heteronym
