= Kinoshita =

Kinoshita (written: 木下 or 木之下) is a Japanese surname. Notable people with the surname include:

- Airi Kinoshita (木下 あいり; 1998–2005), Japanese murder victim
- Akira Kinoshita (木之下 晃; 1936–2015), Japanese photographer
- Alicia Kinoshita (born 1967), Japanese sailor
- Ayumi Kinoshita (木下 あゆ美; born 1982), Japanese actress
- Cherry Kinoshita (1923–2008), Japanese American activist
- Hiroyuki Kinoshita (木下 浩之; born 1958), Japanese voice actor and actor
- Houka Kinoshita (木下 ほうか; born 1964), Japanese actor
- Iesada Kinoshita (木下 家定; 1543–1608), Japanese samurai
- Jun'an Kinoshita (木下 順庵; 1621–1699), Japanese Neo-Confucian philosopher
- Junji Kinoshita (木下 順二; 1914–2006), Japanese playwright
- Keisuke Kinoshita (木下 惠介; 1912–1998), Japanese film director
- Kōichi Kinoshita (木下 浩一; born 1967), Japanese shogi player
- Kosuke Kinoshita (木下 康介; born 1994), Japanese footballer
- Kozue Kinoshita (木下 梢; 1912–?), Japanese ice hockey player
- Kyosuke Kinoshita (木下 恭輔; born 1941) chairman of Acom, son of Masao
- Makiko Kinoshita (木下 牧子; born 1956), Japanese composer
- Masao Kinoshita (木下 政雄; 1910–1985), founder of Acom, a major consumer loan company in Japan
- Masao Kinoshita (architect) (1925–2003) was an American landscape architect
- Mokutaro Kinoshita (木下 杢太郎; 1885–1945), pen-name of a Japanese author, Dramaturge, poet, art historian and literary critic
- Nahoko Kinoshita (木下 菜穂子; born 1980), Japanese actress and voice actress
- Naoe Kinoshita (木下 尚江; 1869–1937), Japanese Christian socialist activist and author
- Naoyuki Kinoshita (木下 直之; born 1954), Japanese art historian
- Noriaki Kinoshita (born 1982), Japanese American football player
- Kinoshita Rigen (木下 利玄; 1886–1925), pen-name of Japanese author Viscount Kinoshita Toshiharu, noted for his tanka poetry
- Kinoshita Tokichiro (木下 藤吉郎), one of the names of Japanese daimyō Toyotomi Hideyoshi (1537–1598)
- Robert Kinoshita (1914–2014), American artist, art director and set and production designer
- Ryosuke Kinoshita (born 1991), Japanese professional golfer
- Sakura Kinoshita (木下 さくら), Japanese manga artist
- Sayaka Kinoshita (木下 紗華; born 1981), Japanese voice actress
- Takanori Kinoshita (木下 孝則; 1894–1973), Japanese artist
- Toichiro Kinoshita (木下 東一郎; 1925–2023), Japanese theoretical physicist
- Yuka Kinoshita (木下 ゆうか; born 1985), Japanese professional eater
- Yūji Kinoshita (木下 夕爾; 1914–1965), Japanese poet

== See also ==
- 7250 Kinoshita, asteroid
- Kinoshita Station
