= Watabe =

Watabe (渡部) is a Japanese surname. The characters for the name Watabe can also be read as Watanabe, another surname. Notable people with the surname include:

- Akito Watabe (渡部 暁斗, born 1988), Japanese skier
- Daisuke Watabe (渡部 大輔, born 1989), Japanese football player
- Ken Watabe (渡部 建, born 1972), Japanese comedian and television presenter
- Hachiro Kasuga (春日 八郎, 1924–1991), born Minoru Watabe, Japanese enka singer
- Sayumi Watabe (渡部 紗弓), Japanese voice actress
- Shino Watabe (渡部 思乃, born 1970), Japanese artist living in Mexico
- Takeshi Watabe (渡部 猛, 1936–2010), Japanese voice actor
- Yurie Watabe (渡部 由梨恵, born 1989), Japanese freestyle skier
