= Fujiwara =

Fujiwara (Japanese pronunciation: [ɸɯʑiwaɾa], written: 藤原 lit. "Wisteria field") is a Japanese surname. (In English conversation it is likely to be rendered as /fuːdʒiːˈwɑːrə/.) Notable people with the surname include:

== Families ==
- The Fujiwara clan and its members
  - Fujiwara no Kamatari
  - Fujiwara no Fuhito
  - Fujiwara no Michinaga
- Northern Fujiwara clan
  - Fujiwara no Kiyohira

== Arts and entertainment ==
- Atsushi Fujiwara (藤原 敦; born 1963), Japanese photographer
- Harry Fujiwara (Mr. Fuji) (1934 - 2016), Japanese-American wrestler
- Hiroshi Fujiwara (藤原 ヒロシ; born 1964), Japanese musician, trendsetter, producer, and designer
- Kamatari Fujiwara (藤原 釜足; 1905–1985), Japanese actor
- Kei Fujiwara (不二稿 京; born 1957), Japanese actress and film director
- Keiji Fujiwara (藤原 啓治; 1964–2020), Japanese voice actor
- Motoo Fujiwara (藤原 基央; born 1979), lead singer and composer for the Japanese rock band Bump of Chicken
- Norika Fujiwara (藤原 紀香; born 1971), Japanese beauty queen, model and actress
- Tatsuya Fujiwara (藤原 竜也; born 1982), Japanese actor
- Tokuro Fujiwara (藤原 得郎; born 1961), Japanese video game designer
- Yoshiaki Fujiwara (藤原 喜明; born 1949), Japanese actor and professional wrestler
- Yoshie Fujiwara (藤原 義江; 1898–1976), Japanese tenor singer

== Science ==
- Masahiko Fujiwara (藤原 正彦; born 1943), Japanese mathematician and essayist
- Matsusaburo Fujiwara (藤原 松三郎; 1881–1946), Japanese mathematician and historian of mathematics
- Sakuhei Fujiwhara (藤原 咲平; 1884–1950), Japanese meteorologist
- Toshi Fujiwara (藤原利隆（とし); 1939–2016), Japanese scientist in the field of combustion and detonation

== Politicians ==
- Michiko Fujiwara (藤原 道子; 1900–1983), Japanese nurse and politician
- René Fujiwara (born 1984), Mexican politician

== Sports ==
- Naoya Fujiwara (藤原 直哉; born 1965), Japanese shogi player
- Rika Fujiwara (藤原 里華; born 1981), Japanese tennis player
- Shiho Fujiwara (藤原 志保; born 1971), Japanese ice hockey player
- Sotaro Fujiwara (藤原 崇太郎; born 1998), Japanese judoka
- Toshio Fujiwara (藤原 敏男; born 1948), Japanese kickboxer
- Yuta Fujiwara (藤原 優汰; born 2006), Japanese racing driver

== Fictional characters ==
- Fujiwara, character of Haruhi Suzumiya
- Chika Fujiwara, character of Kaguya-sama: Love Is War
  - Daichi Fujiwara, her father
- Chiyoko Fujiwara, main character of Millennium Actress
- Hazuki Fujiwara, a.k.a. Reanne Griffith, character in Ojamajo Doremi (Magical DoReMi)
  - Akira Fujiwara, a.k.a. George Griffith, her father
  - Reiko Fujiwara, her mother
- Fujiwara no Mokou, a character of Touhou Project
- Fujiwara-no-Sai, character of Hikaru no Go
- Fujiwara no Takamichi, character of Harukanaru Toki no Naka de
- Takumi Fujiwara, character of Initial D
- Toki Fujiwara, a character of Code: Breaker
- Fujiwara no Yukitaka, character of Harukanaru Toki no Naka de 2
- Zakuro Fujiwara, a.k.a. Renee Roberts, character of Tokyo Mew Mew (Mew Mew Power)

== See also ==
- Fujiwara, Mie, a former town in Mie Prefecture
- Fujiwara-kyō, an ancient Imperial capital of Japan, corresponding to modern-day Kashihara, Nara
- The Fujiwhara effect (in weather)
- Fujiwara (comedy duo), Japanese comedy duo (kombi) consisting of Toshifumi Fujimoto (藤本 敏史) and Takayuki Haranishi (原西 孝幸)
