= Shimada =

Shimada may refer to:

- Shimada (surname), a Japanese surname
- Shimada (city), Shizuoka, Japan
  - Shimada-juku
  - Shimada Station
- Shimada (hairstyle), a traditional Japanese hairstyle for women
- 13678 Shimada, asteroid
- NOAAS Bell M. Shimada (R 227), a U.S. National Oceanic and Atmospheric Administration research ship commissioned in 2010
