= 11 Serpentis =

Star in the constellation Serpens

Observation data Epoch J2000 Equinox ICRS
- Constellation: Serpens
- Right ascension: 15^{h} 32^{m} 57.93765^{s}
- Declination: −01° 11′ 11.0412″
- Apparent magnitude (V): 5.497

Characteristics
- Evolutionary stage: horizontal branch
- Spectral type: K0 III
- B−V color index: 1.092

Astrometry
Radial velocity (R_{v})	−16.1±2.8 km/s
Proper motion (μ)	RA: −17.765 mas/yr Dec.: −42.217 mas/yr
Parallax (π)	12.0563±0.1290 mas
Distance	271 ± 3 ly (82.9 ± 0.9 pc)
Absolute magnitude (M_{V})	0.83

Details
Mass	1.27±0.35 M_{☉}
Radius	11 R_{☉}
Luminosity	50 L_{☉}
Surface gravity (log g)	2.48±0.11 cgs
Temperature	4,767±92 K
Metallicity [Fe/H]	−0.13 dex
Age	2.75+0.88 −0.66 Gyr

Other designations
- A^{1} Ser, 11 Ser, BD−00°2982, FK5 3226, GC 20896, HD 138562, HIP 76133, HR 5772, SAO 140596

Database references
SIMBAD	data

11 Serpentis is a single star in the constellation of Serpens, located 271 light years away from the Sun. It has the Bayer designation A^{1} Serpentis, 11 Serpentis is the Flamsteed designation. This object is visible to the naked eye as a faint, orange-hued star with an apparent visual magnitude of 5.497. It is moving closer to the Earth with a heliocentric radial velocity of −16 km/s.

This is an aging giant star with a stellar classification of K0 III, a star that has used up its core hydrogen and has expanded. It is a red clump giant on the horizontal branch, which indicates it is generating energy through the fusion of helium at its core. 11 Serpentis is 2.75 billion years old with 1.3 times the mass of the Sun and has 11 times the Sun's radius. It is radiating 50 times the Sun's luminosity from its enlarged photosphere at an effective temperature of 4,767 K.
