= Tacata =

Tacata may refer to:

- Tácata, a town in the state of Miranda, Venezuela
- "Tacata'", also known as "Tacatà" and "Tacatá", a 2012 international hit single by Tacabro

== See also ==
- Takata (disambiguation)
