= Sakurai (surname) =

Sakurai (written: 桜井 or 櫻井 literally "well of the cherry blossom") is a Japanese surname. Notable people with the surname include:

- Atsushi Sakurai (櫻井 敦司; 1966–2023), Japanese singer
- Hayato Sakurai (born 1975), mixed martial arts fighter
- Hideo Sakurai (桜井 秀男; born 1948), Japanese ice hockey player
- Jun John Sakurai (1933–1982), physicist
- Junko Sakurai (桜井 純子; born 1967), Japanese swimmer
- Kazutoshi Sakurai (born 1970), musician
- Kodai Sakurai (桜井 広大; born 1983), Japanese baseball player
- Koji Sakurai (桜井 孝次; born 1936), Japanese triple jumper
- Kunihiko Sakurai (桜井 邦彦; born 1972), Japanese ice hockey player
- Masahiro Sakurai (桜井 政博, born 1970), game designer
- Masaru Sakurai (born 1955), singer for The Alfee
- Makoto Sakurai (born 1972), right-wing activist
- Reika Sakurai (桜井 玲香; born 1994), Japanese idol, singer and actress
- Sho Sakurai (櫻井 翔; born 1982), singer, songwriter and actor, member of Arashi
- Shogo Sakurai (桜井 鐘吾; born 1984), football player
- Shōzō Sakurai (桜井省三; 1889–1985), general of the Imperial Japanese Army
- Takahiro Sakurai (born 1974), voice actor
- Takao Sakurai (born 1941), Japanese boxer
- Tokutaro Sakurai (1897–1980), general of the Imperial Japanese Army
- Tomo Sakurai (1971–2025), Japanese actress and singer
- Toshiharu Sakurai (born 1964), Japanese voice actor
- Yoshiko Sakurai (born 1945), journalist
- Tetsuo Sakurai (born 1957), bassist of Casiopea

== Fictional characters ==
- Kanade Sakurai, one of the main characters in the anime/manga Candy Boy
- Shizuku Sakurai, one of the supporting characters in the anime/manga Candy Boy
- Yukino Sakurai, another one of the main characters in the anime/manga Candy Boy
- Yuuto Sakurai, one of the supporting characters in the television series Kamen Rider Den-O
- Rihoko Sakurai, one of the 6 lead females of the anime and manga Amagami SS
- Tomoki Sakurai, main character of Heaven's Lost Property
- Kouichi Sakurai, one of the main 'prince' of otome game Tokimeki Memorial Girl's Side: 3rd Story
- Goro Sakurai, one of the main characters in the J.A.K.Q. Dengekitai
- Ryō Sakurai, a character from the anime/manga Kuroko no Basket
- Izumi Sakurai, a character from the anime/manga Nichijou
- Makoto Sakurai, a character from the anime/manga Nichijou
- Shinichi Sakurai, one of the main characters in the anime and manga Uzaki-chan Wants to Hang Out!
- Ryoko Sakurai, a character in the manga and anime series Great Teacher Onizuka
- Keiwa Sakurai, one of the main characters in the television series Kamen Rider Geats
- Haruka Sakurai, one of the characters in the interactive music video series MILGRAM
- Nozomi Sakurai, one of the three main characters in the anime Kamisama Minarai: Himitsu no Cocotama

== See also ==
- Sakurai's Object, a star named after Japanese amateur astronomer Yukio Sakurai
