= Kawano =

Kawano (written: 河野, 川野 or かわの in hiragana) is a Japanese surname. Notable people with the surname include:

- Hiroki Kawano (河野 広貴; born 1990), Japanese footballer
- Junji Kawano (川野 淳次; born 1945), Japanese footballer
- Junko Kawano (河野 純子), Japanese game designer, game director and writer
- Kaoru Kawano, (born 1916), Japanese artist, known for wood blocks
- Katsumi Kawano (河野 かつみ; born 1965), Japanese volleyball player
- Kazumasa Kawano (河野 和正; born 1970), Japanese footballer
- Katsutoshi Kawano (河野 克俊; born 1954), Japanese admiral
- Keizoh Kawano (河野 啓三), keyboardist for Japanese jazz fusion band T-Square
- Kenichi Kawano (河野 健一), Japanese footballer
- Koichiro Kawano (born 1981), Japanese golfer
- Naoki Kawano (川野 直輝; born 1982), Japanese actor and musician
- Otoya Kawano (かわの をとや), Japanese voice actor
- Shinichi Kawano (河野 真一; born 1969), Japanese footballer
- Takashi Kawano (河野 貴志; born 1996), Japanese footballer
- Yosh Kawano (1921–2018), Chicago Cubs clubhouse manager

== See also ==
- Kawano Station, a railway station in Suzuka, Mie Prefecture, Japan
