= Carbon detonation =

Runaway fusion in a white dwarf star

Carbon detonation or carbon deflagration is the violent reignition of thermonuclear fusion in a white dwarf star that was previously slowly cooling. It involves a runaway thermonuclear process that spreads through the white dwarf in a matter of seconds, producing a Type Ia supernova, which releases an immense amount of energy as the star is blown apart. The carbon detonation/deflagration process leads to a supernova by a different route than the better known Type II (core-collapse) supernova (the Type II is caused by the cataclysmic explosion of the outer layers of a massive star as its core implodes).

== White dwarf density and mass increase ==
A white dwarf is the remnant of a small to medium size star like the Sun. At the end of its life, the star has exhausted its hydrogen and helium fuel, and thermonuclear fusion processes cease. The star does not have enough mass to either fuse heavier elements, or to implode into a neutron star or Type II supernova. It gradually shrinks and becomes very dense, glowing white and then red as it slowly cools over a period many times longer than the present age of the Universe.

Occasionally, a white dwarf gains mass from another source – for example, a binary star companion that is close enough for the dwarf star to siphon matter onto itself; or from a collision with other stars. If the white dwarf gains enough matter, its internal pressure and temperature will rise enough for carbon to begin fusing in its core. Carbon detonation generally occurs at the point when the accreted matter pushes the white dwarf's mass close to the Chandrasekhar limit of roughly 1.4 solar masses, the mass at which gravity can overcome the electron degeneracy pressure that prevents it from collapsing. This also happens when two white dwarfs merge if the combined mass is over the Chandrasekhar limit, resulting in a Type Ia supernova.

A main sequence star supported by thermal pressure would expand and cool with more heat, which automatically counterbalances an increase in thermal energy. Once electrons have become degenerate, however, pressure becomes independent of temperature; the white dwarf is unable to expand to regulate the fusion process in the manner of normal stars, so it is vulnerable to a runaway fusion reaction.

== Fusion and pressure ==
In a white dwarf, the restarted fusion reactions release heat, but the outward pressure that exists in the star and supports it against further collapse is initially due almost entirely to degeneracy pressure, not fusion processes or heat. Therefore, even when fusion recommences, the outward pressure that is key to the star's thermal balance does not increase much. One result is that the star does not expand much to balance its fusion and heat processes with gravity and electron pressure, as it did when burning hydrogen. This increase of heat production without a means of cooling by expansion raises the internal temperature dramatically, and therefore the rate of fusion also increases extremely quickly, a form of positive feedback known as thermal runaway.

A 2004 analysis of such a process states that:

A deflagration flame burning from the center of the white dwarf star outward leaves hot and light burnt material behind. The fuel in front of it is, however, cold and dense. This results in a density stratification inverse to the gravitational field of the star, which is therefore unstable. Thus, blobs of burning material form and ascend into the fuel. At their interfaces shear flows emerge. These effects lead to strong swirls. The resulting turbulent motions deform the flame and thus enlarge its surface. This increases the net burning rate of the flame and leads to the energetic explosion.

== Supercritical event ==
The flame accelerates dramatically, in part due to the Rayleigh–Taylor instability and interactions with turbulence. The resumption of fusion spreads outward in a series of uneven, expanding "bubbles" in accordance with Rayleigh–Taylor instability. Within the fusion area, the increase in heat with unchanged volume results in an exponentially rapid increase in the rate of fusion – a sort of supercritical event as thermal pressure increases boundlessly. As hydrostatic equilibrium is not possible in this situation, a "thermonuclear flame" is triggered and an explosive eruption through the dwarf star's surface that completely disrupts it, seen as a Type Ia supernova.

Regardless of the exact details of this nuclear fusion, it is generally accepted that a substantial fraction of the carbon and oxygen in the white dwarf is converted into heavier elements within a period of only a few seconds, raising the internal temperature to billions of degrees. This energy release from thermonuclear fusion (1–2×10^{44} J) is more than enough to unbind the star; that is, the individual particles making up the white dwarf gain enough kinetic energy to fly apart from each other. The star explodes violently and releases a shock wave in which matter is typically ejected at speeds on the order of 5,000–20000 km/s, roughly 6% of the speed of light. The energy released in the explosion also causes an extreme increase in luminosity. The typical visual absolute magnitude of Type Ia supernovae is M_{v} = −19.3 (about 5 billion times brighter than the Sun), with little variation. This process, of a volume supported by electron degeneracy pressure instead of thermal pressure gradually reaching conditions capable of igniting runaway fusion, is also found in a less dramatic form in a helium flash in the core of a sufficiently massive red giant star.
