= Asymptotic giant branch =

Grouping of evolved cool luminous stars

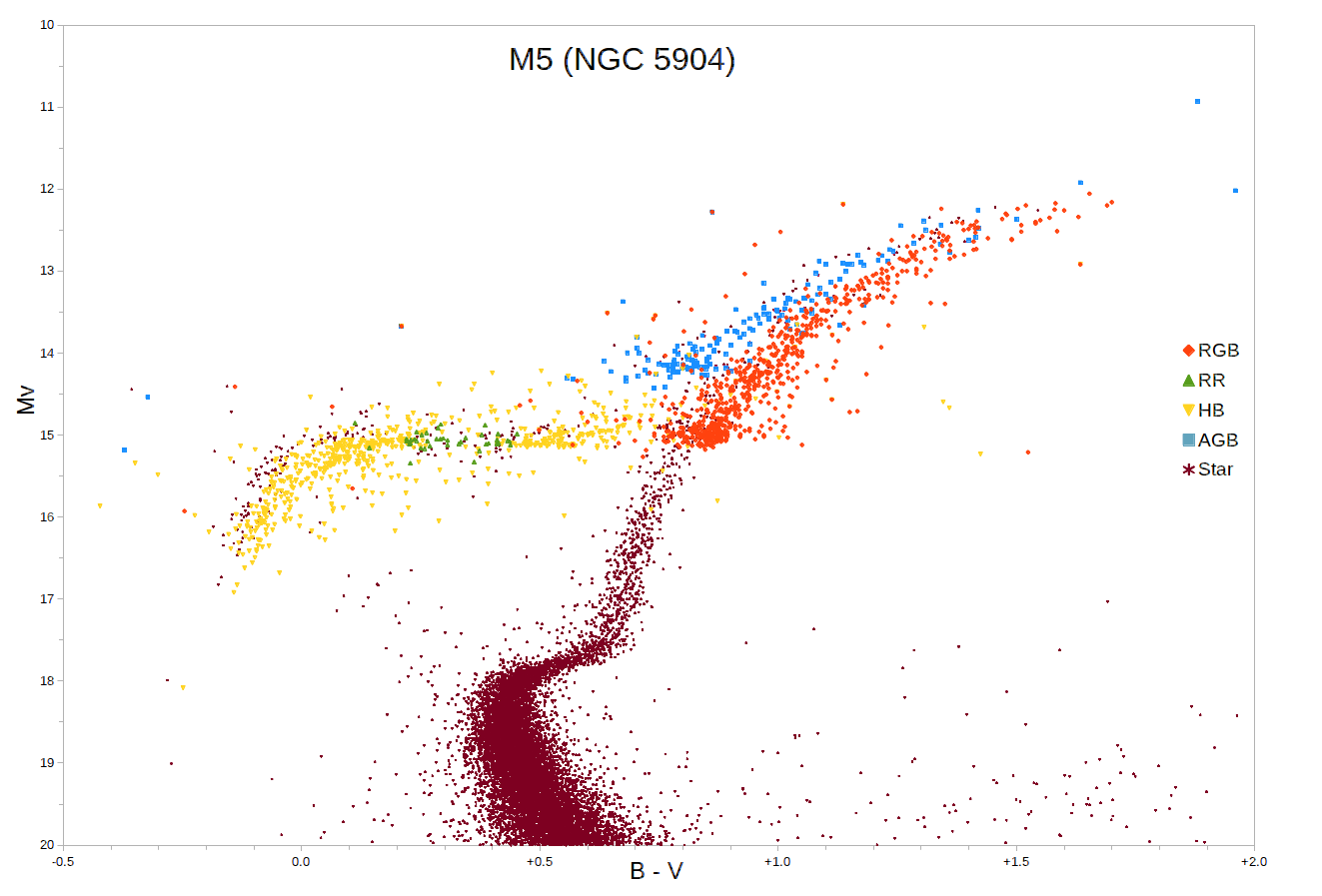
H–R diagram for globular cluster M5, with known AGB stars marked in blue, flanked by some of the more luminous red-giant branch stars, shown in orange Asymptotic giant branch (AGB) Upper red-giant branch (RGB) Horizontal branch (HB) RR Lyrae variable (RR) End of main sequence, subgiant branch, and lower RGB

The asymptotic giant branch (AGB) is a region of the Hertzsprung–Russell diagram populated by evolved cool luminous stars. This is a period of stellar evolution undertaken by all low- to intermediate-mass stars (about 0.5 to 8 solar masses) late in their lives.

Observationally, an asymptotic-giant-branch star will appear as a bright red giant with a luminosity ranging up to thousands of times greater than the Sun. Its interior structure is characterized by a central and largely inert core of carbon and oxygen, a shell where helium is undergoing fusion to form carbon (known as helium burning), another shell where hydrogen is undergoing fusion forming helium (known as hydrogen burning), and a very large envelope of material of composition similar to main-sequence stars (except in the case of carbon stars).

== Stellar evolution ==
A sun-like star moves onto the AGB from the Horizontal Branch after core helium exhaustion

A 5 M_{☉} star moves onto the AGB after a blue loop when helium is exhausted in its core

When a star exhausts the supply of hydrogen by nuclear fusion processes in its core, the core contracts and its temperature increases, causing the outer layers of the star to expand and cool. The star becomes a red giant, following a track towards the upper-right hand corner of the HR diagram. Eventually, once the temperature in the core has reached approximately 3×10^{8} K, helium burning (fusion of helium nuclei) begins. The onset of helium burning in the core halts the star's cooling and increase in luminosity, and the star instead moves down and leftwards in the HR diagram. This is the horizontal branch (for population II stars) or a blue loop for stars more massive than about 2.3 M_{☉}.

After the completion of helium burning in the core, the star again moves to the right and upwards on the diagram, cooling and expanding as its luminosity increases. Its path is almost aligned with its previous red-giant track, hence the name asymptotic giant branch, although the star will become more luminous on the AGB than it did at the tip of the red-giant branch. Stars at this stage of stellar evolution are known as AGB stars.

=== AGB stage ===
The AGB phase is divided into two parts, the early AGB (E-AGB) and the thermally pulsing AGB (TP-AGB). During the E-AGB phase, the main source of energy is helium fusion in a shell around a core consisting mostly of carbon and oxygen. During this phase, the star swells up to giant proportions to become a red giant again. The star's radius may become as large as one astronomical unit (~215 R_{☉}).

After the helium shell runs out of fuel, the TP-AGB starts. Now the star derives its energy from fusion of hydrogen in a thin shell, which restricts the inner helium shell to a very thin layer and prevents it fusing stably. However, over periods of 10,000 to 100,000 years, helium from the hydrogen shell burning builds up and eventually the helium shell ignites explosively, a process known as a helium shell flash. The power of the shell flash peaks at thousands of times the observed luminosity of the star, but decreases exponentially over just a few years. The shell flash causes the star to expand and cool which shuts off the hydrogen shell burning and causes strong convection in the zone between the two shells. When the helium shell burning nears the base of the hydrogen shell, the increased temperature reignites hydrogen fusion and the cycle begins again. The large but brief increase in luminosity from the helium shell flash produces an increase in the visible brightness of the star of a few tenths of a magnitude for several hundred years. These changes are unrelated to the brightness variations on periods of tens to hundreds of days that are common in this type of star.

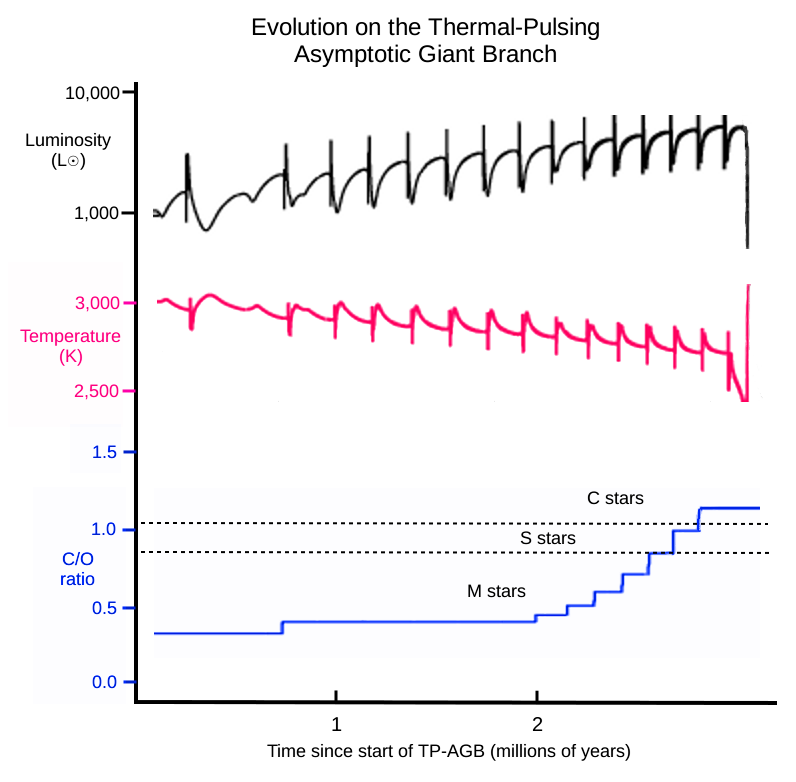
Evolution of a 2 M_{☉} star on the TP-AGB

During the thermal pulses, which last only a few hundred years, material from the core region may be mixed into the outer layers, changing the surface composition, in a process referred to as dredge-up. Because of this dredge-up, AGB stars may show s-process elements in their spectra and strong dredge-ups can lead to the formation of carbon stars. All dredge-ups following thermal pulses are referred to as third dredge-ups, after the first dredge-up, which occurs on the red-giant branch, and the second dredge up, which occurs during the E-AGB. In some cases there may not be a second dredge-up but dredge-ups following thermal pulses will still be called a third dredge-up. Thermal pulses increase rapidly in strength after the first few, so third dredge-ups are generally the deepest and most likely to circulate core material to the surface.

AGB stars are typically long-period variables, and suffer mass loss in the form of a stellar wind. For M-type AGB stars, the stellar winds are most efficiently driven by micron-sized grains. Thermal pulses produce periods of even higher mass loss and may result in detached shells of circumstellar material. A star may lose 50 to 70% of its mass during the AGB phase. The mass-loss rates typically range between 10^{−8} and 10^{−5} M_{☉}/year, and can even reach as high as 10^{−4} M_{☉}/year; while wind velocities are typically between 5 and 30 km/s.

=== Circumstellar envelopes of AGB stars ===
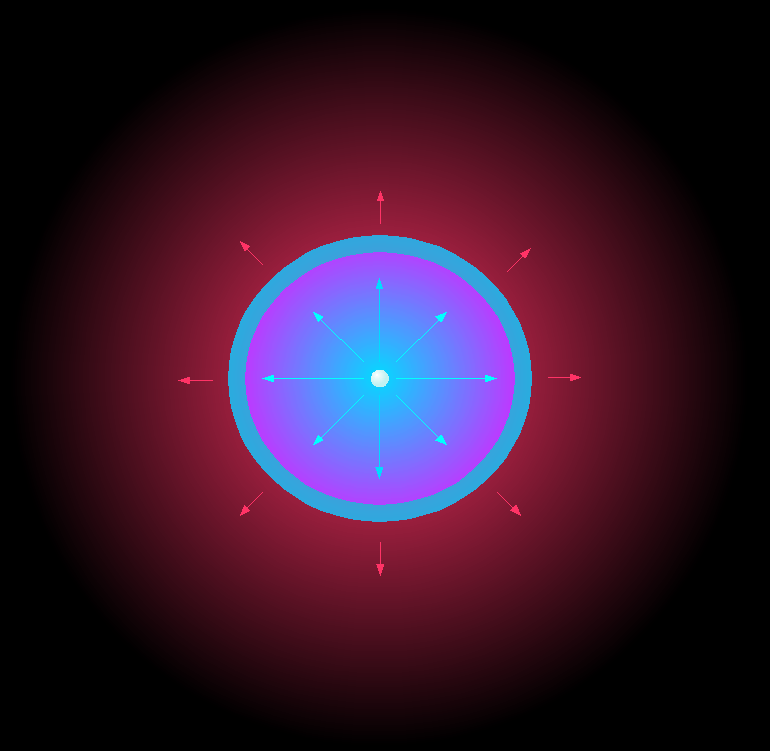
Formation of a planetary nebula at the end of the asymptotic giant branch phase

The extensive mass loss of AGB stars means that they are surrounded by an extended circumstellar envelope (CSE). Given a mean AGB lifetime of one Myr and an outer velocity of 10 km/s, its maximum radius can be estimated to be roughly 3×10^{14} km (30 light years). This is a maximum value since the wind material will start to mix with the interstellar medium at very large radii, and it also assumes that there is no velocity difference between the star and the interstellar gas.

These envelopes have a dynamic and interesting chemistry, much of which is difficult to reproduce in a laboratory environment because of the low densities involved. The nature of the chemical reactions in the envelope changes as the material moves away from the star, expands and cools. Near the star the envelope density is high enough that reactions approach thermodynamic equilibrium. As the material passes beyond about 5×10^{9} km the density falls to the point where kinetics, rather than thermodynamics, becomes the dominant feature. Some energetically favorable reactions can no longer take place in the gas, because the reaction mechanism requires a third body to remove the energy released when a chemical bond is formed. In this region many of the reactions that do take place involve radicals such as OH (in oxygen rich envelopes) or CN (in the envelopes surrounding carbon stars). In the outermost region of the envelope, beyond about 5×10^{11} km, the density drops to the point where the dust no longer completely shields the envelope from interstellar UV radiation and the gas becomes partially ionized. These ions then participate in reactions with neutral atoms and molecules. Finally as the envelope merges with the interstellar medium, most of the molecules are destroyed by UV radiation.

The temperature of the CSE is determined by heating and cooling properties of the gas and dust, but drops with radial distance from the photosphere of the stars which are 2,000–3,000 K. Chemical peculiarities of an AGB CSE outwards include:

- Photosphere: Local thermodynamic equilibrium chemistry
- Pulsating stellar envelope: Shock chemistry
- Dust formation zone
- Chemically quiet
- Interstellar ultraviolet radiation and photodissociation of molecules – complex chemistry

The dichotomy between oxygen-rich and carbon-rich stars has an initial role in determining whether the first condensates are oxides or carbides, since the least abundant of these two elements will likely remain in the gas phase as CO_{x}.

In the dust formation zone, refractory elements and compounds (Fe, Si, MgO, etc.) are removed from the gas phase and end up in dust grains. The newly formed dust will immediately assist in surface catalyzed reactions. The stellar winds from AGB stars are sites of cosmic dust formation, and are believed to be the main production sites of dust in the universe.

The stellar winds of AGB stars (Mira variables and OH/IR stars) are also often the site of maser emission. The molecules that account for this are SiO, H_{2}O, OH, HCN, and SiS. SiO, H_{2}O, and OH masers are typically found in oxygen-rich M-type AGB stars such as R Cassiopeiae and U Orionis, while HCN and SiS masers are generally found in carbon stars such as IRC +10216. S-type stars with masers are uncommon.

After these stars have lost nearly all of their envelopes, and only the core regions remain, they evolve further into short-lived protoplanetary nebula. The final fate of the AGB envelopes are represented by planetary nebulae (PNe).

=== Physical samples ===
Physical samples, known as presolar grains, of mineral grains from AGB stars are available for laboratory analysis in the form of individual refractory presolar grains. These formed in the circumstellar dust envelopes and were transported to the early Solar System by stellar wind. A majority of presolar silicon carbide grains have their origin in 1–3 M_{☉} carbon stars in the late thermally-pulsing AGB phase of their stellar evolution.

=== Late thermal pulse ===
As many as a quarter of all post-AGB stars undergo what is dubbed a "born-again" episode. The carbon–oxygen core is now surrounded by helium with an outer shell of hydrogen. If the helium is re-ignited a thermal pulse occurs and the star quickly returns to the AGB, becoming a helium-burning, hydrogen-deficient stellar object. If the star still has a hydrogen-burning shell when this thermal pulse occurs, it is termed a "late thermal pulse". Otherwise it is called a "very late thermal pulse".

The outer atmosphere of the born-again star develops a stellar wind and the star once more follows an evolutionary track across the Hertzsprung–Russell diagram. However, this phase is very brief, lasting only about 200 years before the star again heads toward the white dwarf stage. Observationally, this late thermal pulse phase appears almost identical to a Wolf–Rayet star in the midst of its own planetary nebula.

Stars such as Sakurai's Object and FG Sagittae are being observed as they rapidly evolve through this phase.

Mapping the circumstellar magnetic fields of thermal-pulsating (TP-) AGB stars has recently been reported using the so-called Goldreich-Kylafis effect.

=== Super-AGB stars ===
The high mass counterpart of AGB stars are called Super-AGB stars. These stars have initial masses sufficient to burn carbon but too little mass to ignite neon and progress to iron core collapse supernova. They have masses above 9 M_{☉} to 12 M_{☉}.. The carbon burning sequence in these stars yields a NeO core which resembles the AGB core but with more mass. If the core mass can reach $M_{EC}$, 1.37 M_{☉}, electron capture can cause core collapse to a neutron star. The conditions for this event are complex. Observations have produced some candidates for electron-capture nova but solid identification has not yet been achieved.

== See also ==
- Mira – Binary star system in the constellation Cetus
