= Taketa (disambiguation) =

Taketa is a city located in Ōita Prefecture, Japan. Taketa may also refer to:

- Shinichi Taketa (born 1967), a Japanese journalist and newscaster
- Mandie Taketa, ex-wife of Wayne Brady
- Taketa, a character in the 2009 film, The Message
