= Morita (surname) =

Morita (written: 森田, 盛田 or 守田) is a Japanese surname. Notable people with the surname include:

- Akio Morita (盛田 昭夫; 1921–1999), co-founder of the Sony Corporation
- Ayumi Morita (森田 あゆみ; born 1990), Japanese tennis player
- Doji Morita (森田 童子; 1953–2018), Japanese psych folk singer-songwriter
- Morita Fukui (福井 盛太; 1885–1965), former commissioner of Nippon Professional Baseball
- Hidemasa Morita (守田 英正; born 1995), Japanese footballer
- Hiroyuki Morita (森田 宏幸; born 1964), Japanese animation director
- Hisao Morita (盛田 久生; born 1939), Japanese pole vaulter
- June Morita, American statistics educator
- Jungo Morita (森田 淳悟; born 1947), Japanese volleyball player
- Kaori Morita (森田 香織; born 1995), Japanese long-distance runner
- Kazuyoshi Morita (森田 一義; born 1945), or Tamori (タモリ), Japanese celebrity
- Kiiti Morita (森田 紀一; 1915–1995), Japanese mathematician
- Koichi Morita (army officer)
- Koichi Morita (songwriter) (森田 公一; born 1940), Japanese composer and singer
- Koki Morita (森田 晃樹; born 2000), Japanese footballer
- Kyohei Morita (森田 恭平; born 1984), Japanese rugby union footballer
- Masakatsu Morita (森田 必勝; 1945–1970), Tatenokai member
- Masakazu Morita (森田 成一; born 1972), Japanese actor
- Masatake Morita (森田 正馬; 1874–1938), also known as Morita Shoma, founder of Morita Therapy
- Michihiro Morita (森田 道博; born 1970), Japanese Go player
- Pat Morita, or Noriyuki Morita, Japanese-American actor
- Shuichi Morita (森田 修一; born 1965), Japanese long-distance runner
- Sohei Morita (森田 草平; 1881–1949), Japanese author
- Suzuka Morita (森田 涼花; born 1992), Japanese actress
- Tama Morita (森田 たま; 1894–1970), Japanese essayist and legislator
- Tomomi Morita (森田 智己; born 1984), Japanese swimmer
- Yasumichi Morita (森田 恭通; born 1967), Japanese interior designer
- Yoshimitsu Morita (森田 芳光; 1950–2011), Japanese film director
- Shigeru Morita (森田茂; 1907–2009) Japanese painter
- Keisaku Morita (森田 慶作; born 1980), Japanese drummer

== Fictional characters ==
- Gwen Morita (森田 グエン), a character in the webcomic Sleepless Domain
- Jim Morita, a character in the comic book series Sgt. Fury and his Howling Commandos
- Yukari Morita (森田 ゆかり), the protagonist of the light novel series Rocket Girls
