= Ueda (surname) =

Ueda (上田 or 植田), romanized as Uyeda in an old version of Hepburn romanization, is the 60th most common Japanese surname. Notable people with the surname include:

- Ai Ueda (上田藍; born 1983), professional triathlete
- Akinari Ueda (1734–1809), Japanese author, scholar and waka poet
- Akira Ueda (上田 晃; born 1970), video game designer
- Arisawa Ueda (上田有沢; 1850–1921), Imperial Japanese Navy admiral
- Ayase Ueda (上田 綺世; born 1998), Japanese footballer
- Bin Ueda (上田 敏; 1874–1916), writer and translator
- Fumito Ueda (上田 文人; born 1970), video game designer
- Haruka Ueda (上田 春佳; born 1988), Japanese swimmer
- Hatsumi Ueda, (上田 初美; born 1988) Japanese shogi player
- Herbert T. Ueda, American ice drilling engineer
- Hiroki Ueda, (上田 泰己; born 1975) Japanese biologist
- Hiroshi Ueda (上田 裕司; 1940–2011), Japanese professional wrestler
- Jin Ueda (上田 仁; born 1991), Japanese table tennis player
- Kana Ueda (植田 佳奈; born 1980), Japanese singer and voice actress
- Katsuji Ueda (上田 勝次; 1945–2017), Japanese kickboxer, martial artist and professional wrestler
- Kazuo Ueda (植田 和男; born 1951), Japanese economist and 32nd governor of the Bank of Japan
- Kazuo Ueda (上田和夫; born 1942 or 1943), Japanese Yiddishist
- Keisuke Ueda (植田 圭輔; born 1989), Japanese actor, voice actor and singer
- Ken-ichi Ueda (植田 憲一), Japanese laser scientist
- Kenkichi Ueda (植田謙吉; 1875–1962), general in the Imperial Japanese Army during the Second Sino-Japanese War
- Makiko Ueda (上田 真基子; born 1959), Japanese professional wrestler
- Makoto Ueda (architecture critic) (植田実; born 1935), editor and architecture critic
- Makoto Ueda (poetry critic) (上田真; 1931–2020), professor, author of numerous books about Japanese poetry
- Masaharu Ueda (上田正治; 1938–2025), Japanese cinematographer
- Miyuki Ueda (上田みゆき; 1944), Japanese actress and voice actress
- Reina Ueda (上田 麗奈; born 1994), Japanese voice actress and singer
- Rinko Ueda, (上田 倫子; born 1970) Japanese manga artist
- Ryoya Ueda (上田 陵弥; born 1989), Japanese footballer
- Ryujiro Ueda (植田 龍仁朗; born 1988), Japanese footballer
- Seiji Ueda (上田清二; born 1952), astronomer, asteroid hunter
- Shinji Ueda (植田信治; 1928–2001), newspaper editor and professional wrestling on-screen character
- Shinya Ueda (上田 晋也; born 1970), Japanese comedian and television presenter
- Shizuteru Ueda (上田 閑照; 1926–2019), Japanese philosopher specializing in philosophy of religion
- Shoji Ueda (cinematographer) (上田正治; 1938–2025), Japanese cinematographer
- Shōji Ueda (植田 正治; 1913–2000), photographer
- Sōko Ueda (上田 宗箇; 1563–1650), Japanese samurai
- Takahiro Ueda (上田 岳弘), Japanese writer
- Takuma Ueda (上田 拓馬; born 1989), Japanese badminton player
- Tatsuya Ueda (上田 竜也; born 1983), member of Japanese boy band Kat-tun
- Toshiko Ueda (上田 トシコ; 1917–2008), manga artist
- Toyozo Ueda (上田 豊三; born 1937), Japanese Supreme Court justice
- Yōji Ueda (上田 燿司; born 1974), Japanese voice actor
- Yūji Ueda (上田 祐司; born 1967), Japanese voice actor

== See also ==
- Ueta, a Japanese surname written the same way
