= Sugawara =

Sugawara (written: 菅原 lit. "sedge field"), also read as Sugahara, is a Japanese surname. Notable people with the surname include:

- Sugawara no Kiyotomo (770–842), Japanese courtier and bureaucrat of the early Heian period
- Sugawara no Michizane (845–903), Japanese scholar, poet, and politician of the Heian period
- Sugawara no Koreyoshi (812–880), Japanese noble and scholar of the early Heian period
- Bunta Sugawara (1933–2014), Japanese actor
- Chieko Sugawara (born 1976), Japanese fencer
- Hiroshi Sugawara (born 1955), Japanese film director, film producer, and screenwriter
- Hirotaka Sugawara (born 1938), Japanese physicist
- Isshu Sugawara (born 1962), Japanese politician
- Julia Sugawara (born 1982), Canadian rugby union player
- Kazuhiko Sugawara (born 1927), Japanese former speed skater
- Koichi Sugawara (菅原 貢一, born 1950), Japanese bobsledder
- Kota Sugawara (born 1985), Japanese football player
- Ryunosuke Sugawara (菅原 龍之助, born 2000), Japanese footballer
- Sadatoshi Sugawara (born 1939), Japanese former volleyball player
- Shinobu Sugawara (born 1980), Japanese professional wrestler
- Sayuri Sugawara (born 1990), Japanese singer
- Takeo Sugawara (菅原 武男, born 1938), Japanese hammer thrower
- Taro Sugahara (born 1981), Japanese footballer
- Takuya Sugawara (born 1983), Japanese professional wrestler
- Tomo Sugawara (born 1976), Japanese football player
- Tomoko Sugawara, Japanese harpist
- Tsûsai Sugawara (菅原通済 or 菅原通濟, also Tsusai Sugawara, born 1894), Japanese social activist and actor
- Yasaburo Sugawara (born 1952), Japanese former wrestler
- Yoshimasa Sugawara (菅原 義正, born 1941), Japanese rally driver
- Yukinari Sugawara (born 2000), Japanese footballer
