= Tadashi Maeda =

Tadashi Maeda may refer to:

- Tadashi Maeda (admiral) (前田 精, 1898–1977), Imperial Japanese Navy officer during the Pacific War
- Tadashi Maeda (politician) (前田 正, 1946–2013), Japanese politician who served two terms in the House of Representatives
- Tadashi Maeda (banker) (前田 匡史, born 1957), executive of the Japan Bank for International Cooperation
