= Naoki Maeda =

Naoki Maeda may refer to:

- Naoki Maeda (composer) (born 1969), Japanese composer
- Naoki Maeda (footballer, born 1994), Japanese footballer
- Naoki Maeda (footballer, born 1996), Japanese footballer
