= Takata Station =

Takata Station (高田駅) is the name of multiple train stations in Japan:

- Takata Station (Fukuoka)
- Takata Station (Kagawa)
- Takata Station (Kanagawa)

== See also ==
- 高田駅 (disambiguation)
- Kōda Station (disambiguation)
- Takada Station (disambiguation)
