= Michiko Fujiwara =

Japanese nurse and politician

- 藤原 道子
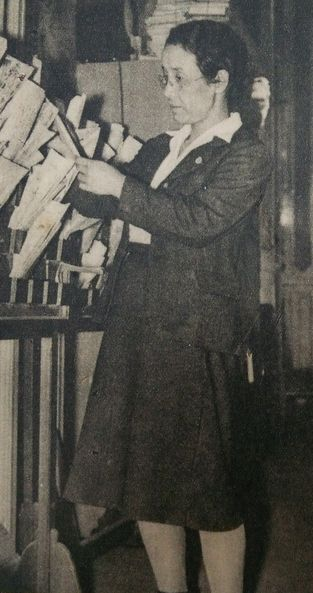
- Fujiwara in 1948

Member of the House of Councillors
- In office 4 June 1950 – 7 July 1974
- Preceded by: Constituency established
- Succeeded by: Multi-member district
- Constituency: National district

Member of the House of Representatives
- In office 10 April 1946 – 23 December 1948
- Preceded by: Constituency established
- Succeeded by: Saburō Endō
- Constituency: Shizuoka at-large (1946–1947); Shizuoka 2nd (1947–1948)

Personal details
- Born: 26 May 1900 Kojima, Okayama, Japan
- Died: 26 April 1983 (aged 82)
- Party: Socialist (1946–1951; 1955–1974)
- Other political affiliations: Left Socialist (1951–1955)
- Spouse: Kenji Yamazaki (m. 1925; div. 1948)

Michiko Fujiwara (藤原 道子, Fujiwara Michiko; 26 May 1900 – 26 April 1983) was a Japanese nurse and politician. She initially campaigned for her husband, the politician Kenji Yamazaki, but when he returned from the war with a new wife and child she ran against him. She defeated him as a candidate from the Socialist Party of Japan. She would become concerned with fighting child prostitution.
