= Seiko Takata =

Japanese dancer

- 高田せい子
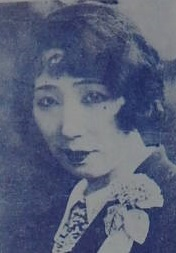
- Takata Seiko, from a 1930 publication
- Born: Sawano Sei; September 13, 1895; Kanazawa, Ishikawa Prefecture, Japan
- Died: March 19, 1977 (age 81); Tokyo, Japan
- Other names: Hara Seiko, Takada Seiko
- Occupation: Dancer

Seiko Takata (September 13, 1895 – March 19, 1977; in Japanese, 高田せい子, or kana, たかた せいこ ), born Sawano Sei, was a Japanese dancer and dance educator. She is considered a pioneer of modern dance in Japan.

== Early life and education ==
Sawano Sei was born in Kanazawa, Ishikawa Prefecture. She moved to Tokyo as a young woman, to attend music school. She trained as a dancer with Enrico Cecchetti, Giovanni Vittorio Rosi, Mary Wigman, Doris Humphrey, Ted Shawn and Ruth St. Denis.

== Career ==
With her dancer husband, Takata ran the Takata Dancing Society, and toured and studied in Europe and the United States. Their duo dancing act was sometimes billed as "Seiko and Takata" on variety bills. She was a member of the Imperial Theatre, the Negishi Kabukikan and the Asakusa Opera. They were in London when the Great Kanto Earthquake devastated Tokyo in 1923. They returned to Japan in the autumn of 1924, but many of their professional connections were lost in the quake's aftermath.

In widowhood, Takata continued performing, and taught dance at the Takatas' school and in other settings. After World War II she co-founded the Takata/Yamada Dance Company with Yamada Goro, and was president of the All-Japan Art Dance Association. She is considered one of the founders of modern dance in Japan, alongside Baku Ishii and Eguchi Takaya.

Takata's students included Japanese dancer Erika Akoh and Chinese dancer Xiaobang Wu. Choreographer Tatsumi Hijikata trained with a student of Takata's. Modern artist Zenzaburo Kojima painted a portrait of Takata in a Spanish dance costume in 1929.

== Personal life and legacy ==
Sawano married fellow dancer Masao Takata in 1918. Her husband died from tuberculosis in 1929. She died in 1977, at the age of 81, in Tokyo. A Takata/Yamada Dance Company and Martha Graham Dance Company alumna, Miki Orihara, performed Takata's "Mother" (1938) in San Francisco and New York in 2019.
