= Tohoku Mathematical Journal =

- Cover of TMJ
- Discipline: Mathematics
- Language: English
- Edited by: Masanori Ishida

Publication details
- Former name: Tôhoku Mathematical Journal
- History: 1911–1943 (1st Series); 1949–present (2nd Series)
- Publisher: Maruzen Co. (Japan)
- Frequency: Quarterly

Standard abbreviations
- ISO 4: Tohoku Math. J.

Indexing
- ISSN: 0040-8735
- LCCN: 16004044
- OCLC no.: 1642556

Links
- Journal homepage; About TMJ

The Tohoku Mathematical Journal is a mathematical research journal published by Tohoku University in Japan. It was founded in August 1911 by Tsuruichi Hayashi.

== History ==
Due to World War II the publication of the journal stopped in 1943 with volume 49. Publication was resumed in 1949 with the volume numbering starting again at 1. In order to distinguish between the identical numbered volumes, volumes in the first publishing period are referred to as the first series whereas the later volumes are called second series.

Before volume 51 of the second series the journal was called Tôhoku Mathematical Journal, with a circumflex over the second letter of Tohoku.

== Selected papers ==
- Sprague, R. P. (1936), "Über mathematische Kampfspiele", The Tohoku Mathematical Journal (in German), 41: 438–444, JFM 62.1070.03, Zbl 0013.29004. The first publication of the Sprague–Grundy theorem, the basis for much of combinatorial game theory, later independently rediscovered by P. M. Grundy.
- Weiszfeld, E. (1937), "Sur le point pour lequel la somme des distances de n points donnes est minimum", The Tohoku Mathematical Journal (in French), 43: 355–386. This paper describes Weiszfeld's algorithm for finding the geometric median.
- Grothendieck, Alexander (1957), "Sur quelques points d'algèbre homologique", The Tohoku Mathematical Journal, Second Series (in French), 9: 119–221, MR 0102537. This paper, often referred to as "The Tohoku paper" or simply "Tohoku", introduced the axioms of abelian categories.
- Sasaki, Shigeo (1960), "On differentiable manifolds with certain structures which are closely related to almost contact structure. I", The Tohoku Mathematical Journal, Second Series, 12 (3): 459–476, doi:10.2748/tmj/1178244407, MR 0123263. Part II, 13: 281–294, 1961, doi:10.2748/tmj/1178244304, MR 0138065. The introduction of Sasakian manifolds.
