= Shōgo Shimada =

Shōgo Shimada may refer to:

- Shōgo Shimada (actor) (島田 正吾, 1905–2004)
- Shogo Shimada (footballer) (嶋田 正吾, born 1979)
