= Tsuruichi Hayashi =

Tsuruichi Hayashi (林 鶴一, Hayashi Tsuruichi, June 13, 1873 – October 4, 1935) was a Japanese mathematician and historian of Japanese mathematics. He was born in Tokushima, Japan.

He was the founder of the Tohoku Mathematical Journal.
