= Kanda Station =

Kanda Station may refer to:

- Kanda Station (Tokyo) (神田駅) on the Yamanote Line and Keihin-Tohoku Line, etc.
- Kanda Station (Fukuoka) (苅田駅) on the Nippo Main Line
