= Takeda (disambiguation) =

Takeda is a Japanese family name. It may also refer to:

- The Takeda clan
- Takeda (video game), a PC video game based on the life of Takeda Shingen
- Takeda Shrine, a Shinto shrine in Kōfu, Yamanashi Prefecture, Japan
- Takeda Pharmaceutical Company, a Japanese pharmaceutical company
- 4965 Takeda, an asteroid
- Takahashi Takeda, a character in the Mortal Kombat video games
- Takeda Station (Kyoto), a railway station
- Takeda Station (Hyōgo), a railway station
- Taketa, Ōita, a city
