= Shimada Mitsufusa =

Japanese botanical illustrator

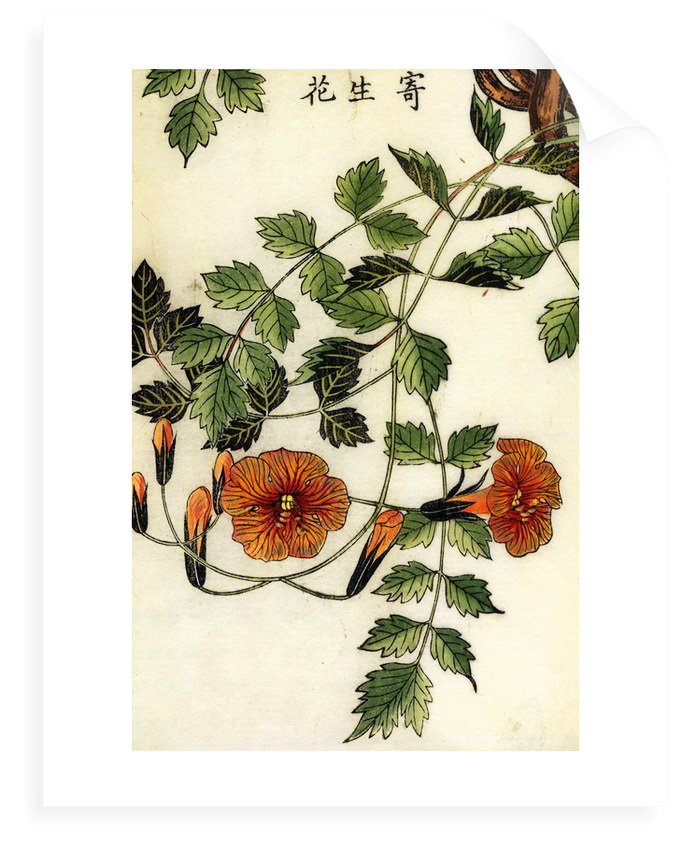
Campsis grandiflora

Shimada Mitsufusa (島田 充房) was an 18th-century Japanese botanical illustrator best known for his work, Ka-i 花彙, portraying Japanese flora with 200 woodcut plates in 8 volumes. The first volume was published in Edo in 1759, but after completing the second volume Mitsufusa found the work too taxing and enlisted the aid of Ono Ranzan. Ludovic Savatier (1830-1891) translated the work into French, a version published in 1875. This work, together with two other Japanese works by Iwasaki Tsunemasa and Iinuma Yokusai, was the basis of Franchet and Savatier's 'Enumeratio Plantarum in Japonia Sponte Crescentium' (1875–79).
