= Taniguchi =

Taniguchi (written: 谷口 lit. "valley mouth") is the 92nd most common Japanese surname. Notable people with the surname include:

- Akemi Taniguchi (谷口 明見; born 1937), Japanese Nordic combined skier
- Brian Taniguchi (born 1951), American politician
- Gorō Taniguchi (谷口 悟朗; born 1966), Japanese anime director
- Hiromi Taniguchi (谷口 浩美; born 1960), Japanese long-distance runner
- Hiroyuki Taniguchi (谷口 博之; born 1985), Japanese footballer
- Itaru Taniguchi (谷口 到; born 1984), Japanese rugby union player
- Jiro Taniguchi (谷口 ジロー; 1947–2017), Japanese manga artist
- Kotaro Taniguchi (谷口 耕太郎; born 1994), Japanese sprinter
- Makoto Taniguchi (谷口 誠; born 1930), Japanese diplomat and academic
- Masaharu Taniguchi (谷口 雅春; 1893–1985), Japanese New Thought leader
- Masami Taniguchi (谷口雅美; born 1976), Japanese volleyball player
- Masatomo Taniguchi (谷口 正朋; born 1946), Japanese basketball player
- Naomi Taniguchi (谷口 尚己), Japanese motorcycle racer
- Nobuteru Taniguchi (谷口 信輝; born 1971), Japanese racing driver
- Noriko Taniguchi (谷口 令子; born 1992), Japanese rugby sevens player
- Norio Taniguchi (谷口 紀男; 1912–1999), Japanese scientist
- Senkichi Taniguchi (谷口 千吉; 1912–2007), Japanese film director and screenwriter
- Shinya Taniguchi (谷口 晋矢; 1981–2013), Japanese swimmer
- Shogo Taniguchi (谷口 彰悟; born 1991), Japanese footballer
- Shuhei Taniguchi (谷口 周平; born 1976), better known as Maybach Taniguchi, Japanese professional wrestler
- Sumiteru Taniguchi (谷口 稜曄; 1929–2017), Japanese atomic bomb survivor and anti-nuclear activist
- Tadatsugu Taniguchi (谷口 維紹; born 1948), Japanese immunologist
- Toru Taniguchi (谷口 徹; born 1968), Japanese golfer
- Yoshio Taniguchi (谷口 吉生; 1937–2024), Japanese architect
- Yoshirō Taniguchi (谷口 吉郎; 1904–1979), Japanese architect
- Yuki Taniguchi (谷口 由紀; born 1993), Japanese shogi player
- Yukinori Taniguchi (谷口 行規; born 1968), Japanese racing driver, founder of Yuke's
- Yuya Taniguchi (谷口 雄也; born 1992), Japanese baseball player

== Fictional characters ==
- Harumi Taniguchi (谷口 はるみ), a character in the manga series Citrus
- Suzu Taniguchi (谷口鈴), Taniguchi Suzu, a character in the Light Novel Series Arifureta

== See also ==
- 8571 Taniguchi, a main-belt asteroid
