= Cherry Kinoshita =

Japanese American activist

Cherry Tanaka Kinoshita
- Born: Cherry Chieko Tanaka; October 13, 1923; Seattle, Washington
- Died: July 29, 2008 (aged 84) July 29, 2008; Seattle, Washington
- Education: University of Washington
- Organization: Japanese American Citizens League
- Spouses: Masao Kinoshita (m. 1948; died 2006)
- Children: 1
- Parents: Eiichi Tanaka (father); Yo Tanaka (mother)

Cherry Tanaka Kinoshita (Japanese: 木下 千枝子, October 13, 1923 – July 29, 2008) was a Japanese American activist and leader in the Japanese American Citizens League (JACL). She helped found the Seattle Evacuation Redress Committee and fought for financial compensation for Japanese Americans who had been incarcerated during World War II.

== Early life ==
Cherry Kinoshita was born in Seattle, Washington, on October 13, 1923, to Eiichi and Yo Tanaka. She grew up in the Green Lake neighborhood and graduated from Lincoln High School in 1941. Her parents owned a local dry-cleaning business.

== Career and activism ==
=== Before World War II (1941–1942) ===
In December 1941, a few months after Kinoshita graduated from high school, the Imperial Japanese Navy attacked the Pearl Harbor naval base in Hawaii. After the attack on Pearl Harbor, the Federal Bureau of Investigation (FBI) investigated Japanese residents in the U.S. The FBI surveilled and interrogated Japanese Americans prior to and during WWII and conducted raids on Japanese American homes. Kinoshita's father was questioned by the FBI for owning a shortwave radio.

On February 19, 1942, President Franklin D. Roosevelt signed Executive Order 9066. The Order authorized the incarceration of all Japanese Americans (both those born in the U.S. and those born in Japan). Around 110,000 Japanese Americans were removed from their homes on the West Coast and relocated to internment camps. Executive Order 9066 also allowed John L. DeWitt, the Lieutenant General of the Western Defense Command and a strong supporter of internment, to place a curfew on Japanese Americans. This curfew was imposed throughout the West Coast, and included citizens like Kinoshita who were living in Seattle. In an interview, Kinoshita recalled that the curfew instilled a sense of fear in her community and that the FBI would pick up people who disobeyed the restrictions. The curfew was famously broken by Gordon Hirabayashi, who challenged the legality of the order. In Hirabayashi v. United States, the United States Supreme Court held that the curfew was constitutional because it was deemed a necessity during a time of war.

In addition to the placing of a curfew on all Japanese Americans and as part of Executive Order 9066, General John L. DeWitt passed Civilian Exclusion Orders. Accompanying these orders to systematically remove and relocate Japanese Americans were "Instructions to All Persons of Japanese Ancestry". Kinoshita and her family were instructed to report to Union Station before further transfers. In addition to information about where and when "all persons of Japanese ancestry, both alien and non-alien", should report, the instructions also stated which items each family should bring. Included in those items were clothing, beddings and linens, and utensils, all limited by what they could carry by hand. When Kinoshita was asked in an interview what she brought to the internment camp, she recalled that bedding took up most of the space.

As a result of their forced removal, Japanese Americans also had to sell many of their belongings before leaving. Kinoshita's family was unable to sell the family cleaning business and was only able to sell the cleaning equipment, like the pressing machine, for around $50. It is estimated that the total economic loss to Japanese Americans during World War II (WWII) was around $1-3 billion (before adjusting for inflation).

In addition to selling their goods and property below value, many Japanese Americans had their homes looted. When FBI agents and police officers performed interrogations, they broke into homes and made it easy for criminals to enter. After the Japanese American families left their homes for internment camps, an estimated 80% of their belongings that were stored by private companies were stolen.

=== During internment (1942–1945) ===
During WWII, Kinoshita was first incarcerated at the Puyallup Assembly Center in Washington State before being transferred to the Minidoka Concentration Camp in Idaho. The Puyallup Assembly Center, also known by the name "Camp Harmony", was a temporary holding location for Japanese Americans who would later be sent to internment camps including Minidoka, Tule Lake, and Heart Mountain. Residents, like Kinoshita, came from the Seattle area as well as from Tacoma and the state of Alaska. Puyallup was in use from April 28, 1942, to September 12, 1942. Kinoshita was one of 7,390 Japanese Americans held at Puyallup before being transferred to another detention site.

Following her time at Puyallup, Kinoshita was held at the Minidoka War Relocation Center. Kinoshita was one of more than 13,000 Japanese Americans to be held at Minidoka. The Center was active from August 10, 1942, to October 28, 1945. The residents were from the states of Washington, Oregon, and Alaska. At Minidoka, the internees published a weekly newspaper that was printed for the residents. The publication, The Minidoka Irrigator, ran from September 10, 1942, to July 28, 1945. Kinoshita "was a reporter and editor for the newspaper, with a column in the newspaper called "Feminidoka", where she wrote about topics such as fashion and hairstyles. In an interview with The Seattle Times, Kinoshita acknowledged that it was challenging to write about meaningless subjects while they were interned. She maintained that while the newspaper writers were not directly rebellious, some of the columns and articles clearly questioned the justification of the Center and of their imprisonment.

=== After World War II (1945-) ===
After WWII, Kinoshita moved back to Seattle with her husband. She joined the Seattle chapter of the Japanese American Citizens League (JACL). The Seattle JACL is the oldest Asian American civil rights organization in the United States. Before Kinoshita joined, the JACL was active during WWII and won the right for Japanese Americans to serve in the U.S. Armed Forces. After the war and across the West Coast, the JACL fought campaigns to promote the rights of Japanese Americans. In California, the JACL worked to repeal California's Alien Land Law, which prevented Asian farmers in the state from owning land until the law was invalidated in 1952. In the same year, the JACL also worked for the passage of the McCarran-Walter Act, which allowed Japanese immigrants, along with other U.S. residents from Asia, to become naturalized citizens.

Kinoshita originally joined the JACL because the group organized social activities like picnics and parties. Kinoshita slowly became involved with the JACL's activism and educational efforts. One event that sparked her interest in the politics of the JACL was the unjust imprisonment of Iva Ikuko Toguri D'Aquino. Toguri (inaccurately called "Tokyo Rose" by Allied soldiers) was a radio broadcaster during WWII for Allied soldiers in the South Pacific. After returning to the U.S. after the war, Toguri was tried and sentenced to 10 years in prison for treason. In 1977, Toguri was pardoned by President Ford due to faults in the trial and confessions of perjury by witnesses. Kinoshita became politically active in the JACL because of incidents like the one with Toguri.

In 1970, Kinoshita attended the JACL National Convention in Chicago where conversations around redress were beginning. At the convention, Edison Uno introduced a resolution that demanded reparations. Kinoshita worked with individuals like Henry Miyatake in the Seattle JACL Chapter to discuss the idea of individual compensation for internment. In 1977, Kinoshita was elected president of the Seattle Chapter of the JACL, the second woman to hold the position since the organization's founding in 1929. She worked with members of her chapter to send out an "Appeal for Action" to JACL Chapters across the nation, urging them to come together to fight for monetary compensation for internment. In her leadership roles in the JACL, Kinoshita helped found the Seattle Evacuation Redress Committee, a committee that formed off of the Seattle JACL to specifically work to address and fight for reparations. Kinoshita later took on additional leadership roles in the JACL, serving both as vice governor of the Northwest district and vice president on the national board.

Kinoshita first met Mike Lowry in 1978 at a campaign dinner for his election to the U.S. House of Representatives. After Lowry won his House seat, he worked with Kinoshita and the Seattle Chapter of the JACL to draft and introduce a redress bill in Congress in 1979. However, instead of supporting Lowry's proposition, Japanese American congressmen worked to pass the Commission on Wartime Relocation and Internment of Civilians Act, sponsored by Senator Daniel Inouye of Hawaii.

When the Commission on Wartime Relocation and Internment of Civilians (CWRIC) was established in 1980, Kinoshita helped prepare community members to attend hearings and to provide testimonies. The CWRIC was a bipartisan effort established by Congress to understand the impact of Executive Order 9066 on Japanese American citizens. The CWRIC hearings were led by a committee of nine federally appointed investigators. The investigators heard from approximately 750 participants in hearings that took place in Washington, D.C., Los Angeles, San Franicsco, Seattle, Chicago, New York City, and Cambridge, Massachusetts between July and December 1981. in July 1981. Hearings were also held at three locations in Alaska to hear from inidgenous Aleuts who had been displaced from their homes during the Japanese occupation of their islands.

In preparation for the hearings in Seattle, Kinoshita booked the venue and led a mock hearing so people could practice testifying.

The results of the CWRIC hearings were compiled into a report called "Personal Justice Denied". The hearings and the report also led to the passage of the Civil Liberties Act of 1988, which provided monetary reparations of $20,000 to individuals who had been placed in internment camps. Signed into law by President Ronald Reagan, the Act also provided a public apology and an education fund to those who were interned. Kinoshita had been instrumental in having a provision removed from the draft legislation which would have denied payment to the estates of eligible persons who died during the payment process.

In addition to fighting for redress on a national level, Kinoshita fought for financial compensation for internees in her home state of Washington. In 1983, Kinoshita and other members of the Seattle JACL successfully lobbied Washington Governor John Spellman to sign a redress bill compensating thirty-eight Japanese American state employees who had been fired because of Executive Order 9066. In Seattle, Kinoshita worked to and was able to secure financial compensation for 27 Nikkei employees in the Seattle school district, all women, who had been forced to resign in 1942 in response to the attack on Pearl Harbor.

== Personal life ==
Kinoshita met her husband, Masao Kinoshita, at the Minidoka Internment Camp and they married in 1948. For two years during WWII, her husband served in the U.S. Military Intelligence Service in Japan. When the couple moved back to Seattle after the war, they started their family in the Mount Baker neighborhood before moving to the south part of Beacon Hill. Kinoshita helped run the family business, Capitol Hill Automotive. In 1953, Kinoshita gave birth to their son, Kyle.

At age 60, Kinoshita attended the University of Washington where she received a bachelor's degree in sociology. She graduated in 1984 with honors.

On July 29, 2008, Cherry Kinoshita died at Swedish Hospital in Seattle, Washington, two weeks before the twentieth anniversary of the Civil Liberties Act of 1988.

== Awards and honors ==
In 2004, Governor Mike Lowry nominated Kinoshita for the Washington State Jefferson Award for her work fighting for Japanese redress and promoting the Civil Liberties Act of 1988. The Jefferson Award is given at both the local and national level to outstanding community members who fight for justice. Kinoshita was also a finalist for the 2008 AARP Purpose Prize.

The JACL honors Kinoshita's legacy by offering a Cherry and Mas Kinoshita scholarship. The scholarship is given to individuals of Japanese ancestry or members of the Seattle JACL who are pursuing degrees or careers in areas such as political science, education, and Asian American Studies.
