= Sakurai's Object =

Star in the constellation Sagittarius

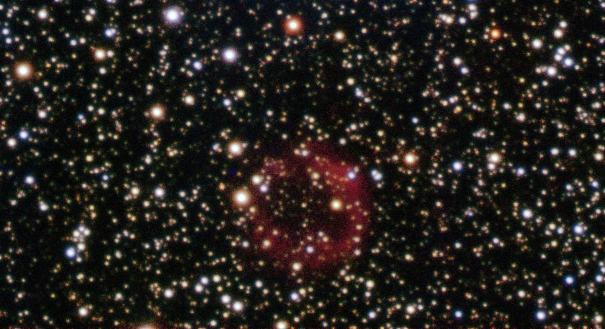
- Sakurai's Object (photo by ESO)

Observation data Epoch J2000.0 Equinox ICRS
- Constellation: Sagittarius
- Right ascension: 17^{h} 52^{m} 32.69^{s}
- Declination: −17° 41′ 08.0″
- Apparent magnitude (V): 10.90 - 21

Characteristics
- Spectral type: variable
- Apparent magnitude (J): 11.555±0.022
- U−B color index: +0.27
- B−V color index: +0.81
- V−R color index: +0.57

Astrometry
| Radial velocity (R_{v}) | −170±30 km/s |
| Distance | 1800-5000 pc |

Details
| Mass | 0.6 M_{☉} |
| Luminosity | ~10,000 L_{☉} |

Other designations
- V4334 Sgr, V4334 Sagittarii, 2MASS J17523269-1741080, DPV 1, Sakurai's variable, PN G010.4+04.4, GSC2 S2202011182877, Sakurai's Object, AAVSO 1746-17

Database references
| SIMBAD | data |

Sakurai's Object (V4334 Sagittarii) is a star in the constellation of Sagittarius. It is thought to have previously been a white dwarf that, as a result of a very late thermal pulse, swelled and became a red giant. It is located at the center of a planetary nebula and is believed to currently be in thermal instability and within its final shell helium flash phase.

At the time of its discovery, astronomers believed Sakurai's Object to be a slow nova. Later spectroscopic analysis suggested that the star was not a nova, but had instead undergone a very late thermal pulse similar to that of V605 Aquilae, causing it to vastly expand. V605 Aquilae, which was discovered in 1919, is the only other star known to have been observed during the high luminosity phase of a very late thermal pulse, and models predict that Sakurai's Object, over the next few decades, will follow a similar life cycle.

Sakurai's Object and other similar stars are expected to end up as helium-rich white dwarfs after retracing their evolution track from the "born-again" giant phase back to the white dwarf cooling track. There are few other suspected "born-again" objects, one example being FG Sagittae. Having erupted in 1995, it is expected that Sakurai's Object's final helium flash will be the first well-observed one.

== Observation history ==
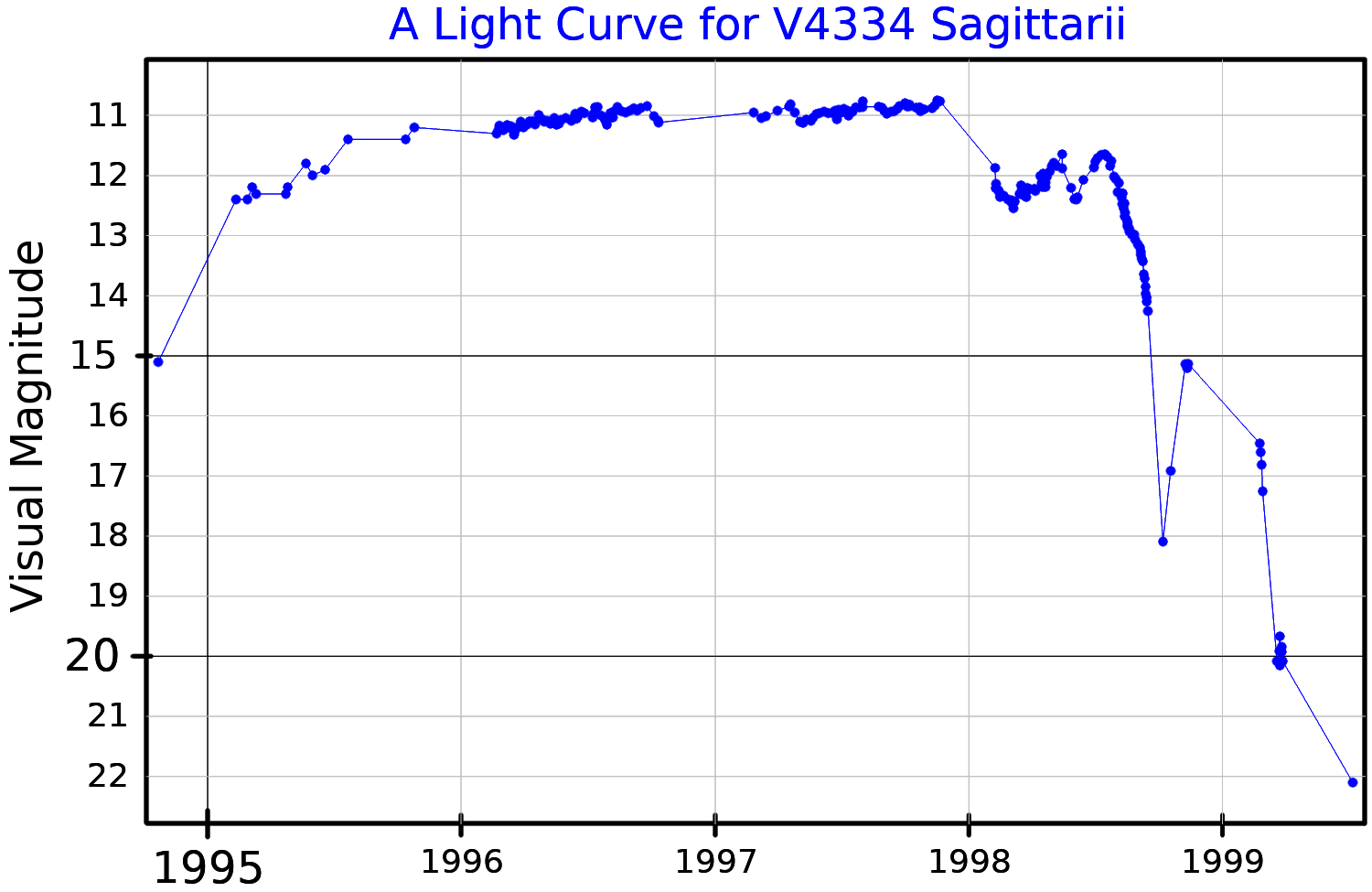
A visual band light curve for V4334 Sagittarii, adapted from Duerbeck (2002)

An International Astronomical Union Circular sent on 23 February 1996 announced the discovery of a "possible 'slow' nova" of magnitude 11.4 by Yukio Sakurai, an amateur astronomer. Japanese astronomer Syuichi Nakano reported the discovery, and that the object had not been visible in images from 1993 nor in photographic plates taken from 1930–1951, despite it appearing to slowly brighten over the previous years. Nakano wrote that "While the outburst [suggests] a slow or symbiotic nova, the lack of obvious emission lines one year after brightening is very unusual."

Following the initial announcement, Hilmar Duerbeck published a study investigating the "possible final helium flash" seen by Sakurai. In it, they noted that the location of Sakurai's Object corresponded to a faint object detected in 1976 of magnitude 21, and discussed other observations in the years 1994–1996, by which time the magnitude had increased to around 11–15. By investigating the measured fluxes, angular diameter, and mass of the nebula, a distance of 5.5 kpc and luminosity of 38 L_{☉} was determined. The researchers noted that this was in agreement with their appearance and model predictions and that the outburst luminosity was in the area of 3100 solar luminosities; lower than predicted by a factor of 3.

The first infrared observations were published in 1998, in which both near and far infrared spectroscopy data was presented. The collected data showed Sakurai's Object's steep brightening in 1996, followed by a sharp decline in 1999 as expected. It was later found that the star's steep decline in light was due to the circumstellar dust located around the star, which was present at a temperature of ~680 K. Further infrared data recorded by the United Kingdom Infrared Telescope was published in 2000, in which findings of the changing absorption lines were discussed.

Observations from the United Kingdom Infrared Telescope (UKIRT) in 1999 revealed that the star is in a RCB-like phase with the release of dust and huge loss of mass. Since 2005, the spectrum shows lines due to photoionised carbon. By 2023, the spectrum had become that of a carbon-rich Wolf-Rayet star.

== Properties ==
Sakurai's Object is a highly evolved post-asymptotic giant branch star which has, following a brief period on the white dwarf cooling track, undergone a helium shell flash (also known as a very late thermal pulse). The star is thought to have a mass of around 0.6 M_{☉}. Observations of Sakurai's Object show increasing reddening and pulsing activity, suggesting that the star is exhibiting thermal instability during its final helium-shell flash.

Prior to its reignition V4334 Sgr is thought to have been cooling towards a white dwarf with a temperature around 100,000 K and a luminosity around 100 L_{☉}. The luminosity rapidly increased about a hundred-fold and then the temperature decreased to around 10,000 K. The star developed the appearance of an F class supergiant (F2 Ia). The apparent temperature continued to cool to below 6,000 K and the star was gradually obscured at optical wavelengths by the formation of carbon dust, similar to an R CrB star. Since then the temperature has increased to around 20,000 K in 2004 and 30,000 K in 2023.

The properties of Sakurai's Object are quite similar to that of V605 Aquilae. V605, discovered in 1919, is the only other known star observed during the high luminosity phase of a very late thermal pulse, and Sakurai's Object is modeled to increase in temperature in the next few decades to match the current state of V605.

=== Dust cloud ===
During the second half of 1998 an optically thick dust shell obscured Sakurai's Object, causing a rapid decrease in visibility of the star, until in 1999 it disappeared from optical wavelength observations altogether. Infrared observations showed that the dust cloud around the star is primarily carbon in an amorphous form. In 2009 it was discovered that the dust shell is strongly asymmetrical, as a disc with a major axis oriented at an angle of 134°, and inclination of around 75°. The disc is thought to be growing more opaque due to the fast spectral evolution of the source towards lower temperatures.

=== Planetary nebula ===
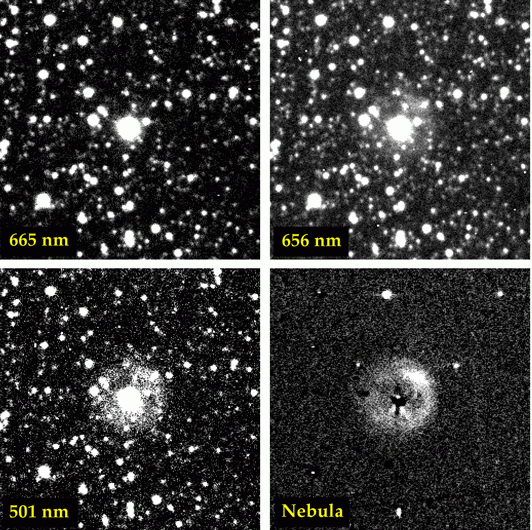
Sakurai's Object, by Hilmar Duerbeck, ESO

Sakurai's Object is surrounded by a planetary nebula created following the star's red giant phase around 8300 years ago. It has been determined that the nebula has a diameter of 44 arcseconds and expansion velocity of roughly 32 km/s.

=== Similarities to other stars ===
Research in 1996 revealed that Sakurai's Object possessed the characteristics of a R Coronae Borealis variable star with the anomaly of Carbon-13 (^{13}C) deficit. Also, the metallicity of Sakurai's object in 1996 was similar to that of V605 Aquilae in 1921. However, it is expected that Sakurai's object will grow in its metallicity to match that of V605 Aquilae.

== Significance in astronomical research ==
A significant amount of new star formation and star destruction data is expected to be recorded from continued observation of Sakurai's Object, as well as be used as reference data in the future research of similar stars. For example, Sakurai's Object is a prime target to study the recombination that occurs after planetary nebulae are ionized, because the conditions would be very difficult to replicate in a laboratory. The reason that stars such as Sakurai's Object and V605 Aquilae exist, as well as experience a shorter lifespan compared to most stars, is largely unknown. Sakurai's Object and V605 Aquilae have been observed experiencing born-again behavior for only 10 years, while FG Sagittae has undergone such behavior for 120 years. It is hypothesized that this is due to Sakurai's Object and V605 Aquilae evolving to the asymptotic giant branch of stars for the first time, while FG Sagittae is undergoing the process a second time.
