= Kōda Station =

Kōda Station is the name of three train stations in Japan:

- Kōda Station (Aichi) (幸田駅) in Kōta, Aichi
- Kōda Station (Nagayo) (高田駅) in Nagayo, Nagasaki
- Kōda Station (Saza) (神田駅) in Saza, Nagasaki

== See also ==
- 高田駅 (disambiguation)
- 神田駅 (disambiguation)
