= Takada (surname) =

Takada (written: 高田 lit. "high ricefield") is a Japanese surname. Notable people with the surname include:

- Junji Takada, Japanese comedian
- Masafumi Takada (高田 雅史; born 1970), Japanese video game music composer
- Minayoshi Takada, Japanese photographer
- Miwa Takada, Japanese actress
- Nahoko Takada (高田なほ子, 1905–1991), Japanese educator, trade unionist, politician, socialist and peace activist
- Nobuhiko Takada, Japanese mixed martial artist
- Shizuo Takada (高田 静夫; born 1947), Japanese footballer and referee
- Shizuo Takada (athlete) (高田 静雄; 1909–1963), Japanese shot putter
- Shōhei Takada (高田 尚平; born 1962), Japanese shogi player
- Yasuo Takada (高田 康雄; born 1950), Japanese swimmer
- Yūki Takada (高田 憂希; born 1993), Japanese voice actress

== Fictional characters ==
- Kiyomi Takada, character in the manga series Death Note
- Ozzie Takada, a character from "That '90s Show"
