= Ueta =

Ueta (written: 植田 or 上田) is a Japanese surname. Notable people with the surname include:

- Miyuki Ueta (上田 美由紀, born 1974), Japanese murderer
- Tatsuya Ueta (植田 辰哉, born 1964), Japanese volleyball player
- Yasushi Ueta (植田 恭史, born 1955), Japanese triple jumper

== See also ==
- 1619 Ueta, a main-belt asteroid
- Ueta Station, a railway station in Toyohashi, Aichi Prefecture, Japan
- Uniform Electronic Transactions Act
- Ueda (disambiguation)
