= Helium flash =

Brief thermal runaway nuclear fusion in the core of low-mass stars

Fusion of helium in the core of low-mass stars.

A helium flash is a very brief thermal runaway nuclear fusion of large quantities of helium into carbon through the triple-alpha process in the core of low-mass stars (between 0.8 solar masses (M_{☉}) and 2.0 M_{☉}) during their red giant phase. The Sun is predicted to experience a flash 1.2 billion years after it leaves the main sequence. A much rarer runaway helium fusion process can also occur on the surface of accreting white dwarf stars.

Low-mass stars do not produce enough gravitational pressure to initiate normal helium fusion. As the hydrogen in the core is exhausted, some of the helium left behind is instead compacted into degenerate matter, supported against gravitational collapse by quantum mechanical pressure rather than thermal pressure. Subsequent hydrogen shell fusion further increases the mass of the core until it reaches temperature of approximately 100 million kelvins, which is hot enough to initiate helium fusion (or "helium burning") in the core.

However, a property of degenerate matter is that increases in temperature do not produce an increase in the pressure of the matter until the thermal pressure becomes so very high that it exceeds degeneracy pressure. In main-sequence stars, thermal expansion regulates the core temperature, but in degenerate cores, this does not occur. Helium fusion increases the temperature, which increases the fusion rate, which further increases the temperature in a runaway reaction, which quickly spans the entire core. This produces a flash of very intense helium fusion that lasts only a few minutes, but during that time, produces energy at a rate comparable to the entire Milky Way galaxy.

In the case of normal low-mass stars, the vast energy release causes much of the core to come out of degeneracy, allowing it to thermally expand. This consumes most of the total energy released by the helium flash, and any left-over energy is absorbed into the star's upper layers. Thus the helium flash is mostly undetectable by observation and is described solely by astrophysical models. After the core's expansion and cooling, the star's surface rapidly cools and contracts in as little as 10,000 years until it is roughly 2% of its former radius and luminosity. It is estimated that the electron-degenerate helium core weighs about 40% of the star mass and that 6% of the core is converted into carbon.

== Subflashes ==
Subflashes are pulsational instabilities that occur after the main helium flash. They are driven by stars that do not have good convective or radiative boundaries. Subflashes can last several hours to days and can occur for many years with each subsequent flash generally being weaker. Subflashes can be detected by applying Fourier transforms to the light curve data.

== Red giants ==
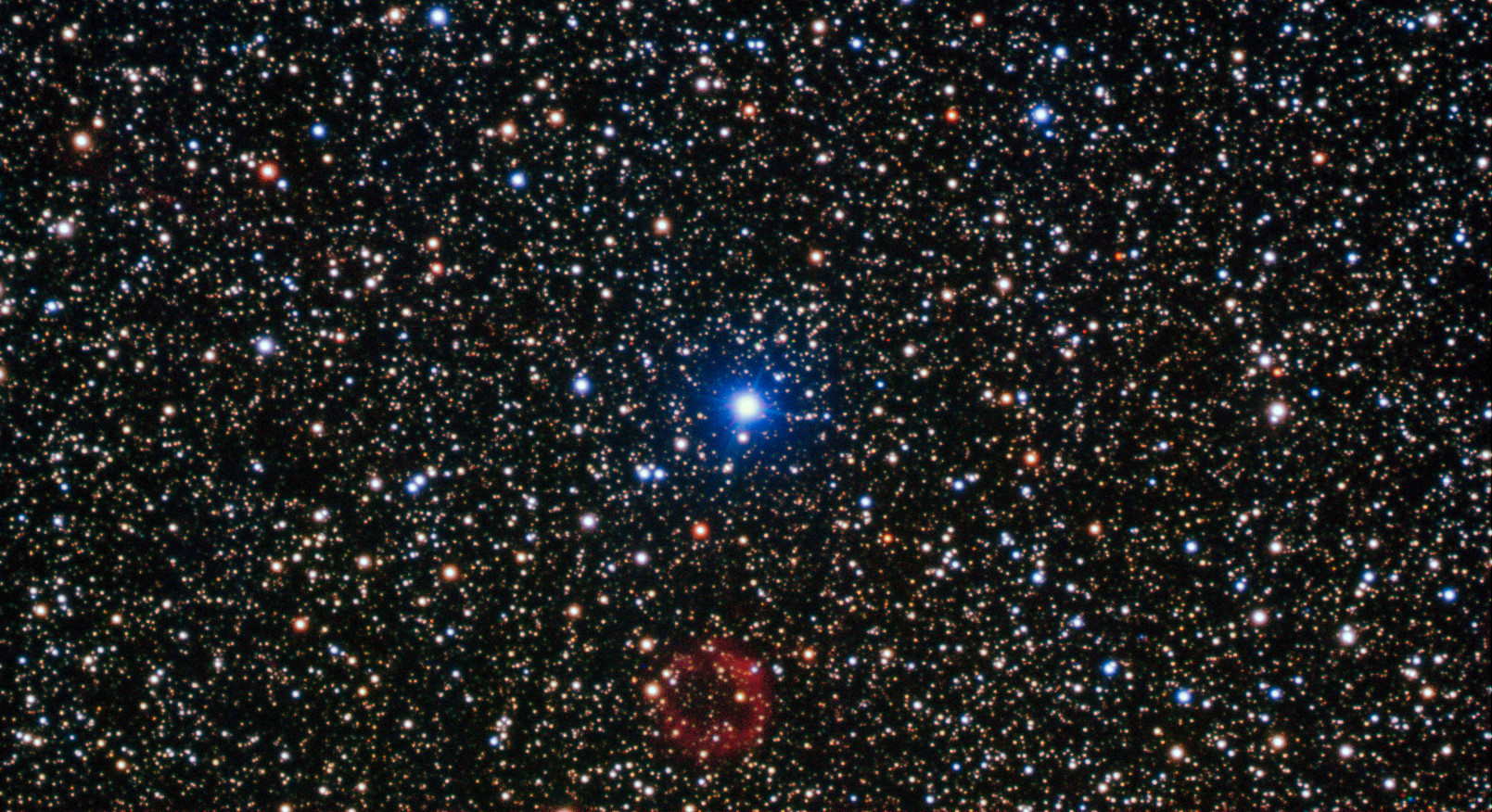
Sakurai's Object (bottom) is a white dwarf undergoing a helium shell flash.

During the red giant phase of stellar evolution in stars with less than 2.0 M_{☉}, the nuclear fusion of hydrogen ceases in the core as it is depleted, leaving a helium-rich core. Hydrogen fusion continues in a shell surrounding the core, which causes continued accumulation of helium in the core. This makes the core denser, but its temperature is still unable to reach the level required for helium fusion, as happens in more massive stars. Thus the thermal pressure from fusion is no longer sufficient to counter gravitational pressure and achieve the hydrostatic equilibrium found in most stars. This causes the star to start contracting and increasing in temperature until it eventually becomes compressed enough for the helium core to become degenerate matter. This degeneracy pressure is finally sufficient to stop further collapse of the most central material but the rest of the core continues to contract and the temperature continues to rise until it reaches ≈1×10^{8} K, at which point the helium can ignite and start to fuse.

The explosive nature of the helium flash arises from its taking place in degenerate matter. Once the temperature reaches 100–200 million kelvins and helium fusion begins using the triple-alpha process, the temperature rapidly increases, further raising the helium fusion rate and, because degenerate matter is a good conductor of heat, widening the reaction region. However, since degeneracy pressure (which is purely a function of density) is dominating thermal pressure (proportional to the product of density and temperature), the total pressure is only weakly dependent on temperature. Thus, the dramatic increase in temperature only causes a slight increase in pressure, so there is no stabilizing cooling expansion of the core.

This runaway reaction quickly climbs to about 100 billion times the star's normal energy production (for a few seconds) until the temperature increases to the point that thermal pressure again becomes dominant, eliminating the degeneracy. The core can then expand and cool down and a stable burning of helium will continue.

A star with mass greater than about 2.25 M_{☉} starts to burn helium before its core becomes degenerate, and so does not exhibit this type of helium flash. In a very low-mass star (less than about 0.5 M_{☉}), the core is never hot enough to ignite helium. The degenerate helium core will keep on contracting, and finally becomes a helium white dwarf.

The helium flash is not directly observable on the surface by electromagnetic radiation. The flash occurs in the core deep inside the star, and the net effect will be that all released energy is absorbed by the entire core, causing the degenerate state to become nondegenerate. Earlier computations indicated that a nondisruptive mass loss would be possible in some cases, but later star modeling taking neutrino energy loss into account indicates no such mass loss.

In a one solar mass star, the helium flash is estimated to release about 5×10^{41} J, or about 0.3% of the energy release of a 1.5×10^{44} J type Ia supernova, which is triggered by an analogous ignition of carbon fusion in a carbon–oxygen white dwarf.

== Binary white dwarfs ==
When hydrogen gas is accreted onto a white dwarf from a binary companion star, the hydrogen can fuse to form helium for a narrow range of accretion rates, but most systems develop a layer of hydrogen over the degenerate white dwarf interior. This hydrogen can build up to form a shell near the surface of the star. When the mass of hydrogen becomes sufficiently large, runaway fusion causes a nova. In a few binary systems where the hydrogen fuses on the surface, the mass of helium built up can burn in an unstable helium flash. In certain binary systems the companion star may have lost most of its hydrogen and donate helium-rich material to the compact star. Note that similar flashes occur on neutron stars.

== Helium shell flash ==
Helium shell flashes are a somewhat analogous but much less violent, nonrunaway helium ignition event, taking place in the absence of degenerate matter. They occur periodically in asymptotic giant branch stars in a shell outside the core. This is late in the life of a star in its giant phase. The star has burnt most of the helium available in the core, which is now composed of carbon and oxygen. Helium fusion continues in a thin shell around this core, but then turns off as helium becomes depleted. This allows hydrogen fusion to start in a layer above the helium layer. After enough additional helium accumulates, helium fusion is reignited, leading to a thermal pulse which eventually causes the star to expand and brighten temporarily (the pulse in luminosity is delayed because it takes a number of years for the energy from restarted helium fusion to reach the surface). Such pulses may last a few hundred years, and are thought to occur periodically every 10,000 to 100,000 years. After the flash, helium fusion continues at an exponentially decaying rate for about 40% of the cycle as the helium shell is consumed. Thermal pulses may cause a star to shed circumstellar shells of gas and dust.

== See also ==
- Carbon detonation – Runaway fusion in a white dwarf star
