= List of most common surnames in Asian countries =

This article contains lists of the most common surnames in some of the countries of Asia, including Taiwan and six transcontinental countries but excluding the Middle Eastern countries (except Israel and Turkey). Countries are arranged in alphabetical order.

== Armenia ==
Source: Armenia's Voter List

Rank	Name	Armenian	Root name
1	Grigoryan	Գրիգորյան	Grigor (Gregory)
2	Harutyunyan	Հարությունյան	Harutyun ("resurrection")
3	Sargsyan	Սարգսյան	Sargis (Sergius)
4	Hovhannisyan	Հովհաննիսյան	Hovhannes (John)
5	Khachatryan	Խաչատրյան	Khachatur ("given by cross")
6	Hakobyan	Հակոբյան	Hakob (Jacob)
7	Petrosyan	Պետրոսյան	Petros (Peter)
8	Vardanyan	Վարդանյան	Vardan
9	Gevorgyan	Գեւորգյան	Gevorg (George)
10	Karapetyan	Կարապետյան	Karapet ("forerunner")
11	Mkrtchyan	Մկրտչյան	Mkrtich ("baptist")
12	Ghazaryan	Ղազարյան	Ghazar (Lazarus)
13	Manukyan	Մանուկյան	Manuk ("child")
14	Avetisyan	Ավետիսյան	Avetis/Avetik ("good news")
15	Poghosyan	Պողոսյան	Poghos (Paul)
16	Martirosyan	Մարտիրոսյան	Martiros ("martyr")
17	Sahakyan	Սահակյան	Sahak (Isaac)
18	Arakelyan	Առաքելյան	Arakel ("apostle")
19	Margaryan	Մարգարյան	Margar
20	Davtyan	Դավթյան	Davit (David)

== Azerbaijan ==
Rank	Name	Romanization	Meaning
1	Məmmədov	Mammadov	"Son of Mammad"
2	Əliyev	Aliyev	"Son of Ali"
3	Hüseynov	Huseynov	"Son of Hüseyn"
4	Həsənov	Hasanov	"Son of Hasan"
5	Quliyev	Guliyev	"Son of Qulu"
6	İsmayılov	Ismayilov	"Son of Ismayil"
7	Əhmədov	Ahmadov	"Son of Ahmad"
8	Abdullayev	Abdullayev	"Son of Abdulla"
9	Abbasov	Abbasov	"Son of Abbas"
10	Cəfərov	Jafarov	"Son of Jafar"

== Bangladesh ==
Rank	Name	Romanization	Meaning
1	আক্তার	Akter	Star
2	ইসলাম	Islam	Submission
3	খাতুন	Khatun	Noblewoman
4	হোসেন	Hossain	Handsome
5	রহমান	Rahman	Gracious
6	আহম্মেদ	Ahmed	

== Cambodia ==
Khmer	IPA	Romanization	Origin
កូយ		Kuy	
កឹម		Kem	
កែប		Kep	
កែវ	kaew	Keo	(2nd most popular surname in Cambodia) meaning glass or jewel or crystal
ខាត់	kʰat	Khat	Chinese
ខាយ	kʰaːy	Khay	凱/凯 (triumphant, victorious)
ខៀវ	kʰiəw	Khiev	喬/乔 (Chinese "qiao", Vietnamese "kiều")
ខ្លូត	kʰlout	Khlot	generic name for melon-like fruit
គឹម	kɨm	Kim	金 (Korean "Kim" / Mandarin Chinese "Jin", meaning gold)
គួច		Kouch	
កាំង		Kaing	
ឃាង		Kheang	
ឃិន		Khin	Chinese 欽/钦 (respect, admiration)
ឃីម		Khim	
ចន្ទ		Chan/Chhan/Jan	Sanskrit word Candra (चन्द्र) meaning moon
ចាន់		Chan	
ចាប		Chap	Bird
ចេង		Cheng	
ចេន	ceːn	Chen/Jen	陳 (Given only to Cambodians of Chinese descent)
ឆន	cʰɑːn	Chhorn	終/终; whole, complete, entire.
ឆាយ			
ជា	ciə	Chea	谢 (Chinese Xie)
ជាម	ciəm	Cheam	bowl. From Persian جام (jam) meaning "cup". Or could be from Chinese 詹 (zhan) meaning "talk too much."
ជិន	cin	Chin/Jin	
ជឹម	cɨm	Chim/Choem	
ជ័យ	cɨj	Chey/Jey/Jay	Most popular surname in Cambodia, the Cambodian word "chey" meaning "victory" or "victorious", derived from Sanskrit jaya (जय)
ឈិត	cʰit	Chhet/Chhit	奇 (odd, unusual)
ឈិន			陳/陈 (old)
ឈឹម	cʰəm	Chhim/Chhem	欽 (respect, admiration)
ញឹក	ɲɨk	Nhek	abbreviation of 涅槃 (Nirvana)
ដួង	duəŋ	Duong	beloved, dear, darling
ឌិត	dɨt	Dith	ḍita from Sanskrit Paṇḍita (पण्डित) meaning wise man or scholar; or Chinese 狄 ("Di")
ឌិន	dɨn	Din	from ḍina (डिन) in Pali meaning flight
ឌី		Dy	
ឌុល	dul	Dul	from ḍula (डुल) in Pali meaning earring or tremble
ឌួង	duəŋ	Duong	Chinese 東/东 (east)
តក់		Tok	Droplets of water
តាង	taːŋ	Tang	唐
តាត	taːt	Tat	達/达 (attain)
តូច	touc ~ tuːc	Toch/Touch	small
តាំង	taŋ	Taing	Possibly from Chinese 凳 meaning "bench" or "chair".
ថន		Than	
ទាវ		Teav	
ទី	tiː	Ty	
ទុំ		Tum	
ទ្រី		Try	
ទេព	teːp	Tep	from Deva (देव), Sanskrit for god or divine
ធី	tʰiː	Thy	
នី		Ny	
ប្រាក់		Prak	Khmer for silver
ប៉ាង	paːŋ	Pang	龐/庞 (vast)
ប៉ុក	pok	Pok	波 (Bo)
ប៊ុន	bun	Bun	本 (the four winds, from Vietnamese bốn)
ប៉ែន	paen	Pen/Ben	賓/宾 (guest/visitor)
ផាន	pʰaːn	Phan	潘 (to overflow; be abundant)
ពិជ		Pech	
ពេជ្រ		Pich	means Diamonds in Cambodia
ភី	pʰiː	Phy	guardian, one of great importance
មា	maː	Ma	ม้า (Thai version of Chinese "Ma")
មាន	miən	Mean	rich or wealthy; or 緬/缅 (nostalgic, distant)
មាស	miəh	Meas	Khmer for gold
មួយ	muəy	Muy/Muoy	the number 1
មូល	muːl	Mul	round
មេង	meːŋ	Meng	孟 (Chinese "Meng")
ម៉ៅ	maʋ	Mao	毛 (Chinese "Mao"), locals argue that it came from a spoken form of the Khmer word black or kmav (ខ្មៅ). However this word is reconstructed from Proto-Austro-Asiatic as *kVm and thus is unlikely to be so.
យស់	yuəh	Yos/Yous	
យុន	yun	Yun	尹 (Chinese "Yun")
យូ	yuː	Yu	尤 (Chinese "Yu")
រស់	rʊəh	Ros/Rous	to live
រួយ		Rouy	
លិម	lim	Lim	林 (Chinese "Lin", meaning forest)
លី		Ly	
លីវ		Liv	
លឹម		Lim	
វ៉ាង	ʋaaŋ	Vang	
វង្ស	ʋʊəŋ	Vong	Circle, line of descent. Derived from the Sanskrit word vaṃśa (वंश) meaning lineage.
ស	sɑː	Sor/Sar	White
សង	sɑːŋ	Sang	Payback
សម	sɑːm	Sam	
សរ	sɑː	Sor/Sar	
សាង	saːŋ	Sang	常 (Variation of Chinese "Chang")
សាត	saːt	Sat	
សាន	saːn	San	
សាយ	saːj	Say	
សិន	sɨn	Sin	森; (Forest)
សឺន	səɨn	Son	
សុខ	sok	Sok	from Sanskrit Sukha (सुख) meaning joy or happiness
សុង	soŋ	Song	
សុន	son	Son	
ស៊ុយ	suy	Suy	隋 (Sui Dynasty)
សូ	soː	So	蘇/苏 (Chinese "Sū")
ស៊ូ	suː	Su	蘇/苏 (Chinese "Sū")
សួន	suən	Soun	Garden
សឿង		Seoung	
សៀង	sieŋ	Sieng/Seang	Soy or Shang (From Shang Hai City)
សេង	seiŋ	Seng	常 (Variation of Chinese "Chang"). Or from Chinese 乘 (seng) meaning "to multiply"
សេន	sein	Sen	Cent
សោម	saom	Som	from Sanskrit soma (सोम) meaning moon or sky
សៅ		Sao	
ហាក៉		Hak	
ហុង	hoŋ	Hong	from Chinese 洪 "Hong" meaning water or flood listed 184th among the Song-era Hundred Family Surnames
ហ៊ុន	hun	Hun	money investment, share (of stocks). Thai or Chinese etymology. Possibly related to 份 ("Hun" in Hokkien) meaning "share, portion."
ហូ	hou	Ho/Hu	胡 (Chinese "Hu")
ឡាយ		Lay	來/来 (Chinese "Lai", meaning Come)
ឡុង	loŋ	Long	龍/龙 (Chinese "Long", meaning dragon)
អាង	aːŋ	Ang/Aang	吳/吴 (Cantonese variation of surname "Wu")
អិម	ʔim	Im/Yim	任 (Hakka Chinese 'jim5')
អុង	ʔoŋ	Ong	王 (Chinese "Wang" (pronounced Ong in Hokkien dialect), meaning king)
អ៊ុច	ʔuc	Uch/Ouch	To Light
អ៊ុយ	ʔuj	Uy	
អៀម	ʔiəm	Eam/Iem/Iam	
អៀវ	ʔieʋ	Iv/Eav/Eaw	楊/杨 (Chinese "Yang")
អ៊ុំ	ʔum	Um	Aunt (A parent's older brother or sister)
ឯក	ʔaek	Ek/Aek	Self, Single; from Sanskrit eka (एक)
ឱក	ʔaok	Ok/Aok	玉 (Jade)
ឱម	ʔaom	Om	嚴/严 (Chinese "Yan")

== China ==
According to a report released by the Ministry of Public Security in January 2019, there are 6,150 different surnames in China with the top 100 surnames used by 85% of the population in 2018.

Rank	Name		Romanization	Total number in China (2018)
Rank	Simp.	Trad.	Romanization	Total number in China (2018)
1	王		Wáng (Note: Most common surname in the world.)/Wong	101,500,000
2	李		Lǐ (Note: 2nd most common surname in the world.)/Lee	100,900,000
3	张	張	Zhāng (Note: 3rd most common surname in the world.)/Cheung	95,400,000
4	刘	劉	Liú (Note: 5th most common surname in the world.)/Lau	72,100,000
5	陈	陳	Chén (Note: 4th most common in world (most popular Chinese surname in Hong Kong, Macao, Singapore, Southeast Asia, Taiwan, Vietnam, and places outside Mainland China))/ Chan	63,000,000
6	杨	楊	Yáng (Note: 7th most common surname in the world.) /Yeung	46,200,000
7	黄	黃	Huáng/Wong	33,700,000
8	赵	趙	Zhào/Chiu	28,600,000
9	吴	吳	Wú (Note: 9th most common surname in the world.)/Ng	27,800,000
10	周		Zhōu/Chow	26,800,000
11	徐		Xú (Note: 10th most common surname in the world.) /Tsui	20,200,000
12	孙	孫	Sūn/Suen	19,400,000
13	马	馬	Mǎ/Ma	19,100,000
14	朱		Zhū/Chu	18,100,000
15	胡		Hú/Wu	16,500,000
16	郭		Guō/Kwok	15,800,000
17	何		Hé/Ho	14,800,000
18	林		Lín/Lam	14,200,000
19	高		Gāo/Ko	14,100,000
20	罗	羅	Luó/Law	14,000,000

== Georgia ==
Rank	Name	Romanization	Total Number (2010)
1	ბერიძე	Beridze	24,962
2	მამედოვი	Mamedov; Mamedovi	23,675
3	კაპანაძე	Kapanadze	17,202
4	გელაშვილი	Gelashvili	16,350
5	ალიევი	Aliyev; Alievi	15,742
6	მაისურაძე	Maisuradze	14,824
7	გიორგაძე	Giorgadze	12,954
8	ლომიძე	Lomidze	11,796
9	წიკლაური	Tsiklauri	11,571
10	ბოლქვაძე	Bolkvadze	10,916
11	კვარაცხელია	Kvaratskhelia	10,447
12	ნოზაძე	Nozadze	10,183
13	ხუციშვილი	Khutsishvili	10,075
14	შენგელია	Shengelia	9,928
15	აბულაძე	Abuladze	9,663
16	მიქელაძე	Mikeladze	9,220
17	ტაბატაძე	Tabatadze	8,654
18	მჭედლიშვილი	Mchedlishvili	8,446
19	ბაირამოვი	Bairamov; Bairamovi	8,373
20	გოგოლაძე	Gogoladze	8,362

== India ==
Rank	Name	Meaning	Total number (2014)
1	Devi	Goddess	70,362,192
2	Singh	Lion	34,838,027
3	Kumar	Prince	31,111,248
4	Das	Servant	11,368,810
5	Kaur	Princess	9,480,229
6	Ram		7,228,601
7	Yadav	Name of a non-aryan cattleman caste	6,993,402
8	Kumari		6,615,155
9	Lal	Darling, epithet of Krishna, or red	5,669,679
10	Bai		5,339,803

== Indonesia ==
Most Indonesians, particularly from the western parts, do not use family names. Only some ethnic groups maintain family names, such as Bataks, Nias, Mentawai, some Dayaks, and most ethnic groups in eastern Indonesia (except in Bali, West Nusa Tenggara, and some groups in Sulawesi, such as the Butonese).

== Israel ==
Rank	Name	Romanization	Meaning	Frequency
1	כהן	Cohen	"priest"	1.93%
2	לוי	Levi; Levy	"Levite"	1.12%
3	מזרחי	Mizrachi; Mizrahi	"easterner"	0.33%
4	פרץ	Peretz	Perez also from Pérez	0.32%
5	ביטון	Biton	from Chaim "life"	0.30%
6	דהן	Dahan	"oil merchant"	0.23%
7	אברהם	Avraham	Abraham	0.22%
8	פרידמן	Friedman	"Man of peace"	0.21%
9	מלכה	Malka; Malcah	"queen"	0.19%
10	אזולאי	Azoulay	"of a priestly dynasty" "blue eyed"	0.19%
11	כץ	Katz	"priest of righteousness" "priest of Zadok"	0.19%
12	יוסף	Yosef	Joseph	0.18%
13	דוד	David	David from Davidson & al.	0.17%
14	עמר	Amar; Omer	"farmer" "sheaf"	0.17%
15	אוחיון	Ohayon; Ochion	"son of Chaim"	0.16%

Rank	Name	Romanization	Meaning	Frequency
16	חדד	Hadad; Chadad	"smith"	0.16%
17	גבאי	Gabai	synagogue warden; sexton	0.16%
18	בן דוד	Ben-David	"son of David"	0.14%
19	אדרי	Edry/Edri; Adary	from Draa valley in Morocco	0.14%
20	לוין	Levin	"Levite"	0.14%
21	טל	Tal	"dew"	0.13%
22	קליין	Klein	"small"	0.13%
23	חן	Chen; Khen	"loveliness" "grace"	0.13%
24	שפירא	Shapira	"Speyerer"	0.13%
25	חזן	Chazan; Hazan	"cantor"	0.13%
26	משה	Moshe	Moses	0.13%
27	אשכנזי	Ashkenazi	"German"	0.12%
28	אוחנה	Ohana	"Son of Hannah"	0.12%
29	סגל	Segal; Segel	"assistant to the Levites" (S'gan Levi)	0.12%
30	גולן	Golan		0.12%

== Japan ==
Rank	Name		2008 estimates	
Rank	Kanji	Romaji	Numbers	%
1	佐藤	Satō	1,990,000	1.57
2	鈴木	Suzuki	1,900,000	1.50
3	高橋	Takahashi	1,470,000	1.16
4	田中	Tanaka	1,340,000	1.06
5	渡辺	Watanabe	1,200,000	0.95
6	伊藤	Itō	1,150,000	0.91
7	中村	Nakamura	1,080,000	0.85
8	小林	Kobayashi	1,060,000	0.84
9	山本	Yamamoto	1,020,000	0.81
10	加藤	Katō	920,000	0.73
11	吉田	Yoshida	850,000	—
12	山田	Yamada	820,000	—
13	佐々木	Sasaki	710,000	—
14	山口	Yamaguchi	640,000	—
15	松本	Matsumoto	630,000	—
16	井上	Inoue	600,000	—
17	木村	Kimura	580,000	—
18	清水	Shimizu	560,000	—
19	林	Hayashi	550,000	—
20	斉藤	Saitō	530,000	—
21	斎藤	Saitō	520,000	—
22	山崎	Yamazaki; Yamasaki	490,000	—
23	中島	Nakajima; Nakashima	480,000	—
24	森	Mori	470,000	—
25	阿部	Abe	470,000	—
26	池田	Ikeda	450,000	—
27	橋本	Hashimoto	450,000	—
28	石川	Ishikawa	440,000	—
29	山下	Yamashita	410,000	—
30	小川	Ogawa	410,000	—
31	石井	Ishii	400,000	—
32	長谷川	Hasegawa	390,000	—
33	後藤	Gotō	390,000	—
34	岡田	Okada	380,000	—
35	近藤	Kondō	370,000	—
36	前田	Maeda	370,000	—
37	藤田	Fujita	370,000	—
38	遠藤	Endō	360,000	—
39	青木	Aoki	350,000	—
40	坂本	Sakamoto	350,000	—
41	村上	Murakami	340,000	—
42	太田	Ōta	320,000	—
43	金子	Kaneko	310,000	—
44	藤井	Fujii	310,000	—
45	福田	Fukuda	300,000	—
46	西村	Nishimura	300,000	—
47	三浦	Miura	300,000	—
48	竹内	Takeuchi	290,000	—
49	中川	Nakagawa	290,000	—
50	岡本	Okamoto	290,000	—
51	松田	Matsuda	290,000	—
52	原田	Harada	290,000	—
53	中野	Nakano	290,000	—
54	小野	Ono	280,000	—
55	田村	Tamura	280,000	—
56	藤原	Fujiwara; Fujihara	270,000	—
57	中山	Nakayama	270,000	—
58	石田	Ishida	270,000	—
59	小島	Kojima	260,000	—
60	和田	Wada	260,000	—
61	森田	Morita	250,000	—
62	内田	Uchida	250,000	—
63	柴田	Shibata	250,000	—
64	酒井	Sakai	240,000	—
65	原	Hara	240,000	—
66	高木	Takagi; Takaki	240,000	—
67	横山	Yokoyama	240,000	—
68	安藤	Andō	240,000	—
69	宮崎	Miyazaki; Miyasaki	240,000	—
70	上田	Ueda; Ueta	240,000	—
71	島田	Shimada	230,000	—
72	工藤	Kudō	230,000	—
73	大野	Ōno	220,000	—
74	宮本	Miyamoto	220,000	—
75	杉山	Sugiyama	220,000	—
76	今井	Imai	220,000	—
77	丸山	Maruyama	210,000	—
78	増田	Masuda	210,000	—
79	高田	Takada; Takata	210,000	—
80	村田	Murata	210,000	—
81	平野	Hirano	210,000	—
82	大塚	Ōtsuka	210,000	—
83	菅原	Sugawara; Sugahara	210,000	—
84	武田	Takeda; Taketa	200,000	—
85	新井	Arai	200,000	—
86	小山	Koyama; Oyama	200,000	—
87	野口	Noguchi	200,000	—
88	桜井	Sakurai	200,000	—
89	千葉	Chiba	200,000	—
90	岩崎	Iwasaki	200,000	—
91	佐野	Sano	200,000	—
92	谷口	Taniguchi	200,000	—
93	上野	Ueno	200,000	—
94	松井	Matsui	190,000	—
95	河野	Kōno; Kawano	190,000	—
96	市川	Ichikawa	190,000	—
97	渡部	Watanabe; Watabe	190,000	—
98	野村	Nomura	180,000	—
99	菊地	Kikuchi	180,000	—
100	木下	Kinoshita	180,000	—

== Kazakhstan ==
Provided here is a list of the 33 most common surnames in Kazakhstan according to the Ministry of Justice of Kazakhstan as of 2014.

- List of the most popular surnames of Kazakhs of Kazakhstan

Rank	Cyrillic script	Latin script	Language (and meaning)	Occurrence
1	Ахметов	Ahmetov	Kazakh, "son of Ahmet"	73,627
2	Омаров	Omarov	Kazakh, "son of Omar"	45,123
3	Ким	Kim	Korean	42,274
4	Оспанов	Ospanov	Kazakh	41,068
5	Иванов	Ivanov	Russian, "son of Ivan"	39,296
6	Алиев	Aliev	Kazakh, "son of Ali"	36,084
7	Сулейменов	Suleimenov	Kazakh, "son of Suleimen"	33,940
8	Искаков	Iskakov	Kazakh, "son of Iskak"	31,988
9	Абдрахманов	Abdrahmanov	Kazakh, "son of Abdrahman"	29,091
10	Ибрагимов	Ibragimov	Kazakh, "son of Ibragim"	28,755
11	Калиев	Kaliev	Kazakh, "son of Kali"	28,219
12	Садыков	Sadykov	Kazakh, "son of Sadyk"	27,810
13	Ибраев	Ibraev	Kazakh	26,531
14	Кузнецов	Kuznetsov	Russian, "son of a blacksmith"	25,990
15	Попов	Popov	Russian, "son of a priest"	24,956
16	Смагулов	Smagulov	Kazakh, "son of Smagul"	24,005
17	Абдуллаев	Abdullaev	Kazakh, "son of Abdulla"	23,729
18	Исаев	Isaev	Kazakh, "son of Isa"	22,910
19	Султанов	Sultanov	Kazakh, "son of Sultan"	22,808
22	Юсупов	Iusupov	Uzbek, "son of Yusup"	22,763
21	Исмаилов	Ismailov	Kazakh, "son of Ismail"	21,392
22	Нургалиев	Nurgaliev	Kazakh, "son of Nurgali"	21,133
23	Каримов	Karimov	Kazakh, "son of Karim"	20,575
24	Серік/Серик	Serik	Kazakh,	19,550
25	Ли	Li	Korean	17,049
26	Цой	Tsoi	Korean	12,088
27	Амангельды	Amangeldy	Kazakh	15,125
28	Болат	Bolat	Kazakh	11,234
29	Бондаренко	Bondarenko	Ukrainian	10,648
30	Марат	Marat	Kazakh, "Murad"	10,417
31	Серікбай/Серикбай	Serıkbay/Serikbay	Kazakh	10,193
32	Мұрат/Мурат	Murat	Kazakh, "Murad"	10,106
33	Кусаинов	Kusainov	Kazakh, "son of Kusain"	10,103

== Korea ==
Rank (2015)	Hangul	Hanja	Romanizations
1	김	金	Kim, Gim, Ghim
2	리 / 이	李	Lee, Yi, Rhee
3	박	朴	Park, Pak, Bak
4	최	崔	Choi, Choe, Choy, Joy
5	정	鄭	Jung, Jeong, Chung, Cheong, Young
6	강	姜	Kang, Gang, Ghang
7	조	趙	Cho, Jo, Joe
8	윤	尹	Yoon, Yun, Youn
9	장	張	Jang, Chang
10	림 / 임	林	Lim, Rim, Im, Rhim
11	한	韓	Han
12	오	吳	Oh, O
13	서	徐	Seo, Suh, Seoh
14	신	申	Shin, Sin
15	권	權	Kwon, Gwon, Kuen
16	황	黃	Hwang, Huang
17	안	安	Ahn, An
18	송	宋	Song
19	류 / 유	柳	Yoo, Yu, Ryu, Ryoo
20	전	全	Jeon, Jun, Chun, Cheon
21	홍	洪	Hong
22	고	高	Ko, Koh, Go, Goh
23	문	文	Moon, Mun, Mon, Munn
24	량 / 양	梁	Yang, Ryang
25	손	孫	Son, Sohn, Sonn

Rank (2000)	Hangul	Hanja	Romanizations
26	배	裵	Bae, Bai, Pai, Pae
27	조	曺	Cho, Jo
28	백	白	Baek, Paik, Pak, Bak, Bhak, Phak
29	허	許	Hur, Heo, Her, Hui
30	류 / 유	劉	Yoo, Yu
31	남	南	Nam, Nan, Nham
32	심	沈	Sim, Shim, Shen
33	로 / 노	盧	No, Noh, Roh
34	정	丁	Jung, Jeong
35	하	河	Ha, Hah
36	곽	郭	Kwak, Gwak, Koak
37	성	成	Seong, Sung, Shong, Shung
38	차	車	Cha
39	주	朱	Ju, Joo, Chu, Zhu, Zuu, Juu, Choo
40	우	禹	Woo, U
41	구	具	Gu, Koo, Goo
42	신	辛	Shin, Sheen, Sin
43	임	任	Im, Yim
44	라 / 나	羅	Na, Ra, La
45	전	田	Jeon, Jun
46	민	閔	Min
47	유	兪	Yoo, Yu
48	진	陳	Jin, Jean, Chen, Jen
49	지	池	Ji, Jee
50	엄	嚴	Eom, Uhm, Um

== Malaysia ==
Most Malaysians do not use a family last name. There is only a small number of ethnic groups which maintain family names, such as the Malaysian Chinese, Eurasian and some Malaysian Indian and East Malaysian natives.

== Nepal ==
Surnames in Nepal are divided into three origins; Indo-Aryan languages, Tibeto-Burman languages and indigenous origins. Indo-Aryan surnames are more prevalent than Tibeto-Burman Languages and Indigenous Origins surnames.

1. Rai - Common Surnames of Nepalese/Himalayan Indigenous Nations/Natives.

2. Rai Clans/Septs (Confederation) - Bantawa, Chamling, Kulung, Mewahang, Bahing, Lohorung, Puma, Dumi, Dungmali, Nachhiring, Lingkhim/Lungkhim, Chhiling/Chhulung, Mugali/Lambichong, Athpahariya, Thulung, Khaling, Mewahang, Bayung, Yamphu, Tilung, Sampang, Wambule, Dewas, Jerung/Jero, Waling and Phangduwali.

3. Chamling La-Chamling Language-Rodung as Rai

5. Meaning of Rai - King

== Pakistan ==
1. Khan - as of 2014 there were 23 million Khans worldwide predominantly in Asia

== Philippines ==
Due to the 333 years of Spanish colonization of the Philippines, most Filipinos bear surnames of Spanish or other Iberian origin. Provided here is the list of the fifty most common Filipino surnames:

Rank	Name	Language of origin	Occurrence (2014 est.)	Ratio of population	Provinces with highest concentration
1	dela Cruz	Spanish	625,640	1:162	Metro Manila, Bulacan, Nueva Ecija, Pangasinan, Pampanga, Cavite, Rizal, Tarlac, Isabela
2	Garcia	Spanish	441,075	1:230	Pampanga, Metro Manila, Bulacan, Batangas, Nueva Ecija, Cavite, Laguna, Rizal, Tarlac, Quezon
3	Reyes	Spanish	412,750	1:245	Metro Manila, Bulacan, Cavite, Pampanga, Laguna, Batangas, Nueva Ecija, Rizal, Pangasinan, Quezon, Bataan, Tarlac
4	Ramos	Spanish	375,999	1:268	Metro Manila, Bulacan, Nueva Ecija, Pangasinan, Cavite, Batangas, Laguna, Rizal, Isabela, Pampanga, Tarlac, Quezon, Cagayan, Ilocos Norte
5	Mendoza	Spanish	372,042	1:272	Metro Manila, Batangas, Bulacan, Cavite, Laguna, Pampanga, Quezon, Pangasinan, Nueva Ecija, Rizal, Tarlac, Oriental Mindoro
6	Santos	Spanish	342,746	1:295	Metro Manila, Bulacan, Pampanga, Nueva Ecija, Rizal, Cavite, Tarlac
7	Flores	Spanish	312,187	1:324	Metro Manila, Cebu, Negros Oriental, Pampanga, Bulacan, Laguna, Pangasinan
8	Gonzales	Spanish	293,787	1:345	Metro Manila, Bulacan, Batangas, Cavite, Pampanga, Laguna, Nueva Ecija, Iloilo, Negros Occidental, Rizal Pangasinan, Quezon
9	Bautista	Spanish	287,625	1:352	Metro Manila, Pangasinan, Bulacan, Cavite, Batangas, Nueva Ecija, Pampanga, Laguna, Rizal, Tarlac, Isabela
10	Villanueva	Spanish	277,730	1:365	Metro Manila, Batangas, Cavite, Negros Occidental, Laguna, Bulacan, Pangasinan, Iloilo, Rizal, Quezon, Nueva Ecija
11	Fernandez	Spanish	269,820	1:375	Metro Manila, Pangasinan, Cebu, Negros Occidental
12	Cruz	Spanish	262,822	1:378	Metro Manila, Bulacan, Rizal, Pampanga, Pangasinan, Cavite, Bataan, Nueva Ecija
13	de Guzman	Spanish	249,319	1:406	Metro Manila, Pangasinan, Bulacan, Nueva Ecija, Pampanga, Cavite, Rizal, Batangas, Laguna, Tarlac, Bataan, Isabela
14	Lopez	Spanish	230,958	1:438	Metro Manila, Bulacan, Pangasinan, Pampanga, Cavite, Batangas
15	Perez	Spanish	220,113	1:460	Metro Manila, Batangas, Bulacan, Pangasinan, Laguna, Cavite, Rizal
16	Castillo	Spanish	211,405	1:479	Metro Manila, Batangas, Laguna, Bulacan, Pangasinan, Cavite, Nueva Ecija, Quezon, Isabela
17	Francisco	Spanish	207,840	1:487	Metro Manila, Bulacan, Rizal, Zamboanga del Sur, Cavite, Nueva Ecija, Negros Occidental, Masbate, Antique, Camarines Sur, Aklan
18	Rivera	Spanish	184,543	1:549	Metro Manila, Pampanga, Bulacan, Nueva Ecija, Rizal, Laguna, Cavite
19	Aquino	Spanish	183,088	1:553	Pangasinan, Metro Manila, Laguna, Pampanga, Bulacan, Nueva Ecija, Rizal, Cavite, Tarlac, Batangas, Isabela
20	Castro	Spanish	173,686	1:587	Metro Manila, Pampanga, Pangasinan, Bulacan, Nueva Ecija, Tarlac
21	Sanchez	Spanish	162,886	1:622	Metro Manila, Cebu, Pampanga, Bulacan, Pangasinan, Laguna, Cavite, Batangas, Davao del Sur
22	Torres	Spanish	162,353	1:624	Metro Manila, Pampanga, Bulacan, Negros Oriental, Cavite, Laguna, Nueva Ecija, Rizal, Tarlac, Batangas
23	de Leon	Spanish	156,637	1:647	Metro Manila, Bulacan, Pampanga, Rizal, Nueva Ecija, Cavite, Laguna, Pangasinan, Batangas, Bataan, Tarlac, Quezon, Isabela
24	Domingo	Spanish	147,652	1:687	Metro Manila, Nueva Ecija, Isabela, Bulacan, Cagayan, Tarlac, Ilocos, Pangasinan, Rizal
25	Martinez	Spanish	143,359	1:706	Metro Manila, Cavite, Pangasinan, Rizal, Batangas, Laguna, Bulacan, Quezon
26	Rodriguez	Spanish	143,072	1:708	Metro Manila, Cavite, Batangas, Bulacan, Negros Oriental, Camarines Sur, Laguna, Rizal, Pampanga
27	Santiago	Spanish	140,475	1:721	Metro Manila, Bulacan, Nueva Ecija, Pampanga, Cavite, Rizal, Isabela, Tarlac
28	Soriano	Spanish	140,203	1:722	Pangasinan, Metro Manila, Isabela, Cagayan, Pampanga, Nueva Ecija, Cavite, Rizal, Bulacan, La Union, Laguna, Tarlac, Benguet
29	delos Santos	Spanish	139,229	1:727	Metro Manila, Bulacan, Pangasinan, Camarines Sur, Cavite, Laguna, Rizal, Nueva Ecija, Zamboanga del Sur, Quezon, Camarines Norte
30	Diaz	Spanish	136,449	1:742	Metro Manila, Pangasinan, Cavite, Bulacan, Iloilo, Nueva Ecija, Negros Occidental, Rizal, Laguna
31	Hernandez	Spanish	135,744	1:746	Batangas, Metro Manila, Cavite, Bulacan, Laguna, Quezon, Pampanga, Oriental Mindoro, Rizal, Camarines Sur, Nueva Ecija, Camarines Norte, Bataan
32	Tolentino	Spanish	133,010	1:752	Metro Manila, Pampanga, Bulacan, Batangas, Nueva Ecija, Laguna, Cavite, Tarlac, Rizal, Isabela, Bataan
33	Valdez	Spanish	132,416	1:765	Metro Manila, Pangasinan, Nueva Ecija, Isabela, Tarlac, La Union, Ilocos Sur, Rizal
34	Ramirez	Spanish	131,829	1:768	Metro Manila, Batangas, Cavite, Pangasinan, Bulacan, Laguna, Negros Oriental, Rizal
35	Morales	Spanish	129,957	1:779	Metro Manila, Pampanga, Cavite, Bulacan, Negros Occidental, Batangas
36	Mercado	Spanish	125,314	1:808	Metro Manila, Batangas, Pampanga, Laguna, Bulacan, Cavite, Quezon, Tarlac, Nueva Ecija, Pampanga
37	Tan	Chinese (Hokkien) or Tausug	123,290	1:821	Metro Manila, Cebu, Davao del Sur
38	Aguilar	Spanish	121,635	1:832	Metro Manila, Iloilo, Cavite, Nueva Ecija, Bulacan, Laguna, Pampanga, Quezon, Negros Occidental
39	Navarro	Spanish	113,992	1:888	Metro Manila, Pangasinan, Cebu, Pampanga, Bulacan
40	Manalo	Tagalog	111,336	1:909	Batangas, Metro Manila, Pampanga, Quezon, Laguna, Cavite, Oriental Mindoro, Tarlac
41	Gomez	Spanish	108,844	1:930	Metro Manila, Pampanga, Cebu, Tarlac, Batangas, Cavite
42	Dizon	Chinese (Hokkien)	106,507	1:951	Pampanga, Metro Manila, Tarlac, Bulacan, Nueva Ecija, Pangasinan, Laguna
43	del Rosario	Spanish	105,210	1:962	Metro Manila, Bulacan, Cavite, Nueva Ecija, Rizal, Pampanga, Laguna, Isabela, Tarlac
44	Javier	Spanish	104,515	1:969	Metro Manila, Laguna, Cavite, Batangas, Bulacan, Nueva Ecija, Rizal, Pangasinan, Cagayan, Quezon
45	Corpuz	Spanish	104,026	1:973	Metro Manila, Pangasinan, Nueva Ecija, Isabela, Tarlac, Cagayan, Ilocos Norte, La Union
46	Gutierrez	Spanish	103,352	1:980	Metro Manila, Batangas, Pampanga, Bulacan, Pangasinan, Cavite, Rizal, Laguna, Rizal, Tarlac, Quezon, Oriental Mindoro Nueva Ecija
47	Salvador	Spanish	103,117	1:982	Metro Manila, Laguna, Bulacan, Isabela, Nueva Ecija, Pampanga, Pangasinan, Rizal
48	Velasco	Spanish	101,375	1:999	Metro Manila, Pangasinan, Laguna, Cavite, Camarines Sur, Bulacan, Nueva Ecija, Rizal, Pampanga, Isabela, Batangas, Quezon, Tarlac
49	Miranda	Spanish	101,258	1:1000	Metro Manila, Pampanga, Nueva Ecija, Cavite, Bulacan, Laguna, Rizal, Pangasinan, Batangas, Tarlac, Albay
50	David	Spanish	100,641	1:1006	Pampanga, Metro Manila, Tarlac, Bulacan

== Russia ==
See also: Список общерусских фамилий (in Russian Wikipedia)

The most common surnames in Russia, as calculated by Yumaguzin and Vinnik (2019):

Rank	Surname	Transliteration	Meaning	Percentage
1	Ивано́в/Ивано́ва	Ivanov/Ivanova	descendant of Ivan (John)	0.64275
2	Кузнецо́в/Кузнецо́ва	Kuznetsov/Kuznetsova	smith's	0.35634
3	Смирно́в/Смирно́ва	Smirnov/Smirnova	descendant of Smirnoy (meek one)	0.31630
4	Попо́в/Попо́ва	Popov/Popova	priest's descendant	0.31260
5	Петро́в/Петро́ва	Petrov/Petrova	descendant of Pyotr (Peter)	0.30807
6	Васи́льев/Васи́льева	Vasilyev/Vasilyeva	descendant of Vasily (Basil)	0.26549
7	Магоме́дов/Магоме́дова	Magomedov/Magomedova	descendant of Magomed (Muhammad)	0.23628
8	Али́ев/Али́ева	Aliyev/Aliyeva	descendant of Ali	0.22763
9	Кари́мов/Кари́мова	Karimov/Karimova	descendant of Karim	0.19051
10	Во́лков/Во́лкова	Volkov/Volkova	wolf's	0.18828
11	Семёнов/Семёнова	Semyonov/Semyonova	descendant of Semyon (Simon)	0.18682
12	Миха́йлов/Миха́йлова	Mikhaylov/Mikhaylova	descendant of Mikhail (Michael)	0.18355
13	Па́влов/Па́влова	Pavlov/Pavlova	descendant of Pavel (Paul)	0.18256
14	Козло́в/Козло́ва	Kozlov/Kozlova	he-goat's; metaphorically: bearded one	0.18177
15	Фёдоров/Фёдорова	Fyodorov/Fyodorova	descendant of Fyodor (Theodore)	0.17727
16	Но́виков/Но́викова	Novikov/Novikova	new man's/woman's; see novik for historical details	0.17388
17	Ибраги́мов/Ибраги́мова	Ibragimov/Ibragimova	descendant of Ibrahim	0.17150
18	Соколо́в/Соколо́ва	Sokolov/Sokolova	falcon's	0.17071
19	Моро́зов/Моро́зова	Morozov/Morozova	frost's	0.16877
20	За́йцев/За́йцева	Zaytsev/Zaytseva	hare's	0.16217

Those Russian surnames that end with -ov/-ev or -in/-yn are originally patronymic or metronymic possessive adjectivals with the meaning 'son of' or 'daughter/wife of' (the feminine is formed with the -a ending – Smirnova, Ivanova, etc.). In older documents such surnames were written with the word syn 'son', for example, Ivánov syn 'John's son' or Il'yín syn 'Elijah's son'; the last word was later dropped. Such names are roughly equivalent to the English or Welsh surnames Richardson or Richards.

The Russian equivalent of 'Smith', 'Jones', and 'Brown' (that is, the generic most often used surnames) are Ivanov, Petrov, Sidorov, or 'Johns', 'Peters', and 'Isidores', although Sidorov is now ranked only 66th.

== Sri Lanka ==
Many of the low country Sinhalese have Portuguese surnames as a result of Portuguese colonial rule in that area during the 16th and 17th centuries. Sinhalese native surnames have a Sanskrit origin. Tamils, Sri Lankan Moors and Sri Lankan Malays have distinctive surnames for their own ethnicities.

Many Sinhalese surnames end with Singhe (Sinhala: සිංහ, lit. 'lion'), such as Jayasinghe, Ranasinghe, Samarasinghe.

Rank (2014)	Name	Total Number (2014)	Language of origin and meaning
1	Perera	862,080	Portuguese
2	Fernando	520,965	Portuguese
3	de Silva	299,772	Portuguese
4	Bandara	227,388	Sinhalese
5	Kumara	201,695	Sinhalese
6	Dissanayake	172,612	Sinhalese
7	Mohamed	154,874	Arabic, of Sri Lankan Moor
8	Gamage	149,527	Sinhalese
9	Liyanage	143,854	Sinhalese
10	Jayasinghe	142,224	Sinhalese
11	Ranasinghe	139,680	Sinhalese
12	Herath	123,182	Sinhalese
13	Weerasinghe	122,008	Sinhalese
14	Peiris	115,944	Portuguese
15	Rathnayake	102,902	Sinhalese
16	Wickramasinghe	96,968	Sinhalese
17	Wijesinghe	94,816	Sinhalese
18	Hettiarachchi	87,512	Sinhalese
19	Nanayakkara	78,057	Sinhalese
20	Ahamed	74,601	Arabic, of Sri Lankan Moor
21	Rajapaksha	71,144	Sinhalese
22	Mendis	70,623	Portuguese
23	Pathirana	70,297	Sinhalese
24	Ekanayake	69,840	Sinhalese
25	Gunasekara	69,384	Sinhalese
26	Dias	67,623	Portuguese
27	Sampath	67,232	Sinhalese
28	Amarasinghe	64,949	Sinhalese
29	Ratnayake	59,863	Sinhalese
30	Chathuranga	58,754	Sinhalese
31	Senanayake	55,037	Sinhalese
32	Samarasinghe	54,320	Sinhalese
33	Lakmal	53,733	Sinhalese
34	Munasinghe	52,755	Sinhalese
35	Rodrigo	51,777	Portuguese
36	Seneviratne	51,581	Sinhalese
37	Rathnayaka	49,886	Sinhalese
38	Edirisinghe	48,516	Sinhalese
39	Jayawardena	48,386	Sinhalese
40	Fonseka	47,995	Portuguese
41	Sanjeewa	47,147	Sinhalese
42	Gunawardana	46,625	Sinhalese
43	Gunawardena	45,386	Sinhalese
44	Karunaratne	44,930	Sinhalese
45	Jayaweera	43,495	Sinhalese
46	Jayasekara	43,365	Sinhalese
47	Ranaweera	42,387	Sinhalese
48	Jayawardana	40,822	Sinhalese
49	Jayasuriya	40,561	Sinhalese
50	Madusanka	40,300	Sinhalese

== Taiwan ==
According to a comprehensive survey of residential permits released by the Taiwanese Ministry of the Interior's Department of Population in 2016, Taiwan has only 1,503 surnames. The top ten surnames in Taiwan accounted for 52.77% of the general population, and the top 100 accounted for 96.56%.

Rank		Character		Romanizations								% of total pop.
2016	Mainland (2007)	Character		Mandarin		Cantonese			Minnan		Other	% of total pop.
2016	Mainland (2007)	Trad.	Simp.	Pinyin	Wade	Jyutping	HK	Other	POJ	Other	Other	% of total pop.
1	5	陳	陈	Chén	Ch'en^{2}	Can^{4}	Chan	Chun	Tân	Ting		11.14%
2	19	林		Lín	Lin^{2}	Lam^{4}	Lam	Lum	Lîm	Lim, Liem		8.31%
3	7	黃	黄	Huáng	Huang^{2}	Wong^{4}	Wong	Wang; Vang Wung Vung	Ng	Eng, Ung; Wee, Oei; Ooi, Uy; Bong		6.05%
4	3	張	张	Zhāng	Chang^{1}	Zoeng^{1}	Cheung	Chong^{5} Chung; Cheong^{4}	Tiu	Teo, Teoh; Tio, Thio; Tiew	Tiong	5.27%
5	2	李		Lǐ	Li^{3}	Lei^{5}	Lee; Li	Le; Lei^{4}	Lí	Lee; Lie; Dee		5.13%
6	1	王		Wáng	Wang^{2}	Wong^{4}	Wong	Vong	Ông	Heng	Wung	4.11%
7	9	吳	吴	Wú	Wu^{2}	Ng^{4}	Ng	Ung^{4}, Eng	Gô͘ Ngô͘	Goh, Gouw	Woo	4.04%
8	4	劉	刘	Liú	Liu^{2}	Lau^{4}	Lau	Lao^{4} Lou	Lâu	Low; Lao, Lauw		3.16%
9	40	蔡		Cài	Ts'ai^{4}	Coi^{3}	Choi	Choy; Tsoi; Toy	Chhoà	Chua, Choa; Tjoa	Tsay; Chai	2.91%
10	6	楊	杨	Yáng	Yang^{2}	Joeng^{4}	Yeung	Yeong; Ieong^{4}	Iû	Eaw; Yeo, Yeoh; Yong; Joe, Yo	Young	2.66%

== Thailand ==
There are no common Thai surnames. Surnames were largely introduced to Thai culture only by the 1913 Surname Act. The law does not allow one to create any surname that is duplicated with any existing surnames. Under Thai law, only one family can create any given surname: any two people of the same surname must be related, and it is very rare for two people to share the same full name. In one sample of 45,665 names, 81% of family names were unique.

== Turkey ==
Rank	Name	Meaning
1	Yılmaz	intrepid/dauntless
2	Kaya	rock
3	Demir	iron
4	Şahin	falcon/hawk
5	Çelik	steel
6	Yıldız	star
7	Yıldırım	thunderbolt
8	Öztürk	pure Turk
9	Aydın	cultured/enlightened
10	Özdemir	pure iron
11	Arslan	lion
12	Doğan	falcon
13	Kılıç	sword
14	Aslan	lion
15	Çetin	stiff/tough
16	Kara	black/dark
17	Koç	ram
18	Kurt	wolf
19	Özkan	pure blood
20	Şimşek	lightning

== Vietnam ==
Rank	Name		% of total pop.
Rank	Vietnamese	Chữ Hán	% of total pop.
1	Nguyễn	阮	38%
2	Trần	陳	11%
3	Lê	黎	9.5%
4	Phạm	范	7.1%
5	Huỳnh/Hoàng	黃	5.1%
6	Phan	潘	4.5%
7	Vũ/Võ	武	3.9%
8	Đặng	鄧	2.1%
9	Bùi	裴	2%
10	Đỗ	杜	1.4%
11	Hồ	胡	1.3%
12	Ngô	吳	1.3%
13	Dương	楊	1%
14	Lý	李	0.5%
15	Phí	費	
16	Đào	陶	
17	Đoàn	段	
18	Vương	王	
19	Trịnh	鄭	
20	Trương	張	
21	Lâm	林	
22	Phùng	馮	
23	Mai	梅	
24	Tô	蘇	
25	Hà	何	
26	Tạ	謝	
27	Thân	申	
28	Trác	卓	
29	Tống	宋	
30	Hoa	華	
31	Khúc	曲	
32	Từ	徐	
33	Thường	常	
34	Tiêu	蕭	
35	Ngọ	午	
36	Kim	金	
37	Quách	郭	
38	Đàm	譚	
39	Triệu	趙	
40	Mạc	莫	
41	Thái	蔡	
42	Lưu	劉	
43	Thạch	石	
44	Lương	梁	

Due to historical contact with Chinese dynasties, Vietnamese has adopted names originating from Middle Chinese. Vietnam is in the East Asian cultural sphere.

== See also ==
- List of family name affixes
- List of most popular given names
- Lists of East Asian surnames
- Lists of most common surnames, for other continents
