= Ben-David =

Ben-David (also Ben David, BenDavid, Bendavid; Hebrew: בֶּן דָּוִד ; Persian: بن داود) is a Hebrew patronymic surname. In Hebrew, it means "son of David." It also refers to the descendants of King David. It is one of the most common surnames in Israel. It may refer to the following people:

- Abraham ben David (RABaD, 12th century CE), a Provençal rabbi and a Talmudic scholar
- Abraham ben David Caslari (14th century CE), a Catalan-Jewish physician
- Alon Ben David, an Israeli television and print journalist
- Anan ben David (8th century CE), a major founder of the Karaite movement of Judaism
- Batyah Godfrey Ben-David (1940–2026), American operatic contralto
- Jacob ben David ben Yomtob (14th century CE), a Catalan Jewish astronomer
- Joseph Ben-David (1920–1986), Israeli sociologist
- Judah ben David Hayyuj (10th century CE), a Spanish-Jewish grammarian
- Mordechai ben David (born 1951, real name Mordechai Werdyger), a Jewish-American musician
- Naftali Bendavid, an American journalist
- Solomon ben David (disambiguation)
- Zadok Ben-David, Yemen-born Israeli artist and sculptor

== See also ==
- ibn Daud (Abraham ibn Daud)
- Bendemann
- Benavides (disambiguation)
- David
- David (name)
- Davidson (name)
- Davis (surname)
- Davison (surname)
- Ben Dunkelman
