= Nurali =

Nurali may refer to:

- Nurali (name)
- Nuralı, Elâzığ
- Nurali Rural District
- Nerele, mountain ridge in Bashkortostan, Russia
