= Thatch (disambiguation) =

Thatching is crafting a roof with dry vegetation.

Thatch or Thach may also refer to:

- Thach (surname)
- Thach, Alabama, also known as "Thatch"
- Thach Weave, aerial combat tactic developed by naval aviator John S. Thach
- Thatch (comic strip), syndicated from 1994 to 1998
- Thatch (horse), thoroughbred racehorse, competing from 1972 to 1973
- Thatch (lawn), a layer of decaying material below the surface of a grass lawn
- A nickname for Margaret Thatcher, Prime Minister of the United Kingdom from 1979 to 1990
- A nickname for Geoffrey Boycott, English cricket player from 1962 to 1986
