= Ohana (disambiguation) =

Ohana is the sense of family in Hawaiian culture (spelled with an ʻokina as ʻohana).

Ohana may also refer to:

- "Ohana" (Hawaii Five-0), an episode of the television series Hawaii Five-0
- Ohana by Hawaiian, a subsidiary of Hawaiian Airlines
- Ohana Hotels and Resorts, a Honolulu-based hotel chain owned by Outrigger Hotels & Resorts
- Ohana Matsumae, a fictional character in the anime/manga Hanasaku Iroha
- Ohana project, an interferometer atop Mauna Kea
- Ohana Punch, a line of punch drinks produced by the Faygo beverage company
- Ohana (surname), a Hebrew-language surname (not related to the Hawaiian word); includes a list of people with the name
