= Damith =

Damith is a given name. Notable people with the name include:

- Damith Gunatilleke (born 1983), Sri Lankan cricketer
- Damith Indika (born 1984), Sri Lankan cricketer
- Damith Perera (born 1997), Sri Lankan cricketer
- Damith Priyadharshana (born 1993), Sri Lankan cricketer.
- Damith Ratnayake, Sri Lankan cricketer
- Damith Wijayathunga (born 1991), Sri Lankan actor
