= Jayasekara =

Jayasekara is a Sinhalese name that may refer to the following people:

Surname

- Bandula Jayasekara (c. 1960–2021), Sri Lankan journalist, broadcaster, newspaper editor and diplomat.
- Dayasiri Jayasekara (born 1969), Sri Lankan politician
- P.B Jayasekara, Sri Lankan writer and translator
- Premalal Jayasekara (born 1974), Sri Lankan politician and convicted murderer

Forename

- Jayasekara Aponsu (born 1951), Sri Lankan actor
