= Iskakov =

Iskakov (Kazakh: Ысқақов, Russian: Искаков) is a Kazakh masculine surname, its feminine counterpart is Iskakova. It may refer to

- Amiliya Iskakova (born 1995), Kazakhstani cyclist
- Bulat Iskakov (born 1947), Kazakhstani politician
- Gulzira Iskakova (born 1988), Kazakhstani handball player
- Murat Iskakov (born 1972), Russian football manager and former player
- Nurlan Iskakov, Kazakhstani politician
- Saule Iskakova (born 1972), Kazakhstan-born Russian voice actress
- Yerulan Iskakov (born 1988), Kazakhstani wrestler
