= Ratnayake =

Rathnayaka, Rathnayake, Ratnayaka, Ratnayake or Ratnayeke (Sinhala: රත්නායක, romanized: Ratnāyaka) is a Sinhalese surname originating from the words ratna (gem) and nayake (leader). Notable people with the name include:

== Rathnayaka ==
- Suranga Rathnayaka, Sri Lankan politician

== Rathnayake ==
- Anurudha Rathnayake (born 1975), boxer
- Bennett Rathnayake Sri Lankan film director
- Bimal Rathnayake, Sri Lankan politician
- Eranga Rathnayake (born 1992), Sri Lankan cricketer
- Gamini Rathnayake, Sri Lankan politician
- Gihan Rathnayake (born 2001), Sri Lankan cricketer
- Janaka Rathnayake (born 1983), Sri Lankan cricketer
- Jayantha Rathnayake (1969–2020), Sri Lankan musician
- K. B. Ratnayake (1924–2004), Sri Lankan politician
- Kumarasiri Rathnayake (born 1967), Sri Lankan politician
- Madawala Rathnayake (1940–2016), Sri Lankan journalist, lyricist, poet and novelist
- Milan Rathnayake (born 1996), Sri Lankan cricketer
- Navantha Rathnayake (born 1979), Sri Lankan cricketer
- Pavan Rathnayake (born 2002), Sri Lankan cricketer
- Pradeep Rathnayake, Sri Lankan former naval officer
- Priyantha Rathnayake (born 1989), Sri Lankan cricketer
- Rumeshika Rathnayake (born 1996), Sri Lankan athlete
- Somapala Rathnayake (1947–2017), Sri Lankan actor, composer, lyricist and musician
- Somy Rathnayake (born 1946), Sri Lankan actor
- Tharindu Rathnayake (born 1996), Sri Lankan cricketer
- Thilak Kumara Rathnayake, Sri Lankan actor
- Udara Rathnayake, Sri Lankan businessman and politician
- Victor Rathnayake (born 1942), Sri Lankan musician

== Ratnayaka ==
- Abeyratne Ratnayaka, Sri Lankan politician

== Ratnayake ==
- Allen Ratnayake, Sri Lankan singer and musician
- Amanda Ratnayake (born 1990), Sri Lankan businesswoman and beauty queen
- Amara Piyaseeli Ratnayake, Sri Lankan politician
- C. B. Ratnayake, Sri Lankan politician
- Damith Ratnayake, Sri Lankan cricketer
- Daya Ratnayake, Sri Lankan general
- Harijan Ratnayake (born 1974), Sri Lankan former athlete
- Ganganath Ratnayake (born 1984), Sri Lankan cricketer
- Janaka Ratnayake (born 1964), Sri Lankan businessman
- May Ratnayake (1892–1988), Sri Lankan physician
- Manjula Ratnayake, Sri Lankan politician
- Nilani Ratnayake, Sri Lankan athlete
- Nilantha Ratnayake (born 1968), Sri Lankan cricketer
- Nimnaka Ratnayake (born 1997), Sri Lankan cricketer
- Premil Ratnayake (1933–2013), Sri Lankan journalist, author and diplomat.
- Rita Ratnayake (1934–2006), Sri Lankan actress
- Rumesh Ratnayake (born 1964), Sri Lankan cricketer
- Shiran Ratnayake (born 1999), Sri Lankan cricketer
- S. W. D. Ratnayake (1901–1986), Sri Lankan politician
- Tilak Ratnayake, Sri Lankan politician
- V. G. W. Ratnayake (1908–1994), Sri Lankan tea planter and politician
- Vasanthi Ratnayake (born 1973), Sri Lankan cricketer

== Ratnayeke ==
- Ravi Ratnayeke (born 1960), Sri Lankan cricketer
