= Şimşek =

Şimşek is a Turkish surname meaning "lightning" and may refer to:

- Belgin Şimşek
- Beykan Şimşek (born 1995), Turkish footballer
- Çağla Şimşek (born 2002), Turkish actress
- Emre Şimşek (born 1987), Turkish alpine skier
- Hikmet Şimşek
- Enver Şimşek (1961–2000), Turkish businessman living in Germany murdered by the National Socialist Underground (NSU) terrorist group
- Hikmet Şimşek (1924–2001), Turkish conductor of Western classical music
- Kenan Şimşek (born 1968), Turkish Olympian sport wrestler and oil wrestler
- Mehmet Şimşek (born 1967), Turkish politician and government minister
- Olgun Şimşek (born 1971), Turkish actor
- Rıdvan Şimşek (born 1991), Turkish footballer
- Sibel Şimşek (born 1984), Turkish female weightlifter
- Yavuz Şimşek (born 1975), Turkish footballer
- Yusuf Şimşek (born 1947), Turkish footballer
- Zeliha Şimşek (born 1981), Turkish women's footballer and coach

== See also ==
- TAI Şimşek, Turkish high-speed target drone
