= Herath =

- Gender: Unisex
- Language: Sinhala

Herath is a Sinhalese surname. Notable people with the surname include:

- Charitha Herath, Sri Lankan academic
- Chatura Herath (born 1987), Sri Lankan cricketer
- Cyril Herath, Sri Lankan police officer
- D. B. Herath (born 1956), Sri Lankan politician
- Harold Herath (died 2007), Sri Lankan politician
- Jayarathna Herath, Sri Lankan politician
- Kanaka Herath, Sri Lankan politician
- Maheepala Herath, Sri Lankan politician
- Rangana Herath (born 1978), Sri Lankan cricketer
- Renuka Herath, Sri Lankan politician
- Samanpriya Herath (born 1976), Sri Lankan politician
- Samansiri Herath, Sri Lankan politician
- Vijitha Herath (born 1968), Sri Lankan politician
