= Karunaratne =

Karunaratne or Karunarathna (Sinhala: කරුණාරත්න, romanized: Karuṇāratna) is a Sinhalese given name and a surname. Notable people with the name include:

== Given name ==
- Karunarathna Divulgane, Sri Lankan musician and politician
- Karunarathna Paranawithana (born 1968), Sri Lankan politician

== Surname ==
=== Karunarathna ===
- Bandula Karunarathna (born 1962), Sri Lankan judge and president of the Court of Appeal (2023–2025)
- Tharushi Karunarathna (born 2004), Sri Lankan athlete

=== Karunaratne ===
- Asoka Karunaratne (1916–1988), Sri Lankan politician and philanthropist
- Dimuth Karunaratne (born 1988), Sri Lankan cricketer
- H. D. Karunaratne (born 1964), Sri Lankan economist
- Kuruppu Karunaratne (1960–2008), Sri Lankan long-distance runner who specialized in the marathon event
- Kusuma Karunaratne (born 1940), Sri Lankan academic, university administrator, Professor and scholar of Sinhalese language and literature
- Louis Karunaratne, Sri Lankan cricketer
- M. D. Namal Karunaratne, Sri Lankan politician and a former member of the Parliament of Sri Lanka
- Nayana Karunaratne, Sri Lankan beautician and a fashion designer
- Niluka Karunaratne (born 1985), Sri Lankan Olympic athlete
- Sam Karunaratne (born 1937), emeritus professor of engineering and the founding and current chancellor of the Sri Lanka Institute of Information Technology
- Vikramabahu Karunaratne, Sri Lankan politician and contestant for the Sri Lankan presidential election
- W. S. Karunaratne (1928–1986), Buddhist scholar and a fiercely independent thinker
- Karunaratne Abeysekera (1930–1983), one of Sri Lanka's most famous Sinhala broadcasters
