= Jayewardene =

- Gender: Unisex
- Language: Sinhala

Other names
- Variant forms: Jayawardana; Jayawardane; Jayawardena; Jayawardene; Jayawardhana; Jayewardena

Jayewardene, Jayawardene or Jayawardena, is a Sinhalese surname. Notable people with the surname include:

- Amal Jayawardane, Sri Lankan historian
- A. S. Jayawardene (1936–2018), Sri Lankan economist and civil servant
- Asoka Jayawardena, Sri Lankan army officer
- Athula Jayawardane, Sri Lankan army officer
- Dilan Jayawardane, Sri Lankan American engineer
- Dommie Jayawardena (1927–1979), Sri Lankan actor and singer
- Eugene Wilfred Jayewardene (1874–1932), Ceylonese lawyer and judge
- Harry Jayawardena (born 1942), Sri Lankan businessman
- Hector Alfred Jayewardene (1870–1913), Ceylonese lawyer and politician
- Hector Wilfred Jayewardene (1916–1990), Sri Lankan lawyer
- J. R. Jayewardene (1906–1996), Sri Lankan politician
- Jayalath Jayawardena (1953–2013), Sri Lankan physician and politician
- John Adrian St. Valentine Jayewardene (1877–1927), Ceylonese lawyer and judge
- Kasun Kalhara Jayawardhana (born 1981), Sri Lankan Sinhala vocalist, guitarist, record producer
- Kumari Jayawardena (born 1931), Sri Lankan academic
- Lal Jayawardena (1935–2004), Sri Lankan economist and diplomat
- Lucky Jayawardena (1955–2025), Sri Lankan politician
- Mahela Jayawardene (born 1977), Sri Lankan cricketer
- N. U. Jayawardena (1908–2002), Sri Lankan economist and banker
- Nalin Jayawardena (born 1957), Sri Lankan singer and vocalist
- Nuwan Jayawardene (born 1978), Sri Lankan cricketer
- Prasad Jayawardene (born 1980), Sri Lankan cricketer
- Prasanna Jayawardena (1956–2019), Sri Lankan puisne justice of the Supreme Court
- Prasanna Jayawardene (born 1979), Sri Lankan cricketer
- Ranil Jayawardena (born 1986), British politician
- Ray Jayawardhana, Sri Lankan academic
- Sahan Jayawardene (born 1990), Sri Lankan cricketer
- Sarath Jayawardene (born 1969), Sri Lankan cricketer
- Theodore Godfrey Wijesinghe Jayewardene (1872–1945), Ceylonese engineer and politician
- Thesara Jayawardane, Sri Lankan actress
- Tony Jayawardena (born 1978), British actor
