= Ranaweera =

Ranaweera is a Sinhalese surname. It may refer to:

- Donald Jasen Ranaweera (1921–2000), Sri Lankan politician, planter and press baron
- Inoka Ranaweera, Sri Lankan cricketer
- Jayatissa Ranaweera, Sri Lankan politician
- M. P. Ranaweera, Sri Lankan academic
- Prasanna Ranaweera, Sri Lankan politician
- R. P. A. Ranaweera Pathirana, Sri Lankan politician
- Vijitha Ranaweera, Sri Lankan politician
