= Nerele =

Mountain ridge in Russia

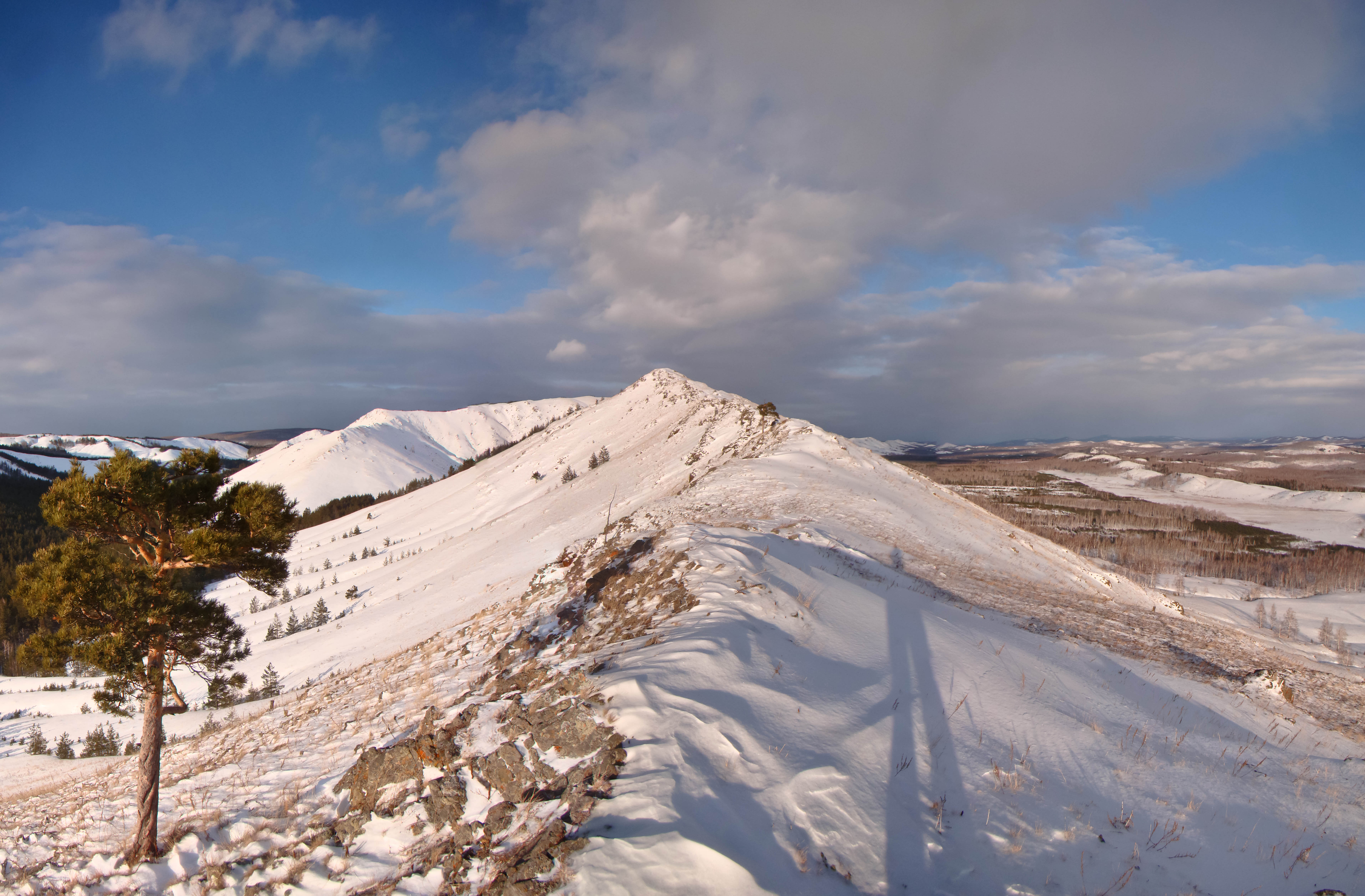
- Nerele mountain ridge in winter

Highest point
- Elevation: 752 m (2,467 ft)
- Coordinates: 54°47′00″N 59°38′01″E

Geography
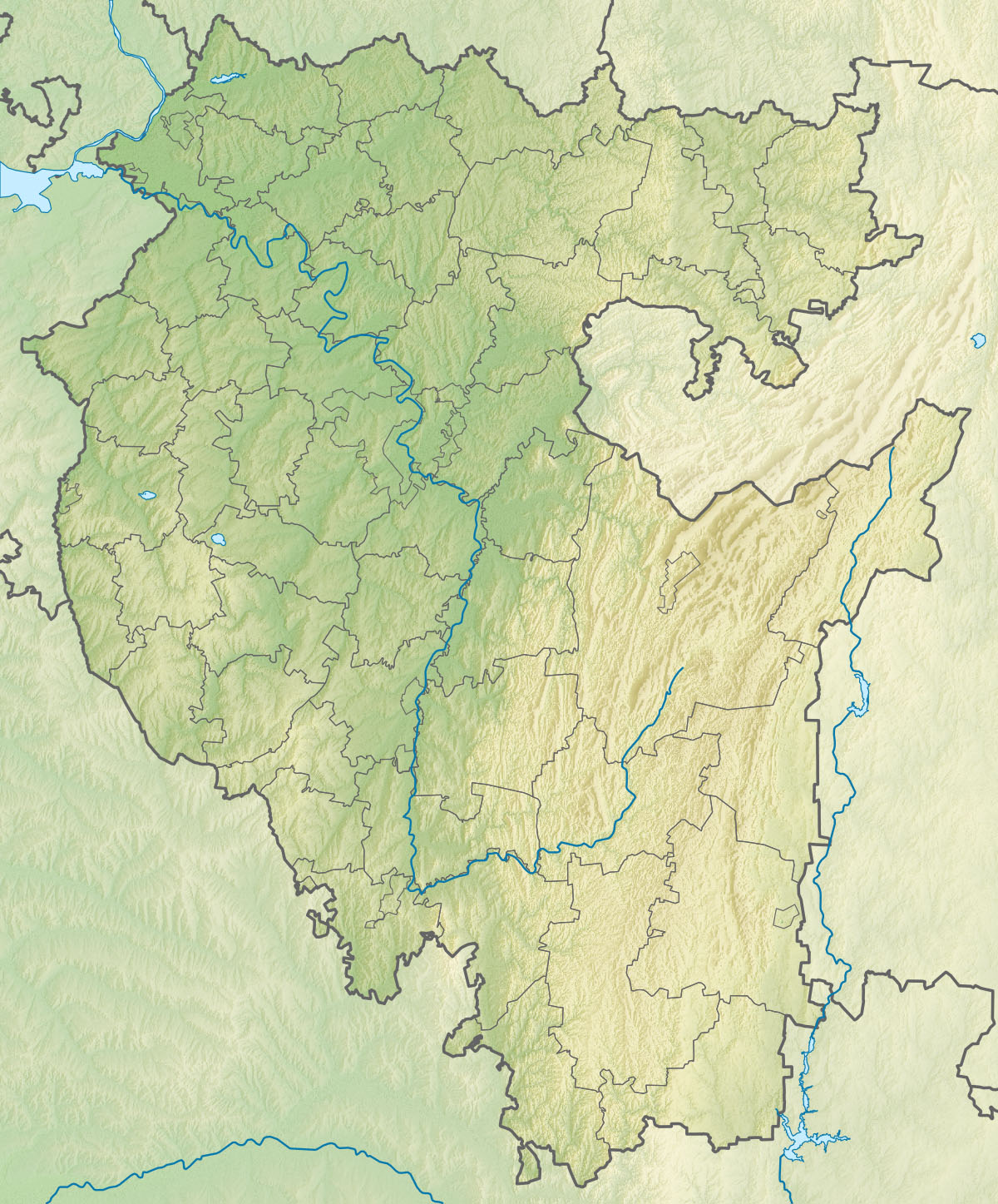
- Location within Bashkortostan Location within European Russia
- Location: Bashkortostan, Russia
- Parent range: Southern Ural

Nerele (transliteration from Bashkir) or Nurali (transliteration from Russian) is a mountain ridge in the Southern Urals in Bashkortostan, Russia.

== Physical geography ==
It is located in the Uchalisky District of Bashkortostan, a few kilometers northwest of Starobayramgulovo. The maximum height of the ridge is 752 meters. The peaks of Nerele are round and treeless, despite their low height. The Miass River, its tributary Sherambay and its tributary Uya Shardatma originate on the slopes of the ridge. The ridge is a popular destination for jeeps, ATVs, motorcycles and bicycles.

The Ridge is 8 km long and 2 km wide. It is connected by a bridge (628 m) with the Siritur ridge. Covered with meadow vegetation, in ravines, gorges and quads - a dense forest.

The ridge is composed of Silurian deposits: tuffs, siliceous and clayey rocks, limestones (440-410 million years BC), as well as hyperbasites.

Landscapes - pine and birch forests on dark gray forest mountain soils and meadow steppes on leached chernozems.

== Flora ==
The tree species of the ridge: pine, larch, spruce, fir, birch, aspen, gray alder. Shrubs: bird cherry, viburnum, mountain ash, hawthorn, wild rose, currant, cherry, broom, willow, hazel, euonymus. For the most part, the ridge is bare, only in some places is covered with coniferous or mixed forest.

== Sources ==
- Нуралинский гипербазитовый комплекс
- clubs.ya.ru
- uraltur
- Хребет Нурали | Путеводитель по Челябинску и Челябинской области
