= Liyanage =

Liyanage is a Sri Lankan (Sinhalese) name written as ලියනගේ in Sinhalese. It means ‘house of writing’, from Sinhalese liyana (ලියන) ‘writing’ (Sanskrit likhana) + ge (ගේ) ‘house’ (Sanskrit grʿha). It can be interpreted as "belonging to the house of writing" or " belonging to the house of the family of writing. It shows that the Liyanage family name may have been associated with education, administration, or other roles that required written communication. Liyanage may refer to:

- A. S. P. Liyanage, Sri Lankan businessman, television and film producer, and diplomat
- Athma Liyanage, Sri Lankan singer and songwriter
- Dayantha Liyanage, MBE, FMS, MCMI, Sri Lankan born British politician and management consultant
- Douglas Liyanage, CCS, former Sri Lankan civil servant
- Dulip Liyanage (born 1972), former Sri Lankan cricketer
- E. P. B. Liyanage, CEng, psc, MRAeS, FIE(SL), retired officer of the Sri Lanka Air Force
- Grashan Liyanage (born 1963), Sri Lankan former first-class cricketer
- Hemasiri Liyanage (born 1942), Sri Lankan television, cinema and theatre actor
- Himasha Liyanage (born 1996), Sri Lankan cricketer
- Imal Liyanage (born 1977), Sri Lankan cricketer
- Imal Liyanage (born 1994), Sri Lankan-born cricketer for Qatar
- Indrachapa Liyanage (born 1982), Sri Lankan singer
- Janith Liyanage (born 1995), Sri Lankan cricketer
- Nadeeka Lakmali Babaranda Liyanage (born 1981), Sri Lankan javelin thrower
- Saumya Liyanage, Sri Lankan actor
- Parry Liyanage, Sri Lankan military officer, athlete and coach
- Srimath Indrajith Liyanage, television, music and literary personality in Sri Lanka
- Sumith Liyanage (born 1936), Ceylonese sportsman
- Vikum Liyanage, retired Sri Lankan General and commander.

== See also ==
- Liana
- Lyana
- Lynge (disambiguation)
