= Alfredo de los Santos =

Alfredo de los Santos may refer to:

- Alfredo de los Santos (footballer) (born 1956), Uruguayan footballer
- Alfredo de los Santos (cyclist) (born 1969), Dominican-American para-cyclist

== See also ==
- Alfred delos Santos (born 1991), Filipino politician
- De Los Santos (disambiguation)
