= Ram (surname) =

Ram is a surname. Notable people with the surname include:

- Abel Ram (disambiguation), several Anglo-Irish landowners and politicians
- Andy Ram (born 1980), Israeli tennis player
- Arnold Ram, Trinidad and Tobago politician
- Buck Ram (1907-1991), American songwriter, producer and arranger born Samuel Ram
- Jagjivan Ram (1908–1986), Indian independence activist and politician from Bihar
- Mola Ram (1743–1833), Indian painter
- N. Ram (born 1945), Indian journalist, editor and businessman
- Nandamuri Kalyan Ram (born 1978), Indian Tollywood film actor
- Nithya Ram (1990-1991), Indian actress
- Rachita Ram (1992-1993), Indian actress
- Raghu Ram Indian tv presenter
- Rajeev Ram (born 1984), American tennis player
- Shadi Ram, Indian politician
