= Soriano =

Soriano may refer to:

- Soriano (surname), a Spanish-language surname

== Places ==
- Palma Soriano, Cuba
- Soriano Calabro, Italy
- Soriano nel Cimino, Italy
- Soriano, former name of the town of Colón, Querétaro, Mexico
- Villa Soriano, Uruguay
- Soriano Department, Uruguay

== Other ==
- A Soriano Aviation, Philippine airline
- Soriano (film), a 1999 documentary film by Eduardo Montes-Bradley

== See also ==
- Saint Dominic in Soriano, a miraculous portrait associated with Soriano, Calabro
