= Pathirana =

Pathirana is a common Sinhalese surname. People with that name include:

- Buddhika Pathirana, Sri Lankan politician
- Jaya Pathirana, Sri Lankan politician and judge
- Matheesha Pathirana, Sri Lankan cricketer
- Nandasena Pathirana, Sri Lankan cricket umpire
- Ramesh Pathirana, Sri Lankan politician
- Richard Pathirana, Sri Lankan politician
- R. P. A. Ranaweera Pathirana, Sri Lankan politician
- Sachith Pathirana, Sri Lankan cricketer
- Shehan Pathirana, Sri Lankan rugby player
- Assassination of Daya Pathirana

== See also ==
- Barred danio (Devario pathirana), a species of fish
