= Soriano (surname) =

Soriano is a Spanish-language surname (actually the demonym of the city of Soria, Spain). It also occurs in other languages with various meanings.

Notable people with the surname include:

- Alfonso Soriano (born 1976), Dominican baseball player
- Andrés Soriano (1898–1964), Philippine industrialist
- Antero Soriano (1888–1929), Philippine senator
- Bruno Soriano (born 1984), Spanish footballer
- Christopher Soriano, Jr. (born 1997), American rapper known as CJ
- Dewey Soriano (1920–1998), baseball executive
- Edward Soriano (born 1946), American army officer
- Elia Soriano (born 1989), German-Italian footballer
- Eliseo "Eli" Soriano (1947–2021), Philippine religious broadcaster
- Esteban Soriano (1900–1969), Puerto Rican artist and musician
- Francesco Soriano (1548/49–1621), Italian renaissance composer
- Joan Soriano (born 1972), Dominican bachata singer and guitarist
- Joel Soriano (born 2000), American basketball player
- Jonathan Soriano (born 1985), Spanish footballer
- José Soriano (baseball) (born 1998), Dominican baseball player
- José Soriano (footballer) (1917–2011), Peruvian footballer
- Juan Soriano (artist) (1920–2006), Mexican painter and sculptor
- Juan Soriano (footballer) (born 1997), Spanish footballer
- Marc Soriano (1918–1994), French philosopher and writer
- Mari Cruz Soriano (born 1955), Spanish entrepreneur and presenter
- Maricel Soriano (born 1965), Filipina actress
- Meryll Soriano (born 1982), Filipina actress
- Osvaldo Soriano (1943–1997), Argentine journalist and writer
- Pepe Soriano (1929–2023), Argentine actor and playwright
- Peter Soriano (born 1959), Philippine-born French-American artist
- Rafael Soriano (born 1979), Dominican baseball player
- Rafael Soriano (painter) (1920–2015), Cuban painter
- Raphael Soriano (1904–1988), American architect
- Roberto Soriano (born 1991), German-Italian footballer
- Vicente Soriano (born 1953), Valencian businessman
- Waldick Soriano (1933–2008), Brazilian singer-songwriter

== See also ==
- Soriano (disambiguation)
