= Abel Ram =

Abel Ram may refer to:

- Abel Ram (1669–1740), MP for Gorey
- Abel Ram (1706–1778), MP for Gorey
- Abel Ram (1754–1830), MP for Duleek and for County Wexford
