= Ahamed =

Ahamed is a surname. Notable people with the surname include:

- E. Ahamed, Indian politician
- Emajuddin Ahamed (1933–2020), Bangladeshi academic
- Liaquat Ahamed, American writer
- M.C. Ahamed (died 2008), Sri Lankan politician
- Mohammed Ahamed (born 1985), Norwegian-Somali footballer
- Salim Ahamed (born 1970), Indian film director, producer and screenwriter
