= Luu =

Lưu or Luu without diacritics is a Vietnamese surname, and transliteration of the Chinese surname Liu (劉). Notable people with the surname include:

Lưu (劉) family, Vietnamese Five Colours Flag

- Lưu Cơ (chữ Hán: 劉基), one of "four important people" under Đinh Dynasty of Emperor Đinh Bộ Lĩnh. Lưu Cơ was the first mayor of Đại La city (modern Hanoi) nominated directly by Đinh Tiên Hoàng after Vietnam regained independence from China.
- Lưu Quang Vũ, Vietnamese playwright, poet and writer
- Đinh Xuân Lưu, Vietnamese ambassador to Poland and Israel
- Janette Luu, Vietnamese-American broadcaster
- Lưu Hữu Phước, Vietnamese composer
- Lưu Huỳnh, Vietnamese American film director
- Lưu Huy Chao (born 1936), North Vietnamese military pilot
- Luu Meng, Chinese Cambodian chef, culinary author and hospitality entrepreneur
- Lưu Trọng Lư, Vietnamese poet, writer, play writer
- Thang Luu, Vietnamese American professional poker
- Jane Luu (born 1963), Vietnamese American astronomer
