= Samarasinghe =

Samarasinghe may refer to

- G.V.P. Samarasinghe, Sri Lankan civil servant
- H. H. R. Samarasinghe, Sri Lankan Physician
- Mahinda Samarasinghe, Sri Lankan politician
- Mendaka Samarasinghe, Sri Lankan Army officer
- Thisara Samarasinghe, Sri Lankan navy officer
- T. M. Samarasinghe, Sri Lankan cricket umpire.
- Sandith Samarasinghe, Sri Lankan politician
