= De Los Santos =

De Los Santos, also spelled delos Santos in the Philippines, is a Spanish surname meaning "of the saints". Notable people with the surname include:

- Abel De Los Santos (born 1992), American baseball player
- Alejandro de los Santos (1902–1982), Argentinian football player
- Alfredo de los Santos (disambiguation), multiple people
- Deyvison De Los Santos (born 2003), Dominican Republic baseball player
- Enyel De Los Santos (born 1995), Dominican Republic baseball player
- Epifanio de los Santos (1871–1928), Filipino historian
- Fautino de los Santos (born 1986), Dominican Republic baseball player
- Gonzalo de los Santos (born 1976), Uruguayan football player
- Jaime de los Santos (born 1946), Filipino general
- Ramón de los Santos (1949–2015), Dominican Republic baseball player
- Valerio de los Santos (born 1972), Dominican Republic baseball player
- William de los Santos, (born 1964), actor
- Yerry De Los Santos (born 1997), Dominican baseball player
- Luis de los Santos (first baseman), Dominican baseball player
- Luis De Los Santos (third baseman), Dominican baseball player

== See also ==
- 33219 De Los Santos, an asteroid
- Epifanio de los Santos Avenue
