= Tạ =

Tạ, sometimes anglicized as Ta, is a Vietnamese surname of Han Chinese origin. It is the Vietnamese variation of the Chinese surname Xie (謝).

Chinese from Vietnam whose ancestors migrated from South China to Vietnam have adopted this Vietnamese surname. The word "Tạ" is Sino-Vietnamese for the character "謝".

Other diasporic variations if the surname Xie (the Pinyin spelling in Standard Mandarin) include:

- Hsieh (Mandarin, in Wade-Giles)
- Tse, Tze, Che, Jay (Cantonese)
- Chia, Cheah, Sia (Hokkien)
- Chia (Teochew)
- Zhia, Zia (Shanghainese)
- Sa (Korean)

Notable Vietnamese people with the surname include:

- Tạ Chí Đại Trường (1939–2016), Vietnamese historian
- Ta Mok (1926–2006), Cambodian military leader
- Tạ Phong Tần (born 1968), Vietnamese dissident
- Tạ Thu Thâu (1906–1945), Vietnamese politician
- Tạ Tỵ (1922–2004), Vietnamese painter
- Tạ Văn Phụng (died 1865), Vietnamese nobleman

== See also ==
- Xie (surname)
