= Chatura Herath =

Sri Lankan cricketer (born 1987)

Chatura Herath (born Herath Mudiyanselage Chatura Udayanga Herath on 26 April 1987) was a Sri Lankan cricketer. He was a right-handed batsman and wicket-keeper who played for Moors Sports Club. He was born in Colombo.

Herath made his cricketing debut for Sri Lanka Under-19s in a tour of England which saw him play in two Under-19 One Day Internationals and two Under-19 Tests. During the 2006 season, he made eight appearances for Moors Under-23s.

Herath made a single first-class appearance for the side, during the 2006–07 season, against Ragama Cricket Club. From the lower-middle order, he scored a single run in the first innings in which he batted, and a duck in the second.

Herath continued to play for Moors Sports Club Under-23s until the end of 2007. He moved to Sinhalese Sports Club Under-23s to play in the 2008 tournament.
