= Ibragimov =

Ibragimov, Ibrahimov (masculine, Russian: Ибрагимов) or Ibragimova, Ibrahimova (feminine, Russian: Ибрагимова) is a common Azerbaijani, Bashkir, Tatar and Central Asian surname. The spelling reflects the Cyrillic alphabet's version of the name Ibrahim, an Islamic version of the name Abraham.

- Alevtina Ibragimova (born 2005), Russian tennis player
- Alijan Ibragimov (1954–2021), Uzbek-born Kazakhstani oligarch
- Alina Ibragimova (born 1985), Russian violinist
- Amir Ibragimov (born 2007), Russian footballer
- Aziz Ibrahimov (born 1986), Uzbekistani footballer
- Ibrahim Ibrahimov (born 1958), Azerbaijani businessman
- Ildar Ibragimov (born 1967), Russian-American chess player
- Ildar Abdulovich Ibragimov (born 1932), Russian mathematician
- Magomed Ibragimov (wrestler, born 1983), Uzbekistani wrestler
- Magomed Ibragimov (wrestler, born 1974), Azerbaijani wrestler
- Mubariz Ibrahimov (1988–2010), National Hero of Azerbaijan
- Nail H. Ibragimov (1939–2018), Russian mathematician
- Nadir Ibragimov (1932–1977), Soviet astronomer
- Rinat Ibragimov (ice hockey) (born 1986), Russian professional ice hockey defenceman
- Rinat Ibragimov (judoka) (born 1986), Kazakhstani judoka
- Rinat Ibragimov (musician) (1960–2020), Russian-Tatar classical double bass player
- Shaymardan Ibragimov (1899–1957), Turkmen politician
- Sultan Ibragimov (born 1975), Russian heavyweight professional boxer
- Timur Ibragimov (born 1975), Uzbek heavyweight professional boxer and cousin of Sultan Ibragimov
- Yıldız İbrahimova (born 1952), Bulgarian singer of Turkish ancestry

== See also ==
- Ibragimov (crater), a crater on Mars
