= Sampath (disambiguation) =

Sampath is a given name and surname. It may also refer to:

- Gaali Sampath, 2021 Indian Telugu-language survival drama film
- Sampath (actor) (1904–1983), Indian film actor
- Mr. Sampath – The Printer of Malgudi, 1949 novel by R. K. Narayan
- Mr. Sampath (1972 film), Indian Tamil-language satirical film
- Onbathu Kuzhi Sampath, 2020 Indian Tamil-language romantic drama film
- Sampath Bank, Sri Lankan commercial bank
