= Batyah Godfrey Ben-David =

American operatic contralto

- Born: October 24, 1940; Portland, Maine, U.S.
- Died: April 29, 2026 (aged 85); Stamford, Connecticut, U.S.
- Education: Juilliard School
- Occupation: Operatic contralto

Batyah Godfrey Ben-David (October 24, 1940 – April 29, 2026) was an American operatic contralto. Educated at Juilliard School, she performed at the Metropolitan Opera from 1969 to 1988.
