= Munasinghe =

Munasinghe or Moonesinghe is a Sinhalese name that may refer to the following people:

Surname

- Bandu Munasinghe (1936–2005), Sri Lankan actor
- Dharma Sri Munasinghe (1930–2004), Sri Lankan radio playwright, film screenwriter and director
- Gayashan Munasinghe (born 1986), Sri Lankan-born Italian cricketer
- Manjula Munasinghe (born 1971), Sri Lankan cricketer and Australian cricket coach
- Mohan Munasinghe, Sri Lankan physicist, academic and economist
- P. L. Munasinghe, Sri Lankan rugby player
- Priya Munasinghe (1941–2001), Sri Lankan motor racing champion
- S. J. Munasinghe, 33rd Surveyor General of Sri Lanka
- Sanjeewa Munasinghe (born 1959), Sri Lankan military physician and administrator
- Sarath Munasinghe (1949–2008 ), Sri Lankan military officer and politician
