= Hettiarachchi =

Hettiarachchi (Sinhala: හෙට්ටිආරච්චි, romanized: Heṭṭiāracci) is a Sinhalese surname. Notable people with the surname include:

- Champika Hettiarachchi, Sri Lankan politician
- D. F. Hettiarachchi (1919–1970), Ceylonese politician
- Dananjaya Hettiarachchi, Sri Lankan public speaker
- Dinuka Hettiarachchi (born 1976), Sri Lankan cricketer
- Gamini Hettiarachchi (1950–2019), Sri Lankan actor
- Gamini Hettiarachchi, Sri Lankan retired army officer
- Hasantha Hettiarachchi, Sri Lankan journalist and television presenter
- Heshan Hettiarachchi (born 1998), Sri Lankan cricketer
- Indradasa Hettiarachchi (1927–2025), Sri Lankan politician
- Pradeep Hettiarachchi, Sri Lankan judge of the Court of Appeal
- Radhika Hettiarachchi (born 1977), Sri Lankan rugby union player
- Shehan Hettiarachchi (born 1994), Sri Lankan cricketer
- Sunil Hettiarachchi (born 1937), Sri Lankan comedian and actor
- Wijepala Hettiarachchi, Sri Lankan politician
