= Khúc =

Khúc is a Vietnamese surname.

== Notable people with the surname Khúc ==
- Khúc family, a session of leaders who challenged Tang rule over Vietnam.
  - Khúc Thừa Dụ, the head of the Khúc family
  - Khúc Hạo
  - Khúc Thừa Mỹ
