= Solomon ben David =

Solomon ben David may refer to:

- Solomon, Solomon ben David, son of King David who succeeded his father as King of Israel and founded the line of the Kings of Judah, 10th century BCE
- Solomon (Karaite prince), Karaite leader of the late tenth and early eleventh centuries CE, son of David ben Boaz
