= Saule Iskakova =

Kazakhstan-born Russian actress (born 1972)

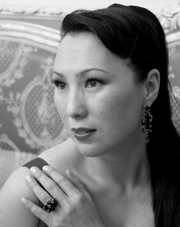
- Born: Saule Sabitovna Iskakova; Temirtau, Kazakh SSR, Soviet Union (now Kazakhstan)
- Occupation: Actress (voice)
- Years active: 1991–2021
- Awards: Honored Artist of the RSFSR

Saule Sabitovna Iskakova (Russian: Сауле Сабитовна Искакова) is a Kazakhstan-born Russian actress (voice).

== Biography ==
Saule Iskakova was born in Temirtau, Kazakhstan. She trained for the theater at the Saint Petersburg State Theatre Arts Academy from which she graduated in 1993.

== Career ==
Ms. Iskakova is currently a soprano soloist with the Zazerkalye State Theater in St-Petersburg and performs with the tango ensembles Anima, Primavera, and Soledad-orquesta. In addition to theater music, Ms. Iskakova gives concerts and recitals of classical music and German lieder. Her role as Despina in Così fan tutte highlights a special interest in the music of Mozart. The St. Petersburg Gazette praised her performance in the Mozart anniversary concert at the Zazerkalye State Theater and described her voice as "absolutely smooth with crystal clear tone."

Her voice is instantly recognizable in Russia as the voice-over for Disney film characters Mulan (Mulan and Mulan II), Belle (Beauty and the Beast), Megara and Calliope (Hercules), as well as Minnie Mouse.

In 2004, Ms. Iskakova became involved with tango and the music of Ástor Piazzolla. She appeared with Horacio Ferrer, Piazzolla's lyrical collaborator, during his visit to St-Petersburg in 2004. In 2005, Ms. Iskakova and the ensemble Anima were awarded the "Premio della critica" (the critics prize) award at Piazzolla Music Awards festival at Casale Monferrato, Italy. She appeared at the 2007 World of Tango Festival in Tampere, Finland, and at the 2008, 2009, and 2010 White Nights Tango Festival in St-Petersburg.

In February, 2011, Ms. Iskakova was named an Honored Artist of the Russian Federation (Заслуженная артистка Российской Федерации).
