= Nayana Karunaratne =

Sri Lankan beautician and fashion designer

- Born: Colombo, Sri Lanka

Nayana Karunaratne is a Sri Lankan beautician and a fashion designer. She owns the company called Salon Nayana established in 1980 and a founder of Sri Lanka Association of Hairdressers And Beauticians (SLAHAB) established in 1996.

== Career ==
Today Salon Nayana owned by Nayana operates ten branches throughout Sri Lanka and India. She launched her first overseas establishment Salon Nayana at Chennai in April 2002.

Around 1,500 member, the Sri Lanka Association of Hairdressers And Beauticians (SLAHAB) was established in 1996 through the endeavors of Nayana with the aim of elevating the profession of hairdressing in Sri Lanka to an international level. It was initially inspired and encouraged by Jun Encarnacion, a hairdresser and longtime president of the Hairdressers and Cosmetologist Association of the Philippines (HACAP).

Nayana conducted a training at a session of a live hair cutting demonstration at Karachi, Pakistan in early 2007. The program was sponsored by a company in collaboration with Pakistan Hair and Beauty Association (PHABA) and Sri Lanka's SLAHAB.
