= Lynge =

Lynge (/ˈlɪndʒ/ LINJ) is a family name of Danish and Swedish origin. The name is pronounced [ˈlʏ̌ŋːɛ] in Swedish.

Examples include:

- Aqqaluk Lynge - a co-founder of the Inuit Ataqatigiit
- Bernt Arne Lynge - a Norwegian botanist whose taxonomic author abbreviation is Lynge
- Simon Lynge - a singer-songwriter raised in Greenland
- Herman H. J. Lynge - Danish antiquarian bookseller

In Denmark, Lynge is also the name of several towns, including:

- Lynge, Allerød Municipality, Allerød Municipality
