= Senanayake =

- Gender: Unisex
- Language: Sinhala

Other names
- Variant form: Senanayaka

Senanayake or Senanayaka is a Sinhalese surname. Notable people with the surname include:

== Notable people ==
- Charith Senanayake (born 1962), Sri Lankan cricketer
- D. S. Senanayake (1884–1952), Ceylonese politician
- Dudley Senanayake (1911–1973), Ceylonese politician
- E. L. Senanayake (1920–2000), Sri Lankan politician
- Florence Senanayake, Ceylonese politician
- Fredrick Richard Senanayake (1882–1926), Ceylonese lawyer and politician
- G. B. Senanayake (1913–1985), Sri Lankan writer
- Maithripala Senanayake (1916–1998), Ceylonese politician
- Mollie Dunuwila Senanayake, Ceylonese political figure
- Nimal Senanayake, Sri Lankan physician and academic
- Richard Gotabhaya Senanayake (1911–1970), Ceylonese politician
- Rosy Senanayake (born 1958), Sri Lankan activist and politician
- Rukman Senanayake (1948–2024), Sri Lankan politician
- Sachithra Senanayake (born 1985), Sri Lankan cricketer
- Wasantha Senanayake (born 1973), Sri Lankan politician
- Wilfred Senanayake (1918–2008), Ceylonese politician
