= Starobayramgulovo =

Starobayramgulovo Старобайрамгулово
- Village
- Location within Bashkortostan Location within Russia
- Coordinates: 54°43′N 59°42′E
- Country: Russia
- Region: Bashkortostan
- District: Uchalinsky District
- Time zone: UTC+5:00

Starobayramgulovo (Russian: Старобайрамгулово; Bashkir: Иҫке Байрамғол, İśke Bayramğol) is a rural locality (a village) in Tungatarovsky Selsoviet, Uchalinsky District, Bashkortostan, Russia. The population was 281 as of 2010. There are 7 streets.

== Geography ==
Starobayramgulovo is located 60 km northeast of Uchaly (the district's administrative centre) by road. Orlovka is the nearest rural locality.
