= P. B. Jayasekara =

Sri Lankan short-story writer and translator

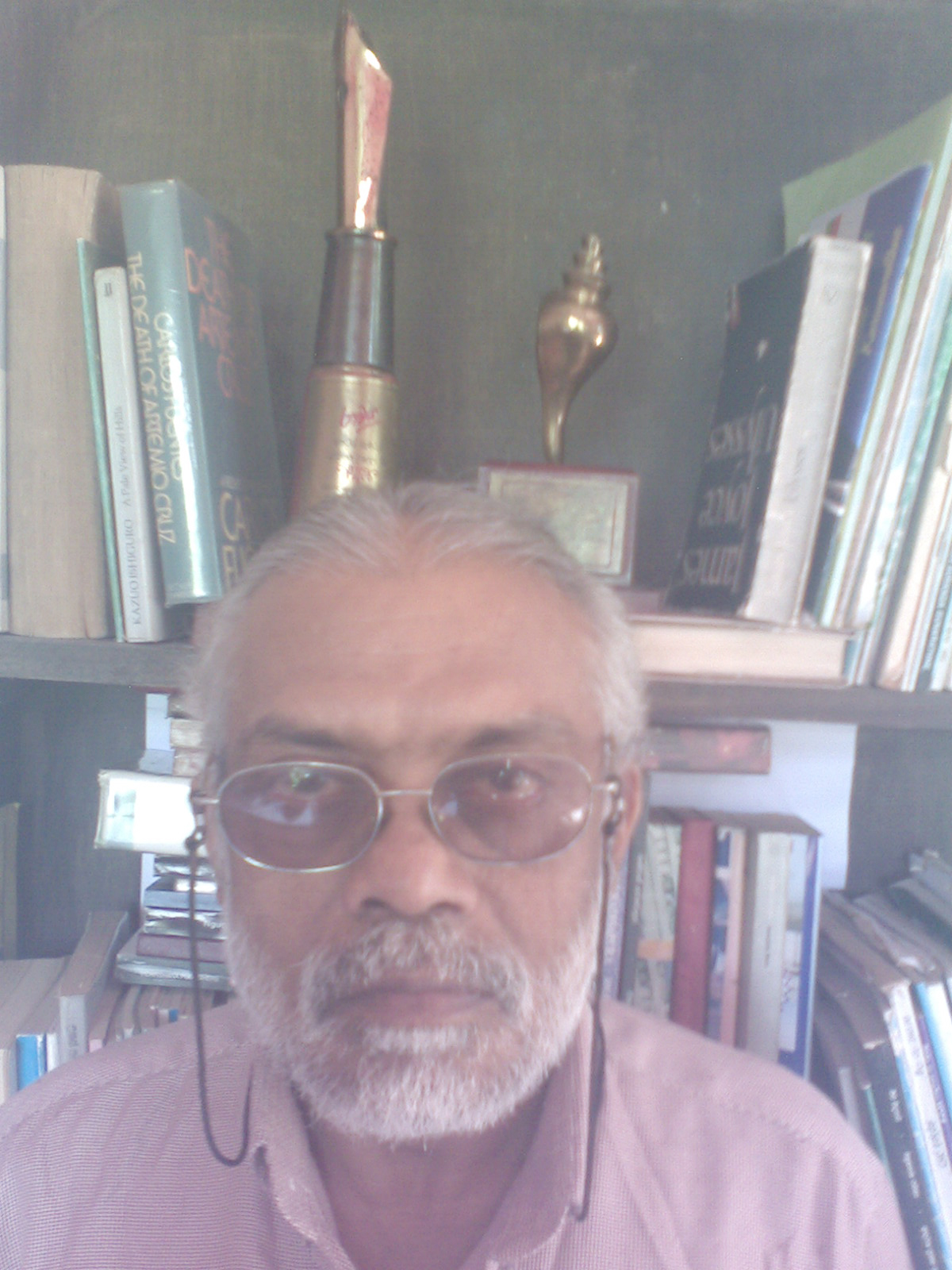
Jayasekara in 2010

P. B. Jayasekara (Sinhala: පි.බි.ජයසේකර), also known as Premathilaka Jayasekara, is a Sri Lankan short story writer and translator. His short story, kotiya (Sinhala: කොටියා) was awarded the first place at the Ravaya (Sinhala: රාවය) literary festivals in 1993 and Daruduka (Sinhala: දරුදුක) won the first place at the "Independent literary festival" (Sinhala: ස්වදීන සහිත්‍ය උළෙල) in 1994.

== Works ==
=== Short story books ===
- Kotiya (Sinhala: කොටියා)-ISBN 955-9034-34-0

==== Translations ====
- Nadan Daruwa (Sinhala: නාඬන් දරුව)-ISBN 955-96242-1-0.
- Kurusaye lu yakshaya (Sinhala: කුරුසයේ ලු යක්ෂයා)-ISBN 955-96242-0-2
- Nisala Kadu (Sinhala: නිසල කඳු) -ISBN 955-8033-92-8
- Beloved (Sinhala: බිලව්ඩ්)- ISBN 978-955-1559-04-5

== Writing career ==
P.B. Jayasekara started his writing career as a top-level journalist. In the 1980s, he was one of the leading historical article writers in Sri Lanka. His articles were published in The Island and The Sunday Observer. Later he became a sub-editor in Sandesaya in (Sinhala: සන්දේශය) and Vivarana (Sinhala: විවරන) magazines

See Also The Official website of P.B Jayasekara

- http://pbjayasekara.webs.com

Read his short stories online

- https://sinhalinketikatha.blogspot.com/
- http://pbjayasekara.webs.com/apps/links/
