= Nuwan Jayawardene =

Sri Lankan cricketer (born 1978)

Nuwan Jayawardene (born Sanjeewa Nuwan Jayawardene on 24 October 1978) was a Sri Lankan cricketer. He was a right-handed batsman and a right-arm off-break bowler who played for Colts Cricket Club. He was born in Colombo.

Jayawardene made a single first-class appearance for the side, during the 1999–2000 season, against Tamil Union Cricket and Athletic Club. He failed to score a run in either innings in which he batted.

Jayawardene bowled two overs in the match, conceding a single run.
