= List of the most popular surnames of Kazakhs of Kazakhstan =

The list of the most common 1000 surnames of Kazakhs of Kazakhstan for 2023. The surnames are listed according to their spelling in the document. According to the Bureau of National Statistics of the Republic of Kazakhstan.

== List ==
Surnames are given in masculine gender. Female surnames have suffixes -ова, -ева, -ина, -қызы instead -ов, -ев, -ин, -ұлы.

No.	Surnames cyrillic	Surnames Latin	Total	Male	Female
1	Ахметов	Akhmetov	57482	26680	30802
2	Серік	Serik	44706	24046	20660
3	Омаров	Omarov	37358	17415	19943
4	Оспанов	Ospanov	35748	16677	19071
5	Сулейменов	Suleymenov	28748	13272	15476
6	Марат	Marat	28303	15058	13245
7	Искаков	Iskakov	26462	12120	14342
8	Амангелді	Amangeldi	25850	13860	11990
9	Калиев	Kaliyev	24552	11458	13094
10	Болат	Bolat	24176	12947	11229
11	Мұрат	Murat	23641	12779	10862
12	Ибраев	Ibrayev	22908	10663	12245
13	Абдрахманов	Abdrakhmanov	22598	10522	12076
14	Смагулов	Smagulov	20902	9738	11164
15	Қайрат	Qayrat	19804	10508	9296
16	Нұрлан	Nurlan	19176	10172	9004
17	Садыков	Sadykov	18530	8616	9914
18	Нургалиев	Nurgaliyev	18464	8687	9777
19	Серікбай	Serikbay	17675	9544	8131
20	Асқар	Asqar	16947	8857	8090
21	Кусаинов	Kusainov	16745	7773	8972
22	Тулегенов	Tulegenov	16185	7650	8535
23	Талғат	Talğat	16129	8553	7576
24	Аубакиров	Aubakirov	15194	7089	8105
25	Жумабаев	Zhumabayev	15171	7172	7999
26	Султанов	Sultanov	14962	6840	8122
27	Абишев	Abishev	14841	6927	7914
28	Жунусов	Zhunusov	14814	6955	7859
29	Жақсылық	Zhaqsılıq	14794	7933	6861
30	Алиев	Aliyev	14360	6703	7657
31	Асанов	Asanov	14262	6702	7560
32	Серикбаев	Serikbayev	13950	6696	7254
33	Сарсенбаев	Sarsenbayev	13812	6520	7292
34	Сыздыков	Syzdykov	13569	6474	7095
35	Касенов	Kasenov	13378	6314	7064
36	Исаев	Isayev	13281	6276	7005
37	Төлеген	Tölegen	13014	7097	5917
38	Қанат	Qanat	12532	6716	5816
39	Утегенов	Utegenov	12233	5832	6401
40	Муканов	Mukanov	12133	5664	6469
41	Амантай	Amantay	11979	6509	5470
42	Мусин	Musin	11912	5580	6332
43	Орынбасар	Orynbasar	11872	6358	5514
44	Касымов	Kasymov	11865	5518	6347
45	Рамазанов	Ramazanov	11800	5551	6249
46	Мукашев	Mukashev	11739	5440	6299
47	Ибрагимов	Ibragimov	11738	5412	6326
48	Муратов	Muratov	11730	5521	6209
49	Базарбаев	Bazarbayev	11693	5773	5920
50	Аскаров	Askarov	11631	5500	6131
51	Каримов		11529	5401	6128
52	Ержанов		11435	5320	6115
53	Жакупов		11371	5314	6057
54	Жусупов		11345	5299	6046
55	Рахимов		11214	5313	5901
56	Қуаныш		11134	5913	5221
57	Бауыржан		11133	5807	5326
58	Сериков		11119	5366	5753
59	Жұмабек		11091	5940	5151
60	Асан		11020	5884	5136
61	Жумабеков		11019	5171	5848
62	Ержан		11002	5948	5054
63	Рахметов		10942	5148	5794
64	Бақыт		10869	5696	5173
65	Аманжолов		10848	5204	5644
66	Абдуллаев		10836	5130	5706
67	Ильясов		10673	4983	5690
68	Шарипов		10663	4987	5676
69	Хасенов		10659	4997	5662
70	Жұмабай		10626	5813	4813
71	Оразбаев		10534	5015	5519
72	Базарбай		10519	5534	4985
73	Кенжебаев		10474	5019	5455
74	Кудайбергенов		10344	4909	5435
75	Нуржанов		10231	4767	5464
76	Мусаев		10170	4833	5337
77	Сапаров		10151	4884	5267
78	Аманжол		9916	5350	4566
79	Берік		9887	5258	4629
80	Сарсенов		9803	4588	5215
81	Кожахметов		9786	4578	5208
82	Ахмет		9753	5260	4493
83	Еркін		9474	5055	4419
84	Айтжанов		9452	4402	5050
85	Құдайберген		9423	5128	4295
86	Айтбаев		9213	4413	4800
87	Ахметжанов		9168	4304	4864
88	Бақытжан		9165	4823	4342
89	Мұхтар		9082	4921	4161
90	Абай		9066	4844	4222
91	Исмаилов		9030	4327	4703
92	Ермек		8816	4861	3955
93	Жумагалиев		8740	4142	4598
94	Мустафин		8710	3994	4716
95	Асылбек		8560	4440	4120
96	Усенов		8446	4014	4432
97	Юсупов		8420	3829	4591
98	Алтынбек		8400	4454	3946
99	Маратов		8385	4158	4227
100	Амиров		8375	3958	4417
101	Аманов		8348	4024	4324
102	Болатов		8231	4081	4150
103	Абенов		8147	3794	4353
104	Аманбаев		8105	3916	4189
105	Жумагулов		8054	3848	4206
106	Исмагулов		7951	3701	4250
107	Маханов		7891	3679	4212
108	Ерлан		7881	4112	3769
109	Садвакасов		7877	3603	4274
110	Бейсенов		7829	3715	4114
111	Қуандық		7713	4150	3563
112	Нұржан		7689	4018	3671
113	Нұрғали		7614	4033	3581
114	Балтабаев		7589	3714	3875
115	Умаров		7465	3453	4012
116	Болатбек		7416	3950	3466
117	Боранбаев		7399	3609	3790
118	Тажибаев		7315	3463	3852
119	Ергалиев		7267	3370	3897
120	Өмірзақ		7225	3905	3320
121	Балтабай		7219	3982	3237
122	Абилов		7217	3376	3841
123	Оразбай		7185	3833	3352
124	Ерболат		7175	3856	3319
125	Рахимжанов		7159	3344	3815
126	Исабеков		7148	3299	3849
127	Смаилов		7010	3296	3714
128	Ерғали		7002	3701	3301
129	Сариев		6992	3326	3666
130	Даулетов		6985	3356	3629
131	Бейсембаев		6984	3269	3715
132	Мухамеджанов		6980	3220	3760
133	Алибеков		6894	3289	3605
134	Махамбетов		6891	3241	3650
135	Алпысбаев		6885	3254	3631
136	Хамитов		6862	3315	3547
137	Курмангалиев		6819	3229	3590
138	Омар		6744	3579	3165
139	Орынбаев		6740	3246	3494
140	Муханов		6735	3198	3537
141	Мұратбек		6726	3598	3128
142	Бекенов		6720	3239	3481
143	Алтынбеков		6694	3217	3477
144	Алимбаев		6689	3219	3470
145	Байжанов		6630	3053	3577
146	Алдабергенов		6619	3109	3510
147	Мамбетов		6549	3202	3347
148	Альжанов		6534	3015	3519
149	Хамзин		6532	3083	3449
150	Асылбеков		6507	3015	3492
151	Абуов		6469	3072	3397
152	Иманбаев		6389	3020	3369
153	Сыдыков		6352	3100	3252
154	Дуйсенов		6317	2994	3323
155	Бижанов		6309	2930	3379
156	Жаксылыков		6261	3014	3247
157	Абдулла		6252	3365	2887
158	Амантаев		6227	3039	3188
159	Сұлтан		6225	3409	2816
160	Идрисов		6171	2853	3318
161	Бисенов		6152	2911	3241
162	Нурпеисов		6137	2855	3282
163	Назаров		6117	2885	3232
164	Жолдасов		6088	2931	3157
165	Оразов		6078	2959	3119
166	Жұмағали		6060	3303	2757
167	Ермеков		6055	2964	3091
168	Жанабаев		6042	2923	3119
169	Курманов		6013	2813	3200
170	Адилов		5996	2796	3200
171	Есенов		5995	2841	3154
172	Жуманов		5970	2890	3080
173	Рамазан		5962	3182	2780
174	Ербол		5962	3180	2782
175	Молдабеков		5947	2826	3121
176	Бекболат		5937	3204	2733
177	Мусабеков		5936	2804	3132
178	Оспан		5903	3190	2713
179	Кадыров		5890	2754	3136
180	Сарсембаев		5874	2765	3109
181	Уразбаев		5873	2810	3063
182	Сайлау		5846	3134	2712
183	Калдыбаев		5829	2788	3041
184	Орынбасаров		5817	2812	3005
185	Карибаев		5797	2664	3133
186	Наурызбаев		5776	2702	3074
187	Ибраимов		5763	2623	3140
188	Айтбай		5732	3047	2685
189	Оразбек		5731	3041	2690
190	Сағындық		5730	3099	2631
191	Әділбек		5716	3082	2634
192	Темірхан		5704	3059	2645
193	Избасаров		5666	2674	2992
194	Алпысбай		5664	2992	2672
195	Қалдыбай		5658	3026	2632
196	Жеңіс		5642	3040	2602
197	Кенжебеков		5632	2722	2910
198	Бахыт		5609	2901	2708
199	Жанат		5607	2973	2634
200	Алтаев		5599	2639	2960
201	Бейсенбаев		5593	2602	2991
202	Куандыков		5576	2651	2925
203	Карабаев		5531	2613	2918
204	Нурманов		5519	2635	2884
205	Әлібек		5519	2877	2642
206	Курманбаев		5518	2556	2962
207	Әділхан		5513	2947	2566
208	Қалдыбек		5510	2887	2623
209	Нурмагамбетов		5502	2602	2900
210	Дуйсенбаев		5496	2592	2904
211	Сансызбай		5470	3045	2425
212	Сатыбалды		5421	2934	2487
213	Имангалиев		5401	2471	2930
214	Аманбай		5389	2832	2557
215	Сатыбалдиев		5377	2625	2752
216	Кеңес		5362	2911	2451
217	Дюсембаев		5349	2541	2808
218	Самат		5346	2763	2583
219	Молдабаев		5346	2583	2763
220	Ермекбаев		5312	2523	2789
221	Кенжебек		5310	2775	2535
222	Умбетов		5305	2526	2779
223	Сапар		5302	2764	2538
224	Исабаев		5297	2518	2779
225	Тулебаев		5289	2569	2720
226	Аман		5283	2826	2457
227	Орынбай		5259	2754	2505
228	Бекжанов		5251	2494	2757
229	Үсен		5244	2824	2420
230	Нурбаев		5218	2457	2761
231	Тлеубаев		5206	2445	2761
232	Жумашев		5166	2424	2742
233	Мәлік		5165	2789	2376
234	Сарсенбай		5150	2730	2420
235	Қуанышбек		5114	2713	2401
236	Ашимов		5107	2432	2675
237	Жумадилов		5097	2374	2723
238	Сабитов		5071	2382	2689
239	Жолдыбаев		5054	2452	2602
240	Дүйсенбай		5044	2724	2320
241	Хасанов		5026	2339	2687
242	Касымбеков		4971	2309	2662
243	Оразбеков		4962	2414	2548
244	Қали		4938	2660	2278
245	Мухтаров		4893	2349	2544
246	Ибрагим		4862	2561	2301
247	Тұрсынбай		4860	2621	2239
248	Жолдас		4842	2593	2249
249	Казиев		4826	2267	2559
250	Елемесов		4817	2349	2468
251	Өмірбек		4815	2523	2292
252	Аманкелді		4805	2512	2293
253	Тұрсын		4772	2667	2105
254	Шаяхметов		4766	2315	2451
255	Сеитов		4763	2215	2548
256	Досанов		4716	2248	2468
257	Жуматаев		4715	2251	2464
258	Алибаев		4689	2190	2499
259	Батырбек		4644	2538	2106
260	Сембаев		4643	2222	2421
261	Утебаев		4634	2159	2475
262	Утепов		4623	2218	2405
263	Жарылқасын		4592	2349	2243
264	Габдуллин		4588	2099	2489
265	Куанышев		4584	2134	2450
266	Умирзаков		4577	2185	2392
267	Уалиев		4576	2130	2446
268	Касимов		4565	2094	2471
269	Боранбай		4532	2520	2012
270	Сагындыков		4531	2155	2376
271	Иманкулов		4493	2088	2405
272	Ақылбек		4479	2420	2059
273	Жаксыбаев		4461	2140	2321
274	Дюсенов		4461	2079	2382
275	Садуакасов		4457	2104	2353
276	Елубаев		4451	2151	2300
277	Турганбаев		4447	2089	2358
278	Кенжебай		4447	2366	2081
279	Батырхан		4443	2335	2108
280	Жаңабай		4439	2358	2081
281	Маликов		4435	2068	2367
282	Джумабаев		4433	2101	2332
283	Айдар		4430	2307	2123
284	Рысбеков		4415	2110	2305
285	Рысбек		4402	2404	1998
286	Абдрахман		4394	2317	2077
287	Есжанов		4390	2142	2248
288	Мурат		4339	2345	1994
289	Мусабаев		4337	2054	2283
290	Бахытжан		4334	2232	2102
291	Алдаберген		4324	2356	1968
292	Айдаров		4317	2096	2221
293	Смайлов		4311	2021	2290
294	Бахтияр		4305	2281	2024
295	Шакиров		4288	1983	2305
296	Омарбеков		4288	2009	2279
297	Бегалиев		4288	2034	2254
298	Есенбаев		4285	2096	2189
299	Уразов		4279	2046	2233
300	Алтай		4275	2256	2019
301	Сапарбаев		4261	2055	2206
302	Бакиров		4260	1949	2311
303	Махметов		4257	1998	2259
304	Темирбеков		4245	2011	2234
305	Мырзабеков		4244	2056	2188
306	Сапарбек		4242	2282	1960
307	Сабыр		4242	2306	1936
308	Дүйсен		4242	2235	2007
309	Досжанов		4240	2000	2240
310	Алимов		4228	1984	2244
311	Сәбит		4214	2266	1948
312	Имашев		4214	1958	2256
313	Өтеген		4213	2265	1948
314	Бақытбек		4208	2313	1895
315	Батырбеков		4203	1996	2207
316	Мухаметжанов		4197	1968	2229
317	Бейсенбай		4189	2239	1950
318	Ережепов		4184	2038	2146
319	Каратаев		4182	1986	2196
320	Ғалымжан		4181	2202	1979
321	Мейрамбек		4176	2221	1955
322	Нугманов		4166	1942	2224
323	Ералиев		4160	1941	2219
324	Мухамбетов		4147	2024	2123
325	Темирбаев		4143	1984	2159
326	Алимжанов		4132	1944	2188
327	Бейбіт		4120	2221	1899
328	Нурланов		4118	2031	2087
329	Қасым		4092	2233	1859
330	Оразалы		4087	2178	1909
331	Серіков		4084	2061	2023
332	Темиргалиев		4075	1959	2116
333	Алимбеков		4064	1914	2150
334	Сакенов		4056	1935	2121
335	Шалабаев		4041	1951	2090
336	Төлегенов		4037	2024	2013
337	Сүлеймен		4029	2226	1803
338	Тусупов		4027	1925	2102
339	Сейдахметов		4023	1854	2169
340	Сәрсенбай		4005	2118	1887
341	Темірбек		4002	2098	1904
342	Кадиров		3996	1893	2103
343	Тұрсынбек		3995	2127	1868
344	Сансызбаев		3994	1945	2049
345	Казбеков		3994	1885	2109
346	Шаймерденов		3980	1838	2142
347	Абдиев		3959	1887	2072
348	Толегенов		3953	1845	2108
349	Галиев		3952	1827	2125
350	Жұмахан		3945	2108	1837
351	Даутов		3940	1875	2065
352	Отарбаев		3933	1878	2055
353	Сабиров		3932	1861	2071
354	Жиенбаев		3924	1823	2101
355	Мырзабек		3921	2098	1823
356	Темиров		3916	1803	2113
357	Нұрланұлы		14698	6868	7830
358	Ниязов		3910	1818	2092
359	Рысбаев		3906	1869	2037
360	Нурбеков		3892	1835	2057
361	Баймагамбетов		3888	1850	2038
362	Елубай		3879	2093	1786
363	Тулеуов		3873	1804	2069
364	Айдарбеков		3868	1798	2070
365	Жолдыбай		3853	2085	1768
366	Курбанов		3839	1801	2038
367	Ермекбай		3834	2091	1743
368	Сарбасов		3807	1841	1966
369	Бейсен		3803	2024	1779
370	Байзаков		3799	1779	2020
371	Дүйсенбек		3796	1990	1806
372	Мукушев		3794	1781	2013
373	Аширбеков		3785	1800	1985
374	Мырзахметов		3783	1828	1955
375	Рахимбаев		3782	1752	2030
376	Шакенов		3780	1795	1985
377	Мырзабаев		3779	1813	1966
378	Асылхан		3771	1982	1789
379	Камалов		3759	1772	1987
380	Абдикаримов		3759	1815	1944
381	Баймуратов		3751	1761	1990
382	Оразалиев		3750	1803	1947
383	Узакбаев		3744	1875	1869
384	Мажитов		3743	1828	1915
385	Нұрлыбек		3736	1971	1765
386	Рустемов		3725	1739	1986
387	Ахмедов		3715	1776	1939
388	Елеусизов		3714	1768	1946
389	Султанбеков		3712	1745	1967
390	Арыстанов		3708	1765	1943
391	Дәулет		3700	2032	1668
392	Амангелдиев		3693	1865	1828
393	Даулетбаев		3691	1752	1939
394	Жапаров		3660	1787	1873
395	Хамит		3653	2046	1607
396	Есимов		3645	1695	1950
397	Ералы		3640	1988	1652
398	Нуртазин		3630	1672	1958
399	Орынбек		3626	1943	1683
400	Төрехан		3622	1968	1654
401	Абилдаев		3607	1766	1841
402	Жәнібек		3601	1923	1678
403	Айтжан		3601	1925	1676
404	Набиев		3600	1695	1905
405	Әділ		3595	1943	1652
406	Серікұлы		13620	6438	7182
407	Дарибаев		3587	1740	1847
408	Жомарт		3583	1868	1715
409	Сабит		3570	1880	1690
410	Иса		3567	1915	1652
411	Маханбетов		3565	1728	1837
412	Жунисов		3564	1680	1884
413	Кабиев		3558	1653	1905
414	Мұратов		3554	1742	1812
415	Бауржан		3546	1868	1678
416	Сайлаубек		3528	1921	1607
417	Абдраманов		3522	1698	1824
418	Молдахметов		3489	1643	1846
419	Кузембаев		3489	1698	1791
420	Аманкулов		3488	1595	1893
421	Бекбаев		3487	1658	1829
422	Мурзагалиев		3486	1626	1860
423	Канатов		3486	1682	1804
424	Сәкен		3484	1830	1654
425	Аханов		3483	1632	1851
426	Абжанов		3476	1636	1840
427	Ораз		3475	1847	1628
428	Базаров		3466	1673	1793
429	Нурахметов		3451	1633	1818
430	Нуртаев		3451	1616	1835
431	Турлыбеков		3442	1659	1783
432	Мадиев		3417	1579	1838
433	Турсынбаев		3395	1644	1751
434	Дуйсебаев		3395	1584	1811
435	Садық		3385	1833	1552
436	Сарыбаев		3376	1675	1701
437	Данияров		3374	1630	1744
438	Қыдырбай		3362	1830	1532
439	Кенжегалиев		3361	1544	1817
440	Жолдасбек		3342	1717	1625
441	Абаев		3341	1611	1730
442	Жақсыбай		3338	1791	1547
443	Исаков		3327	1571	1756
444	Мақсат		3322	1700	1622
445	Нурсеитов		3315	1596	1719
446	Қадыр		3315	1834	1481
447	Лесбек		3296	1722	1574
448	Жакенов		3293	1569	1724
449	Бектурганов		3285	1512	1773
450	Кыдырбаев		3284	1595	1689
451	Оралбай		3283	1787	1496
452	Еркінбек		3281	1735	1546
453	Ерназаров		3280	1565	1715
454	Нуралиев		3279	1561	1718
455	Жалғас		3266	1715	1551
456	Жалгасбаев		3264	1586	1678
457	Мустафаев		3262	1520	1742
458	Успанов		3257	1480	1777
459	Совет		3257	1784	1473
460	Кожанов		3253	1540	1713
461	Рахманов		3240	1518	1722
462	Ермагамбетов		3228	1518	1710
463	Нурмаганбетов		3225	1541	1684
464	Жұман		3223	1741	1482
465	Бисенбаев		3223	1576	1647
466	Кожабеков		3222	1518	1704
467	Нұрболат		3221	1667	1554
468	Абдуллин		3216	1449	1767
469	Бауыржанұлы		12218	5798	6420
470	Аманғали		3210	1776	1434
471	Тлегенов		3209	1556	1653
472	Хусаинов		3209	1517	1692
473	Айдарбек		3207	1761	1446
474	Нұралы		3201	1711	1490
475	Қазбек		3190	1740	1450
476	Сұлтанбек		3189	1715	1474
477	Ерланұлы		12416	6056	6360
478	Оралбаев		3172	1487	1685
479	Садуов		3170	1547	1623
480	Куанышбаев		3164	1563	1601
481	Қуанышбай		3163	1698	1465
482	Даулет		3155	1649	1506
483	Байменов		3145	1449	1696
484	Усманов		3128	1420	1708
485	Қайратұлы		12128	5872	6256
486	Утешов		3126	1470	1656
487	Кудабаев		3117	1479	1638
488	Есетов		3116	1474	1642
489	Серікбаев		3110	1544	1566
490	Серікқали		3109	1641	1468
491	Жамбыл		3094	1621	1473
492	Есен		3091	1690	1401
493	Керимбеков		3086	1471	1615
494	Бисенгалиев		3085	1432	1653
495	Алимбетов		3084	1423	1661
496	Бисембаев		3074	1389	1685
497	Сапарғали		3071	1643	1428
498	Анарбек		3063	1635	1428
499	Аязбаев		3062	1443	1619
500	Абиев		3062	1434	1628
501	Асқаров		3060	1521	1539
502	Исатаев		3059	1472	1587
503	Аманбек		3052	1637	1415
504	Бақтыбай		3049	1623	1426
505	Камбаров		3046	1430	1616
506	Ғалым		3041	1642	1399
507	Тажиев		3037	1451	1586
508	Умирбеков		3031	1432	1599
509	Максутов		3030	1464	1566
510	Джумагалиев		3028	1424	1604
511	Елемес		3025	1635	1390
512	Алимкулов		3025	1441	1584
513	Темирханов		3013	1460	1553
514	Мақсұт		3005	1620	1385
515	Амангалиев		3003	1468	1535
516	Сулейманов		3000	1398	1602
517	Пернебек		2999	1571	1428
518	Исмайлов		2997	1438	1559
519	Азаматұлы		11200	5222	5978
520	Баймуханов		2987	1393	1594
521	Хайруллин		2982	1382	1600
522	Гумаров		2978	1360	1618
523	Кушербаев		2977	1394	1583
524	Ануарбек		2977	1673	1304
525	Молдашев		2971	1440	1531
526	Сапарбай		2969	1580	1389
527	Айдархан		2965	1606	1359
528	Амирханов		2962	1319	1643
529	Полат		2959	1523	1436
530	Мырзахан		2954	1589	1365
531	Ғабит		2950	1600	1350
532	Адилбеков		2948	1409	1539
533	Исин		2944	1363	1581
534	Бекен		2942	1602	1340
535	Скаков		2941	1402	1539
536	Қуат		2938	1587	1351
537	Аширов		2934	1401	1533
538	Мынбаев		2933	1427	1506
539	Сартаев		2931	1415	1516
540	Джунусов		2928	1348	1580
541	Курмашев		2913	1381	1532
542	Габбасов		2910	1366	1544
543	Жанболат		2908	1526	1382
544	Асқарбек		2902	1537	1365
545	Сейтов		2891	1390	1501
546	Есенгелді		2890	1543	1347
547	Медетов		2882	1414	1468
548	Кульбаев		2872	1383	1489
549	Әмірхан		2870	1533	1337
550	Серик		2869	1553	1316
551	Сапаргалиев		2868	1360	1508
552	Русланұлы		10888	5152	5736
553	Аралбаев		2868	1369	1499
554	Наурызбай		2867	1555	1312
555	Куатов		2867	1355	1512
556	Иманбеков		2863	1376	1487
557	Елеуов		2862	1331	1531
558	Молдагалиев		2861	1314	1547
559	Булатов		2859	1339	1520
560	Ракишев		2858	1324	1534
561	Ермахан		2858	1502	1356
562	Муратбеков		2857	1363	1494
563	Керимбаев		2856	1253	1603
564	Еримбетов		2856	1342	1514
565	Абдраимов		2856	1342	1514
566	Сатаев		2854	1338	1516
567	Сейтжанов		2850	1373	1477
568	Тұрғанбек		2849	1548	1301
569	Тұрар		2845	1532	1313
570	Абдиров		2838	1368	1470
571	Батырханов		2835	1317	1518
572	Ертай		2834	1535	1299
573	Айткулов		2833	1298	1535
574	Жетписбаев		2832	1339	1493
575	Амренов		2829	1306	1523
576	Танатаров		2823	1390	1433
577	Талғатұлы		10812	5172	5640
578	Ұзақбай		2819	1519	1300
579	Тоқтасын		2818	1507	1311
580	Пернебай		2816	1523	1293
581	Құралбай		2812	1498	1314
582	Тулепов		2811	1312	1499
583	Усербаев		2803	1367	1436
584	Тулеубаев		2802	1324	1478
585	Жұматай		2796	1514	1282
586	Мұса		2794	1536	1258
587	Тастанбеков		2792	1324	1468
588	Жүсіп		2792	1518	1274
589	Қанатбек		2791	1428	1363
590	Давлетов		2787	1331	1456
591	Арынов		2785	1289	1496
592	Амангельдиев		2782	1321	1461
593	Қасымбек		2778	1494	1284
594	Қонысбай		2775	1507	1268
595	Оралбек		2770	1494	1276
596	Нұрмахан		2765	1428	1337
597	Сактаганов		2758	1276	1482
598	Онгарбаев		2757	1297	1460
599	Махмутов		2756	1311	1445
600	Ержанұлы		10542	5032	5510
601	Амандық		2755	1537	1218
602	Құрманғали		2748	1472	1276
603	Турсунов		2747	1340	1407
604	Бектасов		2743	1288	1455
605	Макашев		2738	1266	1472
606	Махамбет		2730	1496	1234
607	Тұрғанбай		2726	1489	1237
608	Тастанов		2719	1326	1393
609	Смағұл		2717	1549	1168
610	Нурлыбаев		2717	1278	1439
611	Жакипов		2716	1287	1429
612	Мейрам		2705	1462	1243
613	Тасболат		2698	1432	1266
614	Данияр		2698	1454	1244
615	Жақсылықов		2697	1321	1376
616	Акишев		2697	1242	1455
617	Салимов		2692	1266	1426
618	Сагимбаев		2692	1251	1441
619	Баймаханов		2692	1285	1407
620	Куспанов		2689	1265	1424
621	Бейсенбек		2682	1408	1274
622	Айдарханов		2681	1271	1410
623	Саматов		2676	1306	1370
624	Бақберген		2673	1409	1264
625	Ордабаев		2672	1269	1403
626	Қанатұлы		10208	4868	5340
627	Дауренбеков		2670	1258	1412
628	Бағдат		2668	1415	1253
629	Олжабаев		2667	1303	1364
630	Мырзабай		2664	1390	1274
631	Серикбай		2660	1428	1232
632	Ниязбеков		2660	1239	1421
633	Акылбеков		2655	1236	1419
634	Нурмуханов		2651	1258	1393
635	Кәрім		2650	1472	1178
636	Аяпов		2650	1272	1378
637	Нұртай		2649	1441	1208
638	Жақсыбек		2647	1397	1250
639	Азамат		2643	1386	1257
640	Каирбеков		2642	1326	1316
641	Адильбеков		2639	1232	1407
642	Абдукаримов		2638	1264	1374
643	Оразалин		2634	1227	1407
644	Амирбеков		2633	1262	1371
645	Какимов		2630	1246	1384
646	Арыстанбек		2628	1389	1239
647	Жолдасбаев		2624	1281	1343
648	Туребеков		2619	1308	1311
649	Жақып		2619	1459	1160
650	Маратұлы		10102	4870	5232
651	Жұмабаев		2616	1326	1290
652	Алмас		2611	1364	1247
653	Капаров		2610	1246	1364
654	Дулат		2606	1422	1184
655	Бекетов		2599	1218	1381
656	Сайлаубай		2593	1382	1211
657	Акимов		2592	1186	1406
658	Туякбаев		2587	1254	1333
659	Иманов		2587	1237	1350
660	Есенгалиев		2584	1139	1445
661	Кулбаев		2583	1245	1338
662	Тәңірберген		2582	1389	1193
663	Жанибеков		2580	1292	1288
664	Қайырбек		2577	1431	1146
665	Бактыбаев		2577	1260	1317
666	Махатов		2575	1207	1368
667	Төлеу		2571	1414	1157
668	Нұрбек		2564	1364	1200
669	Бекбосынов		2563	1193	1370
670	Рыскулов		2556	1198	1358
671	Сакен		2553	1349	1204
672	Қалиев		2550	1302	1248
673	Ескалиев		2550	1175	1375
674	Айнабеков		2550	1197	1353
675	Тулепбергенов		2549	1207	1342
676	Атабаев		2536	1214	1322
677	Ертаев		2531	1214	1317
678	Джумагулов		2529	1184	1345
679	Кенесов		2525	1257	1268
680	Калдыбеков		2525	1196	1329
681	Сарсенгалиев		2520	1188	1332
682	Бекишев		2517	1201	1316
683	Тусупбеков		2513	1189	1324
684	Елтай		2513	1357	1156
685	Ахметжан		2513	1361	1152
686	Қамбар		2506	1366	1140
687	Ерік		2505	1333	1172
688	Бахтияров		2505	1198	1307
689	Жалғасбай		2504	1332	1172
690	Сапарбеков		2503	1202	1301
691	Нурлан		2503	1275	1228
692	Жанаев		2499	1176	1323
693	Сейдалиев		2498	1151	1347
694	Сандыбаев		2497	1196	1301
695	Нысанбаев		2493	1201	1292
696	Рахматулла		2492	1291	1201
697	Маханбет		2490	1293	1197
698	Бухарбаев		2490	1195	1295
699	Утенов		2489	1209	1280
700	Мырзағали		2486	1305	1181
701	Құрманбек		2483	1281	1202
702	Есенбеков		2481	1190	1291
703	Уалихан		2479	1344	1135
704	Сексенбаев		2478	1234	1244
705	Кадырбаев		2478	1190	1288
706	Тагаев		2476	1228	1248
707	Валиев		2473	1109	1364
708	Рахат		2472	1292	1180
709	Төребек		2471	1338	1133
710	Қойшыбай		2471	1331	1140
711	Бекмуратов		2471	1163	1308
712	Бекмагамбетов		2468	1159	1309
713	Абдуалиев		2468	1187	1281
714	Асхат		2468	1277	1191
715	Раисов		2464	1145	1319
716	Ильяс		2464	1267	1197
717	Дюсенбаев		2462	1149	1313
718	Бердібек		2461	1274	1187
719	Утепбергенов		2458	1154	1304
720	Бегалы		2458	1316	1142
721	Таубаев		2456	1192	1264
722	Канафин		2456	1162	1294
723	Егембердиев		2455	1159	1296
724	Аяпбергенов		2451	1152	1299
725	Беков		2451	1165	1286
726	Худайбергенов		2450	1195	1255
727	Нурмаханов		2450	1147	1303
728	Ізбасар		2450	1334	1116
729	Закиров		2449	1143	1306
730	Джумабеков		2449	1183	1266
731	Бекболатов		2438	1117	1321
732	Абубакиров		2431	1160	1271
733	Ихсанов		2427	1093	1334
734	Алтыбаев		2424	1092	1332
735	Ахметкалиев		2422	1158	1264
736	Руслан		2421	1298	1123
737	Ғани		2418	1286	1132
738	Рыспаев		2410	1124	1286
739	Айткалиев		2410	1101	1309
740	Мухамадиев		2409	1140	1269
741	Кумаров		2408	1134	1274
742	Орал		2406	1318	1088
743	Рахимбеков		2404	1117	1287
744	Тулеген		2402	1297	1105
745	Сабыров		2402	1193	1209
746	Таңатар		2397	1282	1115
747	Туребаев		2396	1118	1278
748	Егизбаев		2392	1142	1250
749	Тулешов		2388	1157	1231
750	Төлепберген		2387	1309	1078
751	Орынбеков		2384	1187	1197
752	Нугуманов		2384	1089	1295
753	Бисенбай		2384	1302	1082
754	Умирбаев		2383	1144	1239
755	Кабылбеков		2380	1059	1321
756	Сисенов		2377	1151	1226
757	Курманбеков		2370	1131	1239
758	Байжуманов		2370	1091	1279
759	Орманов		2366	1112	1254
760	Куанов		2363	1109	1254
761	Балабеков		2360	1129	1231
762	Құдайбергенов		2359	1197	1162
763	Токсанбаев		2358	1155	1203
764	Жоламанов		2355	1100	1255
765	Досов		2354	1142	1212
766	Утеулиев		2351	1101	1250
767	Сағат		2348	1265	1083
768	Әмірбек		2347	1240	1107
769	Танирбергенов		2342	1134	1208
770	Бекжан		2341	1212	1129
771	Рысбай		2340	1222	1118
772	Ташенов		2333	1079	1254
773	Құрманғазы		2331	1282	1049
774	Сарманов		2330	1099	1231
775	Балгабаев		2327	1113	1214
776	Болатбеков		2326	1105	1221
777	Рахымжан		2324	1257	1067
778	Қожахмет		2322	1225	1097
779	Кенжетаев		2315	1119	1196
780	Болатхан		2314	1236	1078
781	Раимбеков		2311	1083	1228
782	Исатай		2310	1252	1058
783	Олжабай		2305	1324	981
784	Жұмаш		2305	1249	1056
785	Батыров		2305	1080	1225
786	Жетпісбай		2304	1226	1078
787	Ажибаев		2304	1110	1194
788	Ермаханов		2300	1118	1182
789	Алибек		2298	1165	1133
790	Нургазин		2293	1049	1244
791	Ерболұлы		8576	3990	4586
792	Манарбек		2292	1242	1050
793	Абдурахманов		2291	1136	1155
794	Жумажанов		2289	1101	1188
795	Исабек		2289	1191	1098
796	Умурзаков		2288	1106	1182
797	Уразгалиев		2288	1038	1250
798	Мухтар		2284	1119	1165
799	Сембай		2278	1261	1017
800	Сагиндыков		2274	1078	1196
801	Сундетов		2271	1071	1200
802	Мырзалиев		2268	1059	1209
803	Берікбай		2266	1182	1084
804	Садвокасов		2265	1033	1232
805	Абильдаев		2261	1006	1255
806	Тасбулатов		2258	1064	1194
807	Мырзахмет		2257	1236	1021
808	Арыстан		2257	1211	1046
809	Жүніс		2255	1161	1094
810	Базарбек		2255	1190	1065
811	Байбосынов		2253	1067	1186
812	Копбаев		2249	1007	1242
813	Жұмағұл		2247	1218	1029
814	Иманалиев		2247	1040	1207
815	Ищанов		2243	1071	1172
816	Сегизбаев		2239	1051	1188
817	Кусайнов		2239	1015	1224
818	Жарқынбек		2236	1159	1077
819	Туленов		2233	1037	1196
820	Таженов		2232	1050	1182
821	Аринов		2232	1048	1184
822	Мауленов		2228	1053	1175
823	Тлеуов		2226	1078	1148
824	Ахмадиев		2223	1021	1202
825	Карабеков		2219	1069	1150
826	Аширбаев		2218	1069	1149
827	Утемисов		2214	1072	1142
828	Есенбек		2212	1183	1029
829	Жандарбек		2209	1201	1008
830	Дощанов		2209	1034	1175
831	Бердибеков		2209	1037	1172
832	Жұмабеков		2205	1094	1111
833	Искалиев		2205	1074	1131
834	Ережеп		2202	1210	992
835	Усенбаев		2200	1064	1136
836	Жанузаков		2200	1046	1154
837	Рахым		2199	1162	1037
838	Али		2196	1173	1023
839	Ускенбаев		2195	1011	1184
840	Оразхан		2188	1187	1001
841	Еркебаев		2188	1071	1117
842	Исенов		2187	1034	1153
843	Артыкбаев		2186	1029	1157
844	Байболов		2184	1045	1139
845	Кеңесбек		2182	1156	1026
846	Мамаев		2180	1056	1124
847	Анарбаев		2180	1043	1137
848	Анарбай		2179	1137	1042
849	Султангалиев		2178	1052	1126
850	Сүлейменов		2174	1084	1090
851	Байдаулетов		2172	1030	1142
852	Жоламан		2171	1164	1007
853	Манапов		2170	1037	1133
854	Тоқтар		2168	1192	976
855	Байназаров		2168	999	1169
856	Уразалиев		2165	1036	1129
857	Ысқақ		2164	1172	992
858	Койшыбаев		2163	1109	1054
859	Сейлханов		2162	1036	1126
860	Назарбаев		2161	1047	1114
861	Мукажанов		2161	1033	1128
862	Есиркепов		2161	1034	1127
863	Мукатаев		2159	1015	1144
864	Бердалиев		2159	1034	1125
865	Конысбаев		2158	1009	1149
866	Керимкулов		2157	988	1169
867	Каракулов		2157	1031	1126
868	Жумаханов		2157	1049	1108
869	Ахметбеков		2157	1007	1150
870	Момбеков		2155	1046	1109
871	Аймагамбетов		2155	971	1184
872	Ергеш		2153	1129	1024
873	Бердибаев		2153	1078	1075
874	Байкенов		2152	987	1165
875	Жусипов		2151	1000	1151
876	Магзумов		2150	1021	1129
877	Оразғали		2148	1187	961
878	Есмагамбетов		2133	1025	1108
879	Есентаев		2133	995	1138
880	Қуатбек		2130	1115	1015
881	Нурпейсов		2129	974	1155
882	Агибаев		2129	962	1167
883	Кожабаев		2125	1014	1111
884	Раев		2124	995	1129
885	Аблаев		2124	1014	1110
886	Каиров		2121	1009	1112
887	Байсеитов		2120	995	1125
888	Акимжанов		2116	1017	1099
889	Муса		2112	1144	968
890	Нұрғазы		2107	1153	954
891	Нұржанұлы		8112	3904	4208
892	Арманұлы		7820	3616	4204
893	Хасен		2101	1156	945
894	Сабыржан		2101	1104	997
895	Баймбетов		2101	950	1151
896	Курбанбаев		2100	1031	1069
897	Жайлаубаев		2094	1037	1057
898	Кунанбаев		2092	1012	1080
899	Ибрашев		2092	975	1117
900	Кыстаубаев		2090	1018	1072
901	Мұхит		2088	1134	954
902	Ануарбеков		2088	1045	1043
903	Мусагалиев		2084	956	1128
904	Арман		2083	1040	1043
905	Тлеубергенов		2080	1003	1077
906	Акбаев		2074	942	1132
907	Нигметов		2070	970	1100
908	Есимбеков		2070	986	1084
909	Жаңбырбай		2066	1139	927
910	Бекеев		2065	992	1073
911	Жорабек		2058	1101	957
912	Әбілқасым		2058	1141	917
913	Жаканов		2058	980	1078
914	Аюпов		2058	948	1110
915	Амиржанов		2058	966	1092
916	Какенов		2056	981	1075
917	Налибаев		2055	972	1083
918	Акимбаев		2053	981	1072
919	Манап		2051	1119	932
920	Оразымбетов		2046	958	1088
921	Алдияров		2043	964	1079
922	Куралбаев		2041	986	1055
923	Даулбаев		2038	1010	1028
924	Асанбаев		2038	969	1069
925	Нұрлыбай		2035	1085	950
926	Калабаев		2033	973	1060
927	Сырлыбаев		2032	953	1079
928	Канаев		2032	963	1069
929	Камал		2029	1111	918
930	Мырзаханов		2024	987	1037
931	Мұратұлы		8082	4046	4036
932	Сатыбалдин		2016	979	1037
933	Жексенбай		2015	1087	928
934	Бекназаров		2014	929	1085
935	Сейтжан		2013	1075	938
936	Ташимов		2011	977	1034
937	Қасымхан		2010	1058	952
938	Жолдасбеков		2010	947	1063
939	Токтаров		2009	994	1015
940	Курманалиев		2009	919	1090
941	Ауелбеков		2009	972	1037
942	Серғазы		2008	1065	943
943	Айтбек		2008	1084	924
944	Газизов		2007	943	1064
945	Бексултанов		2005	944	1061
946	Қайыржан		2003	1128	875
947	Сержан		2002	1087	915
948	Жумабек		2002	1038	964
949	Амангельдинов		2002	1029	973
950	Аленов		1999	948	1051
951	Тұрлыбек		1997	1109	888
952	Капанов		1995	957	1038
953	Аманқос		1994	1048	946
954	Балтабеков		1988	988	1000
955	Жумабай		1982	1029	953
956	Берікұлы		7522	3558	3964
957	Ембергенов		1980	946	1034
958	Талипов		1977	947	1030
959	Қадырбек		1976	1031	945
960	Бақтияр		1976	1033	943
961	Сағынтай		1975	1042	933
962	Жолдасбай		1974	1042	932
963	Бектемиров		1973	905	1068
964	Нұрсұлтан		1970	1085	885
965	Қуанышұлы		7480	3542	3938
966	Абишов		1969	934	1035
967	Туяков		1965	935	1030
968	Бекбергенов		1964	931	1033
969	Абдрасилов		1964	934	1030
970	Бекбулатов		1962	912	1050
971	Ибадулла		1961	1026	935
972	Сәрсенбек		1956	989	967
973	Сагиев		1955	929	1026
974	Әшім		1955	1030	925
975	Тураров		1954	997	957
976	Оразаев		1953	938	1015
977	Рахман		1952	1053	899
978	Камзин		1952	897	1055
979	Амангельды		1952	1075	877
980	Сарин		1947	906	1041
981	Мырзагалиев		1947	933	1014
982	Әлімжан		1944	1046	898
983	Мұқан		1943	1067	876
984	Каленов		1941	933	1008
985	Ерманов		1940	908	1032
986	Көшербай		1937	1049	888
987	Булекбаев		1931	883	1048
988	Әмір		1927	1090	837
989	Нурмухамбетов		1926	900	1026
990	Калжанов		1924	922	1002
991	Ким		1922	665	1257
992	Азимбаев		1922	894	1028
993	Батырбаев		1917	939	978
994	Мереке		1916	1044	872
995	Мейрамов		1916	912	1004
996	Лукпанов		1916	898	1018
997	Сейткалиев		1915	905	1010
998	Сарсен		1912	1039	873
999	Кабулов		1912	904	1008
1000	Балғабай		1912	1064	848

== See also ==
- List of the most popular given names of Kazakh men of Kazakhstan
- List of the most popular given names of Kazakh women of Kazakhstan
