= Yavuz Şimşek =

Turkish footballer

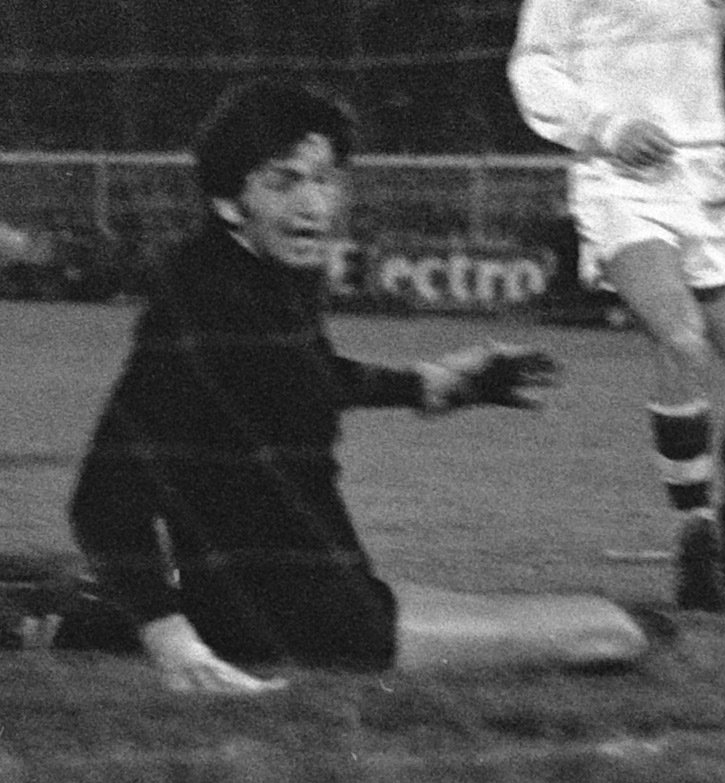
Yavuz Şimşek playing for Fenerbahçe in 1968

Yavuz Şimşek (born 1 April 1947 in Samsun) was a Turkish football player of Fenerbahçe between 1967–77 He played as a goalkeeper.

He started his professional career in Ankara with PTT Ankara (1965–67). Then he transferred to Fenerbahçe where he played ten years between 1967–77 and scored played 251 matches with them. He won 1967-68, 1969–70, 1973–74 and 1974-75 Turkish League.
