= Seneviratne =

- Gender: Unisex
- Language: Sinhala

Other names
- Variant form: Senewiratne

Seneviratne, Seneviratna or Senewiratne (Sinhala: සෙනෙවිරත්න) is a Sinhalese surname. Notable people with the surname include:

- Ana Seneviratne (1927–2015), Sri Lankan police officer
- Asanga Seneviratne (born 1965), Sri Lankan businessman and sportsman
- Athauda Seneviratne (1931–2022), Sri Lankan politician
- Chamani Seneviratne (born 1978), Sri Lankan cricketer
- Hector Vernon Ivan Seneviratne Corea, Sri Lankan Anglican priest
- Jayantha Seneviratne, Sri Lankan cricketer
- John Seneviratne (born 1941), Sri Lankan politician
- K. N. Seneviratne (1929–1986), Sri Lankan physician and academic
- Lakshman Senewiratne (born 1957), Sri Lankan politician
- Malinda Seneviratne (born 1965), Sri Lankan journalist
- Nalin Seneviratne (1931–2009), Sri Lankan army officer
- Nihal Seneviratne (1934–2026), Sri Lankan civil servant, secretary general of the Parliament of Sri Lanka (1981–1994)
- Ran Banda Seneviratne (died 2001), Sri Lankan lawyer and broadcaster
- Sonia I. Seneviratne, Swiss geophysicist
- W. I. M. Seneviratne (died 1996), Sri Lankan soldier
