= Bendemann =

Bendemann is a German surname. Notable people with the surname include:

- Eduard Bendemann (1811–1889), German painter
- Felix von Bendemann (1848–1915), German Imperial Navy admiral
- Rudolf Bendemann (1851–1884), German painter
