= Edirisinghe =

Edirisinghe is a Sinhalese name that may refer to the following people:

Surname

- Chamikara Edirisinghe (born 1991), Sri Lankan cricketer
- Lakshan Edirisinghe (born 1993), Sri Lankan cricketer
- Lilian Edirisinghe (1922–1993), Sri Lankan actress
- Lionel Edirisinghe (1913–1988), Sri Lankan musicologist
- Mercy Edirisinghe (1945/46–2014), Sri Lankan actress
- Sathischandra Edirisinghe (1941–2025), Sri Lankan actor
- Soma Edirisinghe (1939–2015), Sri Lankan corporate executive, film producer, philanthropist and social worker
- Sunil Edirisinghe (born 1949), Sri Lankan classical musician
- Vasu Bandu Edirisinghe (born 1970), Sri Lanka Air Force officer

Forename

== See also ==
- ETI Finance (Edirisinghe Trust Investments Finance Limited)
