= Nanayakkara =

Nanayakkara is a Sinhalese name derived from the Sanskrit language. It may refer to the following people:

Surname

- Adeesha Nanayakkara (born 1991), Sri Lankan cricketer
- Alwis Nanayakkara (born 1992), Sri Lankan cricketer
- Chandika Nanayakkara, Sri Lankan actor
- Charana Nanayakkara (born 1997), Sri Lankan cricketer
- D. R. Nanayakkara (1915–1989), Sri Lankan actor
- Hemakumara Nanayakkara, Sri Lankan politician
- Ishara Nanayakkara, Sri Lankan entrepreneur and businessman
- Kaumal Nanayakkara (born 1999), Sri Lankan cricketer
- Manusha Nanayakkara (born 1977), Sri Lankan politician
- Nanayakkara Atulugamage Stephen de Silva Jayasinghe (1911-1977), Sri Lankan Sinhala politician
- Nethalie Nanayakkara (born 1936), Sri Lankan actress
- Rohini Nanayakkara, retired bank executive from Sri Lanka
- S. D. F. C. Nanayakkara, 34th Surveyor General of Sri Lanka
- Sulara Nanayakkara, Sri Lankan violinist.
- Suranga Nanayakkara (born 1981), Sri Lankan born computer scientist and Inventor.
- Udaya Nanayakkara, Sri Lankan general and military engineer
- V. T. Nanayakkara (1902–?), Sri Lankan politician
- Vasudeva Nanayakkara (born 1939), Sri Lankan politician
- Wally Nanayakkara (1939–2003), Sri Lankan actor
- Yasapalitha Nanayakkara (1940–1996), Sri Lankan film director, screenwriter, producer, lyricist and actor
