= Ohayon =

Ohayon is a surname. Notable people with the surname include:

- Almog Ohayon (born 1994), Israeli footballer
- Amandine Ohayon, CEO of Pronovias, a wedding dress design business in Spain
- Ayelet Ohayon (born 1974), three-time Olympian Israeli foil fencer
- Haviv Ohayon (born 1998), Israeli footballer
- Henry Ohayon (1934–2023), Israeli cyclist
- Jonathan Ohayon (born 1972), athlete from Canada, grandson of writer Joseph Liss
- Matan Ohayon, retired Israeli footballer
- Michèle Ohayon (born 1968), film director, screenwriter and producer
- Moshe Ohayon (born 1983), Israeli former professional football midfielder
- Shimon Ohayon (born 1945), Israeli politician, professor at Bar-Ilan University
- Yogev Ohayon (born 1987), Israeli professional basketball player
