= Thach (surname) =

Thach is a surname. Notable people with the surname include:

- John Thach (1905–1981), American World War II Naval Aviator, air combat tactician, and United States Navy admiral
- Robert Thach (1866–1924), American golfer
