= Ohana (surname) =

Ohana (Hebrew: אוחנה) is a Hebrew-language surname. There are two suggested origins of this and similar Jewish-Berber surnames. One of them suggests that it means "son of Hanna". Another suggests it is from an occupation related to growing or trading henna.

- Amir Ohana (born 1976), Israeli politician
- Asher Ohana (born 1945), Israeli civil servant
- Cláudia Ohana (born 1963), Brazilian actress
- Eli Ohana (born 1964), Israeli footballer and football coach
- Esther Ohana (died 1983), the first Israeli killed by Palestinian stone-throwing
- Maurice Ohana (1913–1992), Anglo-French composer
- Michael Ohana (born 1995), Israeli footballer
- Shirley Ohana (born 1983), Israeli footballer
- Tal Ohana (fl. 2010s), mayor of Yeruham, Israel
