= R. P. A. Ranaweera Pathirana =

Sri Lankan politician

Hon. R. P. A. Ranaweera Pathirana MP

Member of Parliament for Anuradhapura District
- In office 2004–2010

Personal details
- Party: Janatha Vimukthi Peramuna

R. P. A. Ranaweera Pathirana is a Sri Lankan politician and a former member of the Parliament of Sri Lanka.
