= Nur 'Ali =

Nur 'Ali (Azerbaijani: Nurəli; Kazakh: Нұрғали, romanized: Nurğalï; Persian: نورعلی, romanized: nur'ali; Tatar: Нургали, romanized: Nurğäli; Turkmen: Nuraly; meaning 'Light of Ali') is a Muslim male given name also used in surnames (Azerbaijani: Nurəliyev; Kazakh: Нұрғалиев, romanized: Nurğalïev, Tatar: Нургалиев, romanized: Nurğäliev; Turkmen: Nuralyýew).

== Given name ==
- Nur Ali Elahi
- Nur-Ali Khalifa
- Nur-Ali Shushtari
- Nuraly Alip
- Nuraly Khan
- Nurali Yusifbayli
- Nureli Abbas
- Noer Alie (1914–1992), Indonesian politician

== Surname ==
- Gözel Nuralyýewa
- Azat Nurghaliyev
- Bolat Nurghaliyev
