= Matsumoto (surname) =

Origin
- Language: Japanese
- Meaning: base of the pine tree

Matsumoto (written: 松本 lit. "base of the pine tree") is the 15th most common Japanese surname. A less common variant is 松元.

== Notable people with the surname ==
- Akiko Matsumoto (松本 明子; born 1966), Japanese television personality and actress
- Ayaka Matsumoto (松本 亜弥華; born 1988), Japanese volleyball player
- Cazuo Matsumoto (born 1985), Brazilian table tennis player
- Chieko Matsumoto (松本ちえこ; 1959–2019), Japanese idol, singer and actress
- Chizuo Matsumoto (松本 智津夫; 1955–2018), better known as Shoko Asahara, Japanese cult leader and founder of Aum Shinrikyo
- Dai Matsumoto (松本 大; born 1959), Japanese voice actor
- Daiju Matsumoto (松本 大樹; born 1977), Japanese footballer
- Daiki Matsumoto (松本 大輝; born 1991), Japanese footballer
- Daisuke Matsumoto (politician) (松本 大輔; born 1971), Japanese politician
- David Matsumoto (born 1959), American psychologist, writer and judoka
- Eiichi Matsumoto (松本 栄一; 1915–2004), Japanese photographer
- Elisabetta Matsumoto, American physicist
- Fumiaki Matsumoto (松本 文明; born 1949), Japanese politician
- Gaku Matsumoto (松本 岳; born 1993), Japanese actor
- George Matsumoto (1922–2016), American architect and educator
- Go Matsumoto (松本 剛; born 1993), Japanese baseball player
- Gyoji Matsumoto (松本 暁司; 1934–2019), Japanese footballer
- H. Matsumoto, Japanese set decorator
- Hajime Matsumoto (松本 哉; born 1974), Japanese activist
- Matsumoto Hakuō I (初代 松本 白鸚; 1910–1982), Japanese kabuki actor
- Matsumoto Hakuō II (ニ代目 松本 白鸚; born 1942), Japanese kabuki actor
- Haruna Matsumoto (松本 遥奈; born 1993), Japanese snowboarder
- Hidehiko Matsumoto (松本 英彦; 1926–2000), Japanese jazz saxophonist and bandleader
- Hideto Matsumoto (松本 秀人; 1964–1998), better known as hide, Japanese musician
- Hideya Matsumoto (英也, 松本), Japanese mathematician
- Hiroka Matsumoto (松本 紘佳; born 1995), Japanese violinist
- Hiroko Matsumoto (松本 裕子; 1936–2003), Japanese model
- Hiroshi Matsumoto (engineer) (松本 紘; 1942–2025), Japanese engineer and atmospheric scientist
- Hiroya Matsumoto (松本 寛也; born 1986), Japanese actor
- Hiroya Matsumoto (footballer) (松本 大弥; born 2000), Japanese footballer
- Hiroyo Matsumoto (松本 浩代; born 1985), Japanese professional wrestler
- Hiroyuki Matsumoto (松本 浩幸; born 1989), Japanese footballer
- Hisato Matsumoto (松本 尚人; born 1984), Japanese swimmer
- Hitoshi Matsumoto (松本 人志; born 1963), Japanese comedian
- Matsumoto Ichiyō (松本 一洋; 1893–1952), Japanese painter
- Ibuki Matsumoto (松本伊吹), Japanese snowboarder
- Ikuo Matsumoto (松本 育夫; born 1941), Japanese footballer and manager
- Iyo Matsumoto (松本 伊代; born 1965), Japanese idol, singer, actress and television personality
- Izumi Matsumoto (まつもと 泉; 1958-2020), Japanese manga artist
- Jiichirō Matsumoto (松本 治一郎; 1887–1966), Japanese politician and businessman
- Jiro Matsumoto (松本 次郎; born 1970), Japanese manga artist
- Jōji Matsumoto (松本 烝治; 1877–1954), Japanese legal scholar and politician
- Jon Matsumoto (born 1986), Canadian ice hockey player
- Jun Matsumoto (松本 潤; born 1983), Japanese singer and actor
- Jun Matsumoto (politician) (松本 純; 1950–2026), Japanese politician
- Matsumoto Jun (physician) (松本 順; 1832–1907), Japanese physician
- Kaori Matsumoto (松本 薫; born 1987), Japanese judoka
- Kaoru Matsumoto (松本 香; born 1960), better known as Dump Matsumoto, Japanese professional wrestler
- Katsuaki Matsumoto (松本 勝明; 1928-2021), Japanese cyclist
- Katsuhiro Matsumoto (松元 克央; born 1997), Japanese swimmer
- Katsuji Matsumoto (松本 かつぢ; 1904–1986), Japanese illustrator and manga artist
- Matsumoto Kazu (松本 和; 1860–1940), Imperial Japanese Navy admiral
- Kazuhiko Matsumoto (松本 和彦), Japanese adult video director
- Keiji Matsumoto (松本 恵二; 1949–2015), Japanese racing driver
- Keijiro Matsumoto (松本 啓二朗; born 1986), Japanese baseball player
- Keisuke Matsumoto (松本 圭介; born 1988), Japanese footballer
- Kenjiro Matsumoto (松本 健次郎; born 1943), Japanese swimmer
- Kiyo A. Matsumoto (born 1955), American judge
- Kodai Matsumoto (松本 幸大; born 1980), Japanese baseball player
- Kohei Matsumoto (松本 孝平; born 1989), Japanese footballer
- Kohei Matsumoto (松本 孝平; born 1994), Japanese footballer
- Kohji Matsumoto (松本 耕二), Japanese mathematician
- Kōjirō Matsumoto (松本 孝次郎; 1870–1932), Japanese educationist
- Matsumoto Kōshirō VII (七代目 松本 幸四郎; 1870–1949), Japanese kabuki actor
- Matsumoto Kōshirō X (十代目 松本 幸四郎; born 1973), Japanese kabuki actor
- Lauren Matsumoto (born 1987), American politician and beauty pageant winner
- Leiji Matsumoto (松本 零士; 1938–2023), Japanese manga artist
- Lisa Matsumoto (1964–2007), American playwright
- Marika Matsumoto (松本 まりか; born 1984), Japanese actress
- Mark Matsumoto, American engineer
- Matsumoto Masanobu, Japanese swordsman
- Masaya Matsumoto (松本 昌也; born 1995), Japanese footballer
- Matatarō Matsumoto (松本 亦太郎; 1865–1943), Japanese psychologist
- Mayu Matsumoto (松本 麻佑; born 1995), Japanese badminton player
- Megumi Matsumoto (松元 恵; born 1977), Japanese voice actress
- Michiko Matsumoto (松本 路子; born 1950), Japanese photographer
- Miku Matsumoto (松本 未来; born 1981), Japanese mixed martial artist
- Mitsuo Matsumoto (born 1971), Japanese mixed martial artist
- Miwa Matsumoto (松本 美和; born 1971), Japanese voice actress
- Miyako Matsumoto (松本 都; born 1985), Japanese professional wrestler and actress
- Nagi Matsumoto (松本 凪生; born 2001), Japanese footballer
- Namika Matsumoto (松本 潮霞; born 1992), Japanese weightlifter
- Naoko Matsumoto, Japanese archaeologist
- Naomi Matsumoto (softball) (松本 直美; born 1968), Japanese softball player
- Naomichi Matsumoto (松本 直通; born 1961), Japanese physician and geneticist
- Nina Matsumoto (born 1984), Canadian cartoonist
- Norihiko Matsumoto (松本 徳彦; born 1936), Japanese photographer
- Nozomu Matsumoto (松本 望; 1905–1988), Japanese businessman and inventor
- Rei Matsumoto (松本 怜; born 1988), Japanese footballer
- Rie Matsumoto (松本 理恵; born 1985), Japanese anime director
- Rica Matsumoto (松本 梨香; born 1968), Japanese actress, voice actress and singer
- Rio Matsumoto (松本 莉緒; born 1982), Japanese actress, model and singer
- Roy Matsumoto (1914–2014), United States Army soldier
- Ryota Matsumoto (松本 怜大; born 1990), Japanese footballer
- Ryota Matsumoto (松本 良多), Japanese artist
- Ryu Matsumoto (松本 龍; 1951–2018), Japanese politician
- Ryūtarō Matsumoto (松本 隆太郎; born 1986), Japanese sport wrestler
- Ryuya Matsumoto (松本 竜也; born 1993), Japanese baseball player
- Sachi Matsumoto (松本 さち; born 1973), Japanese voice actress
- Sara Matsumoto (松本 沙羅; born 1992), Japanese voice actress
- Sayaka Matsumoto (born 1982), American judoka
- Seichō Matsumoto (松本 清張; 1909–1992), Japanese writer
- Shigeharu Matsumoto (松本 重治; 1899–1989), Japanese journalist
- Shingo Matsumoto (松本 慎吾; born 1978), Japanese sport wrestler
- Shinjiro Matsumoto (松本 真二郎), victim in Fukuoka family murder case, where Wei Wei was convicted and executed
- Sho Matsumoto (松本 翔; born 1992), Japanese footballer
- Shuna Matsumoto (松本 珠奈; born 1985), Japanese association football coach
- Shunichi Matsumoto (松本 俊一; 1897–1987), Japanese diplomat
- Shunsuke Matsumoto (松本 竣介; 1912–1948), Japanese painter
- Taishi Matsumoto (松本 泰志; born 1998), Japanese footballer
- Taiyō Matsumoto (松本 大洋; born 1967), Japanese manga artist
- Takahiro Matsumoto (松本 孝弘; born 1961), better known as Tak Matsumoto, Japanese musician
- Takashi Matsumoto (lyricist) (松本 隆; born 1949), Japanese lyricist and musician
- Takashi Matsumoto (poet) (松本 たかし; 1906–1956), Japanese poet
- Takatoshi Matsumoto (松本 昂聡; born 1983), Japanese footballer
- Takeaki Matsumoto (松本 剛明; born 1959), Japanese politician
- Takehisa Matsumoto (松本 武久; born 1980), Japanese Go player
- Takuya Matsumoto (松本 拓也; born 1989), Japanese footballer
- Tamaki Matsumoto (松元 環季; born 1999), Japanese voice actress and actress
- Temari Matsumoto (松本 テマリ), Japanese manga artist and illustrator
- Tetsuya Matsumoto (松本 哲也; born 1984), Japanese baseball player
- Tomo Matsumoto (マツモト トモ), Japanese manga artist
- Tortoise Matsumoto (born 1966), Japanese musician
- Tōru Matsumoto (松本徹) (born 1977), Japanese badminton player
- Toshio Matsumoto (松本 俊夫; 1932–2017), Japanese film director
- Toshio Matsumoto (dancer) (松本 利夫; born 1975), Japanese dancer and actor
- Ukyo Matsumoto (松本 享恭; born 1994), Japanese actor
- Wakana Matsumoto (松本 若菜; born 1984), Japanese actress
- Yasushi Matsumoto (松本 安司; born 1969), Japanese footballer
- Yasunori Matsumoto (松本 保典; born 1960), Japanese actor and voice actor
- Yayoi Matsumoto (松本 弥生; born 1990), Japanese swimmer
- Yohei Matsumoto (松本 洋平; born 1973), Japanese politician
- Yoshihiko Matsumoto (松本 慶彦; born 1981), Japanese volleyball player
- Yoshiyuki Matsumoto (松本 佳介; born 1971), Japanese shogi player
- Yuichi Matsumoto (松元 ユウイチ; born 1980), Brazilian baseball player
- Yuji Matsumoto (松本 裕治), Japanese information scientist
- Yuki Matsumoto (松本 祐樹; born 1989), Japanese footballer
- Yukihiro Matsumoto (まつもと ゆきひろ; born 1965), Japanese computer scientist, software programmer, writer and creator of the Ruby programming language
- Yukino Matsumoto (松本 雪乃; born 1970), Japanese table tennis player

== Fictional characters ==
- Asami Matsumoto (松本 朝海), a character in the manga series Nana
- Kiyonaga Matsumoto (松本 清長), a character in the manga series Case Closed
- Rangiku Matsumoto (松本 乱菊), a character in the manga series Bleach
