= Naoko =

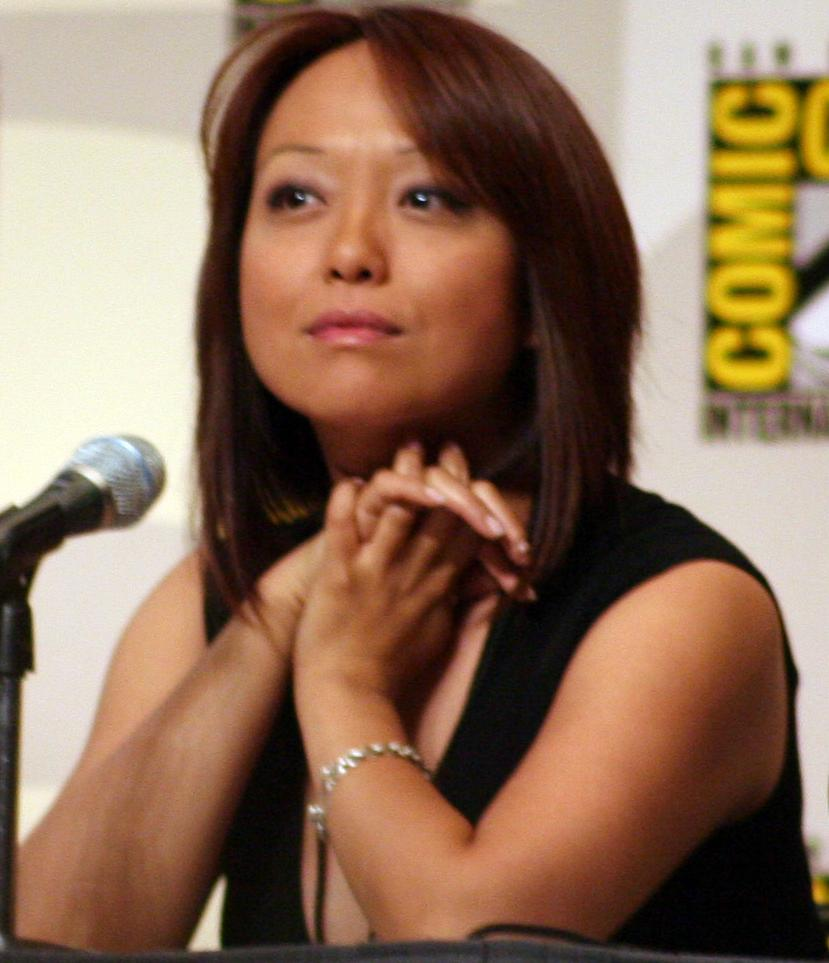
- Naoko Mori, a Japanese actress
- Gender: Female

Origin
- Origin: Japanese
- Meaning: many different meanings depending on the kanji used.

Other names
- Related names: Nao; Naomi

Naoko (なおこ, ナオコ) is a feminine Japanese given name which is occasionally spelled Nahoko (なほこ, ナホコ).

== Written forms ==
Naoko can be written using different kanji characters and can mean:

- 直子, "obedient, child"
- 尚子, "esteem, child"
- 奈緒子, "Nara, cord, child"
- 菜緒子, "greens, cord, child"
- 奈央子, "Nara, center, child"
- 菜穂子, "greens, ear (of grain), child"
- 奈保子, "Nara, keep, child"
- 奈生子, "Nara, fresh, child"

The name can also be written in hiragana or katakana.

== People with the name ==
- Naoko Fujioka (藤岡 奈穂子; born 1975), Japanese former professional boxer
- Naoko Fukatsu (深津 尚子; born 1944), Japanese tennis table player
- Naoko Fukuman (福万 尚子; born 1992), Japanese badminton player
- Naoko Funayama (船山 直子), Japanese American sportscaster
- Naoko Gushima (具島 直子; born 1969), Japanese singer-songwriter
- Naoko Hashimoto (橋本 直子; born 1984), Japanese volleyball player
- Naoko Hayashiba (林葉 直子; born 1968), Japanese writer, manga artist and former women's professional shogi player
- Naoko Iijima (飯島 直子; born 1968), Japanese television and film actress and a former gravure idol
- Naoko Imoto (井本 直歩子; born 1976), Japanese former freestyle swimmer
- Naoko Ishihara (石原 奈央子; born 1974), Japanese sports shooter
- Naoko Kamata (鎌田 奈緒子; born 1983), Japanese former sailor
- Naoko Kamio (神尾 直子; born 1967), Japanese suit actress
- Naoko Kawai (河合 奈保子; born 1963), Japanese former pop idol, singer-songwriter, and composer
- Naoko Kawakami (川上 直子; born 1977), Japanese former football player
- Naoko Kawashima (川嶋 奈緒子; born 1981), Japanese synchronized swimmer
- Naoko Ken (研 ナオコ; born 1953), Japanese singer and actress
- Naoko Kijimuta (雉子牟田 直子; born 1972), Japanese retired tennis player
- Naoko Kodama (コダマ ナオコ), Japanese manga artist
- Naoko Kouda (幸田 直子; born 1959), Japanese voice actress
- Naoko Kumagai (熊谷 直子; born 1971), Japanese female kickboxer
- Naoko Kume (久米 直子; born 1963), Japanese swimmer
- Naoko Kurahashi Neilson, American astrophysicist and neutrino astronomer
- Naoko Kurotsuka (黒塚 直子; born 1959), Japanese artist
- Naoko Masuda (增田 尚子), Japanese former taijiquan athlete
- Naoko Matsubara (松原 直子; born 1937), Japanese-Canadian print-maker
- Naoko Matsui (松井 菜桜子; born 1961), Japanese voice actress and narrator
- Naoko Matsumoto (松本 直子; born 1968), Japanese Professor in the Department of Archaeology
- Naoko Miura (三浦 直子; born 1959), Japanese former swimmer
- Naoko Mori (森 尚子; born 1971), Japanese actress
- Naoko Moto (もと なお), Japanese manga artist
- Naoko Nishigai (西貝 尚子; born 1969), Japanese former football player
- Naoko Nozawa (野沢 直子; born 1963), Japanese comedian and musician
- Naoko Ogigami (荻上 直子; born 1972), Japanese film director, screenwriter, and cinematographer
- Naoko Otani (大谷 直子; born 1950), Japanese actress
- Naoko Sahara (佐原 奈生子; born 1996), Japanese female handball player
- Naoko Saito (齋藤 尚子; born 1976), Japanese field hockey player
- Naoko Sakamoto (runner) (坂本 直子; born 1980), Japanese long-distance runner
- Naoko Sakamoto (softball) (坂本 直子; born 1985), Japanese softball player
- Naoko Sakurai (born 1953), Japanese equestrian
- Naoko Sato (佐藤 直子; born 1955), Japanese retired professional tennis player
- Naoko Sawamatsu (沢松 奈生子; born 1973), Japanese former professional tennis player
- Naoko Shibusawa (born 1964), Japanese Associate Professor of History
- Naoko Shimazu (ナオコ シマズ), Japanese Professor of History
- Naoko Shinoda (篠田 奈保子; born 1972), Japanese politician and lawyer
- Naoko Suzuki (鈴木 奈穂子; born 1982), Japanese news anchor and television personality
- Naoko Takahashi (高橋 尚子; born 1972), Japanese retired long-distance runner
- Naoko Takemoto (竹本 尚子; born 1955), Japanese chess player
- Naoko Takeuchi (武内 直子; born 1967), Japanese manga artist
- Naoko Terai (寺井 尚子; born 1967), Japanese jazz violinist
- Naoko Tosa (土佐 尚子; born 1961), Japanese media artist
- Naoko Watanabe (actress) (渡辺 奈緒子; born 1984), Japanese actress and model
- Naoko Watanabe (voice actress) (渡辺 菜生子; born 1959), Japanese voice actress
- Naoko Yabuta (薮田 尚子; born 1979), known as Orie Kimoto, Japanese actress and voice actress
- Naoko Yamada (山田 尚子), Japanese animator and director
- Naoko Yamano (山野 直子; born 1960), Japanese musician of the Japanese rock trio Shonen Knife
- Naoko Yamazaki (山崎 直子; born 1970), Japanese engineer and former astronaut
- Nahoko Hishiyama (菱山 南帆子; born 1989), Japanese feminist, constitutional protection activist, and anti-war activist
- Nahoko Kinoshita (木下 菜穂子; born 1980), Japanese actress and voice actress
- Nahoko Kojima (小島 奈保子; born 1981), Japanese paper cut artist
- Nahoko Takada (高田 なほ子; 1905–1991), Japanese educator, trade unionist, politician, socialist and peace activist
- Nahoko Uehashi (上橋 菜穂子; born 1962), Japanese writer

== Fictional characters ==
- Naoko, a character in the anime series Bubblegum Crisis
- Naoko (直子), a character in the novel Norwegian Wood by Haruki Murakami
- Naoko, a character in The Revenge of Shinobi (The Super Shinobi)
- Naoko Akagi (ナオコ), minor character in the anime series Neon Genesis Evangelion
- Naoko Kamikishiro (直子), character in the light novel and manga Boogiepop and Others
- Naoko Kawamata, character in the film, The Grudge 3
- Naoko Satomi, a main character in the film The Wind Rises
- Naoko Yamada (奈緒子), the main heroine of the Japanese TV drama series Trick
- Naoko Yanagisawa (奈緒子), character in the anime and manga series Cardcaptor Sakura
- Naoko Yasutani, a main character of the novel A Tale for the Time Being by Ruth Ozeki
