= Naoto =

- Gender: Male

Origin
- Origin: Japanese
- Meaning: It can have many different meanings depending on the kanji used.

Other names
- Related names: Nao; Naoya; Naoki; Naohito

Naoto (なおと, ナオト) is a male Japanese given name. It is most commonly used for males.

== Written forms ==
Naoto can be written using different kanji characters and can mean:

- 直人, "honesty, person"
- 尚人, "esteem, person"
- 直登, "honesty, ascend"
- 尚登, "esteem, ascend"
- 直斗, "honesty, Big Dipper"
- 猶人, "easy-going/graceful, person"

The name can also be written in hiragana or katakana.

== People with the name ==
- Naoto (猶人), bass guitarist of the Japanese band Exist Trace
- Naoto Ando (安藤 由翔; born 1991), Japanese footballer
- Naoto Arai (新井 直人; born 1996), Japanese footballer
- Naoto Baba (馬場 直人; born 1996), Japanese cross-country skier
- Naoto Chino (知野 直人; born 1999), Japanese baseball player
- Naoto Fukasawa (深澤 直人; born 1956), Japanese designer, author and educator
- Naoto Hasegawa (長谷川 直人; born 1996), Japanese high jumper
- Naoto Hayasaka (早坂 尚人; born 1995), Japanese artistic gymnast
- Naoto Hikosaka (彦坂 直人; born 1962), Japanese professional Go player
- Naoto Hiraishi (平石 直人; born 1992), Japanese footballer
- Naoto Hirooka (廣岡 直人; born 1977), Japanese imaginations-related fashion designer
- Naoto Hiroyama (廣山 直人; born 1983), Japanese guitarist and headman of the J-rock band Orange Range
- Naoto Inada (稲田 直人; born 1979), Japanese retired professional infielder
- Naoto Itō (伊藤 直人; born 1969), Japanese ski jumper
- Naoto Kamifukumoto (上福元 直人; born 1989), Japanese footballer
- Naoto Kataoka (片岡 直人; born 1983), Japanese dancer, actor, rapper and creative director
- Naoto Kine (木根 尚登; born 1957), Japanese guitarist of the Japanese band TM NETWORK
- Naoto Kojima (小島 直人; born 1978), Japanese mixed martial artist
- Naoto Matsukura (松倉 直人; born 1993), Japanese radio-controlled car racer
- Naoto Matsuo (松尾 直人; born 1979), Japanese former football player
- Naoto Miki (三木 直土; born 2001), Japanese professional footballer
- Naoto Minegishi (峰岸 直人; born 1950), Japanese water polo player
- Naoto Misawa (三沢 直人; born 1995), Japanese football player
- Naoto Nakamura (中村 直人; born 1979), Japanese singer-songwriter and composer
- Naoto Nakamura (rugby union) (中村 直人; born 1969), Japanese former rugby union player
- Naoto Nishida (西田 直斗; born 1993), Japanese professional baseball player
- Naoto Nishiguchi (西口 直人; born 1996), Japanese professional baseball pitcher
- Naoto Ogata (緒形 直人; born 1967), Japanese actor
- Naoto Ohshima (大島 直人; born 1964), Japanese video game designer and artist
- Naoto Okazaki (岡崎 直人; born 1969), Japanese fencer
- Naoto Oku (於久 直人; born 1971), Japanese archer
- Naoto Otake (大嶽 直人; born 1968), Japanese former football player and manager
- Naoto Ōtani (大谷 直人; born 1952), Japanese lawyer
- Naoto Sago (佐合 尚人; born 1992), Japanese karateka
- Naoto Saitō (斉藤 直人; born 1997), Japanese rugby union player
- Naoto Sakurai (桜井 直人; born 1975), Japanese former football player
- Naoto Satō (佐藤 直人; born 1953), Japanese astronomer
- Naoto Sawai (澤井 直人; born 1995), Japanese professional footballer
- Naoto Shibata (柴田 直人; born 1958), Japanese bass guitarist of the Japanese band Anthem
- Naoto Suenaga (末永 直登; born 1976), Japanese professional drifting driver
- Naoto Tajima (田島 直人; 1912–1990), Japanese athlete and gold medalist
- Naoto Takenaka (竹中 直人; born 1956), Japanese actor, comedian, singer and director
- Naoto Tobe (戸邉 直人; born 1992), Japanese high jumper
- Naoto Tsuji (辻 直人; born 1989), Japanese professional basketball player
- Naoto Tsuru (鶴 直人; born 1987), Japanese former professional baseball pitcher
- Naoto Ueno (上野 直人; born 1964), Japanese Director of the University of Hawaiʻi (Mānoa) Cancer Center
- Naoto Watanabe (渡辺 直人; born 1980), Japanese former professional baseball infielder
- Naoto Yoshii (吉井 直人; born 1987), Japanese former footballer

== Fictional characters ==
- Naoto Date (直人), the protagonist of the manga and anime series Tiger Mask
- Naoto Fuyumine (直人), one of the main characters in the Dogs: Bullets & Carnage series
- Naoto Kirihara (直人), the main character in the J-drama Night Head and Night Head Genesis anime
- Naoto Kurogane (ナオト), a supporting character in the BlazBlue video game series
- Naoto Sho (直人), the main hero of the Japanese tokusatsu series Gridman the Hyper Agent
- Naoto Shirogane (直斗), one of the main characters in the video game Persona 4
- Naoto Kōzuki (直人), a minor character from the anime Code Geass
- Naoto Takayama (高山 直人), the main protagonist of the manga and anime series Rail Wars!
- Naoto Takizawa, the sixth ranger of the Super Sentai season "Mirai Sentai Timeranger"
- Naoto Tamura, the protagonist of the Metal Hero season "Kidou Keiji Jiban"
- Naoto Miura (見浦ナオト), one of the main characters of the manga and anime series Clockwork Planet
- Naoto Hachiouji (八王子 直人), one of the two main characters of the manga and anime series "Don't Toy with Me, Miss Nagatoro"
- Naoto Tachibana, one of three main characters of "Tokyo Revengers"

== See also ==
- H. Naoto (born 1978), Japanese fashion brand
- 6025 Naotosato, a Main-belt Asteroid
- Naota, the main character of FLCL
