= Naoko (disambiguation) =

Naoko is a feminine Japanese given name.

Naoko may also refer to:

- Diana Loginova, a Russian singer performing under the stage name Naoko
- Naoko, a 2007 film starring Juri Ueno
- Naoko (novel), the English title of the 1999 novel Himitsu by Keigo Higashino
- 14925 Naoko, a main-belt asteroid
