= Kunii =

Kunii (written: 国井 or 國井) is a Japanese surname. Notable people with the surname include:

- Mao Kunii (国井 麻緒, Kunii Mao, born 1996), Japaneses group rhythmic gymnast
- Yuki Kunii (國井 勇輝, Kunii Yūki, born 2003), Japanese motorcycle racer
- Zenya Kunii (国井善弥, Kunii Zenya, 1894–1966), Japanese martial artist.
