= List of Uninhabited Planet Survive! episodes =

Uninhabited Planet Survive! is a 2003 Japanese anime television series which aired in Japan on NHK from October 16, 2003, to October 28, 2004. It was a 52-episode series, plus 3 specials, produced by Telecom Animation Film and Madhouse Production.

== Episode list ==
All episode titles are lines of dialogue spoken in each of them.

No.	Title	Directed by	Written by	Animation supervisor	Original release date
1	"Transfer Student, Luna!"; Transliteration: "Tenkousei, Runa Desu!" (Japanese: 転校生, ルナです!)	Yasunaga Tsuji	Written by : Shōji Yonemura; Storyboarded by : Yūichirō Yano	Keiko Nakaji	October 16, 2003
In a brief flashback, the main character Luna is shown as a young girl being pushed into an escape capsule by her father, who is then killed in an explosion. Several years later, Luna is preparing for her first day at a school she is transferring into. Upon entering the grounds, she is stopped and scolded by the student council president Menori for running on the pavement, but quickly befriends a kinder girl named Sharla. On their way to class, the girls run into a student named Howard and his gang taunting an older boy from Pluto named Bell, telling him to clean their shoes better. Luna attempts to intervene, only to be told that Bell in fact wants to clean their shoes. At the start of class, Luna is introduced, as is another recent transfer student named Shingo. The teacher discusses a field trip coming up, meant to give the students experience in planetary settling, and some of Earth's late history is revealed. During gym class, Luna, Sharla and another student named Kaoru play Air Basketball against Howard and two others. Luna scores with some help from Kaoru, despite Howard playing rough. On the way home, Shingo nearly hits the girls on a gasoline-powered scooter he has built. While discussing the scooter, they hear Howard and his gang starting a fight with Kaoru. Luna tries to stop the fight, but a member of Howard's gang accidentally starts a fire. Howard and his gang retreats, but Sharla is trapped by the fire.
2	"Evasion is Impossible!?"; Transliteration: "Kaihi wa Fukanou!?" (Japanese: 回避は不可能!?)	Yasunaga Tsuji	Written by : Shōji Yonemura; Storyboarded by : Kazuhide Tomonaga	Sawako Miyamoto	October 23, 2003
Luna tries to help Sharla, but ends up getting trapped by the fire as well. Shingo tries to save them in a construction vehicle, while Kaoru helps from the shadows by throwing them a line. They manage to escape, but the incident has been kept out of the media because of Howard's father's influence. A week later, Chako, Luna's robot pet, sneaks into her backpack as she heads for the shuttle to depart on the class's field trip. Before boarding the shuttle, Menori announces the groups into which the class has been divided, with Luna being grouped with Menori, Sharla, Bell, Howard, Shingo, and Kaoru. The shuttle runs into an unusually strong gravity storm, and the captain orders the passengers into escape shuttles as a precaution while they perform an emergency warp to escape it. Howard and Shingo excitedly sit in the pilot seats, but as the shuttle begins to warp, someone's hand inadvertently hits the release button of their group's shuttle, leaving the shuttle and the seven children behind in the gravity storm as the main ship warps away.
3	"The Real Wind, The Real Sea"; Transliteration: "Honmono no Kaze, Honmono no Umi" (Japanese: ほんものの風, ほんものの海)	Nobuo Tomizawa	Written by : Shōji Yonemura; Storyboarded by : Nobuo Tomizawa	Yūko Sobu	October 30, 2003
The shuttle is sucked into the gravity storm, and thrown out of the far end, in an unknown location far from the colony. The children struggle with the ship's unhelpful computer system to determine their position, and it announces that they have entered the gravity well of a planet. As the children theorize on what planet it might be, Chako emerges from Luna's backpack. With the shuttle's autopilot system damaged in the storm, Chako connects to the computer and guides Luna – who has previous experience flying an escape shuttle – through the procedures to land the ship. The ship is struck by lightning on the way down, and crash-lands into an ocean, coming to rest on a large rock. The next morning, as the children emerge from the shuttle to look around, they are surprised to see real clouds, a real ocean, and a real sun. Chako tells them that the atmosphere is similar to Earth's, though not exactly the same. As the children search the shuttle for supplies, Shingo finds a small inflatable life raft, and Menori and Howard decide to row towards nearby land to scout. On their way, they are attacked by a large snake-like sea monster.
4	"What's Going to Happen to Us?"; Transliteration: "Watashitachi, Dou natchau no!" (Japanese: 私たち, どうなっちゃうの!)	Yasunaga Tsuji	Written by : Shōji Yonemura; Storyboarded by : Kazuhide Tomonaga	Takeshi Baba	November 13, 2003
Menori and Howard try to row back to the shuttle, but the sea monster catches up with them. The monster destroys the boat, but Menori and Howard manage to get back to the shuttle. The children hide inside the shuttle until the monster loses interest and leaves. After waiting some time for the tide to rise, the children emerge and try to push the shuttle lose from the rocks where it is caught so that they can float it to land on the ocean currents. They almost push it free, but the sea monster returns. The children quickly hide inside the shuttle, but this time the monster is more persistent, ramming the shuttle repeatedly and eventually forcing the hatch open. It nearly catches Bell in its jaws, but Kaoru throws a knife at its eye and the monster retreats. The force of the snake pulling its head out of the shuttle lifts it off the rocks, and the shuttle slowly floats towards land. The wounded monster returns once more, but by then the shuttle has entered water too shallow for it to follow. The children tie the shuttle to a tree so that it cannot float away again, and spend the night in the shuttle. Early the next morning, the ground shakes from what sounds like large footsteps.
5	"Sharla, You Can't Give Up!"; Transliteration: "Shāra, Makecha Dame!" (Japanese: シャアラ, 負けちゃダメ!)	Keiko Oyamada	Written by : Yoshifumi Fukushima; Storyboarded by : Nobuo Tomizawa	Sawako Miyamoto	November 20, 2003
The children hear the sounds of a large creature outside the shuttle, and Sharla catches a glimpse of it out the window, causing her to start crying hysterically. The creature bashes the shuttle repeatedly, but after making no progress, seems to lose interest and leaves. In the morning, they find a large footprint in the shuttle's hull, and Chako estimates its height to be around ten meters. Chako deems the shuttle's flight systems useless, but Shingo says he might be able to fix the communications system. They take inventory of what they have with them, and then split up to search for food and water along the beach, with Shingo and Chako staying behind to look at the communications system. Luna tries to cheer Sharla up, but she's very shaken over the recent events, and depressed with their situation in general. Luna and Sharla find some fruit, but a strange carnivorous pitcher plant catches them in its vine-like tentacles. Hearing Sharla scream, Bell and Kaoru come to their rescue, and destroy the plant's pitcher. Shingo doesn't have much success with the communications system and Chako is low on power. The group returns to the shuttle for the night and eat the fruit that Luna, Sharla, Bell, and Kaoru bring back, and Chako uses it to recharge her fuel cell.
6	"We're Not Playing a Game"; Transliteration: "Bokura wa Gēmu wo Shiteru n ja nai" (Japanese: 僕らはゲームをしてるんじゃない)	Yasunaga Tsuji	Written by : Takeshi Mochizuki; Storyboarded by : Kazuhide Tomonaga	Yūko Sobu	November 27, 2003
The next day, the children set out again to find food and water, this time with Shingo and Chako going as well. Kaoru is told to go with Shingo and Chako, but is reluctant, and eventually goes off on his own after finding some fruit. At the beach, he finds some obsidian. Bell and Sharla attempt to start a fire, first trying to get a spark from rocks, and then by spinning a stick with their hands. Bell tries until his hands are blistered and bleeding, but insists that he must continue, despite Sharla's pleading. Luna, Menori, and Howard head into the forest. First chasing after a small kangaroo-like creature, they then encounter a giant lizard that chases after them instead. They get away at first, but lose their bearings. While trying to find their way, they find a large fresh water lake, but the lizard catches up with them. The three climb up a very large tree to avoid it, but it is soon scared off by loud thumping footsteps. As the source of the footsteps emerges from the forest, it is revealed to be an elephantine creature with a long prehensile tongue that tries to reach the leaves of the big tree to eat, but it cannot. Howard gets frightened and screams, scaring the creature away. Menori and Luna resolve to climb a small mountain in the distance to re-establish their bearings, even though it will mean they won't make it back to the shuttle by nightfall, and Howard follows.
7	"We've Only Just Started Walking"; Transliteration: "Mada Aruki Hajimeta Bakari" (Japanese: まだ歩き始めたばかり)	Yasunaga Tsuji	Written by : Takeshi Mochizuki; Storyboarded by : Nobuo Tomizawa	Takeshi Baba	December 4, 2003
Kaoru fashions the obsidian he found into a crude spear which he uses to catch a fish. Chako and Shingo collect worms for bait and build simple fishing rods, but don't have much luck catching fish without hooks. Bell and Sharla continue their attempts to build a fire together, and Sharla eventually succeeds shortly before sunset due to her lighter touch and faster hands, despite both of them rubbing their palms raw. The group is concerned that Luna, Menori, and Howard have not returned, and vow to search for them at sunrise. They are also impressed at the obsidian knife and spear-head that Kaoru made, but he insists that the others should make their own. When Bell reveals that the fish should be cleaned and gutted before eating, something that Kaoru didn't know, he realizes that they all need to work together, and makes more knives, and a fishing hook out of bone for Shingo and Chako. The next day, after spending a night in a small cave, Luna, Menori, and Howard reach the top of the mountain, and discover that they are on an island. Despite being at first depressed that there are no people in sight, they are able to find their bearings again. After drawing a map of the island, they return to the lake for more water, then set off for the shuttle again, meeting up with the other children who have started searching for them.
8	"What's Important in Order to Live"; Transliteration: "Ikiru tame ni Taisetsu na Koto" (Japanese: 生きるために大切なこと)	Keiko Oyamada	Written by : Shōji Yonemura; Storyboarded by : Kazuhide Tomonaga	Masaya Yasutome	December 11, 2003
The children now have sources of food and water, but the three-hour round trip to the lake takes up too much time and energy every day, and their only means of carrying water are the plastic bottles from the shuttle's emergency rations, which don't hold much water. Bell and Shingo come up with the idea of digging a pit and filling it with water, using their deflated life raft – which washed up on the beach during the night – to hold and carry the water. After digging the pit, the children head towards the lake, on the way encountering the small kangaroo-like creature from earlier. Sharla finds it cute, and calls it a tobihane, from the verb meaning "to hop" (飛び跳ねる, tobihaneru), but she is horrified when the others want to catch it for food. They reach the lake, which Sharla names "Fairy Lake", and stop to rest. When Howard pushes Luna into the lake, she suddenly feels a strange sensation, and is briefly surrounded by a pink glow. After they find fruit on the trees and fish in the lake, Shingo suggests the idea of building a house in the big tree, which Sharla names "Magnificent Tree" (大いなる木, Ooinaru Ki). As the children inspect the tree, Menori realizes that the footprints left by the elephantine creature they'd encountered earlier were the same as the footprints left in the shuttle's hull after their first night on land. They decide the area around the tree is simply too dangerous, and head back to the beach with the raft filled with water. On the way back, Shingo slips and accidentally spills some water, and Menori's overly strict admonishment is questioned by Luna. After a few days in which the group is largely unsuccessful at finding food, Bell, Howard and Menori are able to catch the tobihane in a pit trap. Despite Sharla's protestations, the tobihane's leg was injured in the process, meaning it would never survive even if they set it free, and Bell butchers it so that they can eat. That night, as the children eat the tobihane in a somber mood, Sharla tells Bell that she hates him, and runs off. Luna follows Sharla and convinces her to see Bell's point of view, and they return to the fire together. In place of Menori's increasingly ineffective leadership, the children elect Luna as the group's new leader.
9	"Surely We Can Live Together Amicably"; Transliteration: "Kitto Nakayoku Kuraseru" (Japanese: きっと仲良く暮らせる)	Yasunaga Tsuji	Written by : Shōji Yonemura; Storyboarded by : Nobuo Tomizawa	Kenji Hachizaki	December 18, 2003
Long days of little food followed by long nights of little sleep in the shuttle's seats are beginning to take their toll on the children, who are starting to get irritable and snappish with one another. Luna once again raises the idea of moving to Fairy Lake, building a house in the Magnificent Tree to keep it out of reach of the giant lizard. The children survey the tree, leaving Kaoru behind to tend the fire, who makes saws from panels scavenged from the shuttle. Chako, Shingo and Howard measure the tree for size and strength. When they return to the shuttle, Howard takes a small branch of the Magnificent Tree with him as a souvenir. Shingo and Chako spend the night drawing up plans for a house. The next day, the children – sans Howard, left behind to tend the fire and catch fish for dinner – find straight, sturdy trees and vines to construct the foundation of the house. Dismayed by the amount of effort required, and despite some mishaps, the group manages to complete the foundation. Bored of not being able to catch any fish, Howard comes to see how they are going, but when he climbs the tree to test the foundation, the whole structure collapses. Disheartened, they return to the shuttle – only to find that it too has been destroyed, and their fire has gone out.
10	"Let's Build a House"; Transliteration: "Ie wo Tsukurou" (Japanese: 家をつくろう)	Yukio Okazaki	Written by : Takeshi Mochizuki; Storyboarded by : Kazuhide Tomonaga	Tsutomu Murakami	December 25, 2003
In the destroyed shuttle, Menori finds her violin undamaged in one of the storage lockers. Luna sees the large creature's footprints leading away. Bell manages to re-start the fire from the remaining embers, and the children spend the night in a nearby cave. Luna decides that their only remaining option is to build a house in the Magnificent Tree after all. She comes up with the idea of using the shuttle's broken-off wings for the house's foundation and floor, but Menori quickly points out that the wings simply too heavy for them to move. However, Shingo comes up with ideas for some of the smaller components, such as making pulleys, or using a porthole for a window. The children return to the lake and start to search for more building materials and food, but while Luna is tying a pulley to a branch the huge creature returns, in a frenzy. Luna falls onto its back, and it runs into the lake. Suddenly, she starts to glow pink, and sees the creature's memory of Howard's Magnificent Tree branch, which he'd brought back to the shuttle the previous day, lying in the shuttle's open hatchway. She realizes the creature had been injured trying to reach the branch, and finds a piece of the shuttle sticking out of the side of its neck – when she pulls it out, the creature calms and starts to eat leaves. However, Howard, returning with fish, sees it and screams in terror, which frightens the creature away. That night, Luna tries to persuade the others that the creature is just a gentle herbivore, but they can only see the danger it presents. Howard derisively suggests having the creature pull the shuttle's wings, which excites Luna, until she sees the horrified expressions on everyone else's faces. The next day, Luna and Sharla are attacked by the giant lizard, but Sharla's scream brings the creature, which frightens the lizard off. The event was witnessed by all of the other children as well, and they decide to trust the creature. They get the creature to haul the shuttle's wings to the lake, and up into the tree. Sharla names it "Pague", and they see it off into the forest that evening feeling as though they had gained a new friend.
11	"Gentle Melody"; Transliteration: "Yasashii Merodi" (Japanese: 優しいメロディ)	Masatoshi Adashino	Written by : Shōji Yonemura; Storyboarded by : Toshiyuki Shimazu	Keiko Nakaji	January 8, 2004
The children, with Pague's help, rip some of the remaining bulkhead panels off the shuttle to use on the house, while Menori stands to one side directing their efforts. As they start to lift the panels onto a cart for Pague to haul to Fairy Lake, Howard protests that Menori is standing doing nothing. Luna asks Menori to pitch in, but on helping to lift the first panel, she cuts her finger. As she spaces out, Bell fashions a bandage from a strip of Sharla's handkerchief. She has a flashback to a memory of her mother taking away her pain when she injured her finger as a child, then a memory of her mother's funeral, with a voice-over from her father commanding her to always hide her emotions from other people. Sharla and Shingo attempt to cheer her up, but she brushes them off. Back at the Magnificent Tree, while Pague lifts the panels up to the house, Menori goes to find food. Following a bird, she finds a cliff which has birds' nests filled with eggs. However, as she starts to climb, she hurts her cut finger, and instead spends the day standing in the sea, spacing out. That night, as the others sleep, Menori sits with her feet in the lake, playing her violin, remembering what her mother told her about how she could always feel Menori's heart through her violin playing. Luna, also awake, sits down with her feet in the lake as well. Suddenly, with a pink glow, she sees Menori's memories. She tells Menori that she doesn't need to rely on her violin – she can open up to her friends. The next day, with her mother's, father's and Luna's words in her mind, she manages to climb the cliff and gather a large number of eggs for everyone to eat.
12	"Everyone's House"; Transliteration: "Minna no Ie" (Japanese: みんなの家)	Yasunaga Tsuji	Written by : Yoshifumi Fukushima; Storyboarded by : Nobuo Tomizawa	Sawako Miyamoto	January 15, 2004
As children put some finishing touches on their house, Howard emerges from the forest, leading Bell, who is bowed under the weight of one of the shuttle's seats, intended for Howard's exclusive use. Luna protests that if Howard wants the seat, he should carry it himself. They declare the house almost complete, lacking only a front door, until Menori suggests a shower. Meanwhile, Kaoru works at narrowing a river with rocks to force the fish into a smaller area, but still finds them difficult to catch with his spear. While the other children collect wood to construct a shower room and leaves for shower curtains, Bell and Luna attack a pitcher plant, using logs to occupy the tentacle vines. They miss one, which catches Luna. Bell saves Luna, but berates himself for missing it. Luna tells him to have more confidence in himself. They return with the pitcher to use as a tank for the shower. That night, as Bell muses by the fire, Sharla comes to remind him of all the good things he's done for them. The next day, Kaoru and Bell find a stand of bamboo – Kaoru uses some to build a fish trap, while Bell brings some back to the house for plumbing in the shower room. Howard refuses to work, insisting on taking a day off, but the rest of the children build the shower room. Dozing on his chair, Howard loses his balance and falls forwards, dropping into the lake – chair and all. Howard blames Bell for not securing the chair properly, but Bell refuses to get a new chair. Howard retaliates by filling the shower's tank with mud, but when Bell stands up to him and calls him out on it, he winds up falling through the shower room, getting covered with the muddy water. He runs off in anger, while the children repair and restore the shower room. Later, Bell goes to find Howard, and brings him back. Howard has the first shower, and afterwards, the children have a party to celebrate the completion of "Everyone's House" (as newly named by Sharla).
13	"You Are Not Alone"; Transliteration: "Hitori Ja Nai" (Japanese: ひとりじゃない)	Sang-Il Sim	Written by : Takeshi Mochizuki; Storyboarded by : Kazuhide Tomonaga	Ki-Duk Park	January 22, 2004
Two weeks later, the children have returned their efforts to food-gathering, but they find they've already picked the nearby trees clean of fruit. They decide to go further afield the next day, but all are concerned about Kaoru's habit of doing his own thing. The following day, Bell, Luna and Chako find potatoes, while Kaoru and Sharla check the fish trap, but find it empty. Kaoru walks away to hunt on his own, but Sharla turns back to see fish swim into the trap. Kaoru arrives to dinner late, having caught a small lizard while hunting. Later that night, Luna brings Kaoru dinner as he sharpens his knife in the cleaning area, and she tells him that he doesn't have to act alone – they're stronger if they work together. The next day, Bell and Shingo plow a field to plant potatoes, Menori and Howard move the fence line, and Sharla and Chako hang fish out to dry. However, Kaoru's uneaten dinner from the previous night attracts the giant lizard. The children retreat into the house as the lizard starts to eat their fish. Just then, Kaoru returns from hunting, and attacks it. Kaoru's arm gets badly scratched, and Luna runs out to distract the lizard so that Kaoru can get to the house. When Kaoru dismisses Luna's concerns because he was only risking himself, she gets angry with him, and tells him to treasure his life. The children concoct a plan to get rid of the lizard, but in the process of carrying it out, both the lizard and Shingo fall into the lake. Luna dives in to distract the lizard from Shingo, and she suddenly hears a strange voice telling her to grab a spear floating near her. She and Kaoru – jumping from the tree – spear the lizard together and kill it. That night, as Kaoru joins the others for dinner, Luna tells them about the voice she heard.
14	"I Heard a Voice"; Transliteration: "Koe ga Kikoeta" (Japanese: 声が聞こえた)	Yasunaga Tsuji	Written by : Shōji Yonemura; Storyboarded by : Nobuo Tomizawa	Kenji Hachizaki	January 29, 2004
After stopping work for the day, Luna goes to wash her hands in the lake. As she remembers the other times she saw strange visions while in the lake, she suddenly sees a vision showing a journey down a river into the Eastern Forest, and a voice telling her to come. That night, she tells the others about her desire to go there, and Howard and Bell volunteer to join her. Bell and Luna build a raft out of bamboo, while Howard makes a bow. Shingo and Menori are working the field, until Shingo suddenly collapses. They leave him to rest in the shade of the Magnificent Tree, and he sits starting at a photo of his family. Luna, Bell and Howard set off down the river. The journey is largely uneventful, until they encounter a waterfall. The raft breaks up, throwing them into the river. As Luna tries to hold onto her father's backpack, both she and Bell get swept over the waterfall. Bell manages to pull Luna and her backpack to shore, while Howard climbs down a rope. The trio are surprised to see that everything in the forest is huge – plants, insects and animals. They are attacked by a giant boar, but the Luna hears the mysterious voice, which saves them. They find a cave in which to spend the night. Meanwhile, back at the house, Shingo, looking listless, retrieves the communications device from the shuttle. Menori goes with him, concerned about his well-being.
15	"A Forest Where Everything is Big"; Transliteration: "Nani mo Kamo ga Ooki na Mori" (Japanese: 何もかもが大きな森)	Yasunaga Tsuji	Written by : Yoshifumi Fukushima; Storyboarded by : Kazuhide Tomonaga	Takeshi Baba	February 5, 2004
As Luna, Bell and Howard head deeper into the Eastern Forest, Shingo works on the communication system back at the house, but is frustrated that he doesn't have enough parts. Shingo and Chako return to the shuttle for more parts, but Shingo gets angry at Chako's dismissive attitude. Later, he tries to operate the communications device using Chako as a power supply, but is unsuccessful. Meanwhile, as Luna, Bell and Howard get deeper into the forest, Luna starts to hear the voice more often. They also find they can jump much higher than usual. Eventually, they encounter some sort of overgrown ruin. Luna's head starts hurting and she suddenly sees an image of an alien family. As the trio approaches the ruin, a giant crustacean suddenly emerges from the water surrounding it. It chases Howard, but gets crushed under a boulder. Howard grabs a piece of one leg as a trophy, but a second crustacean attacks. They flee back to the cliff they climbed down. Pague, who had come to visit the house, suddenly becomes agitated and runs away, followed by Kaoru and Menori. They reach the cliff above the Eastern Forest just in time to pull Luna, Bell and Howard out of reach of the crustacean. That evening, they discuss their findings. Howard presents his trophy, but throws it away in disgust when slime comes out of it. Chako discovers a strange machine in the slime.
16	"I Want to Go Home, Too"; Transliteration: "Boku Datte Kaeritai n da" (Japanese: 僕だって帰りたいんだ)	Yukio Okazaki	Written by : Takeshi Mochizuki; Storyboarded by : Toshiyuki Shimazu	Tsutomu Murakami	February 12, 2004
Chako and Shingo investigate the machine, and determine it to be a nano-plant – a collection of nanomachines – that was controlling the crustacean. They realize the nano-plant means there is intelligent life somewhere on the planet. Shingo announces that he might be able to use the nano-plant to fix the communications system, but Howard assumes that Shingo is guaranteed to be successful and gets excited. Despite working all night, Shingo isn't finished by the next morning – Howard, however, continues with his unreasonable expectations. Howard and Shingo get into a heated argument, which ends with Shingo storming off. Luna comes to the conclusion that Shingo is homesick – being two years younger than the rest of the children, he feels it much worse. Things come to a head when Howard teases Shingo because he was crying for his parents in his sleep. Shingo runs away in tears, and the rest of the children berate Howard. They search the forest for Shingo, eventually finding him in the shuttle. They send Howard to make amends, and he does so by standing on the shoreline and shouting for his parents. The other children join in, except for Kaoru, who is embarrassed by Chako before he can. That night, Shingo finally fixes the communications system, and a voice comes from the speakers. The children become excited, until Luna reveals that it was the same voice that she'd been hearing in her mind.
17	"There's Always a Blue Sky in Your Heart"; Transliteration: "Kokoro wa Itsumo Aozora" (Japanese: 心はいつも青空)	Keiichirō Furuya	Written by : Shōji Yonemura; Storyboarded by : Nobuo Tomizawa	Sawako Miyamoto	February 19, 2004
The children are forced to put their plans to re-visit the ruins on hold when Luna develops a high fever. On Chako's advice, they split up to search for medicinal foods and plants for her – Chako and Sharla look for an arrowroot-analogue, Bell and Shingo look for mugwort, Kaoru goes to get eggs, Howard looks for fruit, and Menori remains behind to take care of Luna. The hunt for arrowroot is difficult, worsened by the arrival of bad weather, but Sharla insists on continuing, even after badly scraping her knee. Sharla wants to be strong for Luna, so Chako tells her the story of her first meeting with Luna, shortly after her mother died. Chako tells Sharla the secret of Luna's strength – to remember that even when bad things come, there's always a blue sky in your heart. The children all return with their foods and plants, and they give them to Luna. That night, while watching over Luna, Sharla tells Chako about how meeting Luna enabled her to open up for the first time, but Luna was awake and heard the whole thing. Chako finds that Luna is much better, and the girls all walk out to watch the sunrise.
18	"This is the Eastern Forest!?"; Transliteration: "Kore ga Higashi no Mori!?" (Japanese: これが東の森!?)	Yasunaga Tsuji	Written by : Yoshifumi Fukushima; Storyboarded by : Kazuhide Tomonaga	Yūko Sobu	February 26, 2004
Shingo, impatient with the delay in plans to investigate the ruins, sneaks out early one morning, talking Howard into coming with him, and Howard kidnaps Chako without Shingo's knowledge. When the other children wake up and find them missing, Luna, Bell and Menori follow. In the forest, Chako and Shingo are fascinated by the fact that gravity seems lower. Both groups find themselves lost and walking in circles. Chako, Shingo and Howard find a giant tobihane, dead, and are subsequently chased by the giant Tasmanian-devil-like predator that killed it. They run into Luna, Bell and Menori, and the six of them flee together. The mysterious voice tells Luna to jump over a cliff to escape, and when the children do so, they disappear half-way down and find themselves in front of the ruins. They realise the forest they were lost in was some sort of illusion. The giant crustacean appears again, but in a reflex, Luna tells it to stop in her mind, and it does. They approach the door of the ruins, and when Luna places her hand against it, the ruins glow pink and the door opens. The children enter, finding a small alien boy in a cold-sleep capsule inside.
19	"This Child... I Beg..."; Transliteration: "Kono Ko wo... Tanomu..." (Japanese: コノコヲ...タノム...)	Sang-Il Sim	Written by : Shōji Yonemura; Storyboarded by : Toshiyuki Shimazu	Ki-Duk Park	March 4, 2004
The children discuss the boy, and the possibility of first contact with aliens, and Luna remembers the image of the alien family that she'd seen the first time she came to the ruins. Luna looks at the boy in thought, while the other children push random buttons on a nearby console to see what happens. Suddenly, a hologram of the planet appears, showing several locations marked. The planet starts red, but blue areas start spreading from each marked location. In the cold-sleep capsule, the boy suddenly opens his eyes. They all hear the voice that Luna had heard earlier – it says "Alduram Gyet", and when Luna places her hand on the capsule and repeats it, the capsule opens. As the child gets out and stands up, a card comes out of the cold-sleep capsule's control panel. When they take the card, the ruins start shutting down, and the door starts closing. The children escape with the alien boy just in time. The children try to open the door again and search for another door to go back inside, but are unsuccessful. Chako estimates the ruins to be five hundred to a thousand years old. They discuss what to do with the alien boy, and Luna resolves to take him back with them, despite the strain he may put on their resources. They head back, but unnoticed by them, the ruins start to emit a shiny substance from the top. Meanwhile, back at Everyone's House, Sharla finds an ID card belonging to another boy in Kaoru's clothing while cleaning. When she asks him about it, he tells her it belonged to the person he killed.
20	"A-da-m"; Transliteration: "A-da-mu" (Japanese: ア•ダ•ム)	Yasunaga Tsuji	Written by : Takeshi Mochizuki; Storyboarded by : Nobuo Tomizawa	Teiichi Takiguchi	March 11, 2004
The next day, Howard volunteers to look after the boy – who seems to be unable to speak – in order to get out of doing more strenuous work. Luna thinks Alduram Gyet is the boy's name, but Howard, unable to pronounce it, dubs him Adam. Chako and Shingo study the card from the ruins. Howard attempts to teach Adam how to steal fruit without being caught, but while Howard is distracted, Adam fills his arms with fruit and starts throwing them around. Menori scolds him for wasting food, and Howard accidentally reveals that he was teaching Adam to steal. Adam tries to help the others in their tasks, but whatever he does to help, Menori scolds him for messing up. Later, Menori plays her violin, and Adam sits listening, enthralled. That night, the children try to teach Adam to say their names, but Adam is only interested in Menori. He tries to get her to play her violin, but Menori becomes angry at him for touching it. Menori tells Luna she has no idea what to do with children, but Luna tells her she just needs to smile. The next day, Sharla tells Luna about the exchange she had with Kaoru while the others were at the ruins. Adam helps Menori and Howard hang up fish, and reveals that he has already learned how to do it. Later, Luna teaches him that fire is hot, and he catches on almost immediately, looking to Menori for approval. Howard tries to get him to steal food again, but he's already learnt not to. That night, Adam serves dinner. The following day, the children notice the clouds are getting thicker and the weather colder. Howard, in a fit of jealousy, gives Menori's violin to Adam. She becomes furious with Adam. She realizes her mistake when Howard accidentally lets slip that he'd given Adam the violin and reveals that he was jealous, but Adam has run away. Shingo finds him crying in the cleaning area. Menori apologizes and wipes his tears, and Adam speaks her name, then his own. The two walk back to the house hand-in-hand.
21	"Winter is Coming"; Transliteration: "Fuyu ga Yatte Kuru" (Japanese: 冬がやって来る)	Keiichirō Furuya	Written by : Yoshifumi Fukushima; Storyboarded by : Kazuhide Tomonaga	Kenji Hachizaki	March 18, 2004
As the weather continues to become colder and more overcast, Luna, Shingo and Chako return to the ruins to investigate it as a warmer place to live, but are unable to find a way in. Chako takes a sample of the substance being emitted from the top, and the three return to Everyone's House. Menori and Howard scavenge the upholstery from the shuttle's seats to make cloaks. Bell, foreseeing colder weather to come, wants everyone to move to a cave. However, despite Bell's enthusiasm for its shape and location, the cave's rocky floor and dank atmosphere don't endear it to any of the other children, who are reluctant to leave the house they worked so hard to build. Bell decides to work on his own. After a week, food supplies at the house are getting low. Bell works on making the cave livable by himself, but Kaoru secretly gives him half the fish he caught. Luna goes to see how Bell is doing, and is surprised by the amount of work he's done. Bell, however, collapses from exhaustion. While resting, he recounts a story from when he was growing up on a developing planet – his father predicted a cold snap coming, but worked on his own to shore up their habitat's safety systems, and because of that, the habitat survived. First Luna, then the others, resolve to help Bell as well, and Bell is soon proven right when Chako determines the substance coming from the ruins is an infrared reflector, which is blocking the heat from the sun, meaning it can only get colder. The cave is soon finished – just in time, as it starts to snow.
22	"I Don't Want to Say Goodbye"; Transliteration: "Sayonara wa Iya da" (Japanese: さよならはいやだ)	Keiko Oyamada, Sang-Yong Um	Written by : Shōji Yonemura; Storyboarded by : Nobuo Tomizawa	Teiichi Takiguchi, Woo-Chi Choi	March 25, 2004
Two weeks later, the snow lies thick on the ground, but in the cave – named "Star Hole" by Sharla – the children are surviving. Pague is living in a rock shelter nearby, but he is suffering in the cold, and leaves for him to eat are getting scarcer. Bell, Shingo and Chako return to the ruins to find a way in and shut it down, trying to interface the communications system with the card that came from Adam's cold-sleep capsule, but are unsuccessful. On the way back, however, they find a valley full of other creatures like Pague, which is kept warm and fertile by a hot spring. That night, they theorize that the ruins may be a terraforming machine, but are unsure of why it's making the weather too cold even for Adam, who came from the ruins. They also mention the herd of pagues, and the children decide to return Pague there. Adam, however, has become attached to Pague, and doesn't want to see him go. They find a cleft that Pague may be able to walk down with the help of a pulley system to control his descent, but it needs work to smooth it down before it can be usable. Howard, chasing a tobihane, accidentally starts an avalanche, which does the job for them. They successfully return Pague to his mother. The children – and Adam especially – are sad to see him go, but know that he will be happy. Howard accidentally discovers a large amount of sweet potatoes that were hidden by the snow.
23	"Into the Light"; Transliteration: "Hikari no Naka ni" (Japanese: 光の中に)	Yasunaga Tsuji	Written by : Shōji Yonemura; Storyboarded by : Kazuhide Tomonaga	Yūko Sobu	April 1, 2004
The snow is falling heavily, and no one is able to find any food. Kaoru decides to head out again, even though it's close to sunset, but falls down a crevasse while chasing a tobihane. When he doesn't return, Luna goes to look for him. She finds him and pulls him out of the crevasse, but the snow is falling too heavily to find their way back to the Star Hole, so they spend the night in a snow cave. Luna brings up the time Sharla found another boy's ID card in Kaoru's clothing. The boy was Louis, Kaoru's rival at pilot school. While Kaoru was piloting a ship through an asteroid field, the hull was punctured and Louis was sucked into space. Kaoru had blamed himself ever since, but Luna, remembering her father's last words, tell Kaoru that perhaps Louis was telling Kaoru to live on.
24	"Who? Who is It?"; Transliteration: "Dare? Dare Nano?" (Japanese: 誰? 誰なの?)	Keiko Oyamada, Jeung-Hun Ryu	Written by : Yoshifumi Fukushima; Storyboarded by : Toshihiko Masuda	Teiichi Takiguchi, Ki-Duk Park	April 8, 2004
A blizzard has been going on for ten days, preventing any of the children from leaving the cave. Shingo, Chako and Adam use the opportunity to investigate the card they found in the ruins. They realize the card is a biometric identification system, encoded to respond only to Adam. Bell, Luna, Shingo, Chako and Adam brave the blizzard to head for the ruins. While they stop for the night en route, Adam dreams about his parents. Chako starts shutting down due to the extreme cold, but at her insistence, they press on. They reach the ruins and try to open the door, but Chako collapses. Adam cries out for her, and suddenly the card lifts into the air, glowing green, and the door opens. Inside, they use the cold-sleep capsule's energy system to revive Chako. Chako realizes that the marked locations on the hologram of the planet show the locations of terraforming machines. Adam finds the door to a previously unnoticed room, which has an activated machine inside. Chako and Shingo are shocked by an electric force-field protecting the doorway, but Bell rips the cover off the cold-sleep capsule and presses against the force field until it shorts out. Luna and Adam enter, but are stopped by holograms of Adam's parents, which suddenly turn into amorphous blobs and start to drown them. Luna's mysterious power flares up, enabling her to break free and shut down the machine. Outside, the snow stops and the sun emerges from the clouds.
25	"For the Sake of the Future"; Transliteration: "Mirai no Tame ni" (Japanese: 未来のために)	Yasunaga Tsuji	Written by : Takeshi Mochizuki; Storyboarded by : Hazuki Mizumoto, Yūichirō Yano	Keiko Nakaji	April 15, 2004
Back at Star Hole, Adam has a dream in which he sees his parents in some sort of control room. He sees his mother coughing, then they place him in the cold-sleep capsule, and he awakes with a start. Later, the children discuss the dream. Chako and Shingo believe the ruins are a spaceship, and want to return with Adam to spend several days investigating. Kaoru takes them there, while the rest of the children move back to Everyone's House. Five days pass while Chako and Shingo investigate every nook and cranny in the ruins, and Adam tries to recall the memory of his parents. Adam eventually remembers his mother's last words – "for the sake of the future", and when he speaks them out loud, the walls light up, and the centre of the room's floor lowers down, revealing a hidden door to the control room. Chako and Shingo get excited, but Adam becomes downhearted, unable to reconcile the memory of his kind parents with the entities that attacked him and Luna earlier. Shingo interfaces his communications system with the control panel to broadcast a distress signal. Luna and Kaoru arrive with a care package – Kaoru goes back to get everyone else, while Luna comforts Adam. The next day, Chako and Shingo try to make the spaceship fly, but discover it can't lift off because the gravity control unit is broken – Chako realizes that's the reason the gravity was lower in the Eastern Forest. The other children arrive, just as an alert starts flashing on the ship's screen, and the room starts shaking. When the earthquake finishes, a human voice comes from the communications system – someone who picked up their distress call.
26	"Please Respond"; Transliteration: "Outou Negaimasu" (Japanese: 応答願います)	Masakatsu Iijima	Written by : Shōji Yonemura; Storyboarded by : Masakatsu Iijima	Hiroki Ikeshita	April 22, 2004
Shingo is able to make contact with the newly arrived spaceship, the Orion, who reveal that they need a replacement gyrostabilizer, before the radio cuts off as the ship enters the atmosphere. Adam fears that he'll be left behind alone if they get rescued, but Luna promises to take him with them. The children run to the four sides of the island to make signal fires so that the ship can find them. Howard gets the closest one, the eastern end, and starts his fire, Adam, Chako and Shingo stay at the ruins, and the rest of them head west. While waiting to climb the rope up the cliff leading out of the Eastern Forest, Kaoru decides to investigate behind the waterfall, and finds a cave leading up to the top. They then split up to head for the north, west and south extremities of the island. As it starts raining, before the other children can start their fires, the Orion arrives from the east, flying over Howard's head and just clearing the trees. It flies over the island, before splashing down in the ocean on the western side. Luna and Sharla see an escape pod fall from the ship before it lands. The children return to Everyone's House to compare notes, then head for the beach. They can see the ship – a transport freighter – wedged on a rock, but nobody seems to be emerging. They start a fire so that they can be seen, and wait for the storm to abate.
27	"Tenacious Bunch"; Transliteration: "Shibutoi Yatsura" (Japanese: しぶとい奴ら)	Keiko Oyamada, Yukio Okazaki	Written by : Yoshifumi Fukushima; Storyboarded by : Toshiyuki Shimazu	Tsutomu Murakami, Teiichi Takiguchi	April 29, 2004
Kaoru finds the escape pod from the Orion washed up on the shore, and brings the occupant – an old man – to the rest of the children. When the old man wakes, he hurriedly puts out their signal fire, telling them the people on the ship are escaped prisoners. They'd hijacked the ship and killed the rest of the crew, only to be sucked through a gravity storm, finding themselves near the planet, where they picked up Shingo's signal. The old man, named Porte, was the ship's mechanic – he sabotaged the ship as it came in to land, stealing the spare gravity control device before escaping. He also realizes he knows who the children are – their disappearance was big news throughout known space, and Howard's father had offered a large reward for their safe return. The children take Porte to the ruins – leaving Kaoru behind to watch for the prisoners – but Porte, Shingo and Chako find it difficult to interface the Orion's gravity control device with the system in the ruins. Meanwhile, the storm clears and the three prisoners, Brindo, Zilba and Bob, emerge from the ship. They board their ship's life-raft, using Bob's cyborg arm as an outboard motor, and come to shore – on the way, Brindo kills the snake monster with a laser gun. On the beach, they investigate the remains of the children's shuttle, and realize the gyrostabilizer they need must be somewhere else. The trio goes to Everyone's House, while Kaoru returns to the ruins to relay the results of his reconnaissance. They discover, however, that Howard is missing.
28	"This is for Everybody's Sake Too"; Transliteration: "Kore mo Minna no Tame" (Japanese: これもみんなのため)	Keiichirō Furuya	Written by : Yoshifumi Fukushima; Storyboarded by : Nobuo Tomizawa	Kenji Hachizaki	May 6, 2004
Howard has stolen the gyrostabilizer from the ruins and is taking it to the three escapees to bargain it exchange for their rescue, with the added incentive of the reward they would get for the children's safe return. The escapees tell Howard they can only take one person with them, so Howard decides to accept the offer, and send help for the others later. Once the escapees have the gyrostabilizer, however, they turn on Howard and are about to kill him, until they realize that Howard took the wrong component. Kaoru negotiates an exchange over the radio – the real gyrostabilizer for Howard. Kaoru tries to go alone to make the exchange, risking only himself, but Luna persuades him they need to work together. Knowing that the escapees will try to kill them the moment they get the chance, the children come up with a plan to both rescue Howard and escape with their lives. At dawn, Kaoru, Bell, Luna and Menori move into position to carry it out. Adam, not wanting to be left behind, chases after them.
29	"Me Too, At Last..."; Transliteration: "Boku nimo Yatto..." (Japanese: ぼくにもやっと...)	Yasunaga Tsuji	Written by : Shōji Yonemura; Storyboarded by : Kazuhide Tomonaga	Hiroaki Noguchi	May 13, 2004
Menori, acting as spokesperson, tells the escapees to put down their weapons and move away from them, and Brindo plays along. They start the hostage exchange, but Brindo catches Kaoru heading towards the discarded weapons, and Zilba pulls out a needle gun and shoots at him. In the resulting confrontation, Howard gets hit by a needle. The children cross the river to escape, but find themselves still in range of Brindo's laser gun. Things look dire until Adam arrives, followed by the giant crustacean from the ruins, acting under Adam's unconscious control, which distracts the escapees long enough for the children to escape. They head for the ruins, relying on the illusory forest to slow the escapees down, leaving Kaoru behind to watch them. At the ruins, they lay Howard in the cold-sleep capsule, and Porte gives him an antidote for the poison in the needle. In a feverish dream, Howard relives the last year of his life, from school, where he was always surrounded by followers, to now, where none of the other children ever do what he tells them. He realizes, however, that now is the first time he's ever had true friends. When he awakens, he admits to the others that it was he who'd pressed the release button on the shuttle during the gravity storm. Luna recognizes his courage in telling them, and the children all swear friendship together.
30	"What Should I Do?"; Transliteration: "Dou Sureba ii no" (Japanese: どうすればいいの)	Yasunaga Tsuji	Written by : Yoshifumi Fukushima; Storyboarded by : Toshihiko Masuda	Takeshi Baba	May 20, 2004
The escapees are becoming increasingly frustrated by the illusory forest, while Porte, Chako and Shingo make some progress in interfacing the gravity control unit with the alien equipment. The children get excited, but Kaoru returns with sobering news – the escapees are starting to figure out the forest. Since Porte needs two or three more days, Kaoru, Bell, Luna and Menori plan traps to slow them down. Adam, looking dejected, sneaks out and finds Pague in the illusory forest outside. He confides in Pague that despite Luna's offer to take him back to their colony with them, he doesn't really want to go – this planet is his home. The next day, Adam sneaks out again, and Sharla notices he's missing. She and Luna look for him, finding him with Pague. The three escapees also see Pague, though not the children, and plan to kill him to eat. Kaoru reveals his presence to them as a distraction to allow Luna, Sharla and Adam to escape, but though they all get away, Brindo sees the children leaving the forest, and figures out its secret.
31	"We Can Definitely Do It"; Transliteration: "Oretachi wa Kitto Yareru" (Japanese: 俺達はきっとやれる)	Keiko Oyamada, Byung-Gil Yang	Written by : Yuka Yamada; Storyboarded by : Toshiyuki Shimazu	Teiichi Takiguchi, Ki-Duk Park	May 27, 2004
The children put their plans into action, first separating the escapees, then trapping Bob in a cage and catching Brindo in a snare. However, Kaoru is tied down fighting Zilba. Brindo quickly frees himself, and soon corners Luna, Bell and Menori, but Kaoru shoots the gun out of his hand with an arrow, and Bell smashes it with a rock. Bob also breaks free, and the three regroup and close in on the children. Suddenly, the herd of pagues – with Pague himself in their midst – stampedes between the two groups, allowing the children time to escape. When the herd moves on, Bob tries to follow the children, and falls into a pit trap. With their traps exhausted, the children barricade themselves inside the ruins, knowing the escapees will be unable to open the door. However, Brindo has figured out the children's attachment to Pague, and captures him to hold him hostage.
32	"Hurry!!"; Transliteration: "Isoge!!" (Japanese: 急げ!!)	Keiko Oyamada, Jeung-Hun Ryu	Written by : Shōji Yonemura; Storyboarded by : Nobuo Tomizawa	Teiichi Takiguchi, Ki-Duk Park	June 3, 2004
Knowing they can't sacrifice Pague for their own benefit, the children decide to give up on fixing the ruins and steal the Orion instead. They hide in the control room and close up the floor, then open up the outer door. They lure the escapees into the inner chamber with the terraforming device, then lock them inside, open the floor once again and escape, taking the gyrostabilizer with them and closing the door behind them. They head for the beach, but behind them, Bob batters down the inner door, and Brindo uses a miniature bomb on the outer door. The children reach the beach, and find the Orion's life-raft. Luna, Bell, Menori and Howard remain behind to lay traps for the escapees, while the remaining children head for the ship – Kaoru to pilot (as he's the only one of the children with actual pilot training), Porte, Shingo and Chako to crack the door code and repair Porte's sabotage, and Sharla and Adam to keep them away from the escapees. They quickly gain entry and prepare for takeoff, but on the island, Brindo figures out that the children will be lying in wait on the direct path, and so they take a detour, missing the traps completely, and arriving at the beach unhindered.
33	"Commencing Liftoff"; Transliteration: "Fujou Kaishi" (Japanese: 浮上開始)	Yoshihide Yuuzumi	Written by : Shōji Yonemura; Storyboarded by : Kazuhide Tomonaga	Sawako Miyamoto	June 10, 2004
On the Orion, Kaoru familiarizes himself with the controls, Porte, Shingo and Chako head for the engineering room, while Sharla and Adam hide in the aft cargo hold. On the beach, Bob makes a raft from logs, and as the children race to intercept, they cast off. Using Bob's cyborg arm as an outboard motor, they quickly move out of arrow rage. Luna uses her power to warn Adam, and he warns the others. Porte installs the gyrostabilizer and the engine powers up. However, as Kaoru begins liftoff, the escapees board the ship through the aft cargo hold's hatch. They pass Sharla and Adam without noticing them, and head for the bridge, where the rest have holed themselves up. As Bob batters the door down, they escape, heading back to the cargo hold, but the escapees follow. Sharla climbs into a humanoid-shaped power loader and fights Bob, wailing the whole time, while Kaoru fights Zilba, but in the ensuing struggle, canisters of flammable gas get ignited, causing a large explosion. Realizing the ship is done for, they evacuate, with the children riding on the power loader, and Porte fashioning a parachute from some cloth. The power loader splashes down in the ocean, and the children swim to shore, but Porte lands in the forest, his parachute on fire from burning debris. The escapees gather on the Orion's bridge, and get a front-seat view as the ship collides with the ruins with full force, killing them all.
34	"Go to the Continent?!"; Transliteration: "Tairiku e Iku?!" (Japanese: 大陸へ行く?!)	Keiko Oyamada, Sang-Yong Um	Written by : Yoshifumi Fukushima; Storyboarded by : Toshihiko Masuda	Teiichi Takiguchi, Woo-Chi Choi	June 17, 2004
The children find Porte hanging from a tree and bind his wounds, then head for the ruins. There, they find that both the Orion and the ruins have been all but destroyed. The children are all stunned, but Adam is especially distraught, as the ruins represented his only link to his parents. Luna suggests heading to the mainland to find the main terraforming machine, as they may also find another spaceship there, but the others, still reeling from the shock, decide it would be better to rebuild the basis of their lifestyle first, and consider bigger things afterwards. Two weeks later, everyone is still despondent and apathetic, with only Luna, Sharla, Bell and Kaoru still taking a proactive role in things. Sharla shows Luna a cargo container from the Orion that she found in the forest, and the two investigate, finding a functioning gravity control unit inside. Luna tries it out, but accidentally gets knocked out when she turns it off, which alerts Adam, who brings the rest of the children. The others criticize Luna for risking herself, but Sharla angrily tells them she did it for their sake. The gravity control unit revitalizes everyone's spirits, and they decide to build a ship to travel to the mainland.
35	"Although We Don't Have Enough Materials"; Transliteration: "Juubun na Zairyou mo Nai noni" (Japanese: 十分な材料もないのに)	Keiko Oyamada, Hak-Bin Lee	Written by : Shōji Yonemura; Storyboarded by : Toshiyuki Shimazu	Teiichi Takiguchi, Seong-Wan Kim	June 24, 2004
With Shingo designing and Porte giving technical advice while recuperating from his injuries, the children start to build their ship with Pague's help, using the largely intact hull of the Orion for the main body, and searching the forest and ruins for parts and components. However, a disagreement caused by lack of parts is starting to open a rift between Shingo and Porte. Since the gravity control unit they found wouldn't be powerful enough to produce both lift and propulsion for their ship, Shingo comes up with the idea of using sail power for propulsion, but Porte rejects it outright, not willing to ignore centuries of tradition in spaceship construction. Later, Porte apologizes to Shingo and approves his plans, having realized that Shingo's flexible thinking is better than his own rigid adherence to tradition. While the other children build the ship, Porte, Shingo and Chako work on the ship's wiring and controls. Porte tells Shingo a story from his son – after an argument the two had, the son boarded a newly built colonizing ship, but due to an accident, the ship was lost with all hands. Porte became a mechanic in order to search known space in case his son escaped in an escape pod, but in doing so, saw many amazing sights. Shingo heads for bed, but unnoticed by him, Porte collapses from a pain in his chest.
36	"You are a Very Important Comrade"; Transliteration: "Totemo Daiji na Nakama Desu" (Japanese: とても大事な仲間です)	Yasunaga Tsuji	Written by : Yuka Yamada; Storyboarded by : Toshihiko Masuda	Ichirō Ogawa	July 1, 2004
As the children finish construction on the ship and load supplies for the journey, Porte visits each one except Shingo and gives them words of advice and encouragement. The children turn to Sharla to give the ship a name, but she asks for time to think on it. That night, they head back to Everyone's House for their last night on the island. As Menori plays her violin, they think over the many things that have happened to them. Later, after everyone has gone to bed, Shingo finds Porte sitting by the fire. Porte gives Shingo his mechanic's jacket, and the two lie side-by-side. In the morning, the children find that Porte has died during the night, from space sickness. They tearfully bury him at the foot of the Magnificent Tree, and Sharla announces that the name of their ship will be Orion, the same as Porte's ship. Shingo promises to find Porte's son, and together they leave to launch the Orion. The launching goes off without a hitch, and Pague comes to see them off as they sail away from the island. The long journey to the continent has begun.
37	"Never Say Die"; Transliteration: "Yowane wo Haku na" (Japanese: 弱音を吐くな)	Yoshihide Yuuzumi	Written by : Shōji Yonemura; Storyboarded by : Kazuhide Tomonaga	Sawako Miyamoto	July 8, 2004
A few days into the trip, first Shingo and Adam, then Menori, Sharla and Howard become incredibly seasick. In addition, the ship has become becalmed, causing some concerns over provisions. Howard and Menori try to talk Luna into turning back to the island they came from, but Luna stands by her original decision. Luna stands watch in the crow's nest, brooding over things and zoning out to the extent that she fails to notice a huge storm brewing right behind her, even when it is right on top of them. As Kaoru and Chako struggle to keep the ship afloat in the storm, Bell and Luna try to furl the sail, but are unable to pull it against the strength of the wind until Howard and Menori emerge from below and help. Just as they finish, Sharla calls up from below – the sleeping room is filling with water. The children scramble to bail the water out, while Bell and Shingo work to seal the leak. As the storm abates outside, the children suddenly realize they're not feeling seasick anymore. Suddenly, the Orion rides up a huge wave, tipping Luna out of the back of the boat. Despite Bell's efforts to catch her, she is quickly swept away.
38	"I Am Not Defeated!"; Transliteration: "Atashi, Makenai yo" (Japanese: 私、負けないよ)	Yasunaga Tsuji	Written by : Shōji Yonemura; Storyboarded by : Yūichirō Yano	Keiko Nakaji	July 15, 2004
Bell tries to jump in after Luna, but the others hold him back. Kaoru attempts to turn the ship around, but because of the measures taken to avoid capsizing during the storm, the steering won't work. As Luna drifts out of sight, Shingo blames himself for not anticipating such a storm, but Chako is confident in Luna's ability to survive. In the ocean, Luna is being buffeted around by the waves, kept afloat only by her lifejacket and her memory of her father. The next morning, she awakens on the beach of a small sand cay. She spends the day trying to find food and water, and start a fire, but she's unsuccessful, only getting blistered palms and a cut on her hand for her troubles. After sunset, she finally manages to start a fire using a bow drill which she'd once seen in a movie. As she stares at the fire, she remembers a time when her father took her camping in a colony forest dome once, when they talked about terraforming other planets to make them fit for human habitation. Awakening early the next morning, she is surprised to notice that her hands have completely healed. That evening, she suddenly hears Adam's voice in her mind, and is overjoyed to see the Orion come sailing out of the sunset.
39	"Why Such a Thing"; Transliteration: "Doushite Sonna Mono ga" (Japanese: どうしてそんなものが)	Yasunaga Tsuji	Written by : Yoshifumi Fukushima; Storyboarded by : Toshiyuki Shimazu	Yūko Sobu	July 22, 2004
Heading for the continent once more, the children have realized that something happened to Luna on the island. Chako scans Luna and discovers nanomachines in her bloodstream, which were the reason for her quick healing. She scans the rest of the children as well, but only Adam has them too, which explains why Luna and Adam are able to communicate, why Luna could hear the mysterious voice, and why she could open the door to the ruins. Luna is extremely concerned that she has nanomachines, but tries to behave as normal in front of the other children. However, they can tell that it's just an act, and after three days, they plan a cheer-up-Luna surprise party. While Luna spends the day sleeping, Howard tries to catch a fish for a main dish, and the rest of the children prepare the deck for the party. Howard is having no success, but as Chako comes to check on him, an enormous fish suddenly bites his line, dragging Howard into the water. Kaoru stops the ship, and then kills the fish with a spear. After sunset, Luna comes up on deck to start her shift, and the children all spring the surprise party on her. They have a meal prepared for her, then put on a play written by Sharla. The next morning, Howard, standing watch in the crow's nest, sights land. They've arrived at the continent.
40	"We've Finally Arrived"; Transliteration: "Toutou Tsuita" (Japanese: とうとう着いた)	Keiko Oyamada	Written by : Yuka Yamada; Storyboarded by : Hiroyuki Morita	Teiichi Takiguchi, Byung-Gil Yang	July 29, 2004
Kaoru pilots the Orion up a river to find a place where they can come to shore, and they decide to stop for lunch on solid ground. As the children set up a picnic, they all notice that Sharla has become a much stronger person than she used to be, and conversation quickly turns to everyone's parents. Luna, however, as the only one of the human children who is an orphan, becomes saddened by the conversation, and Bell notices. As the children plan their route, they decide to spend the day replenishing their supplies. Suddenly, an earthquake occurs. Kaoru fishes, Chako and Shingo check the ship, Luna and Bell find an edible cactus, and Sharla and Howard discover a pair of ostrich-like birds taking care of a nest. The children all go to see, but the male chases them away, and Adam trips over, scraping his hands. Later, Bell goes to help Luna make dinner, and he clumsily offers to be Luna's family since she has no one else. Howard, overhearing, misunderstands it as a marriage proposal, and tells the rest. When they come back to the group, Howard teases Bell, causing him to run away, and Luna follows. The two go back to see the nest again, and Luna tells Bell that she's realized she's not alone like she thought – she has all of the other children as a family. Luna catches the rest of the children eavesdropping on them, but as they all prepare to head back to the ship, Adam suddenly becomes weak and feverish.
41	"That's Why I Have to Go"; Transliteration: "Dakara Ikanakucha" (Japanese: だから行かなくちゃ)	Keiko Oyamada	Written by : Shōji Yonemura; Storyboarded by : Kazuhide Tomonaga	Yūko Sobu	August 5, 2004
On the Orion, Chako determines that virus-like nanomachines have entered Adam's body and changed the nanomachines already there into malignant ones, and they probably entered through the scrape on his hand. They decide to head directly for the nearest sub-terraforming machine. After passing through a forest, they reach an ancient, crumbling city. They stop by a large building that they hope is a hospital, but the medicines they find had already decomposed long ago. Chako estimates them to be five hundred to a thousand years old, the same age as Adam's ruins. When Howard finds writing on a medicine bottle that's the same as writing they saw in the ruins, they realize that Adam's people had come from this planet, which raises the question of why he was in a spaceship on the island. They continue on to the terraforming machine, but are prevented from approaching by a spherical drone that fires a laser at them. Luna wants to approach alone, hoping that the nanomachines in her body – along with Adam's ID card – will cause it to recognize her as one of Adam's people, but the rest of the children insist on acting as decoys. When Luna addresses the drone, it briefly glows blue, and she hears a voice saying "people are unnecessary". The drone vaporizes Adam's ID card, and is about to attack Luna when Bell rescues her. Kaoru leaps on the drone and stabs in with a knife, destroying it, but in the process the drone's laser shatters the entrance door on the terraforming machine. Luna tells the others about the voice she heard.
42	"Mysterious Power"; Transliteration: "Fushigi na Chikara" (Japanese: 不思議な力)	Keiko Oyamada, Hak-Bin Lee	Written by : Shōji Yonemura; Storyboarded by : Yūichirō Yano	Teiichi Takiguchi, Seong-Wan Kim	August 12, 2004
The children enter the terraforming machine, leaving Sharla behind to look after Adam. Inside, Luna finds a stairway leading deeper, where they are attacked by a large humanoid robot, which Chako identifies as a maintenance robot. They defeat it when Kaoru plunges his knife into its head. The strange voice which Luna heard earlier speaks to Luna through the robot. It identifies itself as the main computer that manages the terraforming machines, Survive. With Luna translating for the other children, Survive recounts the history of the planet. A thousand years ago it was inhabited a people with a high level of technology, but environmental catastrophes were making it uninhabitable – things such as ozone depletion, pollution, and large-scale tectonic events. The majority of the people built a huge fleet of ships and escaped into space, but some of them remained behind and built terraforming machines to revitalize the planet, creating Survive – who was built into a spaceship – to help manage it. As they began to work, they realized that it would take a thousand years for the planet to return to normal, and sent a message to those who left to let them know. At the same time, Survive came to the conclusion that the people were the cause of the damage to the planet, and in order to protect the planet, it had to kill the people. It released a virus-type nanomachine which caused all of the people to die. The children question among themselves whether it's possible for people to coexist peacefully with the environment, but are unable to reach a satisfactory conclusion. They find the terraforming machine's medical lab and create a cure for Adam, taking a copy with them in a hand scanner. With Adam cured, they head for the main terraforming machine, and the spaceship that they now know is there.
43	"Together We Will Return to the Colony"; Transliteration: "Isshoni Koroni ni Kaerunda" (Japanese: 一緒にコロニーに帰るんだ)	Yasunaga Tsuji	Written by : Yuka Yamada; Storyboarded by : Masakatsu Iijima	Takeshi Baba	August 19, 2004
The Orion travels through a desert, but progress is slow, as sand keeps getting into the engine room, forcing them to stop while Shingo and Chako clean it. When they're on the move again, they have lunch together, but food and water supplies are starting to get low. To cheer them up, Sharla shows everyone a desert flower that she found, made of crystallized sand, but Howard, getting frustrated and afraid, grabs it and smashes it on the floor. Adam realizes that Sharla has been sharing her water ration amongst everyone else, and tells Luna, but Sharla promises Luna that she's ok. They become caught in a sandstorm, and the gravity control unit becomes unstable, and then shuts down. Kaoru manages to bring the Orion safely to a halt, but before Shingo and Chako can effect repairs, the Orion starts sinking in quicksand. The children grab what they can and prepare to evacuate. They all jump off the ship together and run for solid ground, but Sharla slips and falls back on the ship. Howard runs back to save her, and Bell follows, with a rope around his waist for safety. Howard gets a grip on Sharla, but because of his safety rope, Bell can't reach them, and they both fall, vanishing into the quicksand and leaving Bell just holding Howard's jacket. The Orion vanishes after them.
44	"Howard Saved Us"; Transliteration: "Hawādo ga Tasukete Kureta" (Japanese: ハワードが助けてくれた)	Keiko Oyamada, Byung-Gil Yang	Written by : Yoshifumi Fukushima; Storyboarded by : Toshiyuki Shimazu	Teiichi Takiguchi, Ki-Duk Park	August 26, 2004
The children sit stunned by the side of the quicksand pit. Luna and Shingo each blame themselves – Luna for suggesting they go to the mainland, and Shingo because the Orion was his design. Menori, knowing that they would never survive in the desert in the day, forces them all to start walking. They walk by night and rest by day, reaching a forest at the edge of the desert the following night. Chako tries to lighten the mood, but Shingo becomes angry at Menori's hard-line stance and the two get into an argument. As they lie down to sleep, they all recall memories of Howard and Sharla. The next day, the children continue through the forest, soon reaching a ruined city. When they enter the city, they are immediately chased by three drones. Luna and Kaoru act as decoys to allow the rest to escape, but Shingo, still feeling guilty, tries to sacrifice himself to the drones, but Menori saves him, and the two run into a sewer to escape. Shingo tells Menori he's better off dead, but she slaps him and asks him if Sharla or Howard would be happy if he died. A drone attacks them, and when Shingo tries to protect Menori, Howard's mirror – which was in his jacket around Shingo's shoulders – flies out and distracts the drone, causing it to shoot the ceiling above itself, crushing it. The other children hear the commotion, and find Menori and Shingo in the sewer. They decide to continue along the sewer, as Chako realizes it's the most direct route to Survive's buried spaceship, and after a long walk, they find themselves up against the spaceship's outer hull.
45	"Father! Mother!"; Transliteration: "Otōsan! Okaasan!" (Japanese: お父さん! お母さん!)	Yasunaga Tsuji	Written by : Shōji Yonemura; Storyboarded by : Kazuhide Tomonaga	Shinobu Mōri	September 2, 2004
The children find a door in the hull, which opens when Luna holds up her hand. Inside, they encounter a maze of passageways, but drones quickly find them and they are forced to flee. After they run past one section of corridor, a small being emerges from a hatch in the wall, and instantly recognizes Adam. The small being, who speaks a language only Luna and Adam can understand, asks the children to follow him, but assuming him to be another enemy, they run from him. When the drones chase the being instead of them, they realize they can probably trust him, and when he appears in front of them from another hatch, they decide to follow him. He leads them to a room near the bottom of the spaceship that's hidden from Survive's control, where Chako, realizing the being is a robot, reprograms him to speak a language the children can understand. He introduces himself as Tswarkom, but Chako decides that's too difficult to pronounce and dubs him Tako. Tako shows Adam a message from his parents, in which they explain they placed him in the ruins to keep him safe from Survive, to be awoken from cold sleep after the planet's restoration was complete. The ruins would also provide someone to take care of him – Luna – but in doing so would leave them open to infiltration by Survive, which is why it became so cold. Adam asks Tako where his parents are now, and Tako takes the children to a huge room filled with hovering coffins. Tako lowers one of the coffins to the floor, and Adam's parents are inside. Later, the children realize that regardless of whether they plan to stay on the planet or take the spaceship and leave, they'll need to do something about Survive. They decide to use the hidden room as a base, and ask Tako about food supplies. Tako takes them along a secret tunnel to a forested area by a lake outside the spaceship, where they see the spaceship – and the main terraforming machine – from the outside for the first time.
46	"I Missed You"; Transliteration: "Aitakatta" (Japanese: 会いたかった)	Keiko Oyamada	Written by : Yuka Yamada; Storyboarded by : Hiroyuki Morita	Sawako Miyamoto	September 9, 2004
Outside, the children gather food while avoiding the drones. They discuss how much the area reminds them of their island, and Adam is excited to see a pague, except it's quite small. As the pague returns to its mother, two drones arrive, but someone shoots arrows at them from the bushes and destroys them. In a moment, Howard and Sharla emerge from the bushes. The children have a tearful reunion. Sharla tells the others that when they were sucked down by the quicksand, they fell into flowing water underground. Howard, however, sits in stoic silence. Sharla passes it off as him being tired, and prevents Chako from scanning him. When Luna and Sharla make skin-to-skin contact, Luna feels a weird sensation. Later, when the children return to finding food, they discover that all the drones have disappeared, which concerns them. They tell Sharla about the hidden room. The pague and his mother return, and Sharla and Howard take him to play with it, but out of everyone's sight, they share sinister glances. They suggest to Adam that he pick flowers for Luna at the end of a tree branch overhanging the lake, but when he climbs the tree, Howard shakes the branch, causing Adam to fall into the water, and then jumps in after him. Adam calls out for Luna, and she, Bell and Howard dive in to save Adam and Howard. When Kaoru reaches Adam, Adam is already sinking, but Luna's power activates, and he starts floating up again. On the shore, the children are concerned about Howard's listless state, but when Chako tries to scan him again, he knocks her away. In private, Sharla tells Luna he's suffering from post-traumatic stress from being buried in the quicksand, but when they hug, Luna again feels a strange sensation. As the sun sets, the children return to the hidden room, and Sharla and Howard again share sinister glances.
47	"It Begins!"; Transliteration: "Hajimeru zo!" (Japanese: 始めるぞ!)	Keiko Oyamada, Hak-Bin Lee	Written by : Yoshifumi Fukushima; Storyboarded by : Masakatsu Iijima	Teiichi Takiguchi, Seong-Wan Kim	September 16, 2004
Outside in the forest, Sharla stands communicating with a drone, agreeing to continue observing Luna. Elsewhere, Luna senses the drone, but when she and Kaoru run there, they only find Sharla. Worried, they head back to the hidden room. Together, they come up with a plan to reach Survive's chamber and accost the computer directly. The security drones act largely autonomously, guided by the sensors in each section – Shingo and Chako will use a modified chip to disable the sensors, meaning that so long as they stay out of direct sight of the drones, they won't be able to detect the children. Luna and Kaoru go with them for defense. The plan is succeeding, and they have progressed much of the way up the ship, but back in the hidden room, Sharla claims to see something in the first section they cleared, and Howard goes to investigate. Pretending to look around, he places his hand – which glows blue – over Shingo's chip, which alerts Survive. Suddenly, all of the modified chips start overloading, bringing the drones, and the children flee back to the hidden room. When Tako determines the signal that alerted Survive came from the first cleared section, Tako, Chako and Shingo immediately suspect Howard and Sharla. Chako and Luna set a trap to trip up Howard and Sharla, and Sharla falls for it. Howard and Sharla overpower Luna and flee the hidden room.
48	"You Are Not Being Yourself"; Transliteration: "Anata wa Anata ja Nai" (Japanese: あなたはあなたじゃない)	Yoshihide Yuuzumi, Byung-Gil Yang	Written by : Shōji Yonemura; Storyboarded by : Yoshihide Yuuzumi	Yūko Sobu, Ki-Duk Park	September 30, 2004
Chako reveals to the others what they suspected, that Howard and Sharla were being controlled by Survive. Luna and Kaoru follow Howard and Sharla, but encounter drones trying to force their way into the hidden room. They return to regroup, but realizing there are no more safe places to hide, they decide to attempt a frontal assault on Survive's room. Shingo finds two infrared inhibitor particle nebulizers which they can use to confuse the drone's sensors in the same way that Howard's mirror worked earlier. In Survive's room, Survive tells Howard and Sharla that he needs to obtain Luna's power for himself. The children escape the hidden room, and split into two groups for a two-pronged assault and ride separate lifts to the top of the spaceship. The nebulizers work on the drones, but Sharla confronts one of the groups with a laser pistol. Bell distracts her with his jacket, and then knocks her out. In the other group, the drones destroy Kaoru's nebulizer, but Luna's power flares up and disables the drones. They enter Survive's room, where they find Howard lying on the floor, but when they approach, he stands up and holds a laser pistol to Adam's head. Survive starts to scan Luna to determine the source of her power, and the other group arrives with Sharla. Survive tells Luna he caused the quicksand in order to take Howard and Sharla, and has been using them for various experiments since. Luna becomes angry at the callous use of her friends, and her aura changes from pink to dark red, but Adam brings her back to her senses. As Survive continues to taunt her, she remembers her father's words on terraforming, and her aura turns pink again. The children all appear in a strange landscape, where they call out to Howard and Sharla, and they remember all the things that happened to them since they arrived. In Survive's room, the children are all surrounded by a whirling pink field. Luna gathers her energies and those of her friends in her hand, and blasts the nanomachines out of Howard and Sharla's bodies, returning them to normal. Survive admires Luna's power, but as the children have another tearful reunion, an alert sounds, and the room starts shaking.
49	"At This Rate, This Planet..."; Transliteration: "Kono Mama dato Kono Hoshi ga..." (Japanese: このままだとこの星が...)	Yūichirō Yano	Written by : Yuka Yamada; Storyboarded by : Yūichirō Yano	Chie Nishizawa	October 7, 2004
Survive shows the children images of earthquakes causing damage all over the continent, but he cannot determine the cause of them. He explains that he needs Luna's power to save the planet, even if he has to absorb her to get it. The children discuss escaping the planet, but Survive threatens them with a huge swarm of drones. Luna offers to investigate the cause of the imminent destruction in exchange for their safety – though Survive is supremely logical and has access to all the data, the humans have the ability to see connections and make intuitive deductions. Survive agrees, and the children split up to investigate – Shingo and Chako go over the data, and Tako takes the others in an anti-gravity sled to do field investigation in the volcano under the main terraforming machine. They ride an elevator down an investigation shaft, taking samples of rocks over the last thousand years, and a magma sample, but another earthquake strikes and the elevator's mechanics fail, including the refrigeration system. Held in place only by the emergency brakes, the children are at risk of burning to death from the heat of the magma, but Shingo comes up with the idea of exploding the refrigeration system's compressed air tanks to push the elevator up the shaft. The plan is successful, and the drones are able to hold the lift in place at the top of the shaft just long enough for all the children to climb out. Analyzing the samples back on the spaceship, Shingo, Chako and Tako discover that the planet suffered a large change in gravity a thousand years ago, and they realize the cause of the problems is outside the planet – the gravity storm which brought the children's shuttle and the Orion. Suddenly, an alarm sounds.
50	"Because We Love This Planet"; Transliteration: "Kono Hoshi ga Suki Dakara" (Japanese: この星が好きだから)	Keiko Oyamada, Hak-Bin Lee	Written by : Yoshifumi Fukushima; Storyboarded by : Toshiyuki Shimazu	Teiichi Takiguchi, Seong-Wan Kim	October 14, 2004
Survive has detected the gravity storm approaching, on a direct collision course with the planet, due to arrive in three days. Shingo thinks they can save the planet by using the gravity control unit on Survive's spaceship to create an inverse gravity field, cancelling out the gravity storm. With Survive's computing power, the children test a simulation using the anti-gravity sled's smaller unit, and are successful. However, since the plan requires detaching the gravity control unit from Survive's ship and sending it into the storm, Howard and Menori object, saying they should use the ship to return home while they can – there are no other spaceships or sufficiently powerful gravity control units on the planet. The other children agree that they have to save the planet, and Howard storms off. Sharla follows Howard into the forest outside, while Kaoru, Shingo, Chako and Tako go to check the condition of the ship, and Bell talks with Menori. Survive wants to carry out the plan immediately, but Luna convinces him to wait – she knows there's no way the other children, even Howard or Menori, would want to see the planet destroyed. However, another earthquake strikes, and a crack opens up in the forest, swallowing Howard and Sharla. They catch themselves on a ledge, and walk along it, hoping to find a way out. They find the mother pague, who had also fallen into the crack, and Sharla bandages its injured leg. The rest of the children notice that Howard and Sharla haven't returned, and go looking for them. In the crack, the ledge crumbles, dropping the mother pague into the crack, but the children turn up in the anti-gravity sled just in time, and catch her. They return the pague to her child, and they all agree there's no way they can just let the planet be destroyed.
51	"We're Not Going So We Can Die"; Transliteration: "Shinu Tame ni Iku n ja Nai" (Japanese: 死ぬために行くんじゃない)	Yasunaga Tsuji	Written by : Shōji Yonemura; Storyboarded by : Kazuhide Tomonaga	Keiko Nakaji	October 21, 2004
The children spend time preparing for departure – learning how to fly the ship, testing systems, ensuring everything is ready. On their last night before they start the mission, the children all gather in the forest by the lake, and remember the events that brought them to this point. Howard worries that it might be their last night, but Kaoru tells him they're not going so they can die – it's so they can live. The next day, they evacuate all of the coffins from the ship, leaving Adam and Tako behind to take care of them and the planet, and then prepare for takeoff. With Kaoru as pilot and commander, Shingo on engineering, Chako looking after the computer, Bell on power systems, Menori and Luna on flight plan and navigation, Howard on life support, and Sharla on communications, the takeoff happens without a hitch. Suddenly, the gravity storm's power level increases. The children make plans to compensate, but Survive, not willing to risk himself on a plan that now has only a small probability of success, shuts down their control panels and starts taking the ship back to the planet. Luna runs to Survive's room to talk with him directly, telling him that even if their plan may not work if they try, the planet is guaranteed to be destroyed if they don't try. To give him courage, she agrees to let Survive absorb her. He does so, and her aura changes from pink to blue, and Survive's circuits power up to full. Luna explains to Survive the meaning of his name, and he gives control back to the children. They get back on course, but the gravity storm's energy increases again, causing something on the outside of the ship to explode.
52	"To The Place Where Everyone Is"; Transliteration: "Minna no Tokoro e" (Japanese: みんなのところへ)	Yūichirō Yano	Written by : Shōji Yonemura; Storyboarded by : Yūichirō Yano	Teiichi Takiguchi	October 28, 2004
Shingo realizes that it is no longer possible to detach the gravity control unit from the ship – to stop the storm, they'll have to take the whole ship into the storm. Kaoru and Bell each volunteer to do it alone while the others escape, but the rest remind them they agreed to do it together. However, Luna, still with Survive, activates their seatbelts and ejects the entire bridge from the ship. She farewells each of them individually, then takes the ship into the gravity storm. In the storm, Survive matches the storm's gravity field, and struggles to produce an inverse field as a blue aura spreads from the ship. The storm starts to overwhelm the ship, but as Luna pours more of her will and determination into it, the aura turns gold, then rainbow. However, it's too much for the ship, and it explodes, unable to destroy the gravity storm. However, on the planet, Tako realizes they were able to change the storm's course by enough to avoid the planet. As the other children grieve for Luna, she finds herself floating in a strange space. Her father appears and congratulates her for a job well done. Promising her they'll meet again, he sends her back to the real world. She awakens with a start inside a nanomachine shield projected by Survive, floating in space. With his mission complete and his support equipment gone, Survive charges Luna to continue his work and dissipates. Suddenly, the ships of the evacuation fleet that left the planet a thousand years ago appear, having received the message sent by Adam's parents and their colleagues. They give the children a spaceship which they can use to fly through the gravity storm before it disappears in order to return home, while Adam and Tako remain with his people to look after the planet. Menori gives Adam her violin, promising to return someday. As they fly away, they realize they never gave a name to the planet, and without hesitation Sharla names it Planet Survive. The ship enters the gravity storm. A number of years later, Kaoru has become a shuttle pilot, Bell has become a planetary settlement worker, Sharla has become a writer and has written the story of their adventures, Shingo has become a ship's mechanic, Menori has become her father's secretary and is working to open trade with Planet Survive, and Howard has become a famous actor. Luna and Chako, however, are in the ruins of Paris on Earth, using what they learnt on Planet Survive to revitalize and terraform the planet. Today, for the first time, Luna can take her helmet off and breathe the outside air, but they still have a lot of work to do.
