= Nao (given name) =

- Gender: Unisex

Origin
- Origin: Japanese
- Meaning: many different meanings depending on the kanji used

Other names
- Related names: Naoko; Naomi

Nao (なお, ナオ) is a common feminine Japanese given name which is occasionally used by males. It is also a short name for Naoko, Naomi, Naoto, etc.

== Written forms ==
Nao can be written using different kanji characters and can mean:

- 直, "honest"
- 尚, "esteem"
- 巨, "giant"
- 奈緒, "Nara, cord"
- 菜緒, "greens, cord"
- 奈央, "Nara, center"

The name can also be written in hiragana be katakana.

== People ==
- Nao (ナオ), a drummer from Visual Kei band Alice Nine
- Nao (born 1985), Japanese singer and former lead singer of the band fripSide
- Nao (奈緒, born 1995), Japanese actress
- Nao Asahi (朝日 奈央, born 1994), Japanese tarento
- Nao Deguchi (出口 なお, 1837–1918), founder of Oomoto
- Nao Eguchi (江口 直生, born 1992), Japanese footballer
- Nao Furuhata (古畑 奈和, born 1996), member of the girl group SKE48
- Nao Hibino (日比野 菜緒, born 1994), Japanese pro tennis player
- Nao Higashihama (東浜 巨, born 1993 ), Japanese baseball pitcher
- Nao Horomura (幌村 尚; born 1999), Japanese male swimmer
- Nao Kawakita (川北 奈緒, born 1975), drummer and backup vocalist of Japanese rock band Maximum the Hormone
- Nao Kodaira (小平 奈緒, born 1986), Japanese Olympic long-track speed skater
- Nao Kosaka (小坂 菜緒, born 2002), Japanese idol, model, actress and member of the girl group Hinatazaka46
- Nao Shohtoku (小坂 菜緒, born 2001), Japanese icon, and actress, and member of the girl group GNG WHT
- Nao Matsushita (松下 奈緒, born 1985), Japanese actress and pianist
- Nao Nagasawa (長澤 奈央, born 1984), Japanese actress, singer and model
- Nao Nagasawa (長澤 奈央, born 1971), Japanese voice actress
- Nao Oikawa (及川 奈央, born 1981), Japanese AV idol and tarento
- Nao Ōmori (大森 南朋, born 1972), Japanese actor
- Nao Saejima (冴島 奈緒, 1968–2013), Japanese AV idol
- Nao Suzuki (鈴木 奈央; born 1997), Japanese cyclist
- Nao Takamori (高森 奈緒, born 1973), Japanese voice idol
- Nao Takasugi (1922–2009), Japanese-American politician
- Nao Tamura (田村 奈央), a Japanese voice actress
- Nao Tōyama (東山 奈央, born 1992), a Japanese pop solo artist and former leader of Buzy (band)
- Nao Ueki (植木 南央, born 1997), member of the girl group HKT48.
- Nao Watanabe (渡邊 奈央), Japanese singer
- Nao Yasuda (安田 奈央, born 1990), former member of Kamen Rider Girls
- Nao Yazawa (谷沢 直), Japanese manga artist

== Characters ==
- Nao, a character in the manga series Inu Neko Jump!
- Nao Chikura (名央), a character in the manga series Hatsukoi Limited
- Nao Egokoro (菜緒), a character from the visual novel Your Turn to Die
- Nao Kamiya (奈緒), a character in the mobile game and anime The Idolmaster Cinderella Girls
- Nao Kanzaki (ナオ), the main protagonist in the manga and live actions series, Liar Game
- Nao Makinoha (奈緒), a character from the shōnen fantasy manga Midori No Hibi
- Nao Mariota Pryderi, a female character in the MMORPG Mabinogi
- Nao Midorikawa, a character in Smile PreCure!, the 9th season in the Pretty Cure franchise
- Nao Morisaki (七央), a character from the erotic visual novel Soul Link
- Nao Okuda (直), a character in the manga series K-On!
- Nao Tomori (奈緒), a character in the anime series Charlotte
- Nao Toramaru (虎丸 尚), a female character in the action-comedy manga and anime series Sakamoto Days
- Nao Yasumori (奈緒), a female character in the anime and manga series Shiki (novel series)
- Nao Yuuki (奈緒), a female character in the anime series My-HiME
- Nao Yoshikawa (菜緒), the main character in the manga and live action series Good Morning Call
- Nao, a female character from the video game Omega Strikers
