= Kashima Shin-ryū =

Japanese martial art

Kashima-Shinryū
- Ko-ryū

Foundation
- Founder: Kunii Kagetsugu; Matsumoto Bizen-no-kami
- Date founded: c. 1500
- Period founded: Middle Muromachi period (1336 to 1573)

Current information
- Current headmaster: Shihanke: Seki Humitake (19th generation); Sōke: Kunii Masakatsu (21st generation)

Arts taught
- Art: Description
- Kenjutsu 剣術: Sword techniques
- Battōjutsu 抜刀術: Techniques for unsheathing the sword
- Bōjutsu 棒術: Staff techniques
- Hobakujutsu: Ropes and restraint techniques
- Jojutsu 杖術: Short staff techniques
- Jujutsu 柔術: Hybrid art, unarmed or with minor weapons
- Kaikenjutsu: Dagger techniques
- Kenpo: Unarmed striking techniques
- Naginatajutsu 長刀術: Glaive techniques
- Sojutsu 槍術: Spear techniques
- Shurikenjutsu 手裏剣術: Throwing knife techniques

Ancestor schools
- Kashima no Tachi

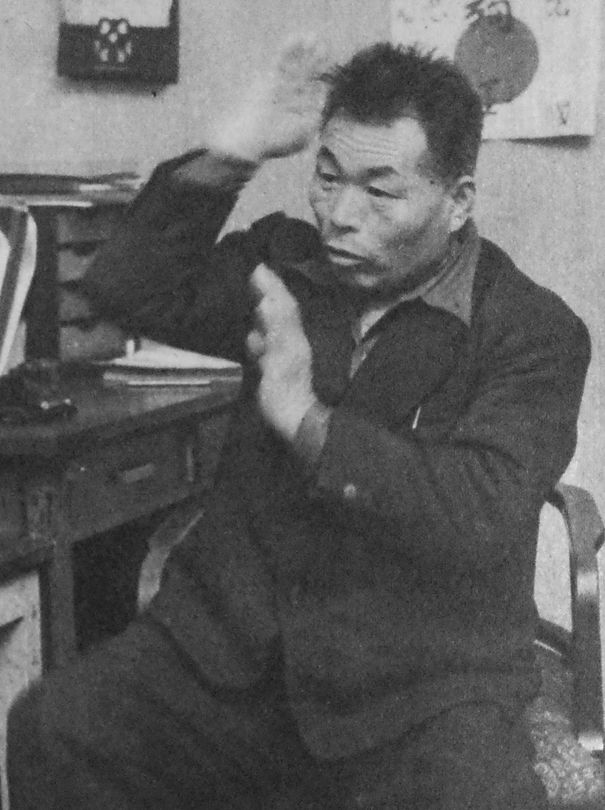
Kunii Zen'ya, former leader of the school, in 1953.

Kashima-Shinryū (鹿島神流) is a Japanese koryū martial art whose foundation dates back to the early 16th century. The art developed some notoriety in Japan during the early 20th century under Kunii Zen'ya (1894-1966), the 18th generation sōke (headmaster). The current sōke is the 21st generation, Kunii Masakatsu. While the line is still headed by the Kunii family, the title of sōke is now largely honorific, and the responsibility for the preservation and transmission of the ryūha now lies in the shihanke line, currently represented by the 19th generation, Seki Humitake.

== History ==
The characters Kashima 鹿島 are in honor of the deity enshrined in the Kashima Shrine located in Kashima, Ibaraki Prefecture, who is supposed to have provided the divine inspiration (shin 神) for Kashima Shin-ryū. The earliest elements of the school are credited to Kashima no Tachi, fencing techniques passed down by the priests of the Kashima Shrine following their creation by Kuninazu no Mahito in the 7th century. In Kashima Shinryū lore, Matsumoto Bizen-no-kami, assisted by Kunii Kagetsugu, refined and expounded on Kashima no Tachi into the basis of the modern school. After this development, they went their separate ways. Kunii Kagetsugu began what is now named the sōke lineage (and is credited as the 1st generation of such), based in Iwaki province and handed down through the Kunii family line. Conversely, Matsumoto Bizen-no-kami taught a large number of students, creating a number of martial lineages, often with characters reading shinkage in the name. In 1780, the 12th generation sōke, Kunii Taizen Minamoto no Ritsuzan attained mastery in Jikishinkage-ryū, studying under Ono Seiemon Taira no Shigemasa. As Jikishinkage-ryū also traced its founding back to Matsumoto Bizen-no-kami, but passed down through Kamiizumi Ise-no-kami Fujiwara-no-Nobutsuna rather than the Kunii family, this lineage is recognized within Kashima Shinryū as the shihanke line, crediting Matsumoto Bizen-no-kami as the 1st generation. The sōke and shihanke lines remained united within the Kunii family until Kunii Zen'ya appointed Seki Humitake as his successor and the 19th generation shihanke while leaving his wife, Kunii Shizu, to carry on as the 19th generation sōke.

Despite the similarity of names, Kashima-Shinryū is of only passing relation to Kashima Shintō-ryū. While both schools regard Kashima no Tachi as a major antecedent, Kashima Shintō-ryū claims as founder Tsukahara Bokuden, who independently generated a different refinement on Kashima no Tachi than that of Matsumoto Bizen-no-Kami.

== Ranks ==
The following licenses exist under the Kashima-Shinryū Federation of Martial Sciences:

rank	clothing	requirements
Kirigami 切紙	white belt	Kenjutsu: kihon tachi, uradachi Jūjutsu: Reiki no ho, idori, tachiwaza (Kirigami is a prerequisite for Kashima Shin-ryū membership)
Shomokuroku 小目録	white belt, black hakama	Kenjutsu: Aishin kumitachi, Jissen tachigumi, Seigan tachiai Jūjutsu: reikinage, nagewaza
Shoden 初伝	black belt, black hakama	Kenjutsu: Kassen tachi, Tsubazeri, Taoshiuchi Jūjutsu: Kumiwaza gusokudori, Toritegaeshi (selectively), kaiken/tantojutsu
Chūden 中伝	black belt, black hakama	
Okuden 奥伝	black belt, white hakama	
Kaiden 皆伝	black belt, white hakama	
Menkyo kaiden 免許皆伝	white belt, white hakama	Disciple has mastered the system

== Locations ==
Kashima-Shinryū can be studied in Japan (including Tokyo, Kyoto, and Tsukuba), and also in the United States (including Los Angeles, Athens, and Bozeman) and in Europe (including Breda, Dresden, Frankfurt, Helsinki, Ljubljana, Geneva, London, and Tampere).
