= Tantojutsu =

Japanese knife fighting systems

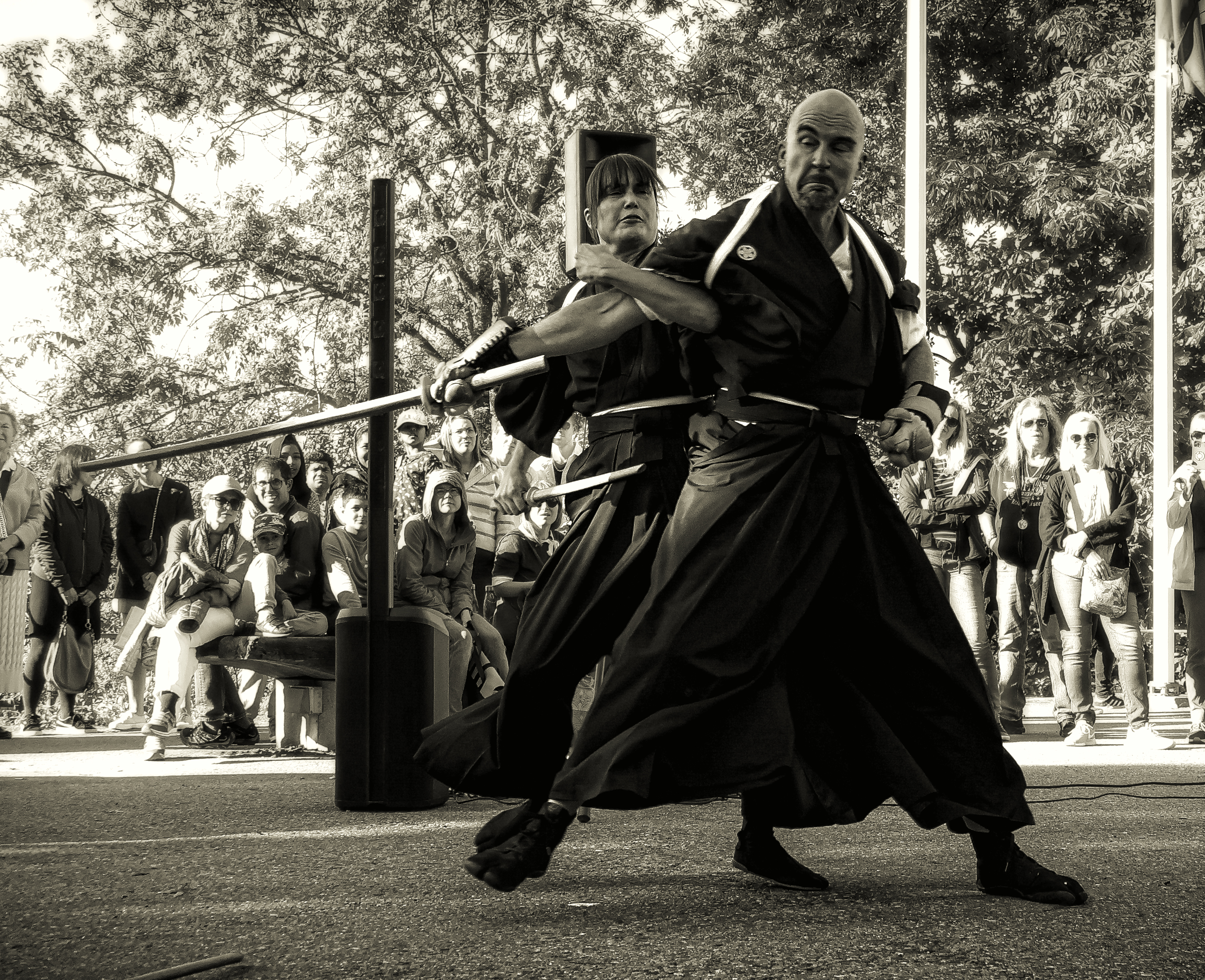
Tantōjutsu

Tantōjutsu (短刀術) is a Japanese term for a variety of traditional Japanese knife fighting systems that used the tantō (短刀), as a knife or dagger. Historically, many women used a version of the tantō, called the kaiken, for self-defense, but warrior women in pre-modern Japan learned one of the tantōjutsu arts to fight in battle.

== Martial arts that practise tantōjutsu ==
Tantō with blunt wooden or plastic blades are used to practice martial arts. Metal blades can be used in more advanced training and in demonstrations. Styles that use tantō:

Budō (Gendai):

- Aikido
- Shorinji Kempo

Bugei:

- Yanagi-ryū Aiki Bugei (Yoshida-ha Shidare Yanagi-ryū)
- Ogawa-ryu Bugei

Bujutsu (Koryū):

- Kashima Shin-ryū (this ryūha uses term Kaikenjutsu)
- Takamura-ha Shindo Yoshin-ryu
- Tendō-ryū

== See also ==
- Wakizashi
