= Naoto Ueno =

American medical professor

Naoto T. Ueno
- Born: March 29, 1964 (age 62); Kyoto, Japan

Academic background
- Doctoral advisor: Mien-Chie Hung

Academic work
- Institutions: University of Hawaiʻi Cancer Center

Naoto T. Ueno (born March 1964, Kyoto, Japan) is Director of the University of Hawaiʻi (Mānoa) Cancer Center, one of the 74 NCI National Cancer Centers. He was formerly Professor of Medicine at The University of Texas MD Anderson Cancer Center, and was also a visiting professor with the Keio University. Ueno's research is in the area of inflammatory breast cancer and the molecular mechanism of metastasis and tumorigenicity.

He is a breast medical oncologist who specializes in inflammatory, triple-negative, and metastatic breast cancer. He is best known for his preclinical development of E1A gene therapy and multiple preclinical developments, which led to novel clinical trials related to inflammatory and triple-negative breast cancer.

Ueno moved from Texas to the University of Hawaiʻi to be director in December 2022. He also practices at Queen's Medical Center and Kapiolani Children and Women's Hospital.

Dr. Ueno studies cancer metastasis, MAPK/EGFR pathways, and cancer microenvironment. He previously was the executive director of the Morgan Welch Inflammatory Breast Cancer Program and Clinic and Section Chief of the Translational Breast Cancer Research at the Department of Breast Medical Oncology at the Anderson Cancr Center.

He is the founder of the Japan TeamOnclogy Program and CancerX.

== Awards ==
- 1995-1996 Clinical Fellow Research Award, MD Anderson Cancer Center
- 1996 Cancer Research Achievement Award, MD Anderson Cancer Center
- 1996 Houston Endowment, Jesse H. Jones Fellowship in Cancer Education
- 1996 Outstanding Achievement in Cancer Research Award, Pharmacia and Upjohn
- 1998 American Association Cancer Research-Glaxo Wellcome Oncology Clinical Research Scholar Award for Promising Translation or Clinical Research, Glaxo Wellcome
- 2008 6th Robert M. Chamberlain Distinguished Mentor Award Nomination (Top Three Finalist), MD Anderson
- 2011 Amgen Basic Research Award, 2nd Prize for Mentoring, MDACC
- 2013 Regent's Outstanding Teaching Award, University of Texas
- 2013 Bradley Stuart Beller Special Merit ASCO Merit Award for Hiroko Masusda, MD, PhD (Mentee)
- 2018 Rune for the Cure Foundation. Unknown Hero Award.
