= Nahoko Kinoshita =

Japanese actress

- Born: 13 November 1980 (age 44); Osaka Prefecture, Japan
- Occupation: Actress
- Years active: 2000—present

Nahoko Kinoshita (木下 菜穂子, Kinoshita Nahoko, born 13 November 1980, in Osaka Prefecture) is a Japanese actress who specializes in voice acting. She is a member of the Haiyuza Troupe.

== Filmography ==
=== Stage performances ===
- Neal Simon Memoirs (2001)
- Tomodachi (2002)
- Boku no Tōkyō Nikki (2002)
- Kamome (2002)
- Tartuffe (2004)

=== Voice acting ===
- Uninhabited Planet Survive! - Sharla

=== Dubbing roles ===
- Curse of the Golden Flower - Jiang Chan (Li Man)
