= Zenya Kunii =

Japanese martial artist

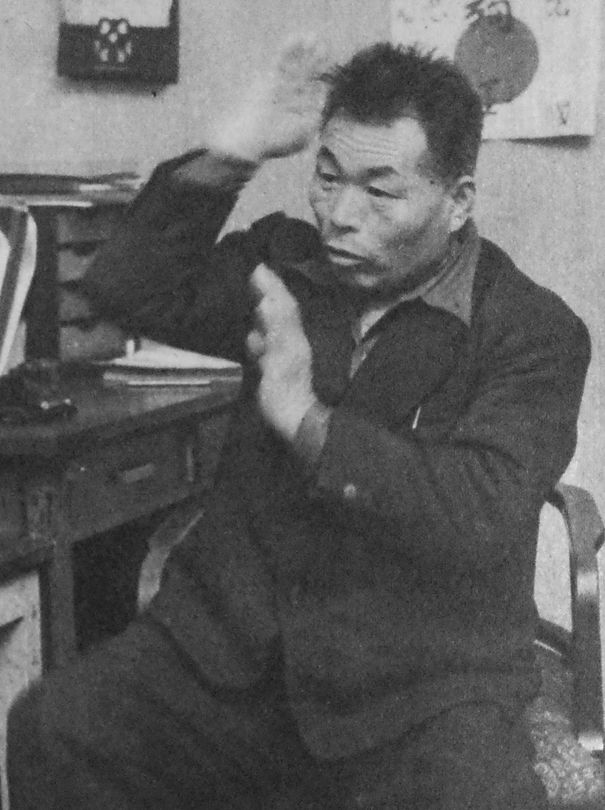
- Born: January 20, 1894; Iwaki, Fukushima, Japan
- Died: August 17, 1966 (aged 72); Japan
- Native name: 国井善弥
- Nationality: Japanese
- Style: Kashima Shin-ryū; Shinkage-ryū; Maniwa Nen-ryū
- Teachers: Eizo Kunii; Shinsaku Kunii; Masanoshin Sasaki; Kuniyasu Suhara

Zenya Kunii (国井善弥, Kunii Zenya; January 20, 1894 – August 16, 1966) was a Japanese martial artist. He was 18th soke of the Kashima Shin-ryū school. Known as the "Saint of the Sword" and the "Modern Miyamoto Musashi", he was held as one of the greatest traditional martial artists of the 20th century in Japan, as well as one of the most controversial figures in their community.

== Biography ==
Born Michiyuki Kunii, he started training as a child in his family style, Kashima Shin-ryū, under his grandfather Shinsaku and father Eizo. He had his first real fighting experience at 16, when thieves broke into their family property in a time of famine. Two of the thieves turned out to be accomplished kenjutsuka and attacked him with their katanas, but the young Kunii responded in kind and cut them both down. Three years later, by Eizo's mediation, he expanded his knowledge by training Shinkage-ryū under Masanoshin Sasaki and Maniwa Nen-ryū under Kuniyasu Suhara.

With the outbreak of World War I, Kunii was drafted into the Imperial Japanese Army and appointed martial arts master at the Toyama military school in Toyama, Tokyo. After the war, he opened his own dojo in the Kita district. He put a street sign welcoming the practice of dojoyaburi, which he performed himself against other schools, and legend claims he never suffered a single loss, defeating over the years many kenjutsuka, judoka, karateka, wrestlers and practitioners of ninjutsu. In spite of this renown as a challenger, he came to be seen as a "heretic" in the Japanese martial arts community by his belligerence and quickness to criticize other styles.

According to a chronicle, during the 1920s Kunii interrupted an exhibition event featuring Japanese judoka and a French boxer, indignant that the Japanese failed to best the foreigner. He jumped on the ring and defeated the boxer himself with a single strike to the head. After the fight, a present French naval officer advanced on him while drawing a gun, so Kunii drew a knife in turn, preparing to die while hoping to take the Frenchman with him, but his opponent dropped the weapon and ran away.

In the early 1950s, Kunii engaged in a dispute against aikido. One of Aikikai's top shihan challenged Kunii, but when the day came, the aikidoka failed to appear. Fellow Aikikai member Kisaburo Osawa went personally to Kunii's house to negotiate a peaceful solution, which earned much respect from Kunii.

After Japan's defeat in World War II and the establishment of the Supreme Commander for the Allied Powers Douglas MacArthur on the country, Kunii was required to participate in a special challenge by Minister of State Junzo Sasamori. Kunii fought as a kendo representative against a bayonet fighting instructor of the United States Marine Corps, each with his designated weapon, and despite being over twenty years older than his opponent, the Japanese won easily. In 1952, kendo was legalized in Japan and the All Japan Kendo Federation was founded.

In 1964, Kunii appointed Humitake Seki his successor after Seki defeated a Shotokan 5th dan karateka and an 8th dan black belt aikidoka in challenge matches on his orders. Kunii himself would die two years later, in 1966. He is buried in the Shozoin Shinto temple in Iwaki.
