= Matsumoto Ichiyō =

Japanese painter (1893–1952)

Matsumoto Ichiyō (梥本 一洋; 1893–1952) was a Japanese painter active during the Taishō and Shōwa eras. He was born in Kyoto into a family of yūzen fabric dyers. He graduated from the Kyoto Municipal Special School of Painting in 1915, and then continued his studies with Yamamoto Shunkyo (1871–1933).

The Honolulu Museum of Art, the National Museum of Modern Art, Kyoto, and the National Museum of Modern Art, Tokyo are among the public collections holding his paintings.

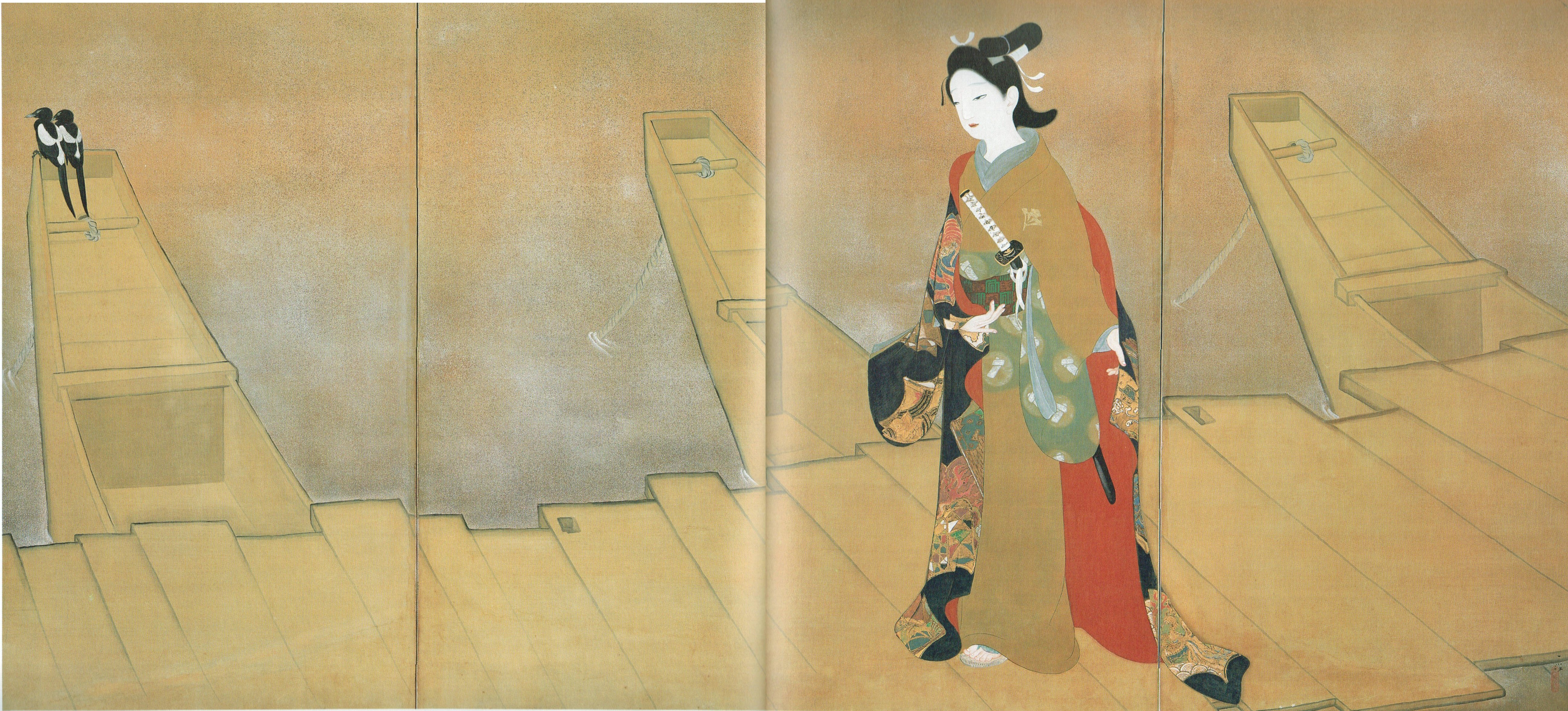
Walking on a Bridge by Matsumoto Ichiyo, pair of screens, Honolulu Museum of Art
