= Nahoko Hishiyama =

- 菱山 南帆子
- Born: 1989 (age 36–37); Hachiōji, Tokyo Metropolis, Japan

Nahoko Hishiyama (Japanese: 菱山 南帆子; born 1989, Hachiōji) is a Japanese feminist, constitutional protection activist, and anti-war activist.

== Early life ==
Hishiyama's mother was a sign language interpreter, and her father was self-employed. As a result, Hishiyama was exposed early on to the Deaf community, and learned sign language.

Hishiyama's first brush with activism was in the fifth grade, when she gathered some of her classmates to challenge a teacher for using ableist language. That same year, she refused to sing the Japanese national anthem, Kimigayo, in school, after disagreeing with its lyrics.

== Activism ==
Hishiyama began speaking out about anti-war causes in 2003, after the onset of the Iraq War and Japan's announcement of their support for it.

In 2016, Hishiyama was one of many activists who protested proposed security legislation that would allow Japan's Self-Defense Forces to be sent overseas to engage in combat, in violation of the Japanese constitution. She is the deputy secretary general of Yurusu na! Kenpo Kaiaku Shimin Renrakukai (Citizens’ Liaison Group against Constitutional Reform), an organization which aims to preserve the constitution in the face of such legislation. She has also protested against the expansion of the Japanese military and the presence of U.S. bases in Japan.

Hishiyama has expressed support for the hypothetical recognition of crimes against Koreans by the Japanese government.

Hishiyama has received death threats and harassment for her feminist and constitutional activism, including her involvement with the feminist group Online Safety for Sisters.

In 2022, Hishiyama protested the state funeral of assassinated prime minister Shinzo Abe.

== Writing ==
In 2017, Hishiyama released a memoir on her experiences, entitled Called the girl who calls the storm – A book about how to live as a citizen movement (嵐を呼ぶ少女とよばれて―市民運動という生きかた 単行本). She also writes an online newsletter, entitled Neko to Toramega.

== Personal life ==
Hishiyama works at a welfare facility in Hachiōji.
