= Kohei Matsumoto (footballer, born 1989) =

Japanese footballer (born 1989)

Kohei Matsumoto 松本 光平
Personal information
- Date of birth: 3 May 1989 (age 37)
- Place of birth: Osaka, Osaka, Japan
- Height: 1.73 m (5 ft 8 in)
- Position: Defender

Team information
- Current team: Kochi United
- Number: 35

Senior career*
Years	Team	Apps	(Gls)
2025–	Kochi United	0	(0)
- * Club domestic league appearances and goals as of 27 January 2025, 18:22 (UTC)

Kohei Matsumoto (松本 光平, Matsumoto Kohei; born 3 May 1989) is a Japanese footballer who play as a defender or midfielder and currently play for Kochi United.

== Early life ==
Matsumoto is a native of Osaka, Japan. He started playing football in kindergarten.

== Youth career ==
As a junior high student, Matsumoto joined the youth academy of Japanese side Cerezo Osaka, where he was teammates with future Japan internationals Yoichiro Kakitani and Yusuke Maruhashi, before joining the youth academy of rivals Gamba Osaka.

== Senior career ==
In 2019, Matsumoto signed for New Caledonian side Hienghène Sport, where he played in the 2019 FIFA Club World Cup. In 2020, he signed for New Zealand side Auckland City after he undergoing eye surgery due to an accident.

On 5 January 2025, Matsumoto signed with J3 promoted club, Kochi United for 2025 season.

== Style of play ==
Matsumoto mainly operates as a defender or midfielder.

== Personal life ==
Matsumoto is the son of Kimie Matsumoto, a nutritionist, and Toshihiro Matsumoto, a home renovator.
