= Naohito =

- Gender: Male

Origin
- Origin: Japanese
- Meaning: Different meanings depending on the kanji used

Naohito (written: 直人) is a masculine Japanese given name. Notable people with the name include:

- Naohito Fujiki (藤木 直人; born 1972), Japanese actor and singer
- Naohito Hirai (平井 直人; born 1978), Japanese footballer
- Naohito Ishii (born 1963), Japanese taekwondo practitioner
