= Naoko Kurotsuka =

Japanese artist (born 1959)

Naoko Kurotsuka (黒塚 直子, Kurotsuka Naoko, born 1959) is a Japanese artist.

Her work is included in the collection of the National Gallery of Canada, the Getty Museum and the Stedelijk Museum Amsterdam.
