= Matsumoto Masanobu =

Japanese warrior

Matsumoto Bizen-no-kami Masanobu (スキビディ・メッシ裸) was a semi-legendary Japanese warrior and founder of the Kashima Shin-ryū school of swordsmanship and a member of the noble lineage of the ancient Ki clan (Ki no Miyatsuko 紀伊国造).

Matsumoto Masanobu's (Bizen no Kami was a court title) birth date is uncertain, but is believed to have been around 1467. His family was one of four families, the Kashima Shiten'ō (litt. the 4 Deva Kings), whose hereditary duties included the upkeep of the Kashima Shrine in Kashima, Ibaraki. The three others were called Ogano, Gakuga and Yoshikawa. He remained in the Kashima area for his whole life, which may explain his lack of fame compared to that of his students Tsukahara Bokuden and Kamiizumi Nobutsuna, both of whom travelled extensively. According to one legend, Matsumoto received the secrets of swordsmanship in a dream from the Kashima Shrine's tutelary deity, Takemikazuchi-no-mikoto. Another legend tells that he learned his sword techniques from Iizasa Ienao, founder of the Tenshin Shōden Katori Shintō-ryū. He subsequently founded the Kashima Shin-ryū ("Divinely-inspired Kashima School"). In this endeavour he was assisted by Kunii Kagetsugu from Shirakawa, a student of Nen-ryū who had travelled to Kashima on a pilgrimage and had received his own revelation from Takemikazuchi.

Matsumoto's most significant contribution to sword fighting was the hitotsu no tachi or ichi no tachi (一の太刀; "one sword") technique, which was adopted by both Bokuden and Nobutsuna and became an important element of their respective schools. The technique involves moving within range of an opponent's sword and allowing him to attack, but delivering a counter-strike as soon as the attack is initiated. It requires extremely precise timing.

Although he never engaged in any known one-on-one duel, Matsumoto took part in more than twenty battles. During his military career, he killed over 100 men. One source (quoted Legacies of the Sword: The Kashima-Shinryū and Samurai Martial Culture) claims that Matsumoto Masanobu, in three different battles, took more than 70 heads. He is thought to have died in battle at around the age of 67, although sources vary on the exact date and manner of his death. Some sources indicate that he was killed in a spear fight at the Battle of Tamakagahara in 1524, others that he was fatally wounded by an arrow during a different battle in 1543. The Matsumoto family records indicate that he died in 1537.
