= Naoko Matsumoto =

Japanese archaeologist

Naoko Matsumoto is a Professor in the Department of Archaeology at Okayama University. Her research covers the areas of cognitive archaeology, gender archaeology and the Jomon period.

== Education ==
In 1998 she received a received her D.Litt. from Kyushu University.

== Career ==
Matsumoto has excavated at several Jomon and Yayoi sites in the Kyushu and Chugoku districts of western Japan. She is on the Advisory Committee for the Shanghai Archaeology Forum.

== Selected publications ==
- Matsumoto, N. 2018. Changing relationship between the dead and the living in Japanese prehistory. Philosophical Transactions of the Royal Society B: Biological Sciences. 373, 1754, 20170272
- Matsumoto, N. 2018. Japan: The Earliest Evidence of Complex Technology for Creating Durable Coloured Goods. Open Archaeology. 4, 1, p. 206-216.
- Matsumoto, N., Bessho, H. and Tomii, M. (eds) 2011. Coexistence and Cultural Transmission in East Asia. Left Coast Press.
