= Ōtsuka =

Ōtsuka (大塚 or 大束; lit. "large mound" or "large bundle" (respectively)) is a Japanese surname. Alternative transliterations include Otsuka and Ohtsuka. Notable people with the surname include:

- Ai Otsuka (大塚 愛, born 1982), Japanese pop singer from the Kansai region
- Akinori Otsuka (大塚 晶則, born 1972), Japanese baseball player
- Akio Ōtsuka (大塚 明夫, born 1959), Japanese voice actor, son of Chikao Ohtsuka
- Alexander Otsuka (Real name Takashi Otsuka) (大塚 崇, born 1971), Japanese professional wrestler and mixed martial artist
- Chihiro Otsuka (大塚 ちひろ, born 1986), Japanese actress
- Chikao Ohtsuka (大塚 周夫, 1929–2015), Japanese voice actor, father of Akio Ōtsuka
- Gen Ōtsuka (大束 元, 1912–1992), Japanese photographer
- Hirofumi Otsuka (大塚 博文, born 1947), Japanese speed skater
- Hironori Ōtsuka (大塚 博紀, 1892–1982), creator and first Grand Master of the Japanese karate style Wado-ryu
- Hōchū Ōtsuka (大塚 芳忠, born 1954), Japanese voice actor
- James Otsuka (1921–1984), war tax resister
- Julie Otsuka (born 1962), Japanese American author
- Ken Otsuka (大塚 健; born 1970), Japanese animator storyboarded Japanese anime My Hero Academia
- Kohei Otsuka (大塚 耕平, 1959–2026), Japanese politician
- Michael Otsuka (born 1964), American political philosopher
- Miyako Ōtsuka (大塚 宮子, born 1953), Japanese basketball player
- Miyu Otsuka (大塚 美優, born 1994), Japanese swimmer
- Motoyuki "Morrie" Ōtsuka (大塚 基之, born 1964), Japanese singer-songwriter
- Noyuri Otsuka (1924–2019), Japanese Christian scholar and researcher
- Tadashi Ohtsuka (大束 忠司, born 1978), Japanese badminton player
- Tarō Ōtsuka (大塚 太郎, 1868–?), Japanese garden designer: see T. R. Otsuka
- T. R. Otsuka (1868–?), Japanese garden designer
- Tatsunori Otsuka (大塚 達宣; born 2000), Japanese volleyball player
- Takeo Otsuka (大塚 武生, born 1966), Japanese professional wrestler also known as Men's Teioh or Terry Boy
- Takeru Otsuka (大塚 健; born 2001), Japanese snowboarder
- Yasuo Ōtsuka (大塚 康生, born 1931), animator
- Yuto Otsuka (大塚 裕土, born 1987), Japanese basketball player
- Sae Ōtsuka (大塚 紗英, born 1995), Japanese voice actor, singer
