= Ōtsuka (disambiguation) =

Ōtsuka is a Japanese surname.

Ōtsuka or Otsuka may also refer to:

- Ōtsuka Station, the name of multiple railway stations in Japan
- Otsuka FC, former name of Japanese professional football team Tokushima Vortis
- Otsuka Pharmaceutical, a Japan-based multi-national pharmaceutical company
