= Laura Bradley Park =

Park in Peoria, Illinois, United States

Coordinates: 40°42′13″N 89°37′23″W

- Bradley Park
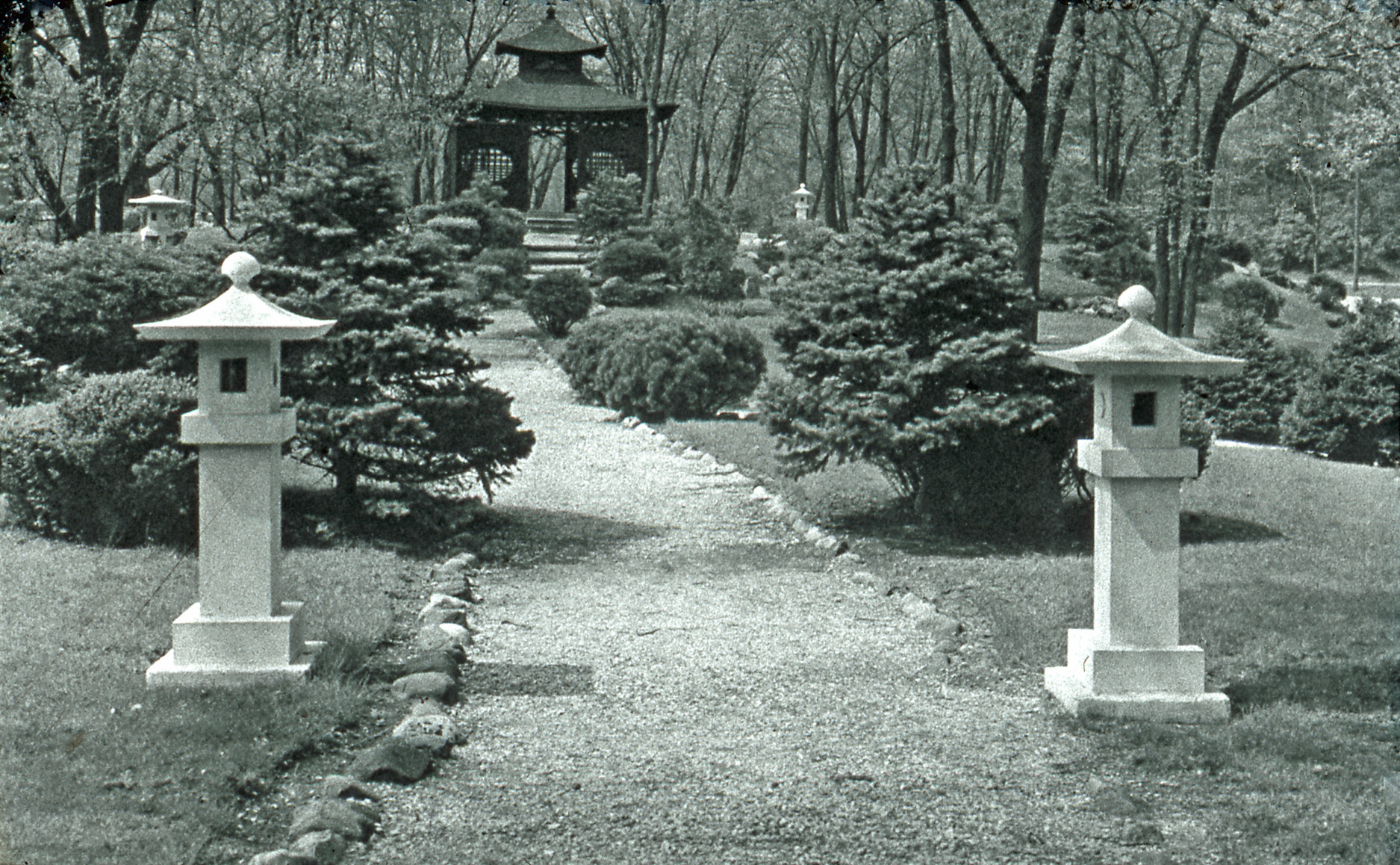
- Japanese Garden area in Laura Bradley Park, Peoria, Illinois, around 1920
- Interactive map of Laura Bradley Park
- Nearest city: Peoria, Illinois
- Area: 100 acres (40 ha)

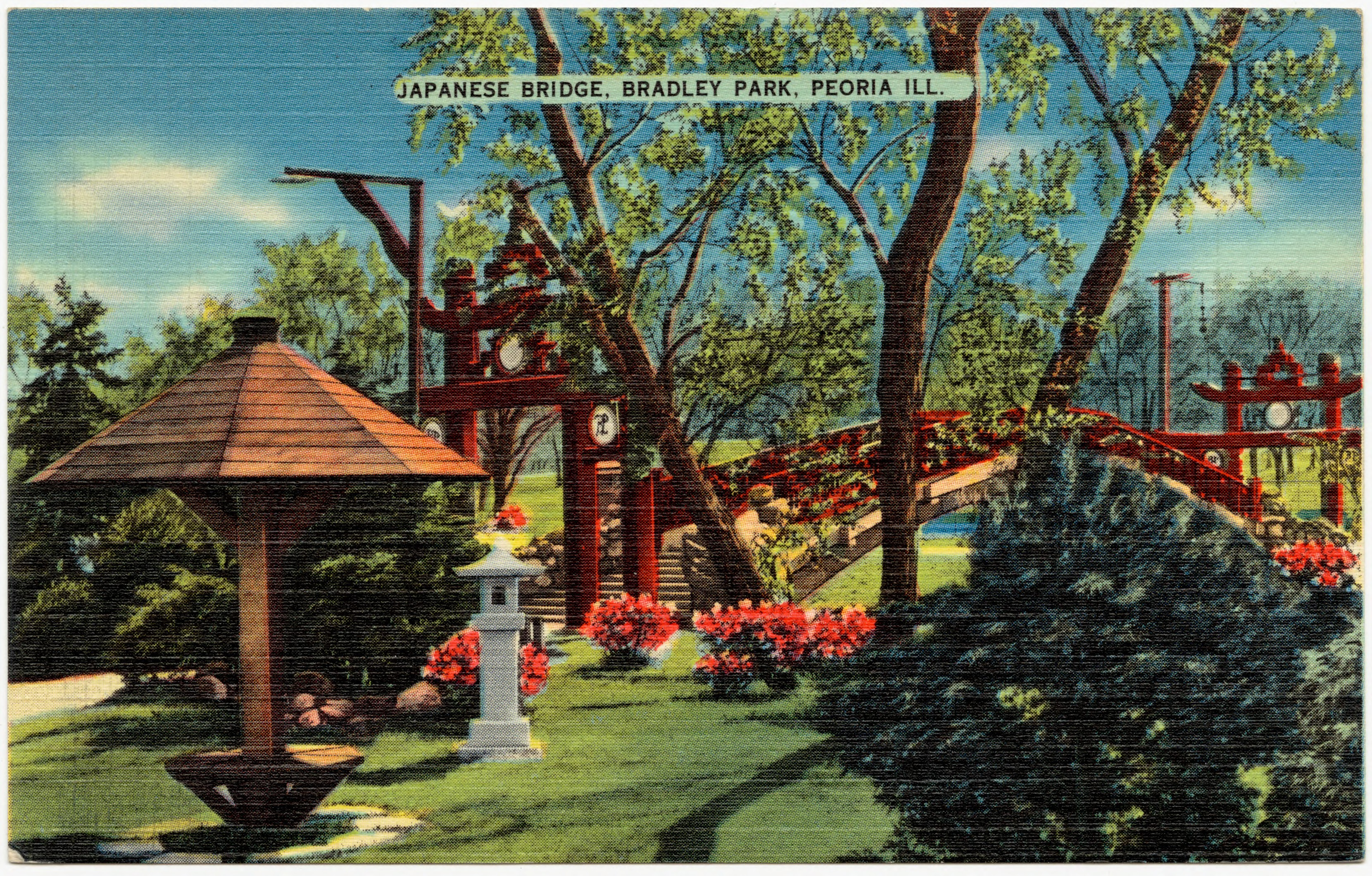
The Japanese bridge on a postcard from the 1930s/40s

Laura Bradley Park, also known as Bradley Park, is a park in Peoria, Illinois, United States. It historically contained a wading pool for children and flower gardens. As of 2022, it offers sports facilities, picnic sites, hiking opportunities on paved tracks, and a Japanese bridge.

The 100-acre (40 ha) park was given to the city of Peoria by Lydia Moss Bradley (1816-1908) in memory of her daughter Laura Bradley, who died in 1864 at the age of 14.

== Japanese Garden ==
A Japanese garden area was constructed by Peoria parks workers under the direction of Chicago Japanese garden builder T.R. Otsuka in Spring 1918, according to that year’s report of the park district board of trustees: “After the general plan had been adopted by the board, Mr. T.R. Otsuka, a Japanese landscape artist, from Chicago, was engaged to supervise the laying out of the walks, placing of stones, and general planning. A Japanese temple, or tea house, was constructed on the highest elevation.”

In 2021, a wooden pedestrian bridge from the 1930s that spans Dry Run Creek was replaced with a concrete bridge for $1.3 million dollars. The Japanese bridge also underwent renovations for $30,000. The Peoria Park District reopened both bridges in April 2022.

In 2020, the park district board voted to remove a controversial Christopher Columbus statue. A statue of the Greek goddess Hebe had been erected at the Main Street entrance until it was damaged by a car in 1954.
