= List of My Hero Academia episodes =

Key visual for the series

My Hero Academia is an anime television series based on the manga series My Hero Academia by Kōhei Horikoshi. An anime series adaptation was announced in Weekly Shōnen Jump in October 2015 and produced by Bones. The series is directed by Kenji Nagasaki, written by Yōsuke Kuroda, featuring character designs by Yoshihiko Umakoshi who also serves as the chief animation director, and music composed by Yuki Hayashi. The story follows Izuku Midoriya, a boy born without superpowers in a world where they are the norm, but who still dreams of becoming a superhero himself, and is scouted by the world's greatest hero, All Might, who shares his powers with Izuku after recognizing his value and enrolls him in a prestigious high school for superheroes in training.

The first season aired from April 3 to June 26, 2016, on all JNN affiliate stations, including TBS Television and Mainichi Broadcasting System. The second season aired from April 1 to September 30, 2017, on all NNS affiliate stations going forward, including Yomiuri TV and Nippon TV, with the staff and cast from the first season returning to reprise their roles. The third season aired from April 7 to September 29, 2018. The fourth season aired from October 12, 2019, to April 4, 2020. The fifth season aired from March 27 to September 25, 2021. The sixth season aired from October 1, 2022, to March 25, 2023. The seventh season aired from May 4 to October 12, 2024, with 4 "Memories" recap specials having aired in the preceding month of April. The eighth and final season aired from October 4 to December 13, 2025. A bonus television special that adapts chapter 431, which was bundled with the 42nd and final volume of the manga, premiered on May 2, 2026. The series featured a total of twenty-eight different theme songs across all eight seasons: fourteen opening themes and fourteen ending themes.

The series is licensed in North America, United Kingdom and Ireland by Crunchyroll (formerly Funimation), and is streamed on Crunchyroll, Hulu and Netflix. Universal Pictures, Sony Pictures and Manga Entertainment distributes the series in the United Kingdom and Ireland. Universal, Sony Pictures Home Entertainment and Madman Anime are simulcasting the series in Australia and New Zealand. Medialink licensed the series in Southeast Asia. They aired it simultaneously on Animax Asia. In April 2018, it was announced that the series's English dub would air in the United States on Adult Swim's Toonami programming block starting on May 5, 2018. In August 2023, Cartoon Network announced that the series would air in India starting on September 10, 2023; it was also set to air on the same television network in Japan. The first two seasons of the series's English dub once again aired in the United States on AXS TV from February 20 to October 3, 2025, as part of Web3 company Azuki's short-lived Anime.com Hour programming block.

== Series overview ==
Season	Episodes	Originally released	
Season	Episodes	First released	Last released
1	13	April 3, 2016	June 26, 2016
2	25	April 1, 2017	September 30, 2017
3	25	April 7, 2018	September 29, 2018
4	25	October 12, 2019	April 4, 2020
5	25	March 27, 2021	September 25, 2021
6	25	October 1, 2022	March 25, 2023
7	21	May 4, 2024	October 12, 2024
8	11	October 4, 2025	December 13, 2025
Bonus special		May 2, 2026	

== Episodes ==
=== Season 1 (2016) ===
No. overall	No. in season	Title	Directed by (Note: Information is taken from the ending credits of each episode.)	Storyboarded by	Original release date	English air date
1	1	"Izuku Midoriya: Origin"; Transliteration: "Midoriya Izuku: Orijin" (Japanese: 緑谷出久：オリジン)	Takurō Tsukada	Kenji Nagasaki	April 3, 2016	May 5, 2018
2	2	"What It Takes to Be a Hero"; Transliteration: "Hīrō no Jōken" (Japanese: ヒーローの条件)	Daisuke Tsukushi	Kenji Nagasaki	April 10, 2016	May 12, 2018
3	3	"Roaring Muscles"; Transliteration: "Unare kin'niku" (Japanese: うなれ筋肉)	Yoshifumi Sasahara	Katsumi Terahigashi	April 17, 2016	May 19, 2018
4	4	"Start Line"; Transliteration: "Sutaato Rain" (Japanese: スタートライン)	Masato Miyoshi	Tōru Yoshida	April 24, 2016	June 2, 2018 (Note: Episode 4 was delayed due to Adult Swim airing a FLCL marathon on May 26, 2018.)
5	5	"What I Can Do For Now"; Transliteration: "Ima Boku ni Dekiru Koto wo" (Japanese: 今 僕に出来ることを)	Satoshi Nakagawa	Katsuyuki Kodera	May 1, 2016	June 9, 2018
6	6	"Rage, You Damn Nerd"; Transliteration: "Takere Kusonādo" (Japanese: 猛れクソナード)	Takurō Tsukada	Kō Matsuo	May 8, 2016	June 16, 2018
7	7	"Deku vs. Kacchan"; Transliteration: "Deku bāsasu Kacchan" (Japanese: デクvsかっちゃん)	Geisei Morita	Takayuki Tanaka	May 15, 2016	June 23, 2018
8	8	"Bakugo's Start Line"; Transliteration: "Sutāto Rain, Bakugō no." (Japanese: スタートライン、爆豪の。)	Yoshifumi Sasahara	Satomi Nakamura	May 22, 2016	June 30, 2018
9	9	"Yeah, Just Do Your Best, Ida!"; Transliteration: "Ii zo Ganbare Īda-kun!" (Japanese: いいぞガンバレ飯田くん！)	Masashi Abe	Katsuyuki Kodera	May 29, 2016	July 7, 2018
10	10	"Encounter with the Unknown"; Transliteration: "Michi to no Sōgū" (Japanese: 未知との遭遇)	Takurō Tsukada	Shinji Ishihira	June 5, 2016	July 14, 2018
11	11	"Game Over"; Transliteration: "Gēmu Ōbā" (Japanese: ゲームオーバー)	Takahiro Natori	Takahiro Natori	June 12, 2016	July 21, 2018
12	12	"All Might"; Transliteration: "Ōru Maito" (Japanese: オールマイト)	Tsuyoshi Tobita, Hakuyu Go	Tōru Yoshida, Hakuyu Go	June 19, 2016	July 28, 2018
13	13	"In Each of Our Hearts"; Transliteration: "Onoono no Mune ni" (Japanese: 各々の胸に)	Tomo Ōkubo	Katsuyuki Kodera	June 26, 2016	August 4, 2018

=== Season 2 (2017) ===
No. overall	No. in season	Title	Directed by	Storyboarded by	Original release date	English air date	Viewership rating
14	1	"That's the Idea, Ochaco"; Transliteration: "Sou iu Koto ne Ochako-san" (Japanese: そういうことね お茶子さん)	Tetsuya Miyanishi (Note: Credited under the pen name "Setsumu Dōkawa" (堂川 セツム, Dōkawa Setsumu).)	Kenji Nagasaki	April 1, 2017	August 11, 2018	3.4%
15	2	"Roaring Sports Festival"; Transliteration: "Unare Taiikusai" (Japanese: うなれ体育祭)	Tomo Ōkubo	Kō Matsuo	April 8, 2017	August 18, 2018	3.5%
16	3	"In Their Own Quirky Ways"; Transliteration: "Minna Koseiteki de ii ne" (Japanese: みんな個性的でいいね)	Hitomi Ezoe	Shinji Ishihira	April 15, 2017	August 25, 2018	3.9%
17	4	"Strategy, Strategy, Strategy"; Transliteration: "Saku Saku Saku" (Japanese: 策策策)	Takudai Kakuchi	Kō Matsuo	April 22, 2017	September 8, 2018 (Note: Episode 17 was delayed due to Adult Swim airing a marathon of the first season of My Hero Academia on September 1, 2018.)	N/A
18	5	"Cavalry Battle Finale"; Transliteration: "Kibasen Kecchaku" (Japanese: 騎馬戦決着)	Tetsuya Miyanishi	Ken Ōtsuka	April 29, 2017	September 15, 2018	N/A
19	6	"The Boy Born with Everything"; Transliteration: "Subete o Motte Umareta Otokonoko" (Japanese: 全てを持って生まれた男の子)	Yōhei Fukui	Seiji Mizushima	May 6, 2017	September 22, 2018	3.5%
20	7	"Victory or Defeat"; Transliteration: "Kachimake" (Japanese: 勝ち負け)	Tomo Ōkubo	Tomo Ōkubo	May 13, 2017	September 29, 2018	3.4%
21	8	"Battle on, Challengers!"; Transliteration: "Furue! Charenjā" (Japanese: 奮え！チャレンジャー)	Satoshi Takafuji	Kō Matsuo	May 20, 2017	October 6, 2018	3.0%
22	9	"Bakugo vs. Uraraka"; Transliteration: "Bakugō bāsasu Uraraka" (Japanese: 爆豪vs麗日)	Hitomi Ezoe	Shinji Ishihira	May 27, 2017	October 13, 2018	N/A
23	10	"Shoto Todoroki: Origin"; Transliteration: "Todoroki Shōto: Orijin" (Japanese: 轟 焦凍:オリジン)	Tetsuya Miyanishi	Shinji Satō	June 3, 2017	October 20, 2018	3.0%
24	11	"Fight on, Ida"; Transliteration: "Īda-kun Faito" (Japanese: 飯田くんファイト)	Tōru Yoshida	Ken Ōtsuka	June 10, 2017	October 27, 2018	N/A
25	12	"Todoroki vs. Bakugo"; Transliteration: "Todoroki bāsasu Bakugō" (Japanese: 轟vs爆豪)	Satoshi Takafuji	Ken Ōtsuka	June 17, 2017	November 3, 2018	N/A
26	13	"Time to Pick Some Names"; Transliteration: "Namae o Tsuke te Miyō no Kai" (Japanese: 名前をつけてみようの会)	Takudai Kakuchi	Satomi Nakamura	June 24, 2017	November 10, 2018	N/A
27	14	"Bizarre! Gran Torino Appears"; Transliteration: "Kaiki! Guran Torino Arawaru" (Japanese: 怪奇!グラントリノ現る)	Yūji Ōya	Kō Matsuo	July 8, 2017	November 24, 2018 (Note: Episode 27 was delayed due to Adult Swim airing an Attack on Titan marathon on November 17, 2018.)	N/A
28	15	"Midoriya and Shigaraki"; Transliteration: "Midoriya to Shigaraki" (Japanese: 緑谷と死柄木)	Tomo Ōkubo	Tomo Ōkubo	July 15, 2017	December 1, 2018	3.0%
29	16	"Hero Killer: Stain vs U.A. Students"; Transliteration: "Hīrō Goroshi Sutein bāsasu U.A. Seito" (Japanese: ヒーロー殺し ステインvs雄英生徒)	Hitomi Ezoe, Sayaka Ikeda	Michio Fukuda	July 22, 2017	December 8, 2018	2.8%
30	17	"Climax"; Transliteration: "Ketchaku" (Japanese: 決着)	Satoshi Takafuji	Ken Ōtsuka	July 29, 2017	December 15, 2018	4.5%
31	18	"The Aftermath of Hero Killer: Stain"; Transliteration: "'Hīrō Goroshi Sutein' Sono Yoha" (Japanese: 「ヒーロー殺しステイン」その余波)	Takudai Kakuchi	Seiji Mizushima	August 5, 2017	January 6, 2019 (Note: Episode 31 was delayed due to Adult Swim airing a Dragon Ball Super marathon on December 22, 2018, and a Boruto: Naruto Next Generations marathon on December 29, 2018, respectively. When normal programming resumed, Adult Swim moved My Hero Academia to 12:00 a.m. EST/PST on the night of January 5, 2019, which is January 6.)	N/A
32	19	"Everyone's Internships"; Transliteration: "Sorezore no Shokuba Taiken" (Japanese: それぞれの職場体験)	Ikurō Satō	Shinji Satō	August 12, 2017	January 13, 2019	2.7%
33	20	"Listen Up!! A Tale from the Past"; Transliteration: "Shire!! Mukashi no Hanashi" (Japanese: 知れ!!昔の話)	Takayuki Yamamoto	Kō Matsuo	August 19, 2017	January 20, 2019	4.1%
34	21	"Gear up for Final Exams"; Transliteration: "Sonaero Kimatsu Tesuto" (Japanese: 備えろ期末テスト)	Tomo Ōkubo	Shinji Ishihira	September 2, 2017	January 27, 2019	3.2%
35	22	"Yaoyorozu: Rising"; Transliteration: "Yaoyorozu: Raijingu" (Japanese: 八百万：ライジング)	Takudai Kakuchi	Michio Fukuda	September 9, 2017	February 3, 2019	3.0%
36	23	"Stripping the Varnish"; Transliteration: "Mukero Hitokawa" (Japanese: むけろ一皮)	Satoshi Takafuji	Ken Ōtsuka	September 16, 2017	February 10, 2019	3.9%
37	24	"Katsuki Bakugo: Origin"; Transliteration: "Bakugō Katsuki: Orijin" (Japanese: 爆豪勝己：オリジン)	Tomo Ōkubo	Shinji Satō	September 23, 2017	February 17, 2019	3.4%
38	25	"Encounter"; Transliteration: "Enkauntā" (Japanese: エンカウンター)	Takudai Kakuchi	Kō Matsuo	September 30, 2017	February 24, 2019	3.9%

=== Season 3 (2018) ===
No. overall	No. in season	Title	Directed by	Storyboarded by	Original release date	English air date	Viewership rating
39	1	"Game Start"; Transliteration: "Gēmu Sutāto" (Japanese: ゲーム・スタート)	Takudai Kakuchi	Takudai Kakuchi	April 7, 2018	March 3, 2019	4.9%
40	2	"Wild, Wild Pussycats"; Transliteration: "Wairudo Wairudo Pusshīkyattsu" (Japanese: ワイルド・ワイルド・プッシーキャッツ)	Tomo Ōkubo	Shinji Satō	April 14, 2018	March 10, 2019	2.9%
41	3	"Kota"; Transliteration: "Kōta-kun" (Japanese: 洸汰くん)	Tetsuya Miyanishi (Note: Credited under the pen name "Setsumu Dōkawa" (堂川 セツム, Dōkawa Setsumu).)	Satoshi Matsumoto (Note: Unknown storyboard artist; believed to be a pen name of Rie Matsumoto.)	April 21, 2018	March 17, 2019	3.6%
42	4	"My Hero"; Transliteration: "Boku no Hīrō" (Japanese: 僕のヒーロー)	Shōji Ikeno	Michio Fukuda	April 28, 2018	March 24, 2019	3.7%
43	5	"Drive It Home, Iron Fist!!!"; Transliteration: "Buchikomu Tekken!!!" (Japanese: ブチ込む鉄拳!!!)	Naoki Hishikawa	Ken Ōtsuka	May 5, 2018	March 31, 2019	3.4%
44	6	"Roaring Upheaval"; Transliteration: "Ganaru Fūunkyū" (Japanese: がなる風雲急)	Shōji Ikeno	Shinji Satō	May 12, 2018	April 7, 2019	N/A
45	7	"What a Twist!"; Transliteration: "Ten Ten Ten!" (Japanese: 転転転!)	Tomo Ōkubo	Tomo Ōkubo	May 19, 2018	April 13, 2019 (Note: Adult Swim moved My Hero Academia back a half-hour (to 11:30 p.m. EDT/PDT).)	3.2%
46	8	"From Iida to Midoriya"; Transliteration: "Īda-kara Midoriya e" (Japanese: 飯田から緑谷へ)	Tetsuya Miyanishi (Note: Tomo Ōkubo was erroneously credited instead in the TV broadcast.)	Shinji Ishihira (Note: Shinji Satō was erroneously credited instead in the TV broadcast.)	May 26, 2018	April 20, 2019	3.7%
47	9	"All For One"; Transliteration: "Ōru Fō Wan" (Japanese: オール・フォー・ワン)	Yūsuke Kamata	Ken Ōtsuka	June 2, 2018	April 27, 2019	4.2%
48	10	"Symbol of Peace"; Transliteration: "Heiwa no Shōchō" (Japanese: 平和の象徴)	Yūji Ōya	Shinji Ishihira	June 9, 2018	May 4, 2019	3.6%
49	11	"One For All"; Transliteration: "Wan Fō Ōru" (Japanese: ワン・フォー・オール)	Tetsuya Miyanishi	Shinji Ishihira	June 16, 2018	May 11, 2019	4.5%
50	12	"End of the Beginning, Beginning of the End"; Transliteration: "Hajimari no Owari Owari no Hajimari" (Japanese: 始まりの終わり 終わりの始まり)	Shōji Ikeno	Satomi Nakamura	June 23, 2018	May 18, 2019	2.8%
51	13	"Moving into Dorms"; Transliteration: "Haire Ryō" (Japanese: 入れ寮)	Tetsuya Miyanishi	Takashi Kawabata	June 30, 2018	May 25, 2019	3.5%
52	14	"Create Those Ultimate Moves"; Transliteration: "Ame Hissatsuwaza" (Japanese: 編め必殺技)	Satoshi Takafuji	Shinji Ishihira	July 14, 2018	June 1, 2019	N/A
53	15	"The Test"; Transliteration: "Za Shiken" (Japanese: THE試験)	Masahiro Mukai	Kō Matsuo	July 21, 2018	June 8, 2019	3.2%
54	16	"Shiketsu High Lurking"; Transliteration: "Haiyoru Shiketsu Kōkō" (Japanese: 這い寄る士傑高校)	Tetsuya Miyanishi	Motonobu Hori	July 28, 2018	June 15, 2019	4.5%
55	17	"Class 1-A"; Transliteration: "Ichi-Nen Ei-Gumi" (Japanese: 1年A組)	Takahiro Hasui	Shinji Ishihira	August 4, 2018	June 22, 2019	3.2%
56	18	"Rush!"	Shōji Ikeno	Atsushi Takahashi	August 11, 2018	June 29, 2019	3.7%
57	19	"Rescue Exercises"; Transliteration: "Kyūjo Enshū" (Japanese: 救助演習)	Masahiro Mukai	Shinji Ishihira	August 18, 2018	July 7, 2019 (Note: Adult Swim moved My Hero Academia to 3:30 a.m. EDT/PDT beginning on the night of July 6, 2019, which is July 7.)	N/A
58	20	"Special Episode: Save the World with Love!"; Transliteration: "Tokubetsu-hen・Ai de Chikyū o Sukue!" (Japanese: 特別編・愛で地球を救え!)	Tetsuya Miyanishi	Shinji Satō	August 25, 2018	July 14, 2019	4.8%
59	21	"What's the Big Idea?"; Transliteration: "Nani o Shitendayo" (Japanese: 何をしてんだよ)	Ikurō Satō	Shinji Satō	September 1, 2018	July 21, 2019	3.1%
60	22	"A Talk about Your Quirk"; Transliteration: "Temee no "Kosei" no Hanashida" (Japanese: てめェの"個性"の話だ)	Tomo Ōkubo	Shinji Ishihira	September 8, 2018	July 28, 2019	3.3%
61	23	"Deku vs. Kacchan, Part 2"; Transliteration: "Deku bāsasu Kacchan 2" (Japanese: デクvsかっちゃん2)	Masashi Abe, Shōji Ikeno	Shinji Satō	September 15, 2018	August 4, 2019	N/A
62	24	"A Season for Encounters"; Transliteration: "Deai no Kisetsu" (Japanese: 出会いの季節)	Tomo Ōkubo	Shinji Ishihira	September 22, 2018	August 11, 2019	3.5%
63	25	"Unrivaled"; Transliteration: "Muteki" (Japanese: 無敵)	Kenji Nagasaki	Kenji Nagasaki	September 29, 2018	August 18, 2019	5.1%

=== Season 4 (2019–20) ===
No. overall	No. in season	Title	Directed by	Storyboarded by	Original release date	English air date	Viewership rating
64	1	"The Scoop on U.A. Class 1-A"; Transliteration: "Sukūpu U.A. Ichi-Nen Ei-Gumi" (Japanese: スクープ雄英1年A組)	Naomi Nakayama	Masahiro Mukai	October 12, 2019 (Note: Due to emergency reporting of Typhoon Hagibis, broadcast of episode 64 was suspended in certain regions of Japan, and international simulcasts were delayed.)	November 9, 2019	N/A
65	2	"Overhaul"; Transliteration: "Ōbāhōru" (Japanese: オーバーホール)	Tomo Ōkubo	Masahiro Mukai	October 19, 2019	November 16, 2019	4.5%
66	3	"Boy Meets…"; Transliteration: "Bōi Mītsu" (Japanese: ボーイ・ミーツ…)	Masashi Abe	Takashi Kawabata	October 26, 2019	November 23, 2019	4.0%
67	4	"Fighting Fate"; Transliteration: "Aragau Unmei" (Japanese: 抗う運命)	Shōji Ikeno	Kō Matsuo	November 9, 2019 (Note: Due to the 2019 Rugby World Cup Finals on November 2, 2019, broadcast of episode 67 was postponed to the following week.)	November 30, 2019	4.6%
68	5	"Let's Go, Gutsy Red Riot"; Transliteration: "Gattsuda Rettsura Reddo Raiotto" (Japanese: ガッツだレッツラレッドライオット)	Tetsuya Miyanishi (Note: Credited under the pen name "Setsumu Dōkawa" (堂川 セツム, Dōkawa Setsumu).)	Shinji Ishihira	November 16, 2019	December 7, 2019	3.2%
69	6	"An Unpleasant Talk"; Transliteration: "Iyana Hanashi" (Japanese: 嫌な話)	Tomo Ōkubo	Tomo Ōkubo	November 23, 2019	December 14, 2019	4.1%
70	7	"Go!!"	Miwa Sasaki	Miwa Sasaki	November 30, 2019	January 4, 2020	4.8%
71	8	"Suneater of the Big Three"; Transliteration: "Biggu 3 no San'ītā" (Japanese: ビッグ3のサンイーター)	Masashi Abe	Shinji Satō	December 7, 2019	January 11, 2020	4.8%
72	9	"Red Riot"; Transliteration: "Reddo Raiotto" (Japanese: 烈怒頼雄斗(レッドライオット))	Shōji Ikeno	Shinji Ishihira	December 14, 2019	January 18, 2020	3.7%
73	10	"Temp Squad"; Transliteration: "Shukkō" (Japanese: 出向)	Tomo Ōkubo	Tomo Ōkubo	December 21, 2019	January 25, 2020	3.8%
74	11	"Lemillion"; Transliteration: "Rumirion" (Japanese: ルミリオン)	Tetsuya Miyanishi	Tetsuya Miyanishi	December 28, 2019	February 1, 2020	4.1%
75	12	"Unforeseen Hope"; Transliteration: "Mienai Kibō" (Japanese: 見えない希望)	Shōji Ikeno	Kō Matsuo	January 4, 2020	February 8, 2020	3.3%
76	13	"Infinite 100%"; Transliteration: "Mugen Hyaku-pāsento" (Japanese: 無限100%)	Masashi Abe, Tetsuya Miyanishi	Takashi Kawabata, Masahiro Mukai	January 11, 2020	February 15, 2020	4.3%
77	14	"Bright Future"; Transliteration: "Akarui Mirai" (Japanese: 明るい未来)	Miwa Sasaki	Miwa Sasaki	January 18, 2020	February 29, 2020 (Note: Episode 77 was delayed on Adult Swim on the night of February 22, 2020, due to a Toonami schedule redaction and the airing of Dr. Stone's finale.)	3.4%
78	15	"Smoldering Flames"; Transliteration: "Kusuburu Honō" (Japanese: 燻る炎)	Shōji Ikeno	Naomi Nakayama	January 25, 2020	March 7, 2020	4.3%
79	16	"Win Those Kids' Hearts"; Transliteration: "Tsukame Gaki Kokoro" (Japanese: 掴めガキ心)	Hidekazu Hara	Hidekazu Hara	February 1, 2020	March 14, 2020	5.2%
80	17	"Relief for License Trainees"; Transliteration: "Hokkore Karimen Kōshū" (Japanese: ホッコれ仮免講習)	Masashi Abe	Takashi Kawabata	February 8, 2020	March 21, 2020	4.3%
81	18	"School Festival"; Transliteration: "Bunkasai" (Japanese: 文化祭)	Tetsuya Miyanishi	Shinji Ishihira	February 15, 2020	March 28, 2020	4.5%
82	19	"Prepping for the School Festival Is the Funnest Part"; Transliteration: "Bunkasai-tte Junbi-shiteru Toki ga Ichiban Tanoshii yo ne" (Japanese: 文化祭って準備してる時が一番楽しいよね)	Shōji Ikeno	Kō Matsuo	February 22, 2020	April 4, 2020	4.3%
83	20	"Gold Tips Imperial"; Transliteration: "Gōrudo Tippusu Inperiaru" (Japanese: ゴールドティップスインペリアル)	Masashi Abe	Naomi Nakayama	February 29, 2020	April 19, 2020 (Note: Adult Swim moved My Hero Academia from 11:30 p.m. to 12:00 a.m. EDT/PDT, making the air dates from episodes 83 onward effectively Sunday.)	4.4%
84	21	"Deku vs. Gentle Criminal"; Transliteration: "Deku bāsasu Jentoru Kuriminaru" (Japanese: デクVSジェントル・クリミナル)	Shōji Ikeno	Shinji Ishihira	March 7, 2020	April 26, 2020 (Note: Due to the COVID-19 pandemic, Funimation began adding a disclaimer at the beginning of episodes stating that the English dub voice actors were able to record their lines from the safety of their homes.)	4.6%
85	22	"School Festival Start!!"; Transliteration: "Kaisai Bunkasai!!" (Japanese: 開催文化祭!!)	Miwa Sasaki	Miwa Sasaki	March 14, 2020	May 3, 2020	4.1%
86	23	"Let It Flow! School Festival!"; Transliteration: "Tare Nagase! Bunkasai!" (Japanese: 垂れ流せ！文化祭！)	Shōji Ikeno	Shinji Satō	March 21, 2020	May 17, 2020 (Note: Episode 86 was delayed from airing on Adult Swim on the night of May 9/10, 2020, due to production complications for Funimation's English dub caused by the COVID-19 pandemic. Episode 85 reran in its place.)	3.8%
87	24	"Japanese Hero Billboard Chart"; Transliteration: "Hīrō Birubōdo Chāto Jeipī (Note: Hero Billboard Chart JP)" (Japanese: ヒーロービルボードチャートJP)	Masashi Abe	Naomi Nakayama	March 28, 2020	June 21, 2020 (Note: Episode 87 was delayed from airing on Adult Swim for four weeks due to production complications for Funimation's English dub caused by the COVID-19 pandemic. Episodes 84–86 reran for first three weeks and a fan favorite episode ran on the fourth week.)	6.0%
88	25	"His Start"; Transliteration: "Hajimarino" (Japanese: 始まりの)	Tetsuya Miyanishi	Tetsuya Miyanishi	April 4, 2020	June 28, 2020	5.6%

=== Season 5 (2021) ===
No. overall	No. in season	Title (Note: English translated titles are taken from Crunchyroll.)	Directed by	Storyboarded by	Original release date	English air date (Note: Adult Swim lists the season as premiering on May 8, 2021, at 12:30 a.m. (24:30) EDT/PDT, which is effectively May 9.)	Viewership rating
89	1	"All Hands on Deck! Class 1-A"; Transliteration: "Zen'in Shutsudō! Ichi-nen Ē-gumi" (Japanese: 全員出動！1年A組)	Tsuyoshi Tobita	Masahiro Mukai	March 27, 2021	May 9, 2021	3.2%
90	2	"Vestiges"; Transliteration: "Omokage" (Japanese: 面影)	Shōji Ikeno	Kō Matsuo	April 3, 2021	May 16, 2021	3.4%
91	3	"Clash! Class A vs. Class B!"; Transliteration: "Gekitotsu! Ē-gumi bāsasu Bī-gumi" (Japanese: 激突！A組 VS B組)	Ikurō Satō	Shinji Ishihira	April 10, 2021	May 23, 2021	3.8%
92	4	"Make It Happen, Shinso!"; Transliteration: "Soreike Shinsō-kun!" (Japanese: それ行け心操くん！)	Tomo Ōkubo	Tomo Ōkubo	April 17, 2021	May 30, 2021	4.2%
93	5	"Operation New Improv Moves"; Transliteration: "Shin Waza Sokkyō Operēshon" (Japanese: 新技即興オペレーション)	Tsuyoshi Tobita	Shinji Satō	April 24, 2021	June 6, 2021	3.6%
94	6	"Foresight"; Transliteration: "Saki o Misuete" (Japanese: 先を見据えて)	Shōji Ikeno	Shōji Ikeno	May 1, 2021	June 13, 2021	4.0%
95	7	"Match 3"; Transliteration: "Dai San Shiai" (Japanese: 第3試合)	Ikurō Satō	Shinji Ishihira	May 8, 2021	June 20, 2021	4.2%
96	8	"Match 3 Conclusion"; Transliteration: "Dai San Shiai Ketchaku" (Japanese: 第3試合決着)	Tomo Ōkubo	Tomo Ōkubo	May 15, 2021	June 27, 2021	3.6%
97	9	"Early Bird!"; Transliteration: "Sente Hisshō!" (Japanese: 先手必勝！)	Tsuyoshi Tobita	Shinji Satō	May 22, 2021	July 4, 2021	4.0%
98	10	"That Which Is Inherited"; Transliteration: "Uketsugu Mono" (Japanese: 受け継ぐモノ)	Shōji Ikeno	Shinji Satō	May 29, 2021	July 11, 2021	3.6%
99	11	"Our Brawl"; Transliteration: "Bokura no Dai Ransen" (Japanese: ぼくらの大乱戦)	Ikurō Satō	Takashi Kawabata	June 5, 2021	July 18, 2021	3.8%
100	12	"The New Power and All For One"; Transliteration: "Atarashii Chikara to Ōru・Fō・Wan" (Japanese: 新しい力とオール・フォー・ワン)	Tomo Ōkubo	Kō Matsuo (Note: Credited on the website but not in the episode.) & Tomo Ōkubo (Note: Credited in the episode but not on the website.)	June 12, 2021	July 25, 2021	3.9%
101	13	"Have a Merry Christmas!"; Transliteration: "Merire! Kurisumasu! (Note: Merry! Christmas!)" (Japanese: メリれ！クリスマス！)	Shōji Ikeno	Shōji Ikeno	June 19, 2021	August 1, 2021	3.6%
102	14	"Off to Endeavor's Agency!"; Transliteration: "Iza! Endevā Jimusho!" (Japanese: いざ！エンデヴァー事務所！)	Ikurō Satō	Takashi Kawabata	June 26, 2021	August 1, 2021	3.9%
103	15	"One Thing at a Time"; Transliteration: "Hitotsu Hitotsu" (Japanese: 一つ一つ)	Tsuyoshi Tobita	Tomo Ōkubo	July 10, 2021	August 15, 2021	3.5%
104	16	"Long Time No See, Selkie"; Transliteration: "Ohisashiburi Desu Serukī-san" (Japanese: お久しぶりですセルキーさん)	Ikurō Satō, Shōji Ikeno & Sayaka Morikawa	Shinji Ishihira	July 17, 2021	August 22, 2021	2.8%
105	17	"The Hellish Todoroki Family"; Transliteration: "Jigoku no Todoroki-kun Chi" (Japanese: 地獄の轟くん家)	Shōji Ikeno	Takashi Kawabata	July 24, 2021	August 29, 2021	3.3%
106	18	"The Unforgiven"; Transliteration: "Yurusarezaru Mono" (Japanese: 許されざる者)	Tsuyoshi Tobita	Shinji Satō	July 31, 2021	September 5, 2021	3.2%
107	19	"More of a Hero Than Anyone"; Transliteration: "Dare Yori mo Omae wa Hīrō ni" (Japanese: 誰よりもおまえはヒーローに)	Masashi Abe	Shinji Satō	August 14, 2021	September 12, 2021	4.4%
108	20	"My Villain Academia"; Transliteration: "Boku no Viran Akademia" (Japanese: 僕のヴィランアカデミア)	Ikurō Satō & Takanori Yano	Kō Matsuo	August 21, 2021	September 19, 2021	4.3%
109	21	"Revival Party"; Transliteration: "Sairin-sai" (Japanese: 再臨祭)	Masatoyo Takada	Takashi Kawabata	August 28, 2021	September 26, 2021	4.6%
110	22	"Sad Man's Parade"; Transliteration: "Saddo Manzu Parēdo" (Japanese: サッドマンズパレード)	Shōji Ikeno	Shōji Ikeno	September 4, 2021	October 3, 2021	4.5%
111	23	"Tenko Shimura: Origin"; Transliteration: "Shimura Tenko: Orijin" (Japanese: 志村転弧：オリジン)	Takayuki Yamamoto	Shinji Satō	September 11, 2021	October 10, 2021	3.7%
112	24	"Tomura Shigaraki: Origin"; Transliteration: "Shigaraki Tomura: Orijin" (Japanese: 死柄木弔：オリジン)	Ikurō Satō	Takashi Kawabata	September 18, 2021	November 7, 2021	3.8%
113	25	"The High, Deep Blue Sky"; Transliteration: "Sora, Takaku Gunjō" (Japanese: 空、高く群青)	Tsuyoshi Tobita	Kō Matsuo	September 25, 2021	November 7, 2021	3.9%

=== Season 6 (2022–23) ===
No. overall	No. in season	Title	Directed by	Storyboarded by	Original release date	English air date (Note: Adult Swim listed the season as premiering on December 3, 2022, at midnight (24:00) EST/PST, which is effectively December 4.)	Viewership rating
114	1	"A Quiet Beginning"; Transliteration: "Shizukana Hajimari" (Japanese: 静かな始まり)	Tomo Ōkubo	Tomo Ōkubo	October 1, 2022	December 4, 2022	3.9%
115	2	"Mirko, the No. 5 Hero"; Transliteration: "Nanbā Faibu no Miruko-san" (Japanese: No.5のミルコさん)	Shōji Ikeno	Shōji Ikeno	October 8, 2022	December 11, 2022	3.1%
116	3	"One's Justice"	Tsuyoshi Tobita	Takashi Kawabata	October 15, 2022	December 18, 2022	4.0%
117	4	"Inheritance"; Transliteration: "Keishō" (Japanese: 継承)	Kazuma Komatsu	Motonobu Hori	October 22, 2022	January 8, 2023	4.0%
118	5	"The Thrill of Destruction"; Transliteration: "Hametsu no Borutēji" (Japanese: 破滅のボルテージ)	Ikurō Satō	Michio Fukuda	October 29, 2022	January 15, 2023	4.4%
119	6	"Encounter, Part 2"; Transliteration: "Enkauntā Ni" (Japanese: エンカウンター2)	Tomo Ōkubo	Tomo Ōkubo	November 5, 2022	January 22, 2023	3.6%
120	7	"Disaster Walker"; Transliteration: "Dizasutā Wōkā" (Japanese: 災害歩行(ディザスターウォーカー))	Shōji Ikeno	Shōji Ikeno	November 12, 2022	January 29, 2023	3.4%
121	8	"League of Villains vs. U.A. Students"; Transliteration: "Viran Rengō bāsasu Yūei Sei" (Japanese: 敵(ヴィラン)連合vs雄英生)	Kazuma Komatsu	Kō Matsuo	November 19, 2022	February 5, 2023	3.4%
122	9	"Katsuki Bakugo: Rising"; Transliteration: "Bakugō Katsuki: Raijingu" (Japanese: 爆豪勝己：ライジング)	Tomohiro Kamitani	Tomohiro Kamitani	November 26, 2022	February 12, 2023	3.7%
123	10	"The Ones Within Us"; Transliteration: "Bokura no Naka no Hito" (Japanese: 僕らの中の人)	Tomo Ōkubo	Tomo Ōkubo	December 3, 2022	February 19, 2023	5.3%
124	11	"Dabi's Dance"; Transliteration: "Dabi Dansu" (Japanese: ダビダンス)	Shōji Ikeno	Shōji Ikeno	December 10, 2022	February 26, 2023	3.9%
125	12	"Threads of Hope"; Transliteration: "Ichiru no Kibō-tachi" (Japanese: 一縷の希望たち)	Ikurō Satō	Minoru Ōhara	December 17, 2022	March 5, 2023	3.7%
126	13	"Final Performance"; Transliteration: "Rasuto Sutēji (Note: Last Stage)" (Japanese: ラストステージ)	Tsuyoshi Tobita	Tomo Ōkubo	December 24, 2022	March 5, 2023	4.3%
127	14	"Hellish Hell"; Transliteration: "Gokukoku, Jigoku" (Japanese: 極々、地獄)	Shōji Ikeno	Takashi Kawabata	January 7, 2023	March 12, 2023	4.1%
128	15	"Tartarus"; Transliteration: "Tarutarosu" (Japanese: タルタロス)	Tomo Ōkubo	Tomo Ōkubo	January 14, 2023	March 12, 2023	3.2%
129	16	"The Hellish Todoroki Family, Part 2"; Transliteration: "Jigoku no Todoroki-kun-chi Ni" (Japanese: 地獄の轟くん家2)	Kazuma Komatsu	Takashi Kawabata	January 21, 2023	March 19, 2023	3.3%
130	17	"The Wrong Way to Put Out a Fire"; Transliteration: "Hi no Fushimatsu" (Japanese: 火の不始末)	Shōji Ikeno	Shōji Ikeno	January 28, 2023	March 19, 2023	4.0%
131	18	"Izuku Midoriya and Tomura Shigaraki"; Transliteration: "Midoriya Izuku to Shigaraki Tomura" (Japanese: 緑谷出久と死柄木弔)	Ikurō Satō	Shōji Ikeno	February 4, 2023	March 26, 2023	3.6%
132	19	"Full Power!!"; Transliteration: "Zenryoku!!" (Japanese: 全力!!)	Shōji Ikeno	Tomohiro Kamitani	February 11, 2023	March 26, 2023	3.8%
133	20	"Hired Gun"; Transliteration: "Shikaku" (Japanese: 刺客)	Tsuyoshi Tobita	Shinji Satō	February 18, 2023	April 2, 2023	3.5%
134	21	"The Lovely Lady Nagant"; Transliteration: "Uruwashiki Redi・Nagan" (Japanese: 麗しきレディ・ナガン)	Tomo Ōkubo	Tomo Ōkubo	February 25, 2023	April 2, 2023	3.8%
135	22	"Friend"; Transliteration: "Tomodachi" (Japanese: 友だち)	Shōji Ikeno	Shōji Ikeno	March 4, 2023	April 9, 2023	3.1%
136	23	"Deku vs. Class A"; Transliteration: "Deku bāsasu Ē-gumi" (Japanese: デクvsA組)	Tomo Ōkubo	Shinji Satō	March 11, 2023	April 9, 2023	2.7%
137	24	"A Young Woman's Declaration"; Transliteration: "Miseinen no Shuchō" (Japanese: 未成年の主張)	Ikurō Satō	Kō Matsuo	March 18, 2023	April 16, 2023	3.3%
138	25	"No Man Is an Island"; Transliteration: "Tsunagaru Tsunagaru" (Japanese: つながるつながる)	Shōji Ikeno	Shinji Satō	March 25, 2023	April 23, 2023	3.0%

=== Season 7 (2024) ===
No. overall	No. in season	Title	Directed by	Storyboarded by	Original release date	Viewership rating
139	1	"In the Nick of Time! A Big-Time Maverick from the West!"; Transliteration: "Ōbei Girigiri!! Butchigiri no Sugoi Yatsu" (Japanese: 欧米ギリギリ!!ぶっちぎりの凄い奴)	Ikurō Satō	Naomi Nakayama	May 4, 2024	2.8%
140	2	"Specter"; Transliteration: "Bōrei" (Japanese: 亡霊)	Shōji Ikeno	Naomi Nakayama, Takahiro Komori & Tomo Ōkubo	May 11, 2024	3.2%
141	3	"Villain"; Transliteration: "Viran" (Japanese: 敵(ヴィラン))	Tomo Ōkubo	Tomo Ōkubo	May 18, 2024	2.5%
142	4	"The Story of How We All Became Heroes"; Transliteration: "Min'na ga Hīrō ni Naru Made no Monogatari" (Japanese: 皆がヒーローになるまでの物語)	Shōji Ikeno	Shōji Ikeno	May 25, 2024	2.6%
143	5	"Let You Down" (Note: Stylized in sentence case)	Tsuyoshi Tobita	Kazuhiro Yoneda	June 1, 2024	2.5%
144	6	"Division" (Note: Stylized in all caps)	Takafumi Hino	Akiko Ōtsuka	June 8, 2024	2.5%
145	7	"Inflation"	Tomo Ōkubo	Tomo Ōkubo	June 15, 2024	2.3%
146	8	"Two Flashfires"; Transliteration: "Futatsu no Kakushaku" (Japanese: 二つの赫灼)	Shōji Ikeno	Kō Matsuo	June 22, 2024	N/A
147	9	"Extras"	Michiru Itabisashi	Akiko Ōtsuka	June 29, 2024	N/A
148	10	"Wounded Hero, Burning Bright and True!!"; Transliteration: "Shōshin Shōmei!! Teoi no Hīrō" (Japanese: 焼身照命!! 手負いのヒーロー)	Tsuyoshi Tobita	Tomo Ōkubo	July 13, 2024	2.3%
149	11	"Light Fades to Rain" (Note: Stylized in start case)	Shōji Ikeno	Akiko Ōtsuka	July 20, 2024	3.2%
150	12	"Those Who Defend, Those Who Violate"; Transliteration: "Fusegu Mono to Okasu Mono" (Japanese: 禦ぐ者と侵す者)	Masayuki Otsuki	Naomi Nakayama	August 3, 2024	2.8%
151	13	"A Chain of Events, Across the Ages"; Transliteration: "Tsuranaru Seisō" (Japanese: 連なる星霜)	Tomo Ōkubo	Tomo Ōkubo	August 17, 2024	3.2%
152	14	"Together with Shoji"; Transliteration: "Shōji-kun to Issho." (Japanese: しょーじくんといっしょ。)	Shōji Ikeno	Shōji Ikeno	August 24, 2024	2.8%
153	15	"Butterfly Effect"	Tsuyoshi Tobita	Tomo Ōkubo	August 31, 2024	5.1%
154	16	"The Chain Thus Far"; Transliteration: "Koko ni Itaru Made no Tsuranari" (Japanese: ここに至るまでの連なり)	Hyūga Yamamura	Takafumi Hino & Hyūga Yamamura	September 7, 2024	3.1%
155	17	"Hopes" (Note: Stylized in all lowercase)	Tomo Ōkubo	Tomo Ōkubo	September 14, 2024	2.9%
156	18	"It's a Small World"	Shōji Ikeno	Shōji Ikeno	September 21, 2024	2.8%
157	19	"I Am Here"	Masayuki Otsuki	Motonobu Hori	September 28, 2024	3.8%
158	20	"A Girl's Ego"; Transliteration: "Shōjo no Ego" (Japanese: 少女のエゴ)	Tsuyoshi Tobita	Tensai Okamura	October 5, 2024	3.4%
159	21	"Battle Without a Quirk"; Transliteration: ""Kosei" Naki Tatakai" (Japanese: "個性"無き戦い)	Tomo Ōkubo	Tomo Ōkubo	October 12, 2024	3.2%

=== Season 8 (2025) ===
No. overall	No. in season	Title	Directed by	Storyboarded by	Original release date	Viewership rating
160	1	"Toshinori Yagi: Rising / Origin"; Transliteration: "Yagi Toshinori: Raijingu Orijin" (Japanese: 八木俊典：ライジングオリジン)	Masayuki Otsuki	Naomi Nakayama	October 4, 2025	3.9%
161	2	"The End of an Era, and the Beginning" (Note: Episode 161's title was originally promoted as "The End of an Era, and ―" until its broadcast, which revealed the true episode title.)	Tomo Ōkubo	Tomo Ōkubo	October 11, 2025	3.5%
162	3	"The Final Boss!!"; Transliteration: "Rasu Bosu!!" (Japanese: ラスボス!!)	Nanami Michibata & Michiru Itabisashi	Nanami Michibata, Kōhei Hirota (Note: Credited as Hiro) & Sōta Shigetsugu (Note: Credited as Hone Hone)	October 18, 2025	3.5%
163	4	"Quirk: Explosion!!"; Transliteration: ""Kosei"!! Bakuha!!" (Japanese: "個性"!!爆破!!)	Masayuki Otsuki	Masayuki Otsuki	October 25, 2025	3.3%
164	5	"History's Greatest Villain"; Transliteration: "Shijō Saiaku no Viran" (Japanese: 史上最悪の敵(ヴィラン))	Tsuyoshi Tobita	Naomi Nakayama & Haruka Iida	November 1, 2025	3.7%
165	6	"Wrench It Open, Izuku Midoriya!!"; Transliteration: "Kojiakero! Midoriya Izuku!!" (Japanese: こじ開けろ！緑谷出久!!)	Shōji Ikeno	Shōji Ikeno	November 8, 2025	3.1%
166	7	"From Aizawa"; Transliteration: "Aizawa-kun kara" (Japanese: 相澤くんから)	Tomo Ōkubo	Tomo Ōkubo	November 15, 2025	3.3%
167	8	"Izuku Midoriya Rising"; Transliteration: "Midoriya Izuku: Raijingu" (Japanese: 緑谷出久：ライジング)	Michiru Itabisashi & Naomi Nakayama	Haruka Iida	November 22, 2025	3.5%
168	9	"Epilogue, The Hellish Todoroki Family: Final"; Transliteration: "Epirōgu / Jigoku no Todoroki-kun-chi: Fainaru" (Japanese: エピローグ/地獄の轟くん家・FINAL)	Hanako Ueda	Hanako Ueda	November 29, 2025	4.3%
169	10	"The Girl Who Loves Smiles"; Transliteration: "Egao ga Sukina Onnanoko" (Japanese: 笑顔が好きな女の子)	Tsuyoshi Tobita	Kenji Nagasaki	December 6, 2025	3.4%
170	11	"My Hero Academia"; Transliteration: "Boku no Hīrō Akademia" (Japanese: 僕のヒーローアカデミア)	Masayuki Otsuki	Naomi Nakayama	December 13, 2025	4.5%

=== Bonus special (2026) ===
No.	Title	Directed by	Storyboarded by	Original release date	Viewership rating
170+1	"More"	Naomi Nakayama	Naomi Nakayama & Tomo Ōkubo	May 2, 2026	2.7%
Ochaco wakes up from a recurring dream where she is visited by Toga. She is accompanied by Tsuyu and the Big 3 for one of her Quirk counselling classes, as they help play with the children. Later, Ochaco talks to Tsuyu about her dreams with Toga, believing that her spirit lives on within her and that she is trying to tell her something. At the same time, Izuku is riding in Bakugo's car with Kirishima, where the three talk about their current careers. Bakugo roundaboutly tries to invite Izuku to his hero agency, but he turns him down, deciding to continue being a teacher while being a Pro Hero part-time. Bakugo then tells Izuku he should start thinking more about what he most wants to do personally beyond work. The former students of Class A meet at a restaurant to celebrate Shoto becoming No. 2 on the Hero Billboard Chart, casually chatting about their own respective placements and the roles of Heroes in this current time period. Shoto talks about his own growth after everything he has gone through, revealing he has started taking bowl making classes, to expand his personal hobbies. When talks of romance are brought up, Izuku starts to think about Bakugo's words, and his eyes linger on Ochaco. Just then, they receive a notification of a nearby carjacking, and all the Heroes suit up together, swiftly dealing with the incident. As everyone heads their separate ways home, Ochaco thinks about how she wishes she could have spent more time talking to Izuku, when suddenly he appears behind her. He confesses that despite how much he cares for everyone, he realizes he wants to spend more time with Ochaco. She then remembers the words from Toga's vestige, encouraging her to be true to her feelings and giving her a push. Ochaco confesses she feels the same way as Izuku, and the two happily embrace their hands together.

== OVAs ==
An original video animation (OVA) titled "Save! Rescue Training!" was shown at the Jump Festa '16 event on November 27, 2016, and released on April 4, 2017, which bundled with the limited edition of the 13th volume of the manga. A second OVA was released on June 2, 2017, bundled with a limited edition of the 14th volume of the manga. It focuses on a joint practice session between Izuku's class and the other hero department students at U.A. Academy. A third OVA, "All Might: Rising," was released on February 13, 2019. It was bundled with the first film's blu-ray set, and adapted its prequel manga. It was two minutes long. A two-part original net animation (ONA) titled "Make It! Do-or-Die Survival Training," were released on August 16, 2020, with the returning staff and cast from season 4; they were streamed simultaneously by Funimation from the Japanese release. Another OVA was included with the "Plus Ultra" edition of My Hero Academia: World Heroes' Mission in Japan.

Two new OVA episodes, were given screenings in Japan from June 16–19, 2022. Internationally, Crunchyroll premiered the episodes at Anime Expo on July 1, 2022. A worldwide streaming release premiered on August 1, 2022. A special OVA episode, titled "UA Heroes Battle," premiered with an English dub at the New York Comic Con on October 13, 2023. The episode has given screenings in Japan from October 20–26, 2023. Crunchyroll streamed it with English subtitles and dub on November 30 of the same year. An OVA based on the bonus manga chapter "A Piece of Cake" was included with the deluxe "Plus Ultra" edition of My Hero Academia: You're Next in Japan. An OVA short based on the one-shot manga chapter from the Ultra Age fanbook, titled "I Am a Hero Too," was publicly released on August 3, 2026. The OVA received screenings at Anime Expo on July 4, and be screened again at the "Character Match Up" event in Japan on August 1 and 2. Crunchyroll also streamed it with English subtitles and dub on August 2 of the same year.

No.	Title	Directed by (Note: Production staff information is taken from the ending credits of each OVA.)	Storyboarded by	Original release date
1	"Save! Rescue Training!"; Transliteration: "Sukue! Kyūjo Kunren!" (Japanese: 救え!救助訓練!)	Satoshi Takafuji	Katsuyuki Kodera	November 27, 2016 (event); April 4, 2017 (DVD)
Four days after the villains' invasion at the U.S.J., Class 1-A returns there to resume their rescue training. Thirteen and Aizawa oversee the exercises, however, a mysterious villain who had apparently been hiding in the complex since the U.S.J. incident takes out Todoroki and attacks the class. Although Thirteen and Aizawa urge the students to run away, they instead take on the villain together. When this fails, Midoriya devises a strategy to rescue Todoroki and attack the villain at the same time, resulting in him getting stuck onto Mineta's spheres. The villain then reveals himself to be All Might in disguise and had planned this as a "surprise" for the students so they could stay on their toes following the U.S.J. attack; the students are annoyed by the deception.
2	"Training of the Dead"; Transliteration: "Torēningu obu za Deddo" (Japanese: トレーニング・オブ・ザ・デッド)	Ikurō Satō	Shinji Ishihira	June 2, 2017
After the hero internships, Aizawa announces that Class 1-A will participate in an amicable training exercise alongside four heroes-in-training from Isamu High School. One of them is Tsuyu's old friend, the snakelike Habuko, while another student, Fujimi, instantly clashes with Bakugo. All Might explains that the training exercise will split the twenty-four students into six groups of four, with the goal just being to outlast all the other teams. Since the survival battle royale setup puts Midoriya's team (composed of him, Uraraka, Tsuyu, and Ashido) at a disadvantage, they decide to lie low. Meanwhile, Bakugo quickly takes out a couple of other teams, but during a clash with the Isamu students, Fujimi releases his "Zombie Virus" Quirk which turns people into zombie-like creatures. As all the students become eventually infected by the virus, including Fujimi himself, only Midoriya, Todoroki, Uraraka, and Ashido manage to escape; even All Might's attempt to rescue them fails when he transforms into his skeletal form, which is confused as being a zombie by the actual zombies. The four survivors hole up in a cave, and just as Midoriya and Todoroki stage a frontal attack on the zombies, the effects of the Zombie Virus are reversed and the students are returned to normal. With the training exercise concluded and everyone's injuries patched up, the Isamu students bid farewell to 1-A, while an injured Midoriya still lies in bed, having been attacked by a rage-induced Bakugo.
3	"All Might: Rising"; Transliteration: "Ōru Maito: Raijingu" (Japanese: オールマイト：ライジング)	Kenji Nagasaki	Kenji Nagasaki	February 13, 2019
During her final battle with All For One, Nana Shimura pushes her pupil, Toshinori Yagi, out of danger. Toshinori calls out to his master as Gran Torino swoops in and flies him away. Nana turns to her successor and with one last smile, reminds him that she is counting on him to save the world. Nana turns to face her nemesis as the evil mastermind thanks her for entertaining him and finishes her off with a powerful explosion. While mourning his master, Gran Torino tells Toshinori that once he graduates from U.A. to leave the country to evade All For One. That spring, after graduating, Toshinori is about to travel to America, styling his hair into what would become his iconic hairdo and dons his master's signature smile. After taking off, Toshinori promises to return to Japan and save everyone with all his might. Note: This OVA is a one-shot that delves further into All Might's past released alongside My Hero Academia: Two Heroes.
4	"Make It! Do-or-Die Survival Training, Part 1"; Transliteration: "Ikinokore! Kesshi no Sabaibaru Kunren - Zenpen" (Japanese: 生き残れ！決死のサバイバル訓練 前編)	Shōji Ikeno	Shinji Ishihira	August 16, 2020
In preparation for Class 1-A's Provisional Hero License Exam, Eraser Head decides to give the class a training exercise on disaster rescue, due to previous license exams having a disaster rescue test in most cases. The class is split into two teams of ten students: Team A consisting of Midoriya, Bakugo, Todoroki, Ida, Uraraka, Asui, Kaminari, Kirishima, Tokoyami, and Yaoyorozu. Team A is tasked with rescuing a training dummy from a six-floor shopping mall constructed in Ground Beta. Two hours prior, a fire broke out at the bottom floor, and all the other civilians barring the dummy were evacuated. The fire caused the building's power to be knocked out, but the emergency power is still functional. The building's mobile relay station is also down, preventing the student's from contacting each other through their cell phones. Team A decides to split up into smaller groups and search each floor one-by-one for the training dummy. As Midoriya states that their real training is about to begin, a wall cracks open and water starts to pour into the mall.
5	"Make It! Do-or-Die Survival Training, Part 2"; Transliteration: "Ikinokore! Kesshi no Sabaibaru Kunren - Kōhen" (Japanese: 生き残れ！決死のサバイバル訓練 後編)	Ikurō Satō	Shinji Ishihira	August 16, 2020
In the middle of their search, water begins to rise from the bottom of the facility, and the walls all around start to quake, splitting everyone up. Ida ends up injured, and a group of the students reach the elevator, using it to get them out of their, while Midoriya goes to search for the others. Outside, Eraser Head reveals that the incident was an unintentional accident for their exercise, while also telling them to be cautious, aware that they'll be facing much worse as Heroes. Meanwhile, Bakugo, Kirishima, and Kaminari manage to re-activate the power and locate the dummy, just as the water begins to rise in the lower floors. The former two manage to escape first, while Bakugo is reluctantly aided by Todoroki and Midoriya to flee the rest of the flood using Todoroki's ice. However, due to the impact upon landing, Bakugo's leg is crushed by debris, and eventually gives in to being helped by Midoriya after his insistence. The remaining students successfully reach the surface, completely the training exercise. Eraser Head proudly looks at Team A, planning to build more challenges for them to overcome in preparation for their license exam.
6	"Departure"; Transliteration: "Tabidachi" (Japanese: 旅立ち)	Kenji Nagasaki	Kenji Nagasaki	February 16, 2022
Midoriya, Bakugo, and Todoroki await at the airport heading to Otheon for their "World Heroes Mission" with the rest of the Endeavor Agency. After running into Hawks and Tokoyami, who are chased off by screaming fans, Endeavor arrives to meet his three trainees. Shoto, Bakugo, and Endeavor proceed to get into a heated argument over what the seating arrangement should be, until Hawks returns to resolve the petty fighting, giving them an order to everyone's most satisfaction. Everyone heads off on their flight in preparation for what's to come, while in Otheon, a parkouring Rody notices a plane above, muttering that it is too noisy. Note: This OVA is adapted from the one-shot manga prequel to My Hero Academia: World Heroes' Mission.
7	"HLB <Hero League Baseball>"; Transliteration: "Hīrō Rīgu Bēsubōru" (Japanese: ヒーローリーグベースボール)	Ikurō Satō	Shinji Satō & Tomohiro Kamitani	June 16, 2022 (theatrical); August 1, 2022 (streaming)
The "Hero League Baseball" is an organization set-up by several Pro Heroes to allow them the chance to play and compete in their spare time. The finals for this year are against bitter rivals Gang Orca and Shishido, each determined to take the win over the other. Gang Orca's "Orcas" include his Agency trainees, as well as members of Team Lurkers, while Shishido's "Lionels" include his Agency trainees, and members of Fat Gum's Agency. Present Mic narrates the game, accompanied by an extremely apathetic Eraser Head, explaining the rules, including that full Quirk use is fair, and that if a player is knocked out they are out of the game. The game ends up becoming incredibly brutal as the players freely use their Quirks to their advantage, and promptly being pummelled by their team captain upon their failures. Almost all the players end up also being knocked unconscious due to the tenacity involved, leaving Gang Orca and Shishido the only ones remaining. Right as the game is tied 1-1, they are suddenly alerted to a bank robber escaping nearby. Without hesitating, the two Heroes speed off and swiftly work together to take out the thug, leaving him to the remaining players to watch over. The two return to the field for their final pitch, however both Heroes end up knocked unconscious by their throw and swing, ending the game in a tie; despite this outcome, they each declare their love for baseball, while the rest of the players return home in agony.
8	"Laugh! As If You Are in Hell"; Transliteration: "Warae! Jigoku no Yō ni" (Japanese: 笑え！地獄のように)	Masashi Abe	Masashi Abe	June 16, 2022 (theatrical); August 1, 2022 (streaming)
During Midoriya's time at the Endeavor Agency, they are requested to deal with a threat known as "Mr. Smiley", a graffiti artist whose "Smile" Quirk allows him to make anyone who sees him laugh non-stop for two hours whenever they see him, with the police unable to stop him. Endeavor blows the request off, believing it to be beneath him, however after Mr. Smiley vandalizes his house, he tasks his entire force with tracking him down. The Endeavor Agency manage to locate him, but all of them become a victim of his Smile Quirk, letting him escape. Afterwards, Midoriya calls in Mei Hatsume to use a robot to try and apprehend him, but that fails as the robot is also vulnerable to his Quirk. Humiliated, Endeavor and Bakugo prepare a plan to take Mr. Smiley down without having to look at him. Meanwhile, Midoriya learns more about him, discovering that he was a former art student down on hard times, and recognizing him as being similar to himself, doing anything to accomplish his dreams. The Endeavor Agency tracks Mr. Smiley down once again to a commercial building, with Bakugo successfully able to overpower him, however Midoriya stops him before he can destroy Mr. Smiley's art piece. Midoriya confronts Mr. Smiley about his crimes, while also sympathizing over his love for his art, which gets through to him. Just then, the commercial building is attacked by bank robbers who shoot up the place. In retaliation, Mr. Smiley uses his Quirk on them, stopping them in their tracks with laughter, allowing them to be apprehended. Mr. Smiley turns himself in as well, wanting to atone for his crimes, and after being praised as a hero on the local live news, accidentally activates his Quirk, resulting in hysterical laughter all across the country.
9	"UA Heroes Battle"; Transliteration: "Yūei Hīrōzu Batoru" (Japanese: 雄英ヒーローズ・バトル)	Tsuyoshi Tobita	Shinji Ishihira & Takashi Kawabata	October 20, 2023 (theatrical); November 30, 2023 (streaming)
As New Year's approaches, Class 1-A laments the cancellation of the annual celebration and being forced to remain in their dorms in lieu of all the recent villain attacks. Mirio then surprises them with something to keep them entertained: a card game created by the Support and Business Courses featuring the hero students and other Pro Heroes, who act out their battles on a digital battlefield created by Mei. All the students end up getting engrossed in the action as they use the cards based on themselves and others to fight one another. Bakugo eventually arrives, and learning about the game, forcefully challenges Midoriya to see which of their cards is better. The A.I. Midoriya and Bakugo end up battling to a standstill, annoying their real selves due to recognizing how much their skill has grown. For the final challenge, Bakugo pulls out an All Might card, while Midoriya gets a dog, however the A.I. All Might simply rescues the dog and escapes the battlefield, ending in another draw. Bakugo destroys the card game in fury, while Aizawa later bans all card games.
10	"A Piece of Cake"; Transliteration: "A Pīsu obu Keiku" (Japanese: アピースオブケイク)	Tensai Okamura	Tensai Okamura	February 19, 2025
The Class 1-A trained their Quirks in preparation to take down the remaining members of the League of Villains and the Paranormal Liberation Front. Midoriya noted the hypotheticals regarding his classmates' Quirks and the team-up situations, which impressed most of them. Bakugo argued to this that a team-up with Todoroki would make the pair invincible, and claimed his technique outclasses Todoroki's who tried to convince him about developing the Ultimate Moves under similar mindsets, which angered Bakugo further. All Might approaches the class while wondering about the current generation of Heroes, as the students heads off on their armored van to track down the Villains. Note: This OVA is adapted from the one-shot manga prequel to My Hero Academia: You're Next.
11	"I Am a Hero Too"	Tomo Ōkubo	Naomi Nakayama	July 4, 2026 (theatrical); August 3, 2026 (streaming)
Eri, now a teenager and being raised by Mandalay, visits U.A. to deliver the Pussycats' "paw-buns" to Aizawa as thanks for taking care of her as a child. Eri also greets All Might - who is now the vice principal - Present Mic, and Cementoss, and tells them that she hopes that Deku and Lemillion will be able to make her concert that night. The five watch a television broadcast, where Deku's first ranking since his debut is announced, all the way up at number four. Bakugo has risen from number fifteen to number five, and top three heroes remain as Lemillion, Shoto, and Mt. Lady; Deku, Bakugo, and Shoto are being filmed partaking in a mission together. Eri smiles at how well Lemillion and Deku are doing, and strives to be a hero in her own way as a musician. During Eri's concert, she and two of her friends sing Jiro's "Hero too", with Lemillion, Deku, Bakugo, Shoto, Mandalay, Kota, Aizawa, Present Mic, Jiro, and Kaminari among those in attendance, and Ochaco, Tsuyu, and Sato watching online. Note: This OVA is adapted from the one-shot bonus manga chapter in My Hero Academia: Ultra Age – The Final Fan Book.

== Home media release ==
=== Japanese ===
Toho Animation (Japan – Region 2/A)
Volume	Episodes	Release date	Ref.
Season 1
1	1–3	June 29, 2016	
2	4–6	July 13, 2016	
3	7–9	August 17, 2016	
4	10–11	September 14, 2016	
5	12–13	October 12, 2016	
Season 2
1	14–17	July 19, 2017	
2	18–20	August 9, 2017	
3	20–23	September 13, 2017	
4	24–26	October 18, 2017	
5	27–29	November 15, 2017	
6	30–32	December 13, 2017	
7	33–35	January 17, 2018	
8	36–38	February 14, 2018	
Season 3
1	39–42	July 18, 2018	
2	43–45	August 15, 2018	
3	46–48	September 19, 2018	
4	49–51	October 17, 2018	
5	52–54	November 14, 2018	
6	55–57	December 19, 2018	
7	58–60	January 16, 2019	
8	61–63	February 13, 2019	
Season 4
1	64–68	January 22, 2020	
2	69–72	February 19, 2020	
3	73–76	March 18, 2020	
4	77–80	April 15, 2020	
5	81–84	May 20, 2020	
6	85–88	August 19, 2020	
Season 5
1	89–95	July 21, 2021	
2	96–101	September 22, 2021	
3	102–107	November 24, 2021	
4	108–113	January 19, 2022	
Season 6
1	114–120	January 18, 2023	
2	121–126	March 15, 2023	
3	127–132	May 17, 2023	
4	133–138	July 19, 2023	
Season 7
1	139–145	July 17, 2024	
2	146–152	October 16, 2024	
3	153–159	December 18, 2024	
Season 8
1	160–165	February 18, 2026	
2	166–170 + "More"	May 20, 2026	

=== English ===
Crunchyroll, LLC (North America – Region 1/A)
Part	Episodes	Release date	Ref.
Season 1
Limited Edition	1–13	April 18, 2017	
Standard Edition	1–13	April 18, 2017	
Complete	1–13	April 18, 2017	
Season 2
1	13.5–25	April 3, 2018	
2	26–38	June 5, 2018	
Complete	13.5–38	September 17, 2020	
Season 3
1	39–50	May 7, 2019	
2	51–63	September 3, 2019	
Complete	39–63	November 10, 2020	
Season 4
1	64–76	September 29, 2020	
2	77–88	February 16, 2021	
Complete	64–88	February 15, 2022	
Season 5
1	89–101	March 29, 2022	
2	102–113	December 19, 2022	
Complete	89–113	October 14, 2024	
Season 6
1	114–126	December 19, 2023	
2	127–138	August 27, 2024	
Complete	114–138	October 21, 2025	
Season 7
1	139–150	June 17, 2025	
2	151–159	November 18, 2025	
Complete	139–159	October 20, 2026	

Universal Pictures UK (Limited Edition) / Manga Entertainment (Standard Edition) (United Kingdom & Ireland – Region 2/B)
Part	Episodes	Release date	Ref.
Season 1
Limited Edition	1–13	May 15, 2017	
Standard Edition	1–13	June 10, 2019	
Season 2
1	13.5–25	April 2, 2018	
2	26–38	June 11, 2018	
Complete	13.5–38	September 21, 2020	
Season 3
1	39–50	May 13, 2019	
2	51–63	September 9, 2019	
Complete	39–63	November 16, 2020	
Season 4
1	64-76	October 5, 2020	
2	77–88	March 8, 2021	
Complete	64–88	February 21, 2022	

Manga Entertainment (Collection) (United Kingdom & Ireland - Region 2/B)
Seasons	Episodes	Release date	Ref.
1–3	1–63	November 16, 2020	

Universal Sony / Madman Entertainment (Australia & New Zealand – Region 4/B)
Part	Episodes	Release date	Ref.
Season 1
Limited Edition	1–13	May 17, 2017	
Standard Edition	1–13	August 15, 2018 (Universal Sony); December 4, 2019 (Madman)	
Season 2
1 (Limited Edition)	13.5–25	May 9, 2018	
2 (Limited Edition)	26–38	June 13, 2018	
1	13.5–25	August 15, 2018 (Universal Sony); December 4, 2019 (Madman)	
2	26–38	August 15, 2018; December 4, 2019 (Madman)	
Season 3
1	39–50	August 7, 2019	
2	51–63	November 6, 2019	
Season 4
1	64–76	December 9, 2020	
2	77–88	April 21, 2021	
Season 5
1	89–101	May 25, 2022	
2	102–113	February 8, 2023	
Season 6
1	114–126	February 7, 2024	
2	127–138	October 16, 2024	
Season 7
1	139–150	August 6, 2025	
2	151–159	January 7, 2026	
