= T. R. Otsuka =

Japanese garden builder

T. R. Ōtsuka
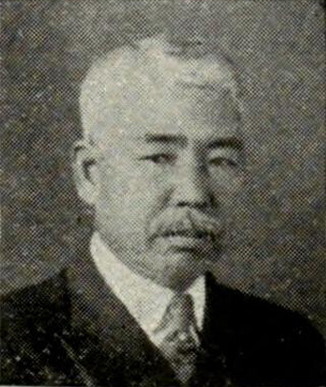
- T. R. Ōtsuka, c.1914
- Born: Tarō Ōtsuka 大塚太郎; 1868; Kōchi, Kōchi Prefecture, Shikoku, Japan
- Died: c. 1940s
- Occupation: Japanese garden builder
- Notable work: Fabyan Japanese garden (Geneva, IL); Stan Hywet Japanese garden (Akron, OH); Japanese Pavilion garden, 1933–1934 Century of Progress Exhibition (Chicago, IL)

T. R. Ōtsuka 大塚 太郎 (Ōtsuka Tarō) (1868 – c. 1940s?) was a Japanese garden builder. After emigrating from Japan to the United States in 1897 and moving to Chicago around 1905, he built dozens of Japanese-style gardens and rock gardens, mostly in the Midwest, between 1905 and the mid-1930s. His most notable projects were the Japanese-style garden of George and Nelle Fabyan in Geneva, Illinois (c. 1910); the Japanese Garden at Stan Hywet in Akron, Ohio (1916); the garden of Milton Tootle, Jr. in Mackinac Island, Michigan (before 1910); and the official Japanese pavilion garden at the 1933–1934 Century of Progress Exposition in Chicago, Illinois.

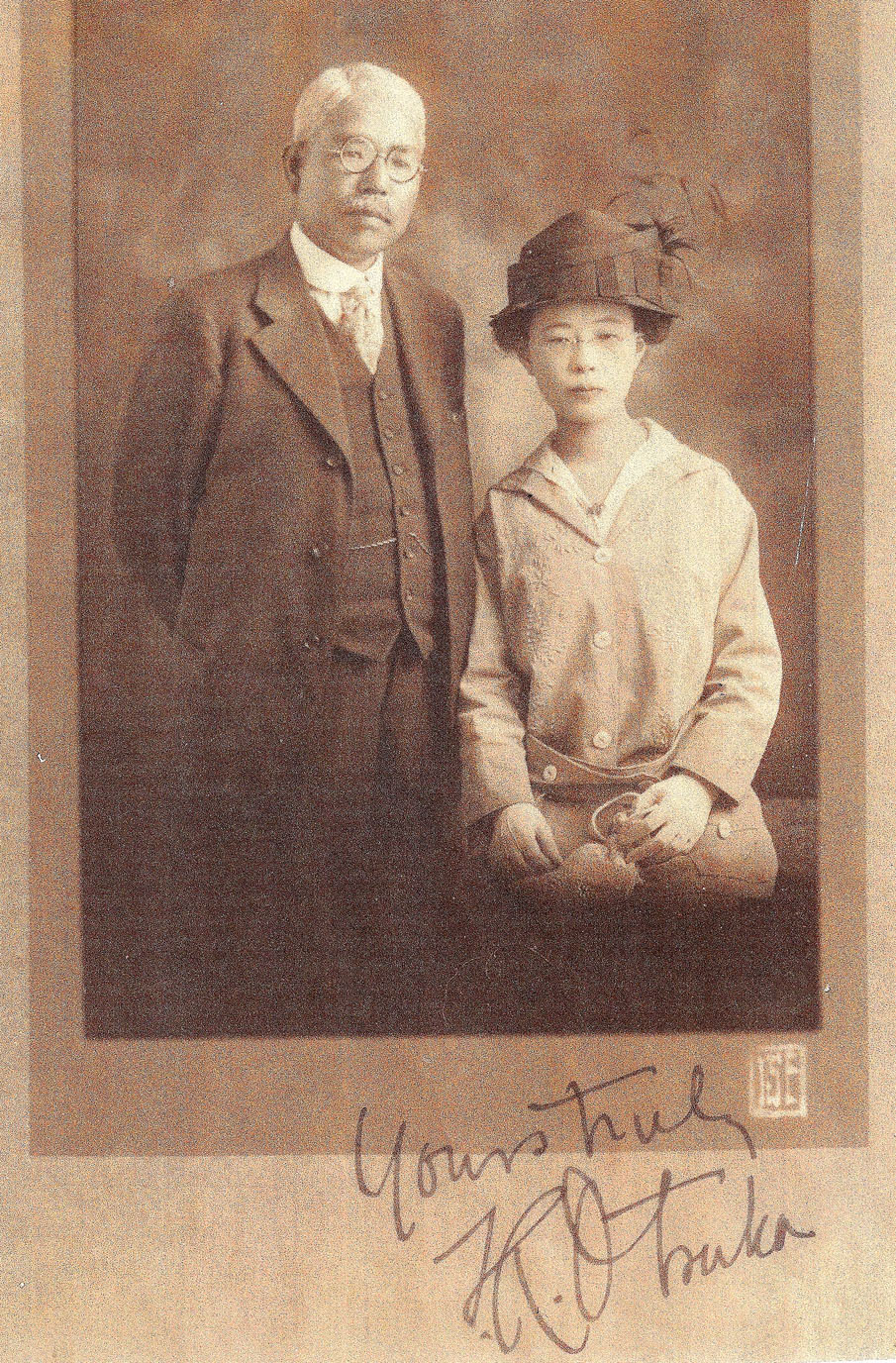
Tarō Ōtsuka and his wife Yoneko around 1925

== Early life in Japan ==
Tarō Ōtsuka was born in 1868 in the city of Kōchi in Kōchi Prefecture, on the island of Shikoku, Japan. According to his 1897 passport record, his father was Katsunobu Ōtsuka (大塚勝宜)—this was his formal samurai name; his everyday name was Shōsaburō Ōtsuka (大塚庄三郎)—a high-ranked Tosa Domain samurai retainer until the Meiji Restoration, which occurred in the year of Tarō Ōtsuka's birth. Also, a 1924 Nichibei Jihō article mentions that "…Tarō Ōtsuka was a Tosa Clan samurai." Additionally, his connections with several other high-ranked former samurai-class residents of Kōchi—journalist Kayano Nagatomo, who was a Japanese supporter of Sun Yat-sen and was likely Ōtsuka's cousin; politician Kenkichi Kataoka; and politician Gotō Shōjirō—make it likely his family was also of similar rank. Kayano’s father went into the mining business with a relative named Ōtsuka, who may have been Tarō Ōtsuka’s father.

Ōtsuka did not apprentice as a gardener in Japan, according to landscape professor Keiji Uehara, who met him when visiting the United States around 1921 to document overseas Japanese-style garden work:

Ōtsuka was a Kōchi citizen…while dealing with a wide variety of stone materials as a miner rather than a gardener, he became interested in the stonework in gardens. He began to create shoreline stonework and garden ponds. After that, he gained popularity by arranging urushi-lacquered (vermilion) taiko bridges, urushi-lacquered torii gates, stone lanterns, and weeping willows in small areas.

Uehara also writes in the same book that "Tarō Ōtsuka...built many unique Japanese gardens in the central region of the United States. But he was self-taught."

He likely did some of his early garden work in Japan, as an advertisement he placed in the April 1917 issue of Country Life claimed that Japanese and rock gardens were "My specialty for thirty years", implying that he had begun building gardens by 1887, ten years before he emigrated to the United States.

Ōtsuka was married to Yoneko Kamura by 1897. They did not have any children, according to the 1920 US census.

== Life and work in America ==
Ōtsuka emigrated to the United States in 1897. He arrived in the Port of Seattle, Washington from Kobe, Japan aboard the Kamakura Maru on December 21, 1897, and settled in Tacoma, Washington. After several years working in Tacoma, he brought his wife to the US in July 1900. They moved to Chicago around 1905, perhaps after attending the 1904 World’s Fair in St. Louis.

Ōtsuka likely began building rock gardens and Japanese-style gardens in the Chicago area soon after 1905, based on the date of his known and probable projects. During his career, Ōtsuka built numerous gardens in the Midwestern states, Florida, and upstate New York. As T. R. Ōtsuka, he advertised widely between 1911 and the early 1930s in national magazines including Country Life, House Beautiful, and The Garden.

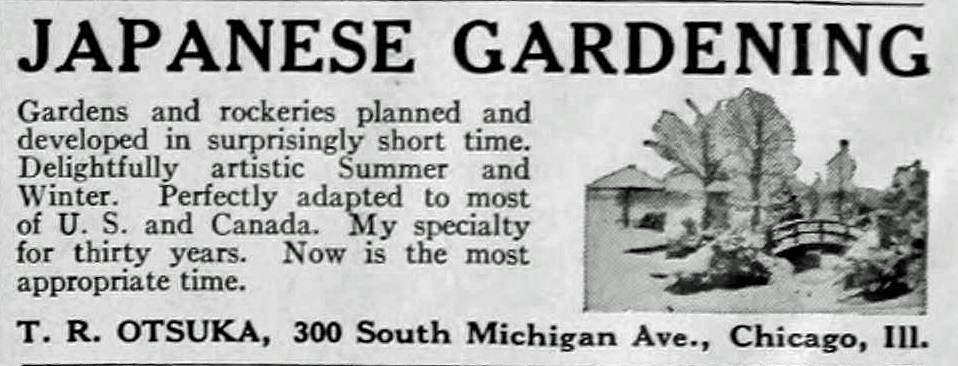
Ōtsuka's advertisement in Country Life, April 1917

Clay Lancaster comments on Ōtsuka:

The Midwest has participated less vigorously than the East Coast in the Japanese garden movement. T.R. Otsuka, mentioned earlier for advertising himself as a Chicago "Japanese Garden Constructor" in a 1911 magazine, four years later had changed his title to "Japanese Landscape Architect"; and from a practitioner in "Quaint Japanese Style," he had become adept in "All styles, with a specialty to harmonize American ground." During the interim, he had learned that the hinterlands remained relatively provincial in accepting imported modes.

— Clay Lancaster, The Japanese Influence in America (1963), page 206

From 1911 to 1916, Ōtsuka's garden business address was in the Fine Arts Building at 414 South Michigan Avenue across from Grant Park in Chicago.

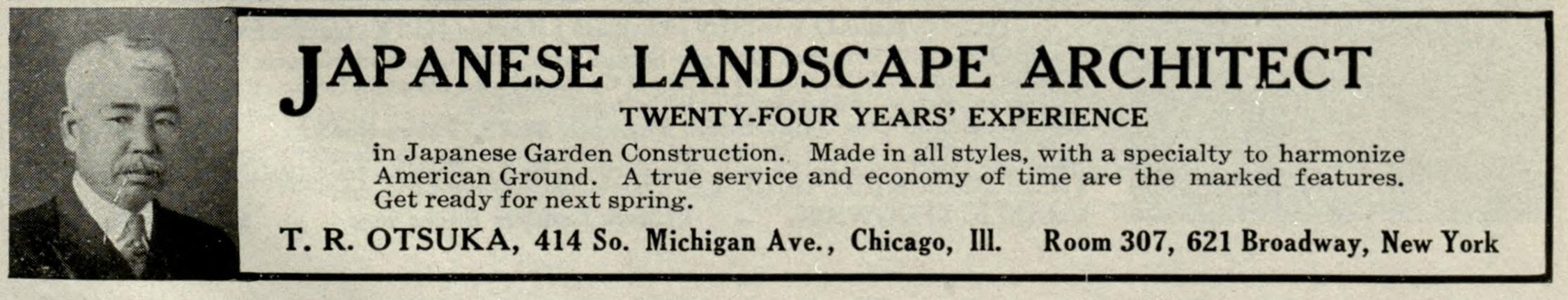
Advertisement in Keith's magazine, December 1914

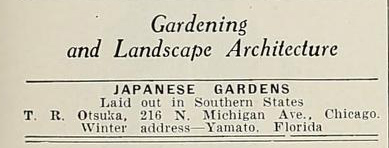
Advertisement for T. R. Ōtsuka, House & Garden, January 1923, showing his winter address in Florida

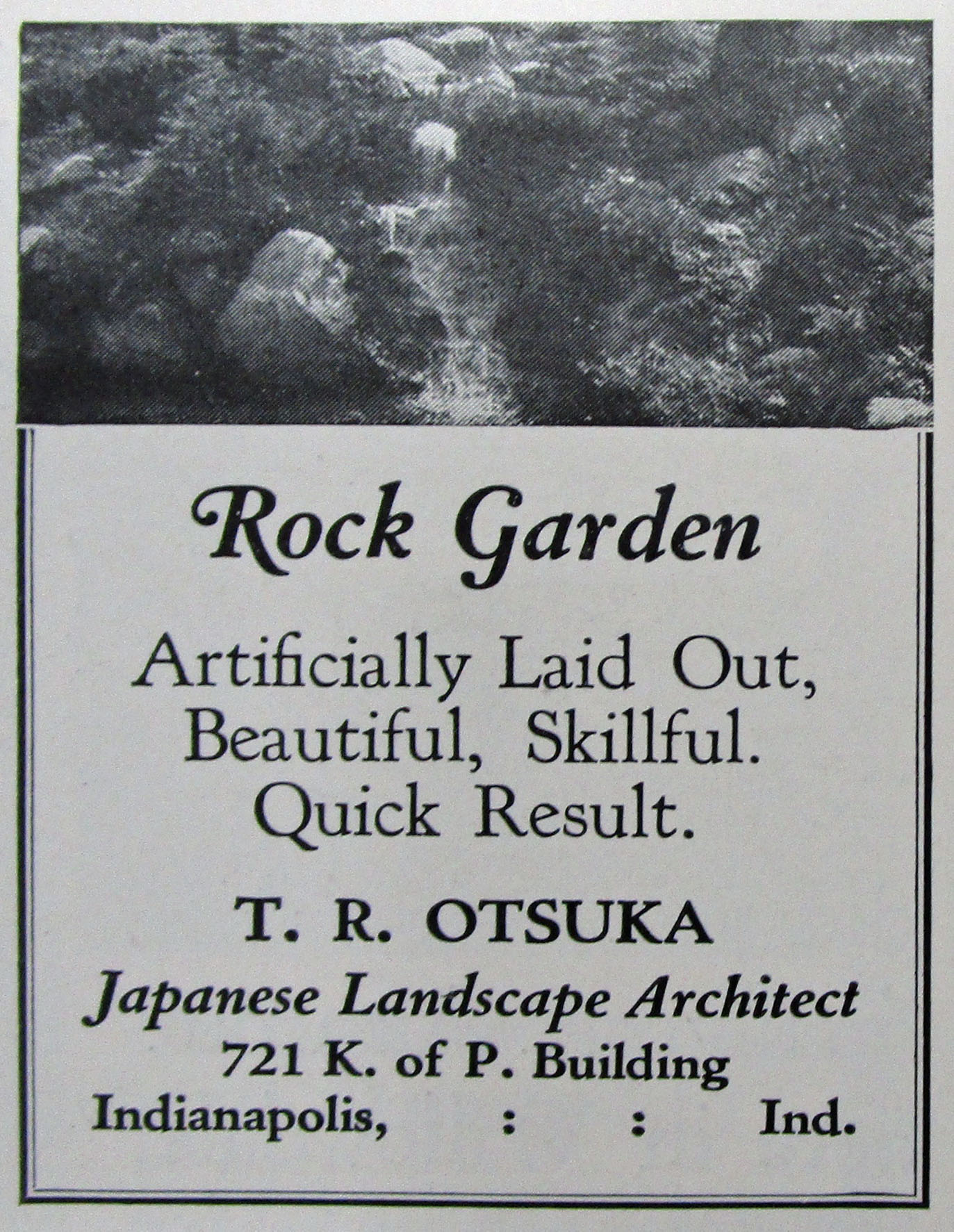
Advertisement for T. R. Ōtsuka rock gardens, Garden & Homebuilder, September 1927

From before 1910 to around 1930, Ōtsuka was associated with the D. Hill Nursery Company of Dundee, IL. The nursery, one of the oldest and largest suppliers of evergreen trees and shrubs in Illinois, included testimonials about Ōtsuka's skills in building rock gardens and Japanese-style gardens in its catalogs, and in return, Ōtsuka likely sourced the evergreens he used in his gardens from its nursery.

Beginning in the early 1920s, the Ōtsukas began spending winters in Yamato, Florida (a Japanese community near Miami), and they moved to New York City in late March 1924.

The Japanese government commissioned Ōtsuka to build the gardens around their official pavilion buildings at the Century of Progress Exposition in 1933. Prof. Kendall H. Brown states that "The Japanese pavilion featured a teahouse with small tea garden and the main pavilion with entry garden built by Tarō Ōtsuka, a Japanese living in Chicago who had constructed gardens throughout the midwest."

When and where Ōtsuka died is not known. His wife died on February 19, 1937, in Miami, Florida. Uehara writes, "After his wife's death, Mr. Ōtsuka returned to Japan alone and later went to China, but his whereabouts disappeared afterward."

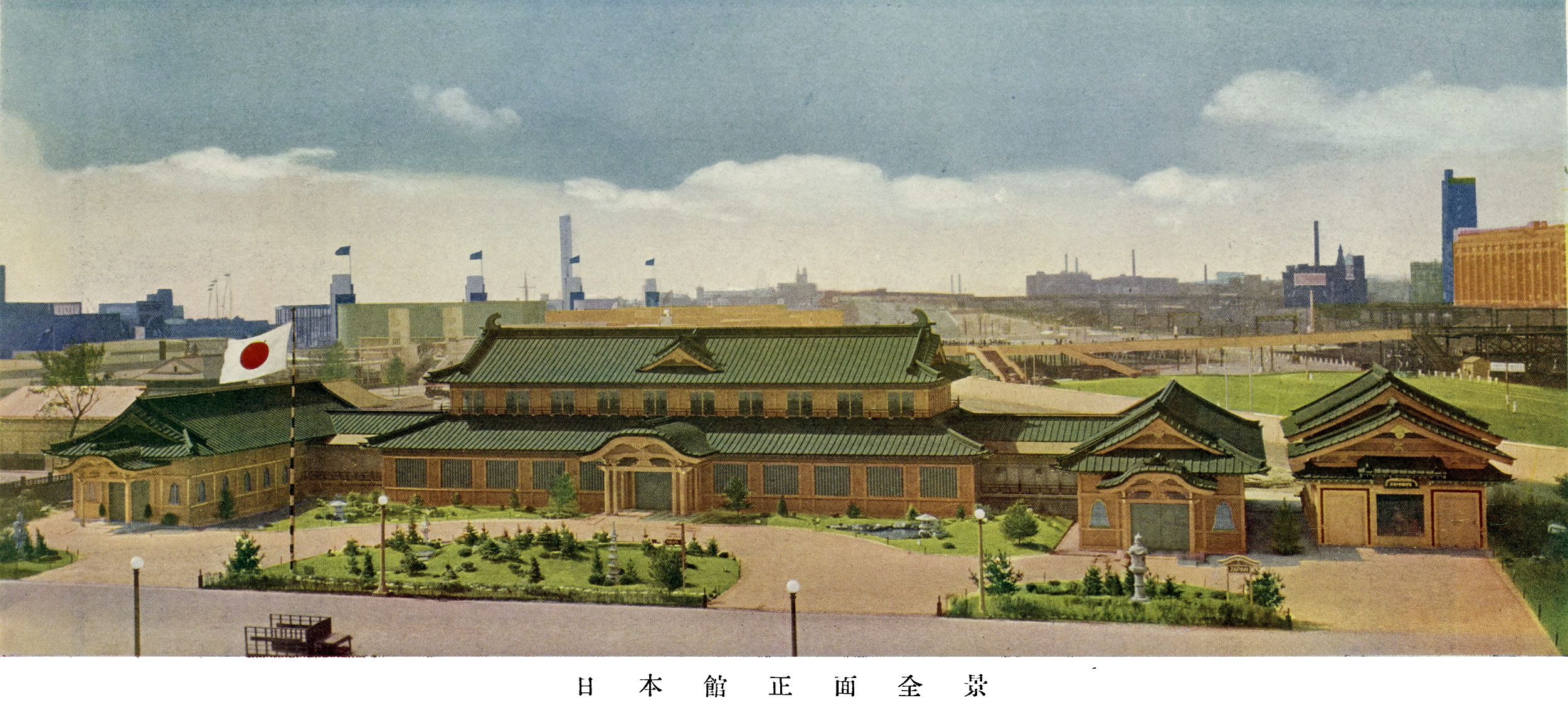
Japanese pavilion and gardens at the 1933 Century of Progress Exposition

== List of works ==
Documented garden projects in the United States (Japanese-style gardens unless otherwise noted, *asterisked projects are documented by inclusion in Ōtsuka's brochure, see below):

- c. 1905: Milton Tootle Garden, Mackinac Island, MI*
- c.1910: Fabyan Japanese Garden, Geneva, IL*
- c.1912: Mrs. L. F. Swift Garden, Lake Forest, IL*
- 1912: Hinata, Mrs. Clarence LeBus Garden, Lexington, KY*
- 1914: E. L. King Garden, Homer, Winona County, MN*
- c.1915: Mrs. Edward Morris Garden, Chicago, IL*
- c.1915: Harry M. Jones Garden, Western Springs, IL
- c.1915: R. D. Forgan Alpine Rock Garden, Highland Park, IL
- 1915: Higinbotham Japanese Garden, Joliet, IL*
- 1916: Stan Hywet Japanese Garden, Akron, OH*
- c.1917: Morton Japanese Garden, Lisle, IL*
- 1918: Laura Bradley Park Japanese Garden, Peoria, IL*
- c.1920: French Lick Springs Hotel Japanese Garden, IN
- c.1920: Holcomb Garden, Indianapolis, IN
- c.1920: David Hill Rock Garden Pond, Dundee, IL
- 1923: Woman’s Benefit Association Summer Camp, Lake Huron, MI
- 1927: Henry County Memorial Park, New Castle, IN
- 1933: Official Japanese Pavilion Garden, Century of Progress International Exposition, Chicago, IL

It is probable that Ōtsuka also built numerous rock gardens in varying styles in the Midwest, as he specifically advertised his skills in rock garden construction between 1915 and 1930.

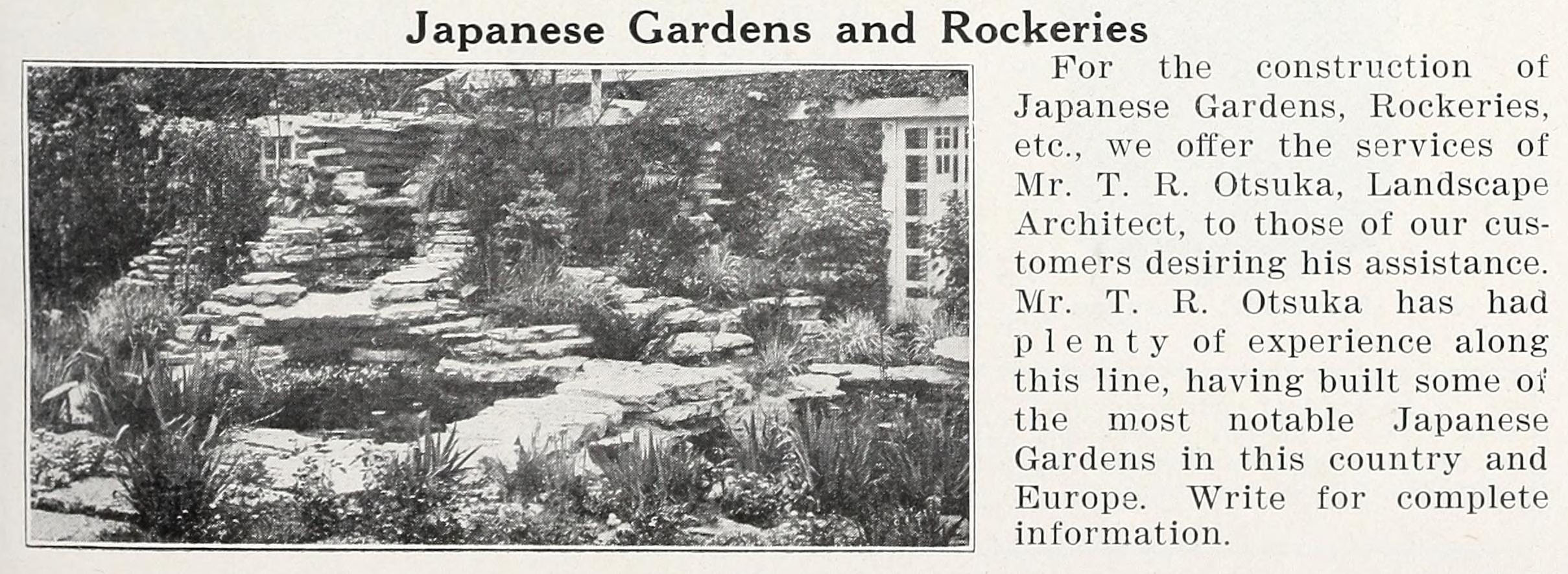
Testimonial for garden building services of T. R. Ōtsuka in D. Hill Nursery catalog (Dundee, IL), Spring 1918, page 25. This rock garden was built with stacked limestone slabs and shows that Ōtsuka built rock gardens in a wide range of styles.

== Photographs of garden work ==
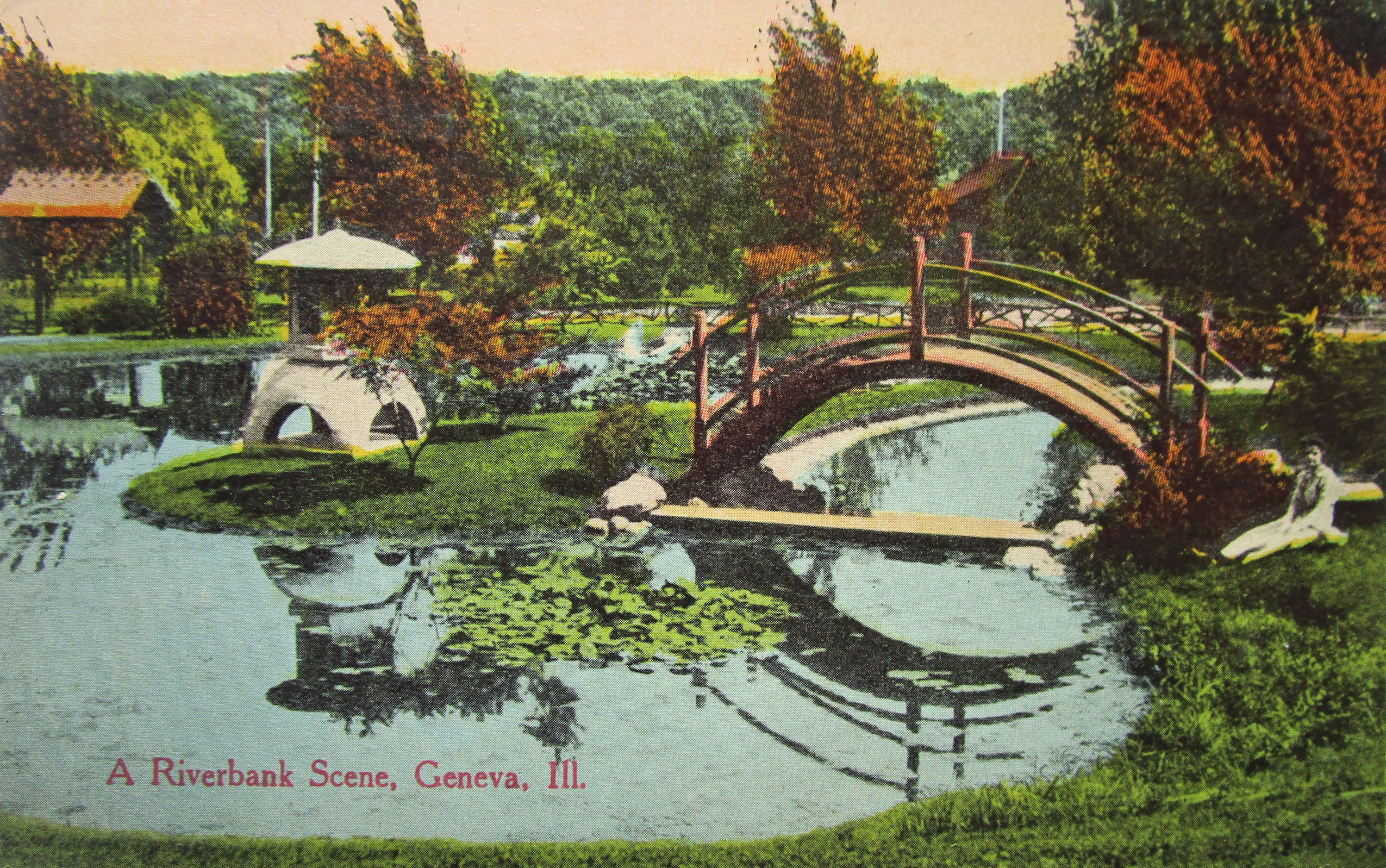
Fabyan Japanese garden, Geneva, IL (built between 1909 and 1915)

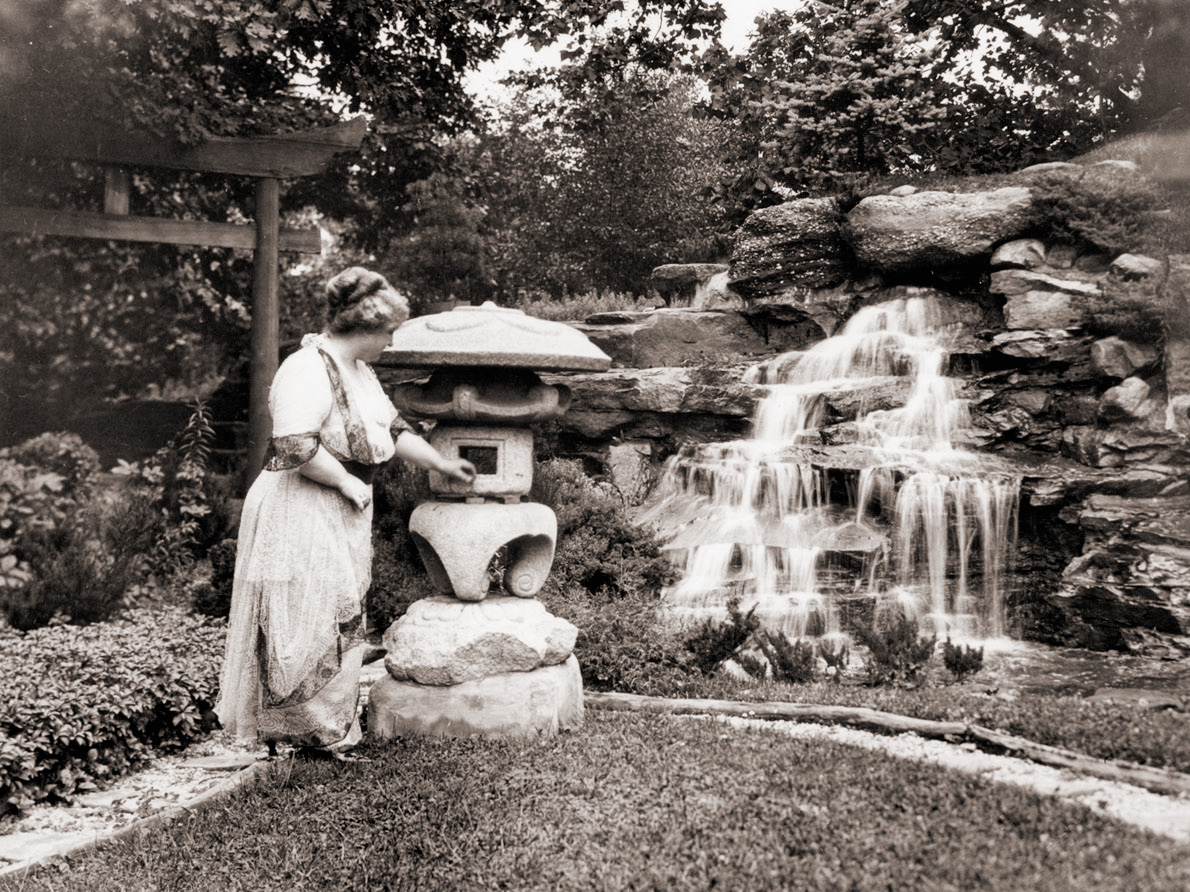
c.1920 photo of Mrs. F. A. Seiberling in Japanese garden at Stan Hywet Hall & Gardens (built in 1916)

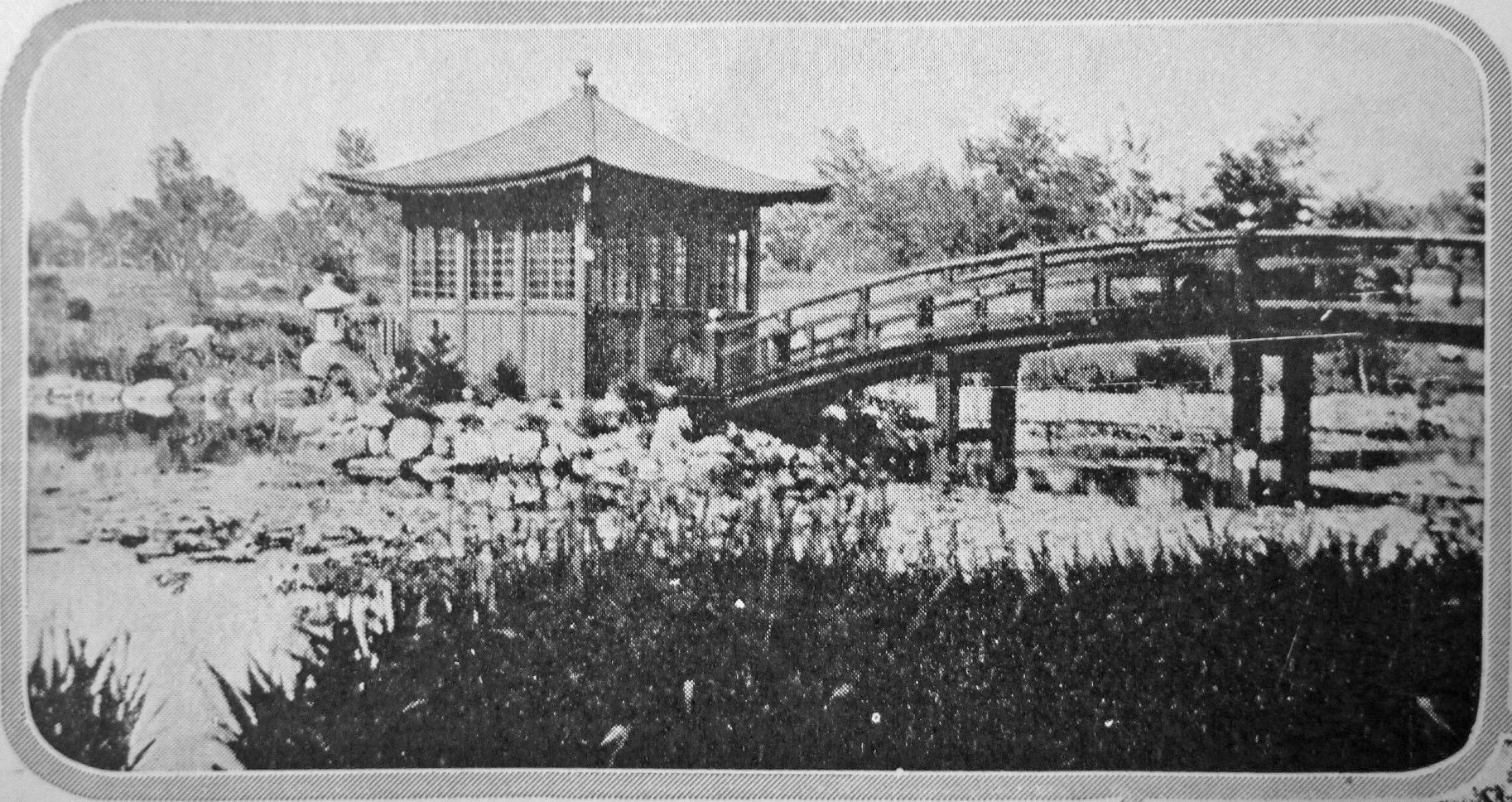
Japanese-style garden of Louis F. Swift in Lake Forest, IL, c.1919 (built between 1910 and 1914)

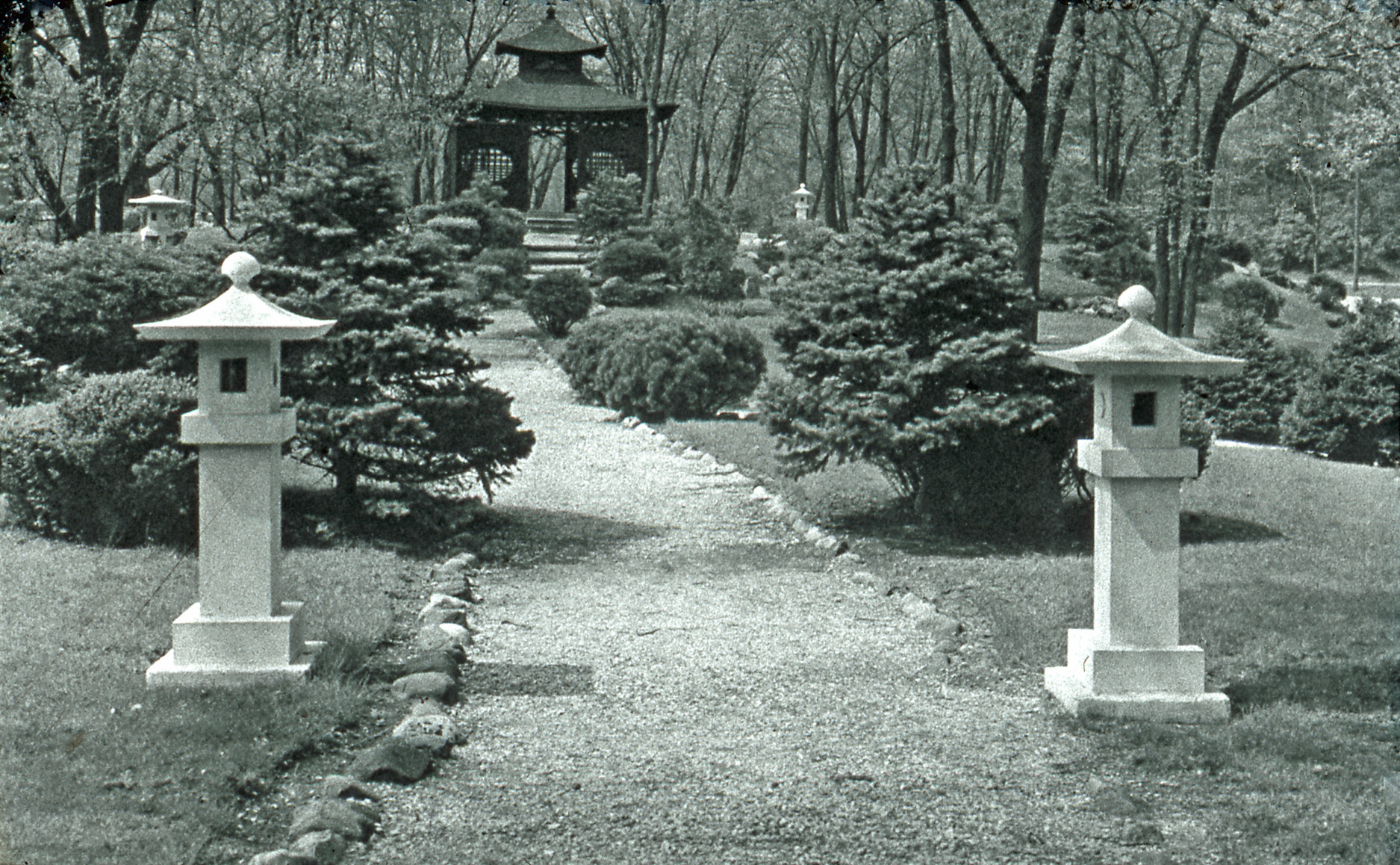
Japanese Garden at Laura Bradley Park in Peoria, IL, c.1920 (built around 1915)

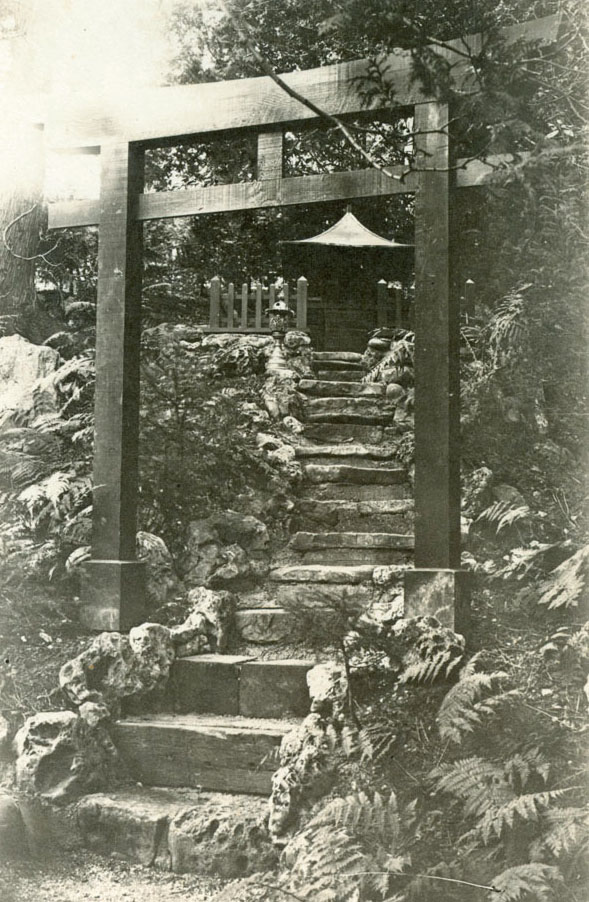
Japanese-style garden of Milton Tootle, Jr. in Mackinac Island, MI, c.1920 (built before 1910)

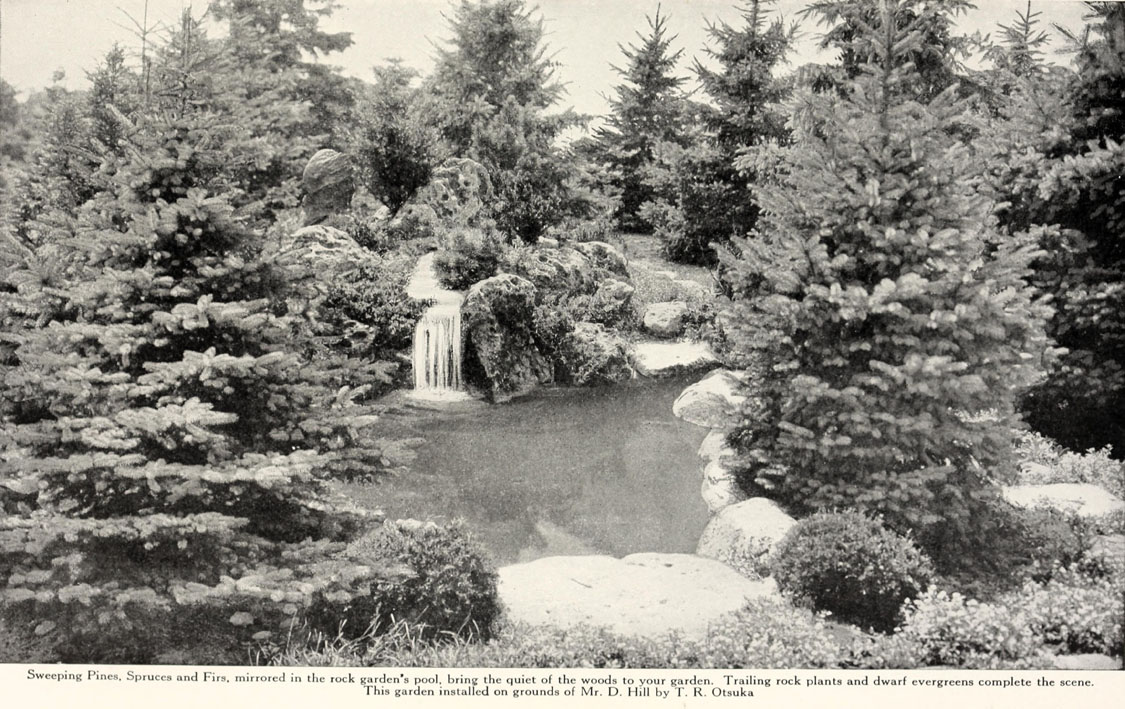
Rock garden pond of David Hill at D. Hill Nursery, Dundee, IL, c.1920

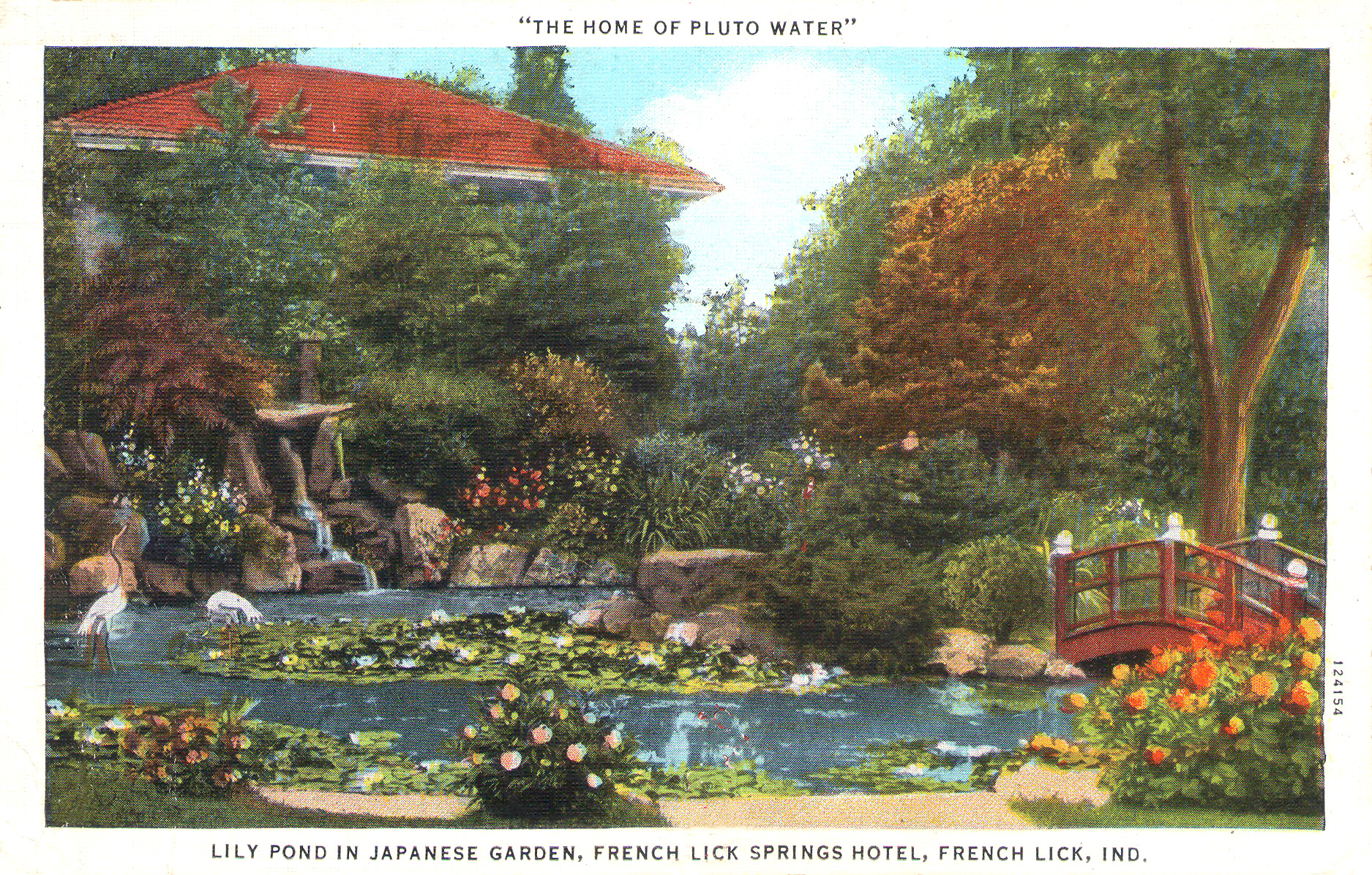
French Lick Springs Hotel Japanese garden, c.1925

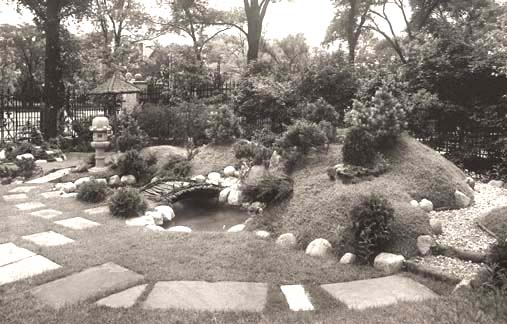
Japanese-style garden of Mrs. Edward Morris at 4800 S. Drexel Boulevard in Chicago, IL, c.1918 (built around 1915)

== Garden brochure, c.1919 ==
A single surviving photocopy of a five-fold brochure published by Ōtsuka around 1919 is the most important surviving record of his work. The brochure details Ōtsuka’s experience and the history and philosophy of Japanese gardens. A portrait of him is included, as well as small photos of nine private Japanese-style gardens and one public park garden (most of the gardens are confirmed to be his work through other sources):

1. Mr. Milton Tootle, Mackinac Island, Michigan
2. Mrs. George Fabyan, Geneva, Illinois
3. Mr. F. A. Seiberling, Akron, Ohio
4. Mr. Joy Morton, Lisle, Illinois
5. Mr. H. D. Higinbotham, Joliet, Illinois
6. Bradley Park, Peoria, Illinois
7. Mrs. Clarence LeBus, Lexington, Kentucky
8. Mrs. Edward Morris, Chicago, Illinois
9. Mr. E. L. King, Winona, Minnesota
10. Mrs. L. F. Swift, Lake Forest, Illinois

The brochure was published between 1916 and 1921, including the 300 South Michigan Avenue address, where Ōtsuka's garden business mailing address during that period. The Laura Bradley Park garden was built in 1918 and was pictured in the brochure. It was most likely printed around 1919 or at the end of World War I.

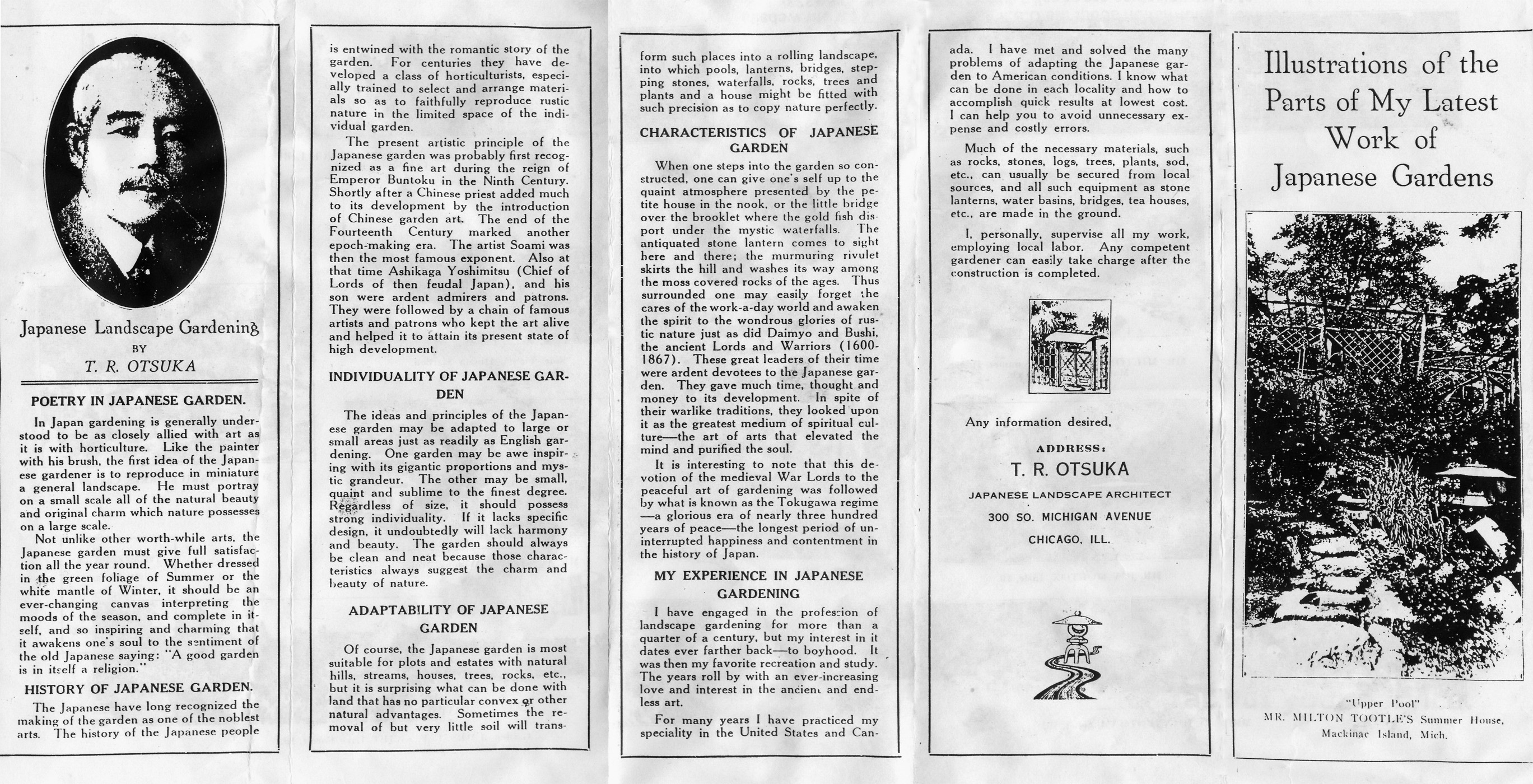
Text side of garden brochure published around 1919 by T. R. Ōtsuka

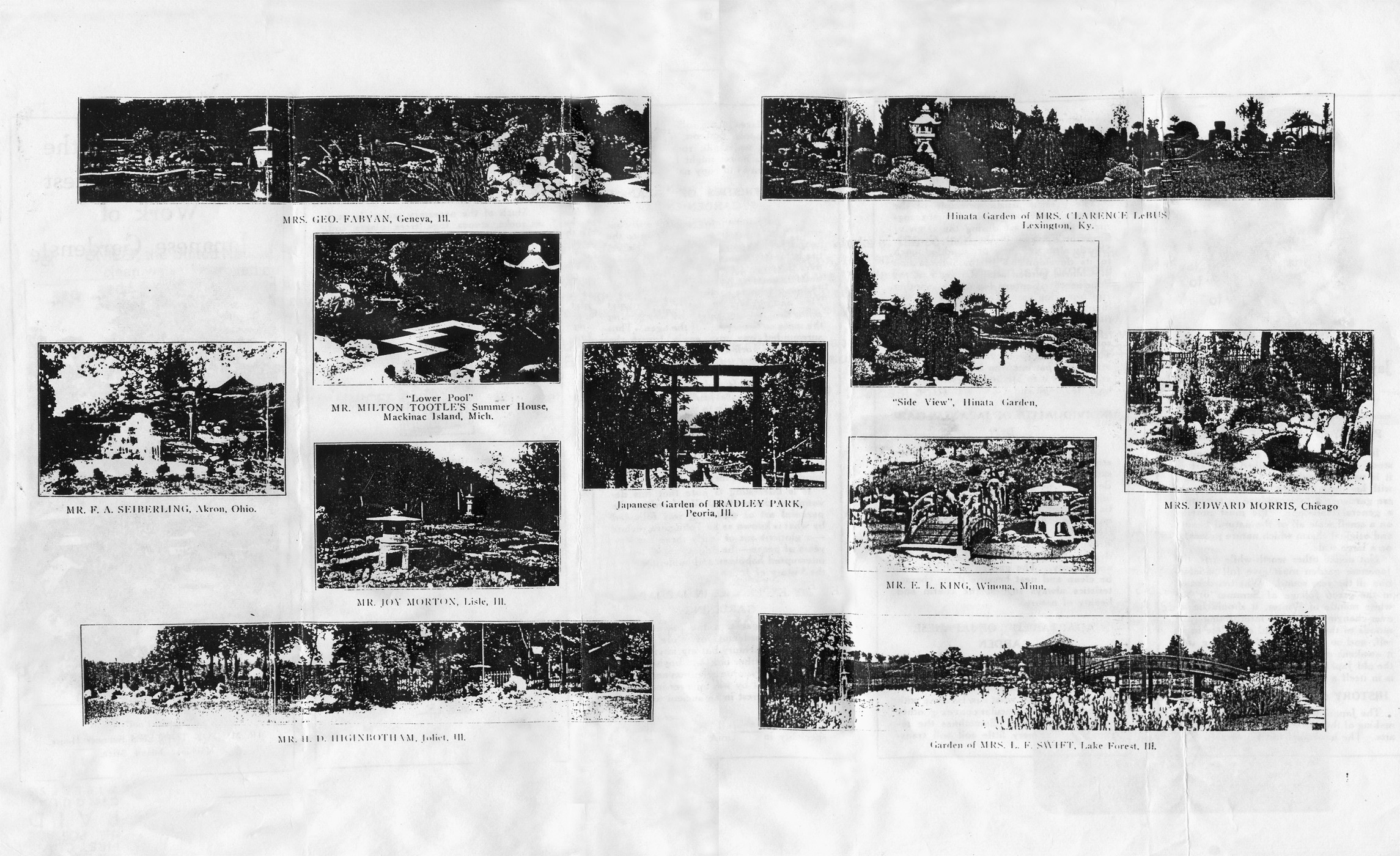
Image side of garden brochure published around 1919 by T. R. Ōtsuka
