= Miyako Ōtsuka =

Japanese basketball player

Personal information
- Nationality: Japanese
- Born: 21 February 1953 (age 72); Saga, Japan

Sport
- Sport: Basketball

Miyako Ōtsuka (大塚 宮子, Ōtsuka Miyako; born 21 February 1953) is a Japanese basketball player. She competed in the women's tournament at the 1976 Summer Olympics.
