= Kovalsky =

Kovalsky, feminine: Kovalskaya is a Russian surname, a Russification of Kowalski. Notable people with the surname include:

- Elena Kovalskaya, Russian theatre critic, curator, and teacher
- Leon Kovalsky (1940–2023), Russian politician
- Maksim Kovalsky (born 1993), Russian football player
- Vladislav Kovalsky (born 1947), Russian pianist
- Yelizaveta Kovalskaya (1851–1943), Russian revolutionary

== Fictional characters ==
- Kovalsky, main character of the video game Crime Scene Cleaner.

== See also ==
- Kowalski
