= Kowalski =

Kowalski (Polish pronunciation: [kɔˈvalskʲi]; feminine: Kowalska, plural: Kowalscy) is the second most common surname in Poland (140,471 people in 2009). In January 2026, the Polish register PESEL listed 67,308 women and 66,589 men with the surname. Kowalski surname is derived from the word kowal, meaning "[black]smith".

"Jan Kowalski" is used as a placeholder name in Poland.

== Notable people ==
- Alexander Kowalski (1902–1940), Polish ice hockey player killed in the Katyn massacre
- Aleksander Kowalski (1930–2009), Polish Nordic combined skier
- Alexander Kowalski (musician) (born 1978), German DJ, electronic music artist
- Alfred Kowalski (1849–1915), Polish painter
- Annette Kowalski (born 1936), American producer, business partner of Bob Ross
- Bernard Louis Kowalski (1929–2007), American director
- Bronisława Kowalska (1955–2020), Polish politician
- Chana Kowalska (1899–1942), Polish Jewish painter and journalist
- Craig Kowalski (born 1981), American ice hockey player
- Daniel Kowalski (born 1975), Australian Olympic swimmer
- Faustyna Kowalska (1905–1938), Polish Catholic saint, nun and mystic
- Frank Kowalski (1907–1974), American US Army soldier and United States Representative
- Gary A. Kowalski (born 1953), American author
- Gerry Kowalsky (1922–2026), Canadian car salesman
- Grzegorz Kowalski (disambiguation)
- Henryk Kowalski (1911–1982), Polish violinist and composer
- Henryk Kowalski (1933–2021), Polish cyclist
- James Kowalski (born 1954), United States Air Force Lieutenant General, Commander of Air Force Global Strike Command Barksdale AFB
- Janusz Kowalski (cyclist) (born 1952), Polish cyclist
- Jerzy Kowalski (disambiguation)
- Jochen Kowalski (born 1954), German singer
- John Kowalski (born c. 1951), American soccer coach
- Józef Kowalski (1900–2013), Polish supercentenarian and second-to-last Polish-Soviet war veteran
- Józef Kowalski (1911–1942), Polish Roman Catholic priest killed at Auschwitz, beatified
- Józef Wierusz-Kowalski (1866–1927), Polish physicist and diplomat
- Kasia Kowalska (born 1973), Polish pop rock singer and songwriter
- Katarzyna Kowalska (born 1985), Polish long distance runner
- Kazimierz Kowalski, Polish singer
- Ken Kowalski (born 1945), Canadian politician
- Kerstin Kowalski (born 1976), German rower
- Ludwik Kowalski (born 1931), Polish-American nuclear physicist and professor emeritus
- Łukasz Kowalski, Polish footballer
- Manja Kowalski (born 1976), German rower
- Lech Kowalski (born 1951), American film director
- Marek Daniel Kowalski (born 1966), medievalist
- Maria Kowalska, Polish alpine skier
- Marian Albertovich Kowalski (1821–1884), Polish astronomer
- Myron Kowalsky (1941–2022), Canadian politician
- Natalia Kowalska (born 1989), Polish racing driver
- Natalia Kowalska (1918–unknown), Polish chess master
- Piotr Kowalski (1927–2004), French-Polish artist
- Richard Kowalski (born 1963), American astronomer
- Robert Kowalski (born 1941), British logician
- Sharon Kowalski, subject of groundbreaking disability and LGBT legal rights case
- Tadeusz Kowalski (1889–1948), Polish orientalist, expert on Middle East Muslim culture and languages
- Thomas Schmidt-Kowalski (1949–2013), German composer
- Wacław Kowalski, Polish actor
- William Kowalski (born 1970), American author
- Wladek Kowalski (AKA "Killer" Kowalski) (1926–2008), Polish-Canadian professional wrestler, trainer
- Władysław Kowalski (politician) (1894–1958), Polish trade union activist, writer and politician (PSL, ZSL)
- Włodzimierz Tadeusz Kowalski (1934–1990), historian and screenwriter
- Zbigniew Kowalski (1924–1992), Polish mathematician
- Zbigniew S. Kowalski (born 1949), Polish mathematician
- Yelizaveta Kovalskaya (1851–1943), Russian revolutionary
- Stanisław Kowalski (1910–2022), Polish supercentenarian masters athlete.

== Fictional characters ==
- Kowalski, character in the 1991 parody film Hot Shots!, played by Kristy Swanson
- Kowalski, main character in the 1971 film Vanishing Point, played by Barry Newman
- Kowalski, character in the PlayStation 2 game Syphon Filter 2
- Kowalski, character in Madagascar and the TV series The Penguins of Madagascar
- Mr Kowalski, original owner of Kowalski's, Rosie Duncan's florist store in the novel Fairytale of New York
- Mrs. Kowalski, Miriam Margolyes' character in the film How to Lose Friends & Alienate People (2008)
- Kowalski, supporting character in The Ren & Stimpy Show
- Benjamin "Ben" Kowalski in the comic series Templar, Arizona
- Major Charles Kawalsky, a character in the science fiction movie Stargate and subsequent television series Stargate SG-1
- Dick Kowalsky, character in the French animated series Funky Cops (2003)
- Felix Kawalski, character in the British television series EastEnders
- Jacob Kowalski, Dan Fogler's character in the film Fantastic Beasts and Where to Find Them (2016)
- Joe Kowalski, character in SIGMA Force book series by author James Rollins
- Kitty Kowalski, Lex Luthor's companion in 2006 film Superman Returns, played by Parker Posey
- Leon Kowalski, character in the 1982 film Blade Runner played by Brion James
- Matt Kowalsky, George Clooney's character in the movie Gravity
- Peter "Petey" Kowalski in the video game Bully
- Private Kowalski, character in the video game Fallout: New Vegas
- Roch Kowalski, character in Sienkiewicz's novel With Fire and Sword
- Roxanne Kowalski, Daryl Hannah's character in Roxanne, the 1987 remake of Cyrano de Bergerac with Steve Martin
- Seaman Kowalski, crewman assigned aboard the submarine SSRN Seaview, on the 1964–68 TV series Voyage to the Bottom of the Sea, played by Del Monroe
- Sergei Kowalski, the titular character in the Spaghetti Western The Mercenary, played by Franco Nero.
- Sgt. Kowalski, character in Raising Arizona
- Sgt. Kowalski, character in video game Call of Duty 3
- Sophie Kowalski, Marion Cotillard's character in the 2005 French film Jeux d'Enfants, also known by its English title, Love Me If You Dare
- Stanley and Stella Kowalski, characters in the Pulitzer Prize–winning play by Tennessee Williams and 1951 film, A Streetcar Named Desire
- Detective Stanley Kowalski, character in the 1994–1999 television series Due South (named after the above Streetcar character)
- Steve Kowalski, character in the 2007 film Devil's Diary
- Viktor Kowalski, member of the OAS in The Day of the Jackal by Frederick Forsyth
- Walt Kowalski, protagonist of the 2008 film Gran Torino played by Clint Eastwood
- Meryl Lee Kowalski, character in the Gary D. Schmidt book The Wednesday Wars

== See also ==
- Kovalsky

== Other uses ==
- Kowalski's Markets, supermarket chain
- Baranomys kowalskii
