= List of nonfiction books about homosexuality =

This is a list of nonfiction books about homosexuality ordered by author last name. Books are included on this list based on notability quantified by numbers of citations in other publications (as confirmed by Google Scholar). Books not specifically about homosexuality, with no ISBN or no citations will be removed.

Homosexuality is romantic or sexual attraction or behavior among members of the same sex, situationally or in an enduring disposition. This is distinct from self identification of being gay, lesbian or bisexual.

== Books by author ==
=== A–D ===
- Sidney Abbott; Barbara Love (1972), "Is Women's Liberation a Lesbian Plot?", Woman in Sexist Society: Studies in Power and Powerlessness, New American Library, ISBN 978-0-465-09199-7
- Sidney Abbott; Barbara Love (1977), Sappho was a Right-on Woman: A Liberated View of Lesbianism, Stein and Day, ISBN 978-0-8128-2406-3
- Adam, Barry (1987). The Rise of a Gay and Lesbian Movement, G. K. Hall & Co. ISBN 0-8057-9714-9
- Bagemihl, Bruce (1999), Biological Exuberance: Animal Homosexuality and Natural Diversity, St. Martin's Press, ISBN 0-312-19239-8
- Elizabeth Bernstein, Laurie Schaffner (2005), Regulating sex: the politics of intimacy and identity, Routledge, ISBN 0-415-94869-X
- Bérubé, Allan, Coming out under Fire: The History of Gay Men and Women in World War Two, New York: MacMillan 1990, ISBN 0-02-903100-1
- Boswell, John (1980), Christianity, Social Tolerance, and Homosexuality: Gay People in Western Europe from the Beginning of the Christian Era to the Fourteenth Century, University of Chicago Press, ISBN 978-0-226-06711-7
- Bray, Alan (1995), Homosexuality in Renaissance England, Columbia University Press, ISBN 0-231-10289-5
- Brown, Lester G., Two Spirit People, 1997, Harrington Park Press, ISBN 1-56023-089-4
- Bullough et al. (eds.) (1996). Handbook of Medieval Sexuality. Garland Publishing, ISBN 0-8153-1287-3
- Bullough, Vern L. (2002), Before Stonewall: Activists for Gay and Lesbian Rights in Historical Context, Harrington Park Press, ISBN 1-56023-193-9
- Chauncey, George (1994), Gay New York: Gender, Urban Culture, and the Making of the Gay Male World, 1890–1940, New York: Basic Books, ISBN 0-465-02621-4
- Chepstow-Lusty, Lill-Ann; Ullstein Moseng, Bera; Angeltvedt, Rolf Martin (2008), Gay Kids, Abstrakt forlag, ISBN 978-82-7935-262-4
- Davidson, James (2007), The Greeks And Greek Love: A Radical Reappraisal of Homosexuality In Ancient Greece, Weidenfeld & Nicolson, ISBN 978-0-297-81997-4
- Delany, Samuel R. (2001) [1999], Times Square Red, Times Square Blue (Paperback ed.), New York, New York: New York University Press, ISBN 0-8147-1919-8
- Dover, Kenneth J., Greek Homosexuality, Gerald Duckworth & Co. Ltd. 1979, ISBN 0-674-36261-6 (hardcover), ISBN 0-674-36270-5 (paperback)
- Dynes, Wayne R., ed. (1990), The Encyclopedia of Homosexuality, Garland Publishing, ISBN 0-8240-6544-1

=== E–G ===
- d'Emilio, John, Sexual Politics, Sexual Communities: The Making of a Homosexual Minority in the United States, 1940–1970, University of Chicago Press 1983, ISBN 0-226-14265-5
- Faderman, Lillian, Odd Girls and Twilight Lovers: A History of Lesbian Life in Twentieth Century America, Penguin 1992
- Gunther, Scott, The Elastic Closet: A History of Homosexuality in France, 1942–present Book about the history of homosexual movements in France (sample chapter available online). Palgrave-Macmillan, 2009. ISBN 0-230-22105-X.

=== H–P ===
- Hinsch, Bret, Passions of the Cut Sleeve: The Male Homosexual Tradition in China, The University of California Press, 1990, ISBN 0-520-06720-7
- Hitzlsperger, Thomas (2024), Mutproben, Kiepenheuer & Witsch, ISBN 978-346-200-528-8
- Johansson, Warren; Percy, William A. (1993), Outing : shattering the conspiracy of silence, Haworth Press, ISBN 978-1-56023-041-0
- Johnson, David K. (2004), The lavender scare : the Cold War persecution of gays and lesbians in the federal government, University of Chicago Press, ISBN 978-0-226-40481-3
- Lazar, Moshe; Lacy, Norris J. (1989), "The care and feeding of gazelles - Medieval Arabic and Hebrew love poetry; Roth, Norman", Poetics of love in the Middle Ages : texts and contexts, George Mason University Press, ISBN 978-0-913969-25-0, OCLC 19123544
- Kowalski J. A. (2015). The origins of homosexuality emancipation. Opole, Poland: The Institute of Sex Research Press. an Amazon Kindle edition, ISBN 978-83-931776-3-9.
- LeVay S. (1996). Queer Science: The Use and Abuse of Research into Homosexuality. Cambridge: MIT Press. ISBN 0-262-12199-9
- LeVay S. (2011). Gay, Straight, and the Reason Why: The Science of Sexual Orientation. New York: Oxford University Press. ISBN 0-19-973767-3
- Michael, Robert T., John H. Gagnon, Edward O. Laumann, and Gina Kolata. Sex in America: A definitive survey. Boston: Little, Brown, 1995. ISBN 0-316-07524-8
- Myers, JoAnne (2003), Historical dictionary of the lesbian liberation movement : still the rage, Scarecrow Press, ISBN 978-0-8108-4506-0, OCLC 51305982
- Percy, William A. (1996), Pederasty and pedagogy in archaic Greece, University of Illinois Press, ISBN 978-0-252-02209-8

=== Q–S ===
- Ramos, Juanita (1994), Compañeras : Latina lesbians : an anthology, Routledge, ISBN 978-0-415-90925-9, OCLC 29877318
- Rocke, Michael (1998), Forbidden Friendships: Homosexuality and Male Culture in Renaissance Florence, Oxford University Press, ISBN 9780195122923
- Rousseau, G. S. (1991), Perilous enlightenment : pre- and post-modern discourses : sexual, historical, Manchester, UK, ISBN 978-0-7190-3301-8, OCLC 26094703
- Schmitt, Arno; Sofer, Jehoeda (1991), Sexuality and eroticism among males in Moslem societies, Harrington Park Press, ISBN 978-0-918393-91-3, OCLC 151327448
- Sullivan, Andrew. VIRTUALLY NORMAL An Argument About Homosexuality 209 pages. Alfred A. Knopf.1995
- Queeristan (2020) by Parmesh Shahani

=== T–Z ===
- Tamagne, Florence. A History of Homosexuality in Europe Vol. I & II, Berlin, London, Paris 1919–1939. New York: Algora Publishing, 2004. ISBN 978-0-87586-355-9
- Terry, Jennifer (1999), An American obsession : science, medicine, and homosexuality in modern society, University of Chicago Press, ISBN 978-0-226-79367-2, OCLC 40996056
- Vanita, Ruth (2001), Queering India : same-sex love and eroticism in Indian culture and society, Routledge, ISBN 978-0-415-92950-9, OCLC 48109202

== See also ==
- Homosexuality
- List of LGBT periodicals
- LGBT literature
- List of lesbian fiction
