= True Pole (disambiguation) =

True Pole is a stereotypical ideal Polish person.

True Pole may also refer to:

- True North Pole
- True South Pole
