= R. A. Kowalski =

R. A. Kowalski may refer to:

- Richard Kowalski (born 1963), astronomer
- Robert Kowalski (born 1941), logician and computer scientist

== See also ==
- Kowalski, a Polish surname
