= Jerzy Kowalski =

Jerzy Kowalski may refer to:

- Jerzy Kowalski (athlete), Polish sprinter
- Jerzy Kowalski (rower), Polish rower
- Jerzy Adam Kowalski, Polish researcher and popular science author
