= Jan Kowalski (placeholder name) =

Polish placeholder name

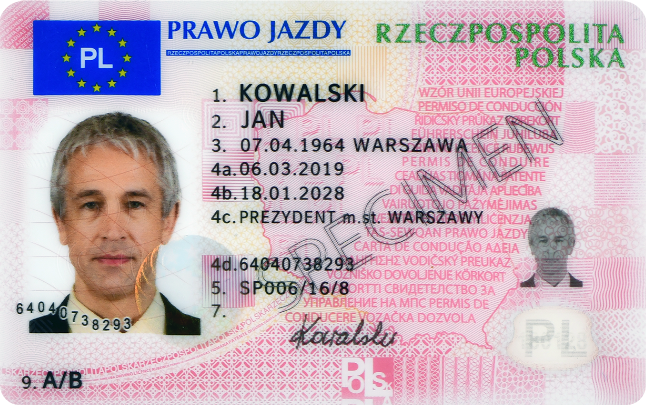
A specimen of Polish driving licence bearing the name of Jan Kowalski.

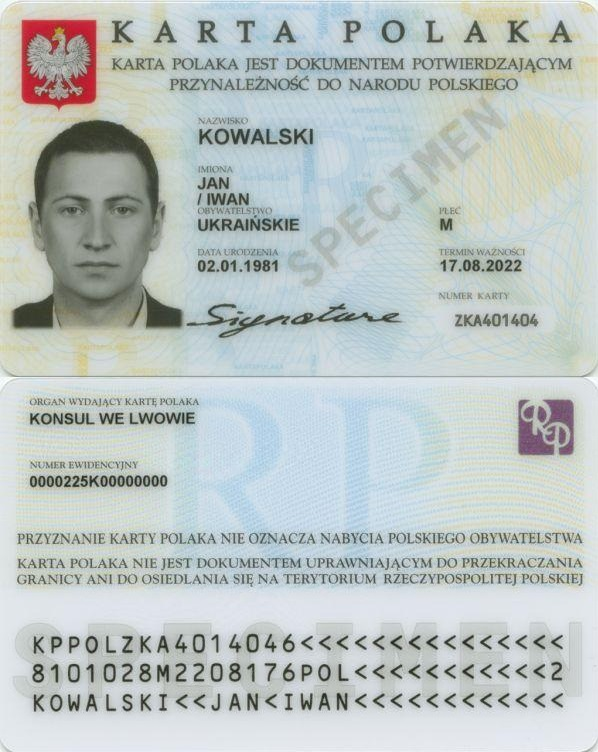
A specimen of Karta Polaka bearing the name of Jan Kowalski.

In Polish culture, Jan Kowalski is a placeholder name for an average Polish person, the usage being similar to "John Smith" or "John Doe" in some English speaking cultures.

The surname Kowalski/Kowalska is the second most common surname in Poland (140,471 people in 2009), with the leader being Nowak (207,348 in 2009).

The name is close to John Smith, both in translation and in the metonymic meaning of averageness, although a more literal translation would be "John Smithson", as -ski is a patronymic suffix in Polish-language surnames. Analogous names in other languages include Jean Lefèvre, Giovanni Ferrari, Ivan Kuznetsov, Sean McGowan, Hans Schmidt, Kovács János, etc.

== Stereotypes associated with the name ==
"Kowalski" itself is a stereotypical Polish surname, despite being nearly half as common as the leader, Nowak. Polish philologist Mariusz Rutkowski explains this phenomenon by the additional fact of the high productivity of the surname's structure: the patronymic suffix -ski produces over 7,800 Polish surnames, with the runner-up being the suffix icz/ycz (about 1680 surnames).

Due to its commonality, the surname "Kowalski" acquired some other connotations, which may be grouped into two classes, with close meanings: "average, typical/stereotypical dweller of Poland" and "ordinary, mundane person". (Note: The Polish-language source groups these synonyms with overlapping meanings as follows: "przeciętny, zwyczajny mieszkaniec Polski" and "zwykły człowiek, szary człowiek".) It is often difficult to classify a specific metonymic usage of the surname Kowalski, because the first class is hyponymic with respect to the second one, i.e., an average person is also an ordinary one.

The metonymic reference is not restricted to Polish average persons: One may see the expressions such as "Kowalskis of Albania", "German Jan Kowalski", etc.

A major difference between the two classes may be demonstrated by the following examples: "An average Kowalski who uses the internet for purchases is in the age range of 31 to 40 years". Here "average/ordinary" is used in the statistical sense, referring to the traits of the majority of people. Compare it with "The monthly salary of a member of sejm is 9,526.90zl; an ordinary Kowalski can only dream about such earnings". Here "ordinary/average" is used as a contrast with respect to the privileged elites. Close to the latter case is the situation when the name "Kowalski" is contrasted with a celebrity surname, such as Tusk. In this context the surname Kowalski" acquires the meaning "unknown, anonymous person". An example would be a newspaper article title "Poseł Rokita, premier Buzek i Jan Kowalski" [MP Rokita, Prime Minister Buzek and Jan Kowalski]

Yet another meaning is to use the surname "Kowalski" to refer to an unspecified, but specific, concrete person from a crowd: "We started the activities of our insurance company with offering our products to a Kowalski, i.e. to an individual client".

In broader, especially international contexts, "Kowalski" signifies the Polishness of the average person in question: "The average Kowalski spends 10.6 hours a week online (7th place in the world)".

Some linguists suggest that the common expression "przysłowiowy Kowalski" ["the proverbial Kowalski"] has a metalinguistic character. However, the analysis of the corpus of media texts based on the National Corpus of the Polish Language (NCPL) carried out by Rutkowski did not uncover any additional function beyond the mentioned ones.

Rutkowski's analysis of the corpus confirmed the uniqueness of the surname "Kowalski" in Polish language with respect to the mentioned connotations. In particular, the surname Nowak was used with a similar meaning only once. However, in some cases "Kowalski" was grouped with some other surnames, such as Nowak, Malinowski, or Wiśniewski, which would signify a broader representation of Poland: "Imagine our neighbors, the Kowalskis or Nowaks, who earn PLN 100 less per month than we do".

Rutkowski summarizes that overall, the figure of Kowalski has the function of similarity and representativeness. This function also implies the exclusion of the elites or "non-Kovalskis", as non-representative. At the same time, a Kovalski is stripped of individuality and represents a kind of collective identity.

== See also ==
- True Pole, a stereotypical Pole
- Everyman, a stock character of an ordinary and humble type
- Jan Kowalski (band), Polish musical band of 1980s
