= Grzegorz Kowalski =

Grzegorz Kowalski may refer to:

- Grzegorz Kowalski (artist) (born 1942), Polish sculptor, designer of interior decoration
- Grzegorz Kowalski (footballer, born 1963)
- Grzegorz Kowalski (footballer, born 1977)
