= Matka Polka =

National personification of the Polish nation

Matka Polka (lit. 'Mother Pole'; common transl. Polish Mother) is a cultural stereotype, often described as a national myth, of a woman who dedicated her whole life to care for her children and upbring them in the spirit of patriotic and traditional values. The term and concept originated in the 1830 poem Do Matki Polki by Adam Mickiewicz. In 20th and 21st centuries the concept has been criticized for its conservatism and patriarchy.

The major Polish center obstetrics and neonatology, gynecology, and pediatrics is called Polish Mother's Health Center (Centrum Zdrowia Matki Polki).

== Gallery ==
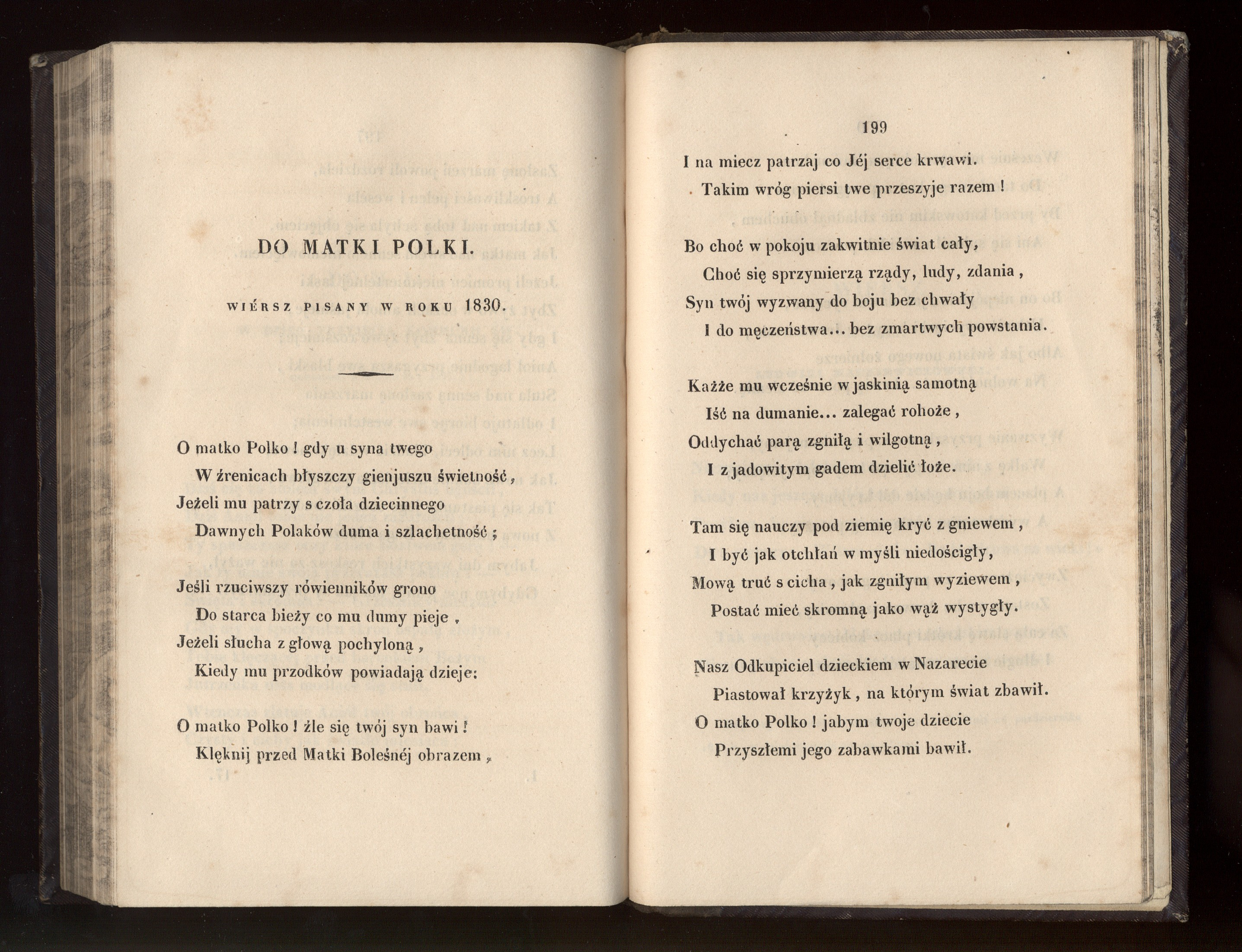
Do Matki Polki

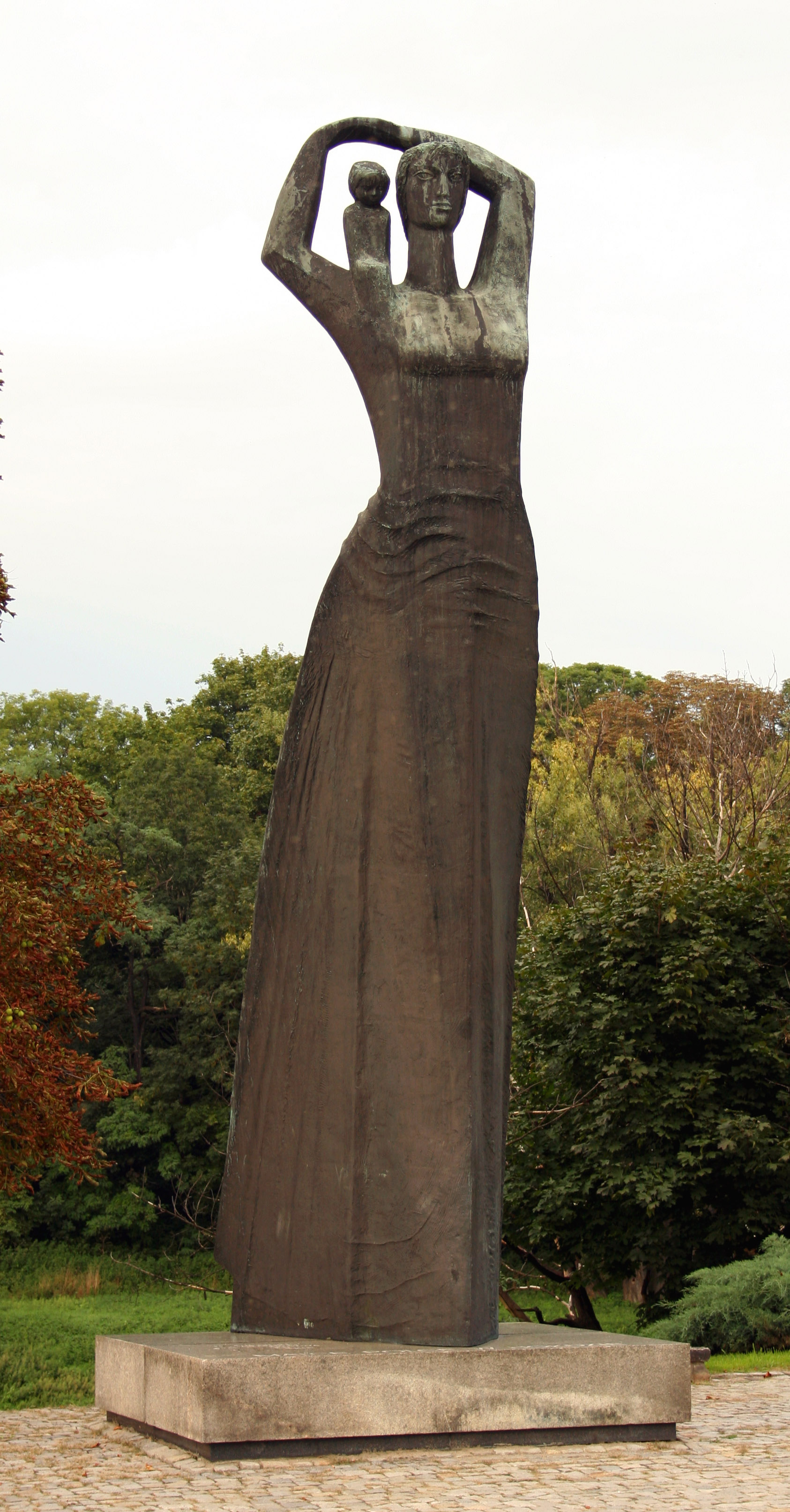
Monument to Matka Polka in Racibórz

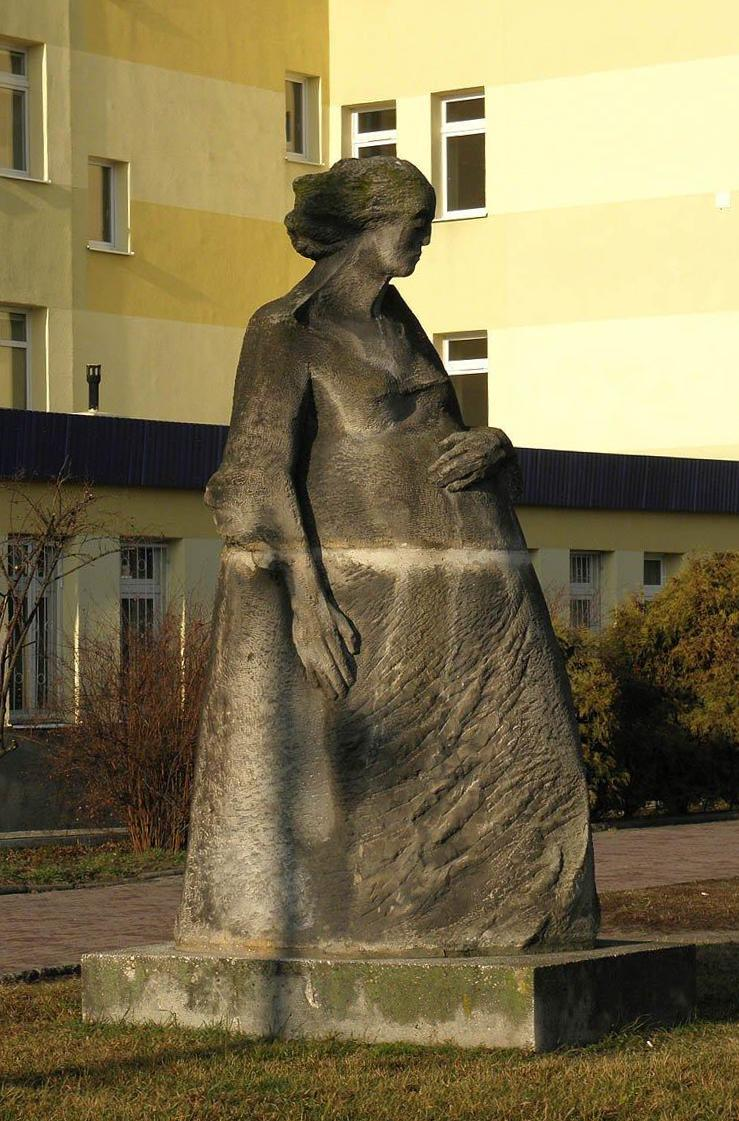
Monument to Matka Polka in Radom

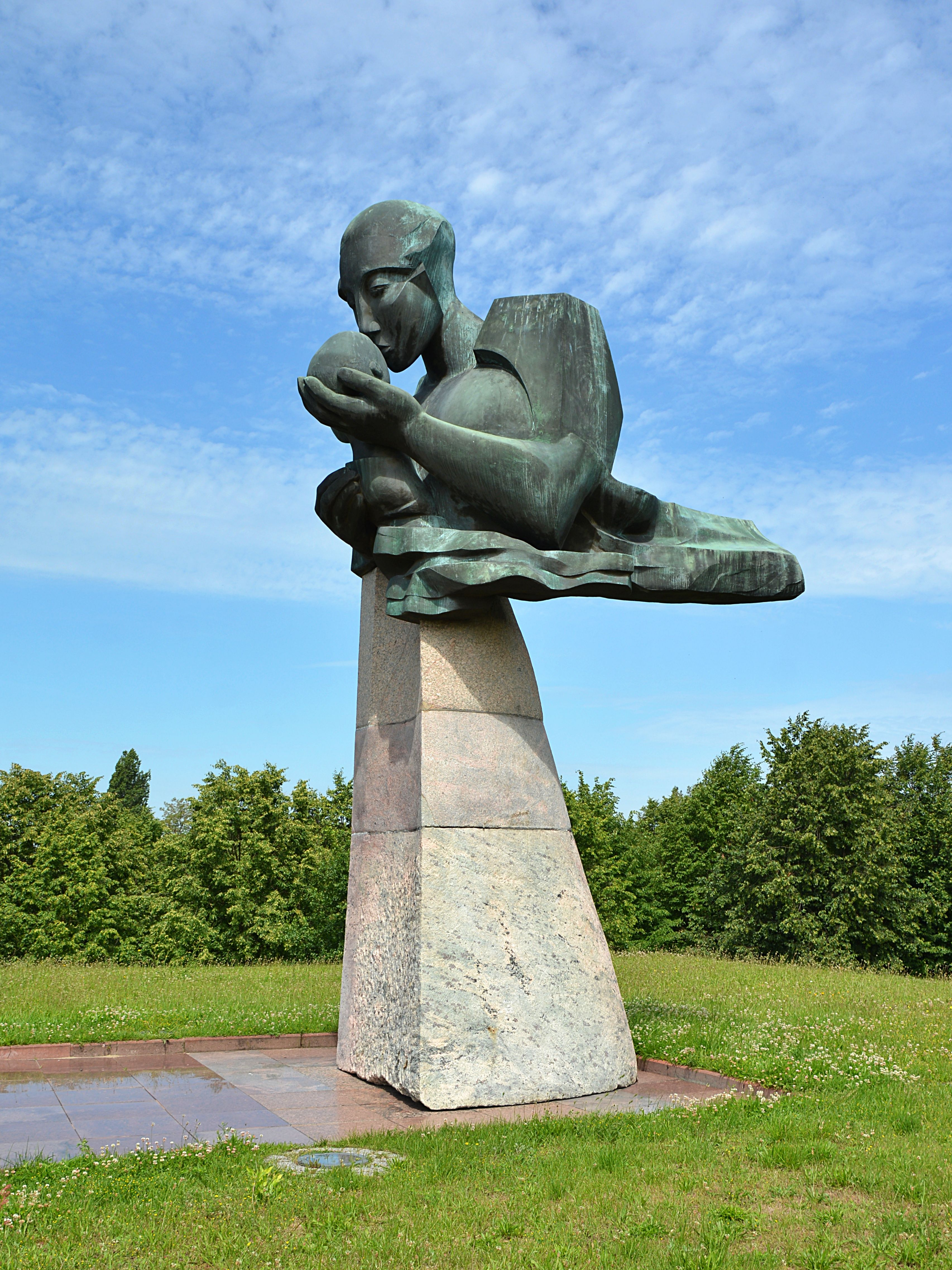
"Motherhood" a.k.a. Matka Polka, Łódź

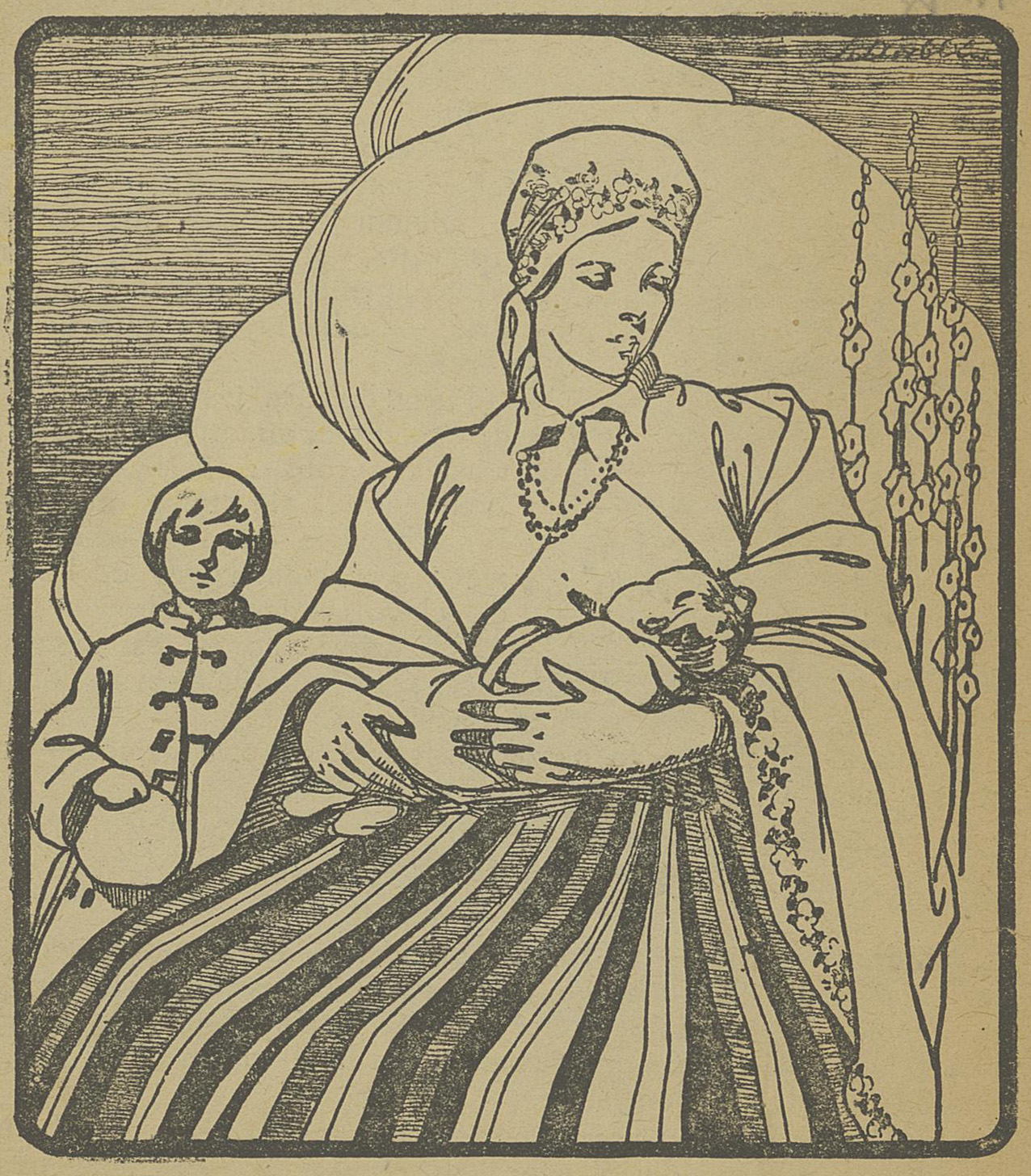
For Polish Mothers, a publication, 1925

== See also ==
- Familialism
- Kinder, Küche, Kirche
- True Pole
