= Maksim Kovalsky =

Russian footballer

Maksim Kovalskiy
Personal information
- Full name: Maksim Andreyevich Kovalskiy
- Date of birth: 6 February 1993 (age 33)
- Place of birth: Saint Petersburg, Russia
- Height: 1.70 m (5 ft 7 in)
- Position: Defender

Senior career*
Years	Team	Apps	(Gls)
2010–2012	PFC Spartak Nalchik	0	(0)
2013	FC Rus Saint Petersburg	20	(0)
2014–2015	FC Taganrog	26	(0)
2015–2016	FC Kubanskaya Korona Shevchenko		
- * Club domestic league appearances and goals

Maksim Andreyevich Kovalskiy (Russian: Максим Андреевич Ковальский; born 6 February 1993) is a former Russian football defender.

== Club career ==
He made his debut for PFC Spartak Nalchik on 17 July 2011 in a Russian Cup game against FC Torpedo Vladimir.

Kovalskiy made his debut in the Russian Second Division for FC Rus Saint Petersburg on 20 April 2013 in a game against FC Lokomotiv-2 Moscow.
