= Vladislav Kovalsky =

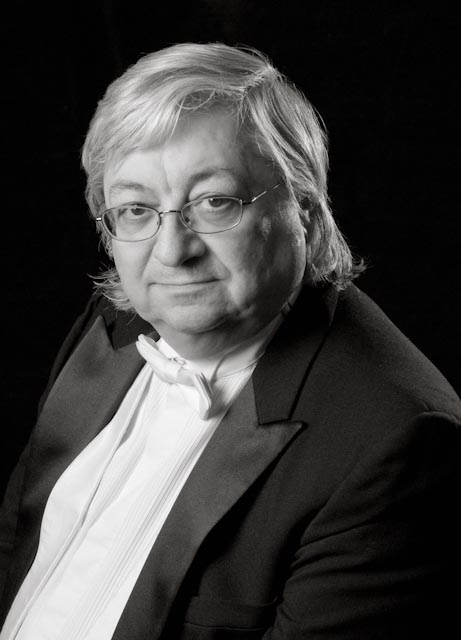
Vladislav Kovalsky

Vladislav Kovalsky (born July 12, 1947 in Khabarovsk, Russia) is a Russian pianist and Executive and Artistic Director of the Monmouth Conservatory of Music.

Kovalsky pursued his graduate studies at the Nikolai Rimsky-Korsakov Leningrad State Conservatory of Music. His teacher there was Nathan Perlman.

His performance experiences as a concert pianist, collaborative artist, includes tours of Russia, United States, Canada, Korea, and Japan. In addition, Kovalsky lectures, teaching at Georgian Court University, Lakewood, New Jersey. He is a Steinway artist.
