= Grzegorz Kowalski (footballer, born 1977) =

Polish footballer

Personal information
- Date of birth: 15 December 1977 (age 48)
- Place of birth: Zabrze, Poland
- Height: 1.82 m (6 ft 0 in)
- Position: Defender

Senior career*
Years	Team	Apps	(Gls)
1996	Górnik Katowice		
1996–1997	Sośnica Gliwice		
1998	Carbo Gliwice		
1998	Sośnica Gliwice		
1999–2001	Carbo Gliwice		
2001–2004	Ruch Radzionków		
2004	Walka Makoszowy		
2004–2005	Kültürspor Datteln		
2005–2007	Źródło Kromołów		
2007–2008	Naprzod Syrynia		
2009–2013	Przyszłość Ciochowice		
2013–2018	Sokół Łany Wielkie		
2019	Carbo Gliwice	6	(1)
- * Club domestic league appearances and goals

Grzegorz Kowalski (born 15 December 1977) is a Polish former professional footballer who played as a defender.

== Honours ==
Sokół Łany Wielkie

- Klasa A Zabrze: 2015–16
