= True Pole =

Stereotype

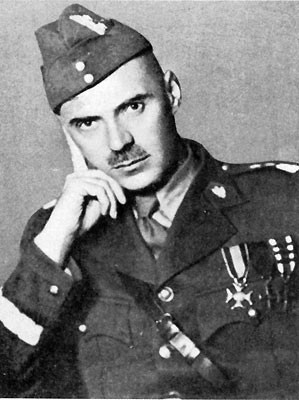
Władysław Anders was not a "True Pole" for some Polish nationalists.

In Polish culture, the True Pole (Polish: prawdziwy Polak, plural: Polish: prawdziwi Polacy) is a stereotype of an ideal Polish person. This stereotype is closely associated with Polish Catholicism. The "true Pole" expression is often invoked in Polish right-wing and nationalist rhetoric.

== Catholicism ==
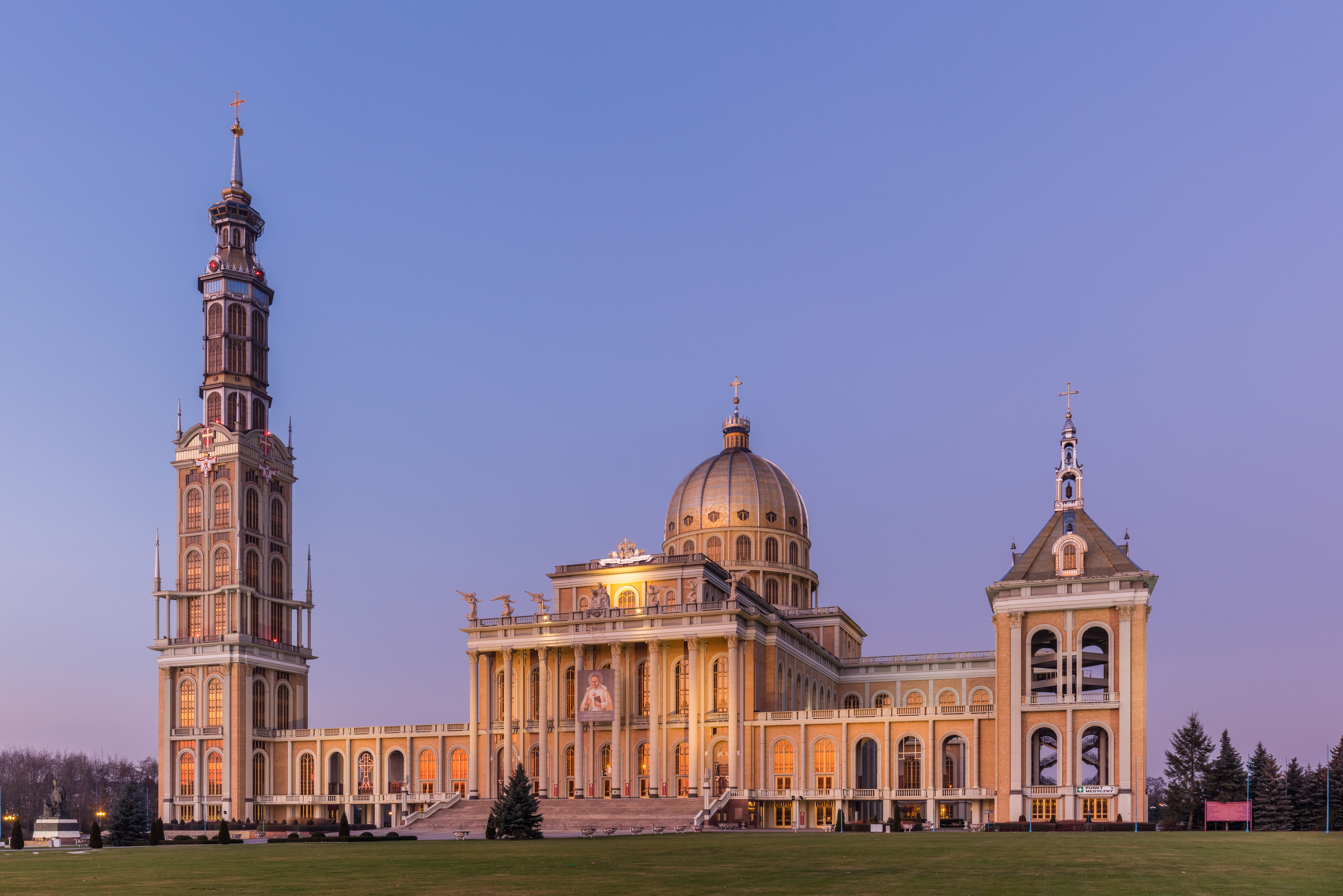
The Basilica of Our Lady of Licheń, the largest church in Poland

A particular trait of "True Poles" is their adherence to Roman Catholicism. As a popular saying, among several versions, goes, "prawdziwy Polak to katolik" ("a true Pole is a Catholic"). In particular, Catholicism was the criterion used by Polish officials to identify persons as Poles among the rural population of Western Belarus and Western Ukraine ("Eastern Borderlands" of Poland) who did not have an ethnic self-identification and referred to themselves as "tutejszy". While this criterion was important for maintaining the national identity during the times of the Partitions of Poland by the non-Catholic powers, it was detrimental to the integration of Eastern Borderlands during the times of the independent Second Polish Republic.

The transition from the religious tolerance of Rzecz Pospolita to the monoreligious attitude and the identification of "Polishness" with Catholicism started in the second half of 17th century, under the influence of wars with non-Catholic neighbors: Islamic Turkey, Lutheran Sweden and Eastern Orthodox Russia and Cossacks. Gradually the discrimination against religious dissidents increased. Eventually the Constitution of 3 May of 1791 declared Catholicism the state religion while granting religious freedom to dissidents.

Professor Brian Porter–Szűcs asserts that the inseparable association of Poles and Catholicism as it is known today was finalized by the very end of the 19th century, and he links this with the emergence of the hyphenated term "Polak-katolik" ("Pole-Catholic"), unusual for Polish orthography. He stated that until then the expressions like "Polish therefore Catholic" ("Polak więc katolik") were usually mere demographic statements, and only at the beginning of the 20th century, they came to mean the declaration that the only proper Pole ought to be a Catholic.

This criterion has routinely been used by Polish nationalists with their motto "Poland for the Poles". A notable incident was with Polish General Władysław Anders, who was of Baltic German Protestant origin. After World War II he was a member of the Polish government-in-exile in London and was repeatedly accused by nationalists for being "not a Pole", so that he had to go to courts and successfully sue them for libel.

== Modern Poland ==
The "true Pole" stereotype is still strong in politics of modern, post-Communist Poland, particularly within right-wing and nationalist circles.

Prof. Mikołaj Cześnik asserts that people who are using this kind of language are usually usurping the right to be the representatives of "true Polishness", while their opponents are the traitors of the Polishness.

Witold Starzewski wrote in Przegląd:

There is a large group in Polish society who believe that only they are entitled to the definition of "Pole". All the others are "pretend Poles", who either are poisoned by hostile propaganda or are servants (agents) of Russia and Germany, always hostile to us, and of course of the Jews and masons. A true Pole is a faithful listener of Radio Maryja and a reader of Gazeta Polska. He will not touch Gazeta Wyborcza and only tolerates Rzeczpospolita with difficulty.

He is convinced that Poles are a noble nation, unlucky only because of their neighbors, who are their eternal enemies, and because of the wickedness of allies who always treacherously abandon us in times of need.

Michał Nogaś wrote in Gazeta Wyborcza that the numbers of the "non-true Poles" is steadily growing. Below is a small sample from the list assembled by Nogaś: people who do not vote for Law and Justice, non-heteronormative people, defenders of the Białowieża Forest and other green areas, opponents of the Vistula Spit canal, opponents of the total appropriation of public media by the authorities, cyclists, (Note: In this context "cyclists" is a hint to the slur "pedał" towards gay men, which literally means "bicycle pedal".) vegetarians and vegans, atheists, ...

== See also ==
- Jan Kowalski (Average Joe)
- No true Scotsman
- Real Programmer
- Matka Polka
