= Ludwik Kowalski =

- Born: 1931 (age 94–95); Poland
- Education: Warsaw University of Technology, Curie Institute, Warsaw
- Occupations: scientist, professor

Ludwik Kowalski (born 1931) is a Polish-American physicist, anti-communist author, and professor emeritus of Montclair State University in Montclair, New Jersey.

== Life ==
Kowalski was born in Poland. His parents, members of the Polish Communist Party (the precursor of Polish United Workers' Party), decided to emigrate to the Soviet Union in 1932. In Moscow, they continued in their careers as an engineer and nurse. His father was arrested in the night during the Great Purge in 1938 as an "enemy of the people," never to be seen again by his family. Kowalski and his mother lost their home and lived briefly in the polyclinic where his mother worked, then moved to the Dedenievo settlement, some 30 miles north of Moscow, where his mother worked in a nursing home. Kowalski joined the Red Pioneers in elementary school. He learned that his father had died in a Siberian camp some two years later, aged 36.

In June 1941, when Nazi Germany attacked the USSR, the Red Army retreated from Dedenievo, but the German army halted in nearby Jachroma (Yakhroma). However, the Germans bombed the settlement, killing many residents. Kowalski survived this period in the basement of an old church where peasants had stored vegetables from collective farms. In 1943, Kowalski's mother became a nurse in a Polish orphanage near Moscow, while Kowalski relearned Polish in the attached elementary school.

In 1946, the orphanage moved to Warsaw and merged into the existing Nasz Dom orphanage. His mother worked there as a nurse, and Kowalski attended a progressive gymnasium (high school). His mother re-joined the Polish Communist Party, and he joined the Union of Polish Youth. Kowalski then attended the Warsaw Polytechnic Institute (now the Warsaw University of Technology) and then also joined the Party.

As an engineer, Kowalski specialized in electro-medicine. He learned how to design electrical instruments for doctors. He obtained a graduate degree based on research at Warsaw's Radium Institute (now the Curie Institute, Warsaw). In 1956, his application to work in a nuclear laboratory in the Soviet Union was rejected, and he traveled to Paris, where his father's sister lived. He hoped to be able to pursue doctoral studies in France. A written recommendation from Cezary Pawlowski, director of the Radium Institute and a former assistant of Marie Curie, helped him join the laboratory of Joliot-Curie, where he worked for the next seven years. In 1963, having obtained his doctorate in Physics from the Sorbonne, he returned to Poland to work in an academic research laboratory.

In 1964, Kowalski attended a scientific conference in the US—and stayed on, becoming a research associate with Professor Jack Miller in Columbia University's Chemistry department. In 1969, he began a 35-year career as a professor and researcher of Physics at Montclair State University. Since retiring in 2004, he has continued to work in two areas of personal interest—conducting Physics experiments and writing about experience under the Communism of the Soviet Union from an anti-communism viewpoint.

== Works ==
Kowalski has authored and co-authored nearly 100 scholarly papers on Physics, a textbook on Physics, and two books on Stalinism.

In January 2011, Hoover Institution archived his original notebook diaries (in Polish), letters, and personal documents and photographs.

His papers can be found online. His presentations can be found online.

One of his memoirs is an autobiography based on a diary he kept between 1946 and 2004 (in the USSR, Poland, France, and the USA) and illustrates his evolution from one extreme to another—from devoted Stalinist to active anti-communist:

- Stalin's Hell on Earth. Wasteland Press. 2008. pp. (extracts online). ISBN 978-1-60047-232-9.
- Diary of a Former Communist: Thoughts, Feelings, Reality (memoirs online) (2010)

== See also ==
- Nuclear physics
- Warsaw University of Technology
- Curie Institute, Warsaw
