= Forbidden Friendships =

1996 book by Michael Rocke

Forbidden Friendships: Homosexuality and Male Culture in Renaissance Florence
- First edition cover
- Author: Michael Rocke
- Language: English
- Publisher: Oxford University Press
- Publication date: 1996
- ISBN: 0-19-506975-7 (first edition)
- LC Class: HQ76.3.I82 F57

Forbidden Friendships: Homosexuality and Male Culture in Renaissance Florence is a 1996 nonfiction book by Michael Rocke, published by Oxford University Press.
