= Jerzy Adam Kowalski =

Polish researcher and popular science author

Jerzy Adam Kowalski (born 1958) is a Polish researcher and popular science author in the field of human sexuality.

== Biography ==
He is a graduate of the Warsaw University, where from 1977 to 1984 he studied political science, journalism and psychology. He was a journalist, publisher and editor. From 2008 he is a research worker in the Institute of Sex Research in Opole, Poland and the chairman of board of the foundation for the institute. In 2019 he earned a PhD grade in the field of science of culture in the University of Social Sciences and Humanities in Warsaw.

== Selected publications ==
- Jerzy A. Kowalski, Homo eroticus, Wydawnictwo IBS, Opole 2011, Serie: Eros i logos. ISBN 978-83-931776-0-8 [In Polish].
- Jerzy A. Kowalski, Homo eroticus. Jak narodziła się ludzka seksualność (e-book), Wydawnictwo IBS, Opole 2011, ISBN 978-83-931776-4-6 [In Polish; the English title: Homo eroticus: How human sexuality had been arising]
- Jerzy A. Kowalski, The origins of homosexuality emancipation, Serie: Following Bronislaw Malinowski, An Amazon Kindle edition. The Institute of Sex Research in Opole Press, Opole 2015, ISBN 978-83-931776-3-9.
- Jerzy A. Kowalski, Sexual partner roles in homoerotic relations: An attempt of classification, Journal of Homosexuality, Latest articles: doi:10.1080/00918369.2015.1078639
- Jerzy A. Kowalski, Kulturowy sens rytuałów inicjacji dojrzałościowej, PhD thesis, the University of Social Sciences and Humanities in Warsaw. [In Polish; the English title: The cultural substance of pubertal rites]

== Other notes ==
He published in 2011 the book "Homo eroticus", devoted to the evolution of human sexuality. It discusses inter alia certain famous theories in the field and proposes interesting new explanations for this problems, e.g., the fur losing by humans, ovulation veiling in women, two type of woman sexual receptivity, the origination of intimacy, marriage, love, and initiation and circumcision rites. The book was highly praised by specialists and recommended as a reading for university students in Cracow, Poland.
