= Smith (surname) =

Family name

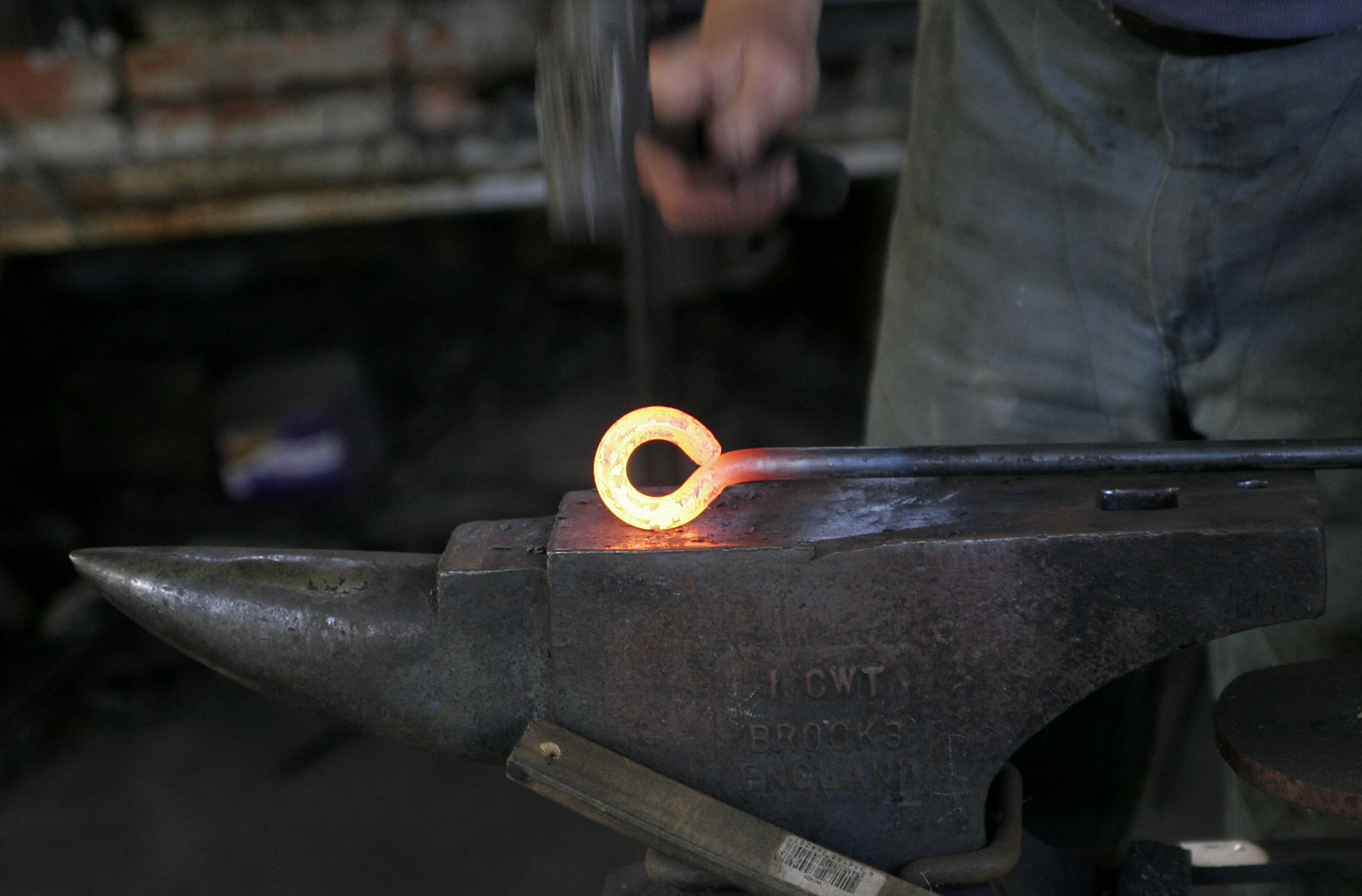
- A close-up of a blacksmith at work; Smith became a popular last name for those with this occupation.
- Pronunciation: /ˈsmɪθ/

Origin
- Origin: Old English
- Meaning: From smitan (to smite)
- Region of origin: England

Other names
- Variant form: Numerous

Smith is an occupational surname originating in England. It is the most prevalent surname in the United Kingdom, United States, Canada, Australia, and New Zealand, and the fifth most common surname in Ireland. In America, the surname Smith is particularly prevalent among those of English, Scottish, and Irish descent, but is also a common surname among African-Americans, which can be attributed either to the African slaves having been given the surname of their masters, or to being an occupational name, as some southern African-Americans took this surname to reflect their or their father's trade. 2,442,977 Americans shared the surname Smith at the time of the 2010 census, and more than 500,000 people shared it in the United Kingdom as of 2006. At the turn of the 20th century, the surname was sufficiently prevalent in England to have prompted the statement: "Common to every village in England, north, south, east, and west"; and sufficiently common on the (European) continent (in various forms) to be "common in most countries of Europe".

== Etymology and history ==
The name refers to a smith, originally deriving from smið or smiþ, the Old English term meaning 'one who works in metal', related to the word smitan, the Old English form of smite, which also meant 'strike' (as in early 17th century Biblical English: the verb to smite = 'to hit'). The Old English word smiþ comes from the Proto-Germanic word *smiþaz. Smithy comes from the Old English word smiðē from the Proto-Germanic *smiðjon. The use of Smith as an occupational surname dates back to Anglo-Saxon times, when inherited surnames were still unknown: Ecceard Smith of County Durham, North East England, was recorded in 975.

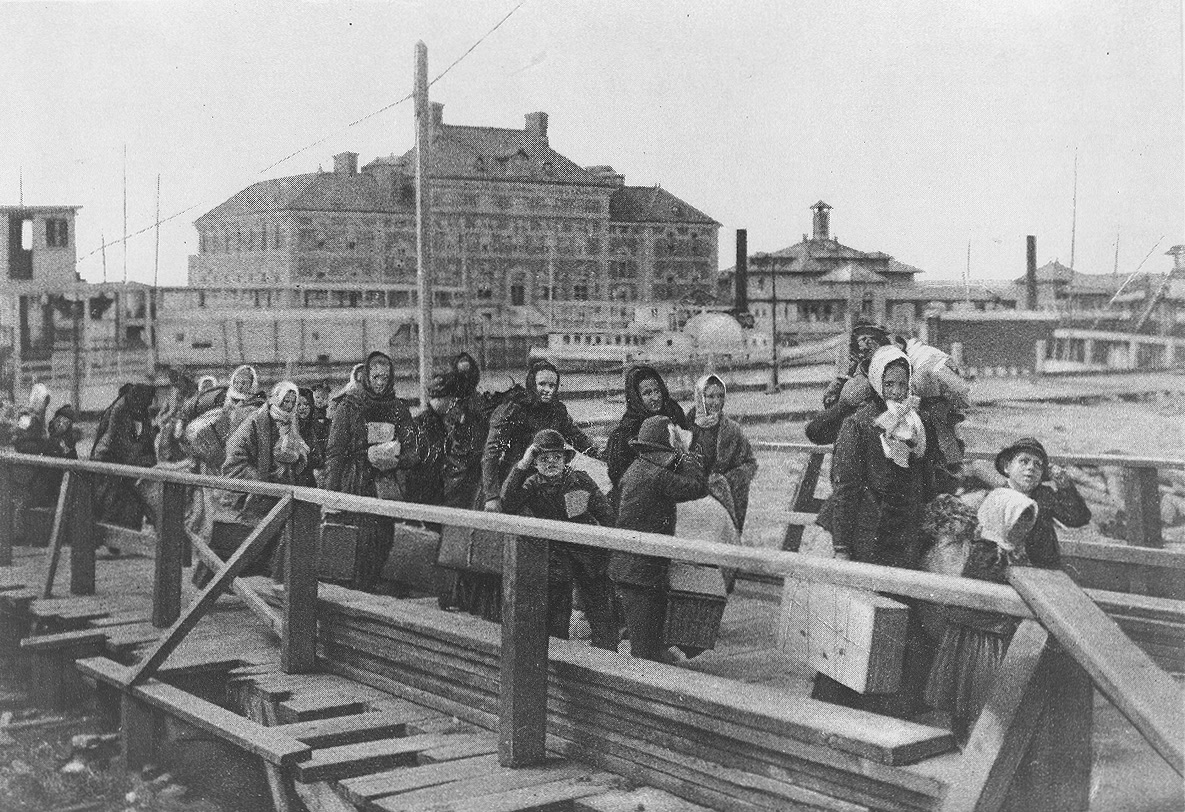
Immigrants arriving at Ellis Island; some chose more "American" surnames, like "Smith", on arrival

A popular misconception holds that at the beginning of the 20th century, when many new immigrants were entering the U.S., civil servants at Ellis Island responsible for cataloging the entry of such persons sometimes arbitrarily assigned new surnames if the immigrants' original surname was particularly lengthy, or difficult for the processor to spell or pronounce. While such claims may be exaggerated, many immigrants did choose to begin their American lives with more "American" names, particularly with Anglicised versions of their birth names; the German Schmidt was often Anglicized to Smith not only during the world wars, but also commonly in times of peace, and the Polish equivalent Kowalski was Anglicized to Smith as well.

== Variations ==
Variations of the surname Smith also remain very common. These include different spellings of the English name, and versions in other languages.

=== English variations ===
There is some disagreement about the origins of the numerous variations of the name Smith. The addition of an e at the end of the name is sometimes considered an affectation, but may have arisen either as an attempt to spell smithy or as the Middle English adjectival form of smith, which would have been used in surnames based on location rather than occupation (in other words, for someone living near or at the smithy).

Likewise, the replacement of the i with a y in Smyth or Smythe is also often considered an affectation but may have originally occurred because of the difficulty of reading blackletter text, where Smith might look like Snuth or Simth. However, Charles Bardsley wrote in 1901, "The y in Smyth is the almost invariable spelling in early rolls, so that it cannot exactly be styled a modern affectation."

Some variants (such as Smijth) were adopted by individuals for personal reasons, while others may have arisen independently or as offshoots from the Smith root. Names such as Smither and Smithers may in some cases be variants of Smith but in others independent surnames based on a meaning of light and active attributed to smyther. Additional derivatives include Smithman, Smithson and Smithfield (see below). Athersmith may derive from at the Smith.

Other variations focus on specialisms within the profession; for example Blacksmith, from those who worked predominantly with iron, Whitesmith, from those who worked with tin (and the more obvious Tinsmith), Brownsmith and Redsmith, from those who worked with copper (Coppersmith and Greensmith; copper is green when oxidised), Silversmith and Goldsmith – and those based on the goods produced, such as Hammersmith, Bladesmith, Naismith (nail-smith), Arrowsmith which in turn was shortened to Arsmith, or Shoesmith (referring to horseshoes). Sixsmith is a variant spelling of a sickle- or scythe-smith. Wildsmith in turn is a corruption of wheelsmith

The patronymic practice of attaching son to the end of a name to indicate that the bearer is the child of the original holder has also led to the surnames Smithson and Smisson. Historically, "Smitty" has been a common nickname given to someone with the surname, Smith; in some instances, this usage has passed into "Smitty" being used as a surname itself.

=== Other languages ===
Surnames relating to smiths and blacksmiths are found across the world. When relevant, transliterations are included in parentheses and italicised, and adaptations (i.e. anglicisations or gallicisations) in brackets. Additionally, brief etymologies are noted if a name used in a certain language derives from another language.

==== Celtic ====
| Language | Surnames |
|---|---|
| Breton | ar Gov [Le Goff], ar Govig [Le Goffic] |
| Cornish | an Gov [Angove, Goff, Goffe]; [Trengove] |
| Irish | Mac Gabhann [McGowan, MacGowan, McGouran] |
| Scottish Gaelic | Gobha [Gow]; Mac a' Ghobhainn [McGowan, MacGowan, McGavin], common in Elgin, Moray, and Galloway |
| Welsh | Gof [Goff], common in East Anglia in England |

==== Germanic ====
| Language | Surnames |
|---|---|
| Afrikaans | Smit, Smidt |
| Danish | Smed, Smidt (from German) |
| Dutch | Smit, Smits, Smid, Smidt |
| Flemish | De Smedt, Desmedt, De Smet, Desmet, Smets |
| Frisian | Smid |
| German | Kowalitz (from Slavic); Schmidt, Schmied, Schmiedel, Schmieden Alemannic: Schmid, Schmied, Schmed Bavarian: Schmid, Schmidl, Schmied, Schmitt, Schmitzer Franconian: Schmitt, Schmitz, Schmich Low German: Schmidt, Schmidtke, Schmick |
| Limburgish | Smeets |
| Luxembourgish | Schmit, Schmitz |
| Yiddish | שמידט (Schmidt), שמיט (Schmitt), שמיץ (Schmitz) |

==== Romance ====
| Language | Surnames |
|---|---|
| Catalan | Ferrer, Ferré, Farré, Fabra |
| French | Favre, Fabre, Favret Northern: Lefebvre, Lefèvre, Lefébure Western: Lefeuvre |
| Galician | Ferreiro, Ferreira |
| Italian | Ferraro Northern: Fabbro, Fabris, Ferrari, Ferrero Central: Fabbri Southern: Ferrara, Ferrera |
| Norman | Lefebvre, Lefèvre Anglo-Norman: Lefebvre [Feaver], Ferror [Farrar, Farrer, Ferrar, Farrow] |
| Occitan | Fabre, Fabré, Faure, Fauré, Dufaure |
| Portuguese | Ferreira, Ferreiro |
| Romanian | Feraru, Fieraru, Faur |
| Spanish | Herrero, Herrera, Ferrera, Ferrero |

==== Slavic ====
| Language | Surnames |
|---|---|
| Belarusian | Кавалевіч (Kavalevich), Кавалёў (Kavalyow), Кавалёнак (Kavalyonak), Кавальчук (Kavalchuk), Кавалюк (Kavalyuk), Коваль (Koval) |
| Bosnian | Kovač, Kovačić, Kovačević; Demirdžić (from Ottoman Turkish) |
| Bulgarian | Ковачевски (Kovačevski), Ковачев (Kovachev), Ковачино (Kovachino) |
| Croatian | Kovač, Kovačić, Kovačević, Kovačev, Kovačec, Kovaček |
| Czech | Kovář, Kovařík; Šmíd (from German); Šmicer (from Bavarian) |
| Kashubian | Kowalski, Kowalewski |
| Macedonian | Ковачевски (Kovačevski), Ковачев (Kovačev) |
| Polish | Kowal, Kowalewicz, Kowalski, Kowalik, Kowalczyk, Kowalewski, Kuźniar, Kuźniarski; Szmidt (from German) |
| Russian | Ковалевич (Kovalevich), Ковалёв (Kovalyov), Ковальков (Kovalkov), Ковалевский (Kovalevskiy), Кузнецкий (Kuznetskiy), Кузнецов (Kuznetsov), Кузнецовский (Kuznetsovskiy), Кузнечевский (Kuznechevskiy), Кузнеченко (Kuznechenko), Кузнеченков (Kuznechenkov), Кузнечихин (Kuznechikhin); Шмидов (Shmidov) (from German or Yiddish) |
| Rusyn | Ковалькевич (Kovalkevich), Ковалёвич (Kovalyovich), Кузняк (Kuzniak) |
| Serbian | Ковачевић (Kovačević), Ковач (Kovač), Ковачев (Kovačev) |
| Slovak | Kováč, Kováčik, Kovačovič, Kovalík |
| Slovene | Kovač, Kovačič |
| Ukrainian | Ковалевич (Kovalevych), Коваленко (Kovalenko), Ковальчук (Kovalchuk), Коваль (Koval), Ковальков (Kovalkov), Ковалевський (Kovalevskyi), Ковалюк (Kovalyuk) |
| Upper Sorbian | Kowar, Kowarjec |

==== Other European ====
| Language | Surnames |
|---|---|
| Albanian | Nallbani |
| Basque | Arotza |
| Estonian | Sepp |
| Finnish | Seppä, Seppälä, Seppänen |
| Greek | Σιδεράς (Sideras) |
| Hungarian | Kovács (from Slavic), Koufax (corruption) |
| Latvian | Kalējs; Šmits (from German) |
| Lithuanian | Kalvaitis, Kavaliauskas; Kovalskis (from Slavic) |

==== South Asian ====
| Language | Surnames |
|---|---|
| Bengali | কর্মকার (Karmakar) |
| Hindi | लोहार (Lohar) |
| Kannada | ಕಮ್ಮಾರ (Kammara) |
| Malayalam | കമ്മാരൻ (Kammaaran) |
| Nepali | कामी (Kami) |
| Oriya | କମାର (Kamara) |
| Punjabi | ਲੁਹਾਰ (Lohar) |
| Sanskrit | अयस्काम (Ayaskama), कर्मार (Karmara), लोहकार (Lohakara), व्योकार (Vyokara) |
| Tamil | கம்மாளர் (Kammalar) |
| Telugu | కమ్మరి (Kammari) |

==== Other ====
| Language | Surnames |
|---|---|
| Arabic | حداد (Haddad) |
| Azerbaijani | Dəmirçi |
| Aramaic | Haddad |
| Armenian | Դարբինյան (Darbinyan, Tarpinyan, ), Գումուչեան (Gumuchian) |
| Balinese | Pande |
| Bataknese | Sitepu |
| Chinese | 铁 (Tie) |
| Georgian | მჭედლიძე (Mchedlidze), მჭედლიშვილი (Mchedlishvili) |
| Hebrew | חדד (Haddad) |
| Japanese | 鍛冶屋 (Kajiya) |
| Kazakh | Tömirshi |
| Lingala | Motuli |
| Median | Esmi |
| Minahasa | Marentek |
| Persian | زرگر (Zargar) |
| Syriac | ܚܕܕܐ (Hadodo, Hadad, Haddad) |
| Tatar | Tümerche |
| Turkish | Demirci |
| Uyghur | Tömürchi |

== See also ==
- List of people with surname Smith
- List of most common surnames in Europe
- Smith Family (disambiguation)
- Smith (given name)
- Smith (taxonomic authority)
- Smith and Jones (disambiguation)
- Psmith
