= Slavic name suffixes =

A Slavic name suffix is a common way of forming patronymics, family names, and pet names in the Slavic languages. Many, if not most, Slavic last names are formed by adding possessive and other suffixes to given names and other words. Most Slavic surnames have suffixes which are found in varying degrees across the different nations. Some surnames are not formed in this way, including names of non-Slavic origin. They are also seen in North America, Argentina, and Australia.

An example using an occupation is kovač, koval or kowal, which means blacksmith. It is the root of the names Kovačević, Kovačić, Kowalski, Kowalchuk, Kowalczyk, Kovachev, Kovalenko, Kovalyov, and Kovalev. All mean "descendant of a blacksmith".

The given name Petr, Petro, Pyotr or Petar (equivalent to Peter) can become Petrov, Petriv, Petriw, Petrenko, Petrovsky, Petrović, Petrić, Petrič, Petrich, etc. All mean "descendant of Peter". This is similar to the use of "-son" or "-sen" in Germanic languages.

In East Slavic languages (Belarusian, Russian, Rusyn, and Ukrainian) the same system of name suffixes can be used to express several meanings. One of the most common is the patronymic. Instead of a secondary "middle" given name, people identify themselves with their given and family name and patronymic, a name based on their father's given name. If a man gives his full name as Boris Vladimirovich Kuznetsov, then his father's name must have been Vladimir. Vladimirovich literally means "Vladimir's [son]".

Similarly, many suffixes can be attached to express affection or informality (in linguistics, called a diminutive). For example, calling a boy named Ivan "Ivanko", "Ivo", "Ivica" etc., or Yuri "Yurko", expresses that he is familiar to you. This is the same as referring to Robert as "Rob," "Bob" and "Bobby"; or William as "Bill", "Will" and "Willy". Unlike in English, nicknames can be derived from the middle of names, such as "Sasha" from "Aleksander."

Suffix		Region	Notes
Cyrillic	Roman	Region	Notes
-оў/-ов/-ев/-ёв/-ів (-ова/-ева/-ёва)	-oŭ/-ov/-ev/-yov/-iv (-ova/-eva/-yova)	Russia, Ukraine, Belarus, Bulgaria, North Macedonia, Serbia (especially in Vojvodina), Croatia (rare)	This has been adopted by many non-Slavic peoples of Central Asia and the Caucasus who are or have been under Russian rule, such as the Tatars, Chechens, Kyrgyz, Uzbeks, Kazakhs, Tajiks, Azerbaijanis, Turkmens, etc. Note that -ev (Russian unstressed and non-Russian) and -yov (Russian stressed) are the soft form of -ov, found after palatalized consonants or sibilants. The suffix -off comes from the French transliteration of -ov, based on the Muscovite pronunciation. Note also that in Pannonian Rusyn, -ов and -ова are generally only used when the person's first name is omitted.
	-ová	Czech Republic and Slovakia	Not a possessive suffix (unlike -ova would be in these languages), but rather it makes a feminine adjective out of a surname. Example: Krejčí 'tailor' (male form), Krejčová 'tailored' (female form)
-цкий (-цкая); -ский (-ская); -ський (-ська); -ски (-ска)	-cki (-cka); -sky (-ska); -ski (-ska) (Polish and Macedonian); -skiy (-skaya); -ský (-ská)	Poland, Ukraine, Belarus, Russia, Czech Republic, Slovakia, Bulgaria, North Macedonia, Serbia (especially in Vojvodina), Croatia	
-овић/-евић; -ић; -ович/-овіч/-евич (-овна/-евна); -ич/-ыч (-инична/-ычна)	-ović/-ević; -ić; -ovič /-evič (-ovna/-evna); -ič; -icz; -owicz/-ewicz; -ich (American Spelling); -owitz/-ovitz (German spelling)	Bosnia and Herzegovina, Montenegro, Croatia, Serbia (only -ić endings), North Macedonia (rare), occasionally Bulgaria (-ич, -на endings) Slovenia, Slovakia, Czech Republic (-ič, -na), Poland (-icz/-owicz/-ewicz), Ukraine, Belarus, Russia (-ич, -ыч, -на)	Polish patronymics -icz/-owicz/-ewicz are predominantly of East Slavic origin. Example: Petrović means Petr's son. In Russia, where patronyms are used, a person may have two -(ov)ich names in a row; first the patronym, then the family name (e.g. Dmitri Dmitriyevich Shostakovich).
-ин (-ина)	-in (-ina)	Russia, Serbia (especially in Vojvodina), Croatia, Bosnia, Montenegro, Bulgaria, Ukraine (rare)	
-ко -ка	-ko -ka	Ukraine (to a lesser extent in Belarus, Russia, Poland, Czech Republic, Slovakia)	diminutive suffix
-енко	-enko	Ukraine, Belarus, (to a lesser extent in Russia)	Of Ukrainian origin.
	-ak (-akova); -ek (-ekova); -ik (-ikova)	Czech Republic, Slovakia, Poland, Belarus, Ukraine, Bosnia, Montenegro, Slovenia, Croatia, Serbia, also in Russia	
-ак/-ик/-ук/-юк; -чак, -чик, -чук	-ak/-yak; -ik/-yk; -uk/-yuk; -čak, -ček, -čik, -čuk; -czak, -czuk, -czyk; -chak, -chik, -chuk, -chyk	Czech Republic, Slovakia, Croatia, Slovenia, Poland Ukraine, Belarus, Russia	
-ец; -єць	-ac; -ec	Bosnia, Montenegro, Slovenia, Croatia, Serbia (only -ac), North Macedonia (-ец), Czech Republic and Slovakia (-ec), Belarus and Russia (-ец) and Ukraine (-єць)	
-чик	-chik; -chyk; -czyk	Ruthenian use of this diminutive suffix for patronymics (now Belarus, Ukraine, Poland, also common in Russia)	

== See also ==
- Ashkenazi Jewish surnames
- Belarusian name
- Bosnian name
- Bulgarian names
- Croatian name
- Czech names
- Polish names
- Russian names
- Serbian names
- Slovak name
- Ukrainian name
- Slavic names
