= Kovacevich =

Kovacevich is a surname. Notable people with the surname include:

- Christopher Kovacevich (1928–2010), Metropolitan bishop of Libertyville and Chicago in the Serbian Orthodox Church
- Micah Kovacevich (born 1997), Canadian sledge hockey player
- Richard Kovacevich (born 1943), retired chairman of the board of directors and previous CEO of Wells Fargo & Company
- Stephen Kovacevich (1940–2026), American classical pianist and conductor

== See also ==
- Kovachevich, surname
- Kovačević, surname
- Kovačevič, surname
- Kovalevich, surname
- Kovach (surname)
- Kovač (surname)
