= Farre =

Farre or Farré is a surname, and may refer to:

- Antonio Farré (b. 1961), Spanish actor, voice-over artist, and television host
- Arthur Farre (1811–1887), English obstetric physician
- Frederic John Farre (1804–1886), English physician
- Guillermo Farré (b. 1981), Argentine footballer
- Jean-Joseph Farre (1816–1887), French general and statesman
- John Richard Farre (1775–1862), English physician
- Juan Avilés Farré (1950–2023), Spanish historian and professor
- Mariella Farré (b. 1963), Swiss singer
- Norma Pujol i Farré (b. 1988), Catalan teacher and politician
- Rowena Farre (1921–1979), British writer
- William Farre (1874–1950), Norwegian musician, conductor, and composer

== See also ==
- Far (disambiguation)
- Farres
- Sònia Farré Fidalgo
- Miguel Farré Mallofré
- Josep Maria Farré Naudi
- Joan Albert Farré Santuré
