= Novopetrovka =

Novopetrovka may refer to the following places in Russia:

- Novopetrovka, Altai Krai
- Novopetrovka, Blagoveshchensky District, Amur Oblast
- Novopetrovka, Konstantinovsky District, Amur Oblast
- Novopetrovka, Karmaskalinsky District, Republic of Bashkortostan
- Novopetrovka, Sharansky District, Republic of Bashkortostan

== See also ==
- Novopetrivka (disambiguation)
- Novopetrovsk (disambiguation)
- Novopetrovsky (disambiguation)
