= Kovalenko =

Kovalenko (Ukrainian: Коваленко) is a Ukrainian surname. It is a patronymic surname derived from the occupational nickname koval (Ukrainian: коваль), "blacksmith". Notable people with the surname include:

- Aleksandr Kovalenko (disambiguation), multiple people
- Alevtina Kovalenko (born 1980), Russian bobsledder
- Anastassia Kovalenko (born 1991), Estonian motorcycle road racer
- Andrei Kovalenko (disambiguation), multiple people
- Bohdan Kovalenko (born 1997), Ukrainian footballer
- Dema Kovalenko (born 1977), Ukrainian footballer
- Igor Kovalenko (born 1988), Ukrainian chess grandmaster
- Irina Kovalenko (born 1984), Russian model
- Iryna Kovalenko (born 1986), Ukrainian high jumper
- Kostiantyn Kovalenko (born 1986), Ukrainian footballer
- Lyudmyla Kovalenko (born 1989), Ukrainian athlete
- Nikolai Kovalenko – Russian and American ice hockey player (born 1999)
- Oleg Kovalenko (born 1988), Ukrainian footballer
- Oleksandr Kovalenko (disambiguation), multiple people
- Oleksii Oleksandrovych Kovalenko (1981–2022), Ukrainian military pilot
- Sergey Kovalenko (disambiguation), multiple people
- Viktor Kovalenko (disambiguation), multiple people
- Vitali Kovalenko (born 1934), Russian volleyball player
- Vyacheslav Kovalenko (born 1946), Russian diplomat
- Yevhen Kovalenko (born 1992), Ukrainian footballer
- Yuriy Kovalenko (1977–2014), Ukrainian soldier and Hero of Ukraine recipient
- Yuriy Kovalenko (1966–2023), Ukrainian scientist, archaeologist, local historian, teacher, musician, and staff sergeant of the Armed Forces of Ukraine.

== See also ==
- Koval (surname)
- Kovalyov, a surname
