= Petrovsk =

Petrovsk may refer to:

- Petrovsk, Saratov Oblast, a town in Saratov Oblast, Russia, on the Medveditsa River
- Petrovsk (inhabited locality), several places in Russia
- Petrovsk (air base), an air base in Saratov Oblast, Russia
- Petrovsk-Port, name of the city of Makhachkala in the Republic of Dagestan, Russia, in 1857–1921

== See also ==
- Petrovsky (disambiguation)
- Petrovsk-Zabaykalsky (disambiguation)
- Novopetrovsk (disambiguation)
