= Kovalchuk =

Kovalchuk (Ukrainian and Russian: Ковальчук), Kavalchuk (Belarusian: Кавальчук), Kowalczuk, Later Kovalčuk (Polish), Covalciuc (Romanian), also transliterated as Kowalchuk (in the North American diaspora), is a common East Slavic surname (one of the most popular in Ukraine). The Kovalchuk name extends back to before 1500 AD in Kievan Rus.

Koval (Коваль) translates as forge or blacksmith. The suffix -chuk denoted as either a son of, or an apprentice to a blacksmith. It is somewhat similar in commonality to the English surname Smith. It is also cognate with the very popular Polish surnames Kowalczyk and Kowalski.

In East Slavic languages, the correct pronunciation is ko-vahl-CHOOK. Among Ukrainian Canadians, the pronunciation ko-WAL-chuk is more common.

== People ==
=== Kovalchuk ===
- Andrey Kovalchuk (born 1959), Russian sculptor
- Andrii Kovalchuk (born 1972), Ukrainian general
- Anna Kovalchuk (born 1977), Russian actress
- Boris Kovalchuk (born 1977), Russian official, son of Yury Kovalchuk
- Ekaterina Kovalchuk (born 1990), Belarusian footballer
- Ilya Kovalchuk (born 1983), Russian ice hockey player
- Kyrylo Kovalchuk (born 1986), Ukrainian footballer
- Maria Kovalchuk, Ukrainian model and victim of human trafficking in Dubai
- Mikhail Kovalchuk (born 1946), Russian physicist and politician
- Oleksii Kovalchuk (born 1989), Ukrainian poker player
- Olga Kovalchuk (born 1976), Ukrainian Paralympic sport shooter
- Petro Kovalchuk (born 1984), Ukrainian footballer
- Sergey Petrovich Kovalchuk (born 1973), Belarusian footballer
- Tatiana Kovalchuk (born 1979), Ukrainian tennis player
- Victoria Kovalchuk (1954–2021), Ukrainian artist
- Yury Kovalchuk (born 1951), Russian businessman and financier

=== Kavalchuk ===
- Aksana Kavalchuk (born 1979), Belarusian volleyball player
- Maksim Kavalchuk (born 2000), Belarusian footballer
- Syarhey Kavalchuk (born 1978), Belarusian footballer

=== Kowalczuk ===
- Aleksandra Kowalczuk (born 1996), Polish taekwondo practitioner
- Chris Kowalczuk (born 1985), Canadian football player
- Ilko-Sascha Kowalczuk (born 1967), German historian and author
- Jadwiga Kowalczuk (1931–1998), Polish athlete

=== Other ===
- Ed Kowalchuk (1926–2003), Canadian politician
- John Russell Kowalchuk (1921–2000), Canadian politician
- Serghei Covalciuc (born 1982), Moldovan-Ukrainian footballer
