= Kovačić =

Kovačić (Serbo-Croatian, Serbo-Croatian Cyrillic: Ковачић), alternatively spelled Kovačič in Slovene and Slovak (feminine (Slovak): Kovačičová), Kovacsics in Hungarian, or transliterated as Kovacic/Kovacich/Kovachich in English, is one of the most common surnames in Croatia, Slovenia, as well as Hungary and Serbia. Etymologically it is a patronymic derivative of the surname Kovač, which is a Slavic cognate of the English surname Smith, and as such is closely related to the similar surname Kovačević.

In Croatia the form Kovačić is more common than Kovač, whereas in Slovenia it is the other way around. There are around 12,000 people with this surname in Croatia, making it the 7th most common in the country.

It may refer to:

- Anikó Kovacsics (b. 1991), Hungarian handballer
- Ante Kovačić (1854–1889), Croatian writer
- Antun Kovacic (born 1981), Australian footballer
- Bruno Kovačić (b. 1967), Croatian musician
- Dieter Kovačič (b. 1973), real name of the Austrian musician better known as Dieb13
- Emilio Kovačić (b. 1968), Croatian basketball player
- Ernst Kovacic (born 1943), Austrian violinist and conductor
- Igor Kovačić (b. 1979), Serbian sprint canoer
- Ivan Goran Kovačić (1913–1943), Croatian poet
- Jelena Kovačič (1925–2003), Slovenian-Belgian botanist and horticulturist
- Josef Kovačič (1961–2026), Czech footballer
- Lojze Kovačič (1928–2004), Slovenian writer
- Maria Kovacic, Australian politician
- Mateo Kovačić (b. 1994), Croatian footballer
- Miklós Kovacsics (1953–2005), Hungarian handball player
- Miljenko Kovačić (1973–2005), Croatian footballer
- Miodrag Kovačić (b. 1965), Serbian weightlifter
- Peter Kovačič Peršin (b. 1945), Slovenian theologian
- Risto Kovačić (1845–1909), Serbian scholar and writer
- Viktor Kovačić (1874–1924), Croatian architect
- William Kovacic, member of the United States Federal Trade Commission
- Zdravko-Ćiro Kovačić (1925–2015), Croatian water polo player

== See also ==
- List of most common surnames in Europe
