= Petrich (disambiguation) =

Petrich is a city in south-western Bulgaria, Blagoevgrad Province.

Petrich may also refer to:

- Petrich, Sofia Province, a village in western Bulgaria, Sofia Province
- Petrich (surname)
- Petrich Peak, an ice-covered peak in the Antarctica
- The name of Petarch until 1934
- A medieval name of the Asen's Fortress

== See also ==
- Petrič (disambiguation)
- Petrić, a surname
- Petric (disambiguation)
