= Naudi =

Naudi is a surname. Notable people with the surname include:

- Antoni Naudi (born 1951), Andorran alpine skier
- Josep Maria Farré Naudi (born 1960), Andorran politician
- Miquel Naudí (1948–2026), Andorran hotelier and politician
