= Smith (given name) =

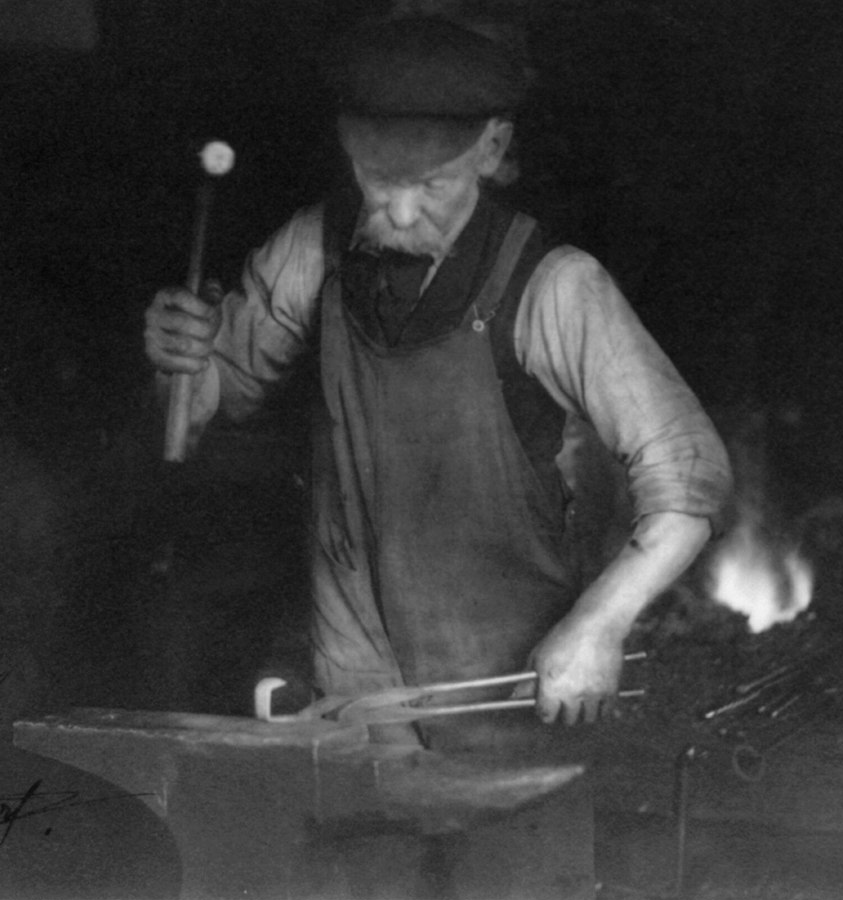
- A blacksmith at work. Blacksmiths commonly took the surname Smith, which led to the adoption of Smith as a given name.
- Gender: Masculine
- Language: English

Origin
- Language: Old English
- Derivation: smið, meaning "to smite"
- Meaning: a metalworker, a craftsman
- Region of origin: England

Smith is a male given name, derived from the similarly named surname. Notable people with the name include:

- Smith Alford (c. 1877-1949), American college football player and coach
- Smith D. Atkins (1836-1913), American army general
- Smith Bagley (1935-2010), American businessman and Democratic Party executive
- Smith Ballew (1902-1984), American singer-songwriter
- Smith Barrier (1916-1989), American sports journalist
- Smith A. Boughton (1810-1888), American physician and political activist
- Smith W. Brookhart (1869-1944), American U.S. Senator for Iowa
- Smith Cho, American actress
- Smith Churchill (1838-1902), English cricketer and clergyman
- Smith Clark (c. 1791-1876), American lawyer and legislator
- Smith Curtis (1855-1949), Canadian lawyer and politician
- Smith Dharmasaroja (1937-), Thai government official
- Smith Dun (1906-1979), Burmese lieutenant general
- Smith Ely Jr. (1825-1911), American politician and 82nd Mayor of New York City
- Smith Gilley (1939–2026), American politician
- Smith Hart (1948-2017), American-Canadian wrestler
- Smith H. Hastings (1843-1905), American Medal of Honor recipient
- Smith Hempstone (1929-2006), American diplomat
- Smith Hickenlooper (1880-1933), American judge
- Smith Ely Jelliffe (1866-1945), American psychoanalyst
- Smith Joseph (1961-), American physician and former mayor of North Miami, Florida
- Smith E. Lane (1829-1909), American politician
- Smith Larimer (1829-1881), American Medal of Honor recipient
- Smith McKay (1817-1899), Canadian merchant and politician
- Smith McPherson (1848-1915), American judge and U.S. Representative for Iowa
- Smith Miller (1804-1872), American U.S. Representative for Indiana
- Smith Nickerson (1860-1954), Canadian politician
- Smith Newell Penfield (1837-1920), American composer
- Smith Samau (1986-), New Zealand rugby player
- Smith Snowden (born 2005), American football player
- Smith Streeter (1884-1930), American-Canadian roque player and Olympian
- Smith Thompson (1768-1843), American Secretary of the Navy and Supreme Court Associate Justice
- Smith S. Turner (1842-1898), American U.S. Representative for Virginia
- Smith Vilbert (born 2001), American football player
- Smith Mead Weed (1833-1920), American lawyer and politician
- Smith Wigglesworth (1859-1947), British evangelist
- Smith S. Wilkinson (1824-1889), American lawyer and politician
- Smith D. Woods (1830-1888), American former Mayor of Kansas City, Missouri

== See also ==
- Smith (surname)
- Seppo
