= List of taxonomic authorities by name =

Following is a partial list of taxonomic authorities by name — for taxonomists with some common surnames.

== Adams ==
- Andrew Leith Adams (1827–1882), Scottish zoologist
- Arthur Adams (1820–1878), English physician and naturalist, brother of Henry Adams
- Charles Baker Adams (1814–1853), American conchologist
- Charles Dennis Adams (C.D.Adams, 1920–), botanist
- Henry Adams (1813–1877), English naturalist and conchologist, brother of Arthur Adams
- Johannes Michael Friedrich Adams (Adams, 1780–1838), Russian botanist
- Joseph Edison Adams (J.E.Adams, 1904–1981), botanist
- Laurence George Adams (L.G.Adams, 1929–), botanist
- Robert Phillip Adams (R.P.Adams, 1939–), botanist

== Chandler ==
- Donald S. Chandler, an entomologist
- Gregory T. Chandler, a botanist
- Harry Phylander Chandler (1917–1955), an American entomologist
- Marjorie E.J. Chandler, an English paleobotanist
- Peter Chandler, an entomologist

== Clark ==
See for species named after taxonomic authorities named Clark.

- Austin Hobart Clark (1880–1954), American zoologist
- Benjamin Preston Clark, English entomologist
- Eugenie Clark (1922–2015) (E. Clark), ichthyologist
- Hubert Lyman Clark (1870–1947) (H.L. Clark), zoologist specialist of echinoderms
- James Michael Clark (J.M. Clark)
- John Clark (1885–1956), Australian entomologist
- John L. Clark (J.L.Clark), botanist

== Gray ==
See for species named after taxonomic authorities named Gray.

- Asa Gray (1810–1888), American botanist (IPNI=A.Gray)
- George Robert Gray (1808–1872), British zoologist; son of Samuel Frederick Gray
- John Edward Gray (1800–1875), British zoologist; son of Samuel Frederick Gray (IPNI=J.E.Gray)
- Michael R. Gray, Australian arachnologist
- Samuel Frederick Gray (1766–1828), British botanist (IPNI =Gray)

== Schneider ==
- Gotthard Schneider (Gotth.Schneider), German lichenologist and teacher
- Johann Gottlob Schneider (1750–1822), German classicist and naturalist
- Camillo Karl Schneider (C.K.Schneider, 1876–1951), Austrian botanist
- Scott Alexander Schneider (born 1982), American coccidologist

== Smith ==
See for species named after taxonomic authorities named Smith.

- See List of taxonomic authorities named Smith

== Thomson ==
- Carl Gustaf Thomson (1824–1899), Swedish entomologist - Thomson is his official abbreviation
- James Thomson (1828–1897), American entomologist
- Scott Thomson (born 1966), Australian taxonomist and palaeontologist (turtles). Generally abbreviated as S. Thomson
- Thomas Thomson (1817–1878), British physician and botanist - Thomson is his official botanical author abbreviation according to IPNI

== Walker ==
See for species named after taxonomic authorities named Walker.

- Alick Donald Walker (A. Walker, 1925–1999), British palaeontologist
- Bryant Walker (1856–1936), American amateur malacologist
- Cyril Alexander Walker (1939–2009), British palaeontologist
- Edmund Murton Walker (E.M. Walker, 1877–1969), Canadian entomologist
- Francis Walker (F. Walker, 1809–1874), entomologist
- Warren F. Walker (W.F. Walker)

== See also ==
- Botanical taxa by author — alphabetical.
- Animal taxa by author — alphabetical.
- Taxa by author — all taxa fields, alphabetical.
- Category: Taxonomists
