= Petric =

Petric may refer to:

- Petric (surname)
- Petrić, a South Slavic surname
- Petrič (disambiguation), a Slovene surname and Serbian toponym
- Petric (band), a Canadian country music band

== See also ==
- Petrich (disambiguation)
