= Smithson =

Smithson or Smythson is an English surname and (less often) a given name.

Notable people bearing the name include:

== Architects ==
- Alison and Peter Smithson, 20th-century British architects
- Robert Smythson, 16th-century English architect, father of architect John Smythson, and grandfather of architect Huntingdon Smithson

== Artists and entertainers ==
- Annie M. P. Smithson, novelist
- Robert Smithson, American artist
- Carly Smithson, singer
- Florence Smithson, singer and actor
- Harriet Smithson, also known as Henrietta Constance Smithson, actor and wife of Hector Berlioz
- Henry Smithson, the musician Riton

== Politicians ==
- Hugh Smithson, (1714–86) later Hugh Percy, 1st Duke of Northumberland
  - the Smithson baronets
- Smithson E. Wright, 16th mayor of Columbus, Ohio

== Scientists ==
- James Smithson, British scientist, eponym of the Smithsonian Institution
- Smithson Tennant, chemist

== Sportspeople ==
- Bryan Smithson, American basketball player
- Fish Smithson, former NFL player
- Forrest Smithson, American athlete
- Gerald Smithson, English cricketer
- Jerred Smithson, former NHL player
- Moondog Spike, wrestler born Bill Smithson
- Rodney Smithson, footballer who played for Oxford United

== Others ==
- Alan Smithson, Bishop of Jarrow
- John Smithson (university president), American college administrator
- John Smithson, producer at the Discovery Channel
- Mike Smithson (disambiguation), several people

== Fiction ==
- Andrea Smithson Darling, a character on Dirty Sexy Money
- Charles Smithson, a major character in The French Lieutenant's Woman
- "Smithson", a webcomic by Shaenon K. Garrity

== In other languages ==
- Ben-Hadad (Syriac)
- Kovachevich, Kovačević, Kovalevich, Kovalenko (Slavic)

== See also ==
- Smithson (crater)
- Smithson Glacier
- Smithson, Indiana
- Smythson, a British company
- Smithson Valley High School
- Smithson–McCall Farm
- Smithson and McKay Brothers Blocks
- Mount Smithson, one of the Prince Olav Mountains
