= Petrivske =

Petrivske (Ukrainian: Петрівське) may refer to:

- The former name of Stepove, Donetsk Oblast
- The former name of Petrivka, Volnovakha Raion, Donetsk Oblast
- The former name of Hrekivka, Luhansk Oblast
- The former name of Blahodatne, Kherson Raion, Kherson Oblast

== See also ==
- Petrovske
- Petrovsky (disambiguation)
