= Smithian =

Smithian may refer to:

- Smithian (regional geological stage), a regional geological stage of the Early Triassic epoch (249.7 – 247.4 Ma) preceded by the Dienerian and followed by the Spathian
- Smithian, pertaining to, or characteristic of Adam Smith (1723–1790), Scottish philosopher and pioneer of political economy
- Smithian, something of, pertaining to, or characteristic of a person bearing the surname Smith
