= Schmick =

Schmick is a surname of German origin, similar to the meaning of "smith" as in blacksmith.

== Variations ==
- Schmidt (northern Germany)
- Schmid (southern Germany)
- Schmitz (Rhineland)
- Schmied
- Schmitt
- Schmich (Baden-Württemberg, Southwest Germany)
- Smith (English)
- Schminke

== Origins ==
The name is first found in the northern provinces that were later to make up Prussia, where the name emerged in mediaeval times as the name of one of the notable families of the region.

Many immigrants from Germany with the surname Schmich changed the spelling to Schmick, in line with the English pronunciation.

Some of the first settlers of the United States with this name or variants were: Anna Maria Schmidt, who went to New York State in 1710; and Johannes Schmidt who went to Germantown, Pennsylvania between 1683 and 1709. Arnd Schmidt emigrated with his family and with many other Schmidts to England or America in 1709.

== Notable people with the surname ==
- Joe Schmick, a member of the Washington State House of Representatives, representing the 9th Legislative District
- Douglas Schmick (1947–2016), co-founder of the American seafood-focused McCormick & Schmick's restaurant chain
- Mary Schmich, Pulitzer-Prize winning columnist for the Chicago Tribune newspaper
