= Petrič =

Petrič may refer to:

- Petrič (surname), a Slovene surname

or:

- Veliki Petrič, a fortress in Serbia
- Mali Petrič, a fortress in Serbia

== See also ==
- Petrić, a surname
- Petrich (disambiguation)
- Petrich
- Petric (disambiguation)
