= Oskar Schmiedel =

German pharmacist

Oskar Schmiedel (30 October 1887 – 27 December 1959) was a pharmacist, anthroposophist, therapist, Goethean scientist and theosophist.

== Life ==
Schmiedel was born on 30 October 1887 in Vienna. His father came to Vienna from the Saxon part of the Ore Mountains. He had a paper factory. His mother was Viennese. Oskar did a year of military service and studied chemistry at the Ludwig-Maximilians-Universität München afterwards. In 1907, he joined the Theosophical Society. Soon after this he saw and heard Rudolf Steiner and became his personal pupil after hearing a lecture in Michael Bauer's house in Nuremberg. He devoted his whole life to anthroposophy. He became involved with the first performance of the Mystery Plays, building scenery and acting as a stagehand. He was in charge of the first groups of eurythmists that appeared on stage. It was also in Munich that he met his wife.

The couple were called by Rudolf Steiner in 1914 to help build the Goetheanum. In a primitive shed he produced vegetable paints for the painting of the domes of the First Goetheanum. He developed protective varnish for the woodwork and modeling wax for the designers, as well as the pigments for Dr. Felix Peiper's colour-chamber therapy and medicines for a number of physicians based on information given by Rudolf Steiner.

During the war years he did military service in Innsbruck. Here he had an opportunity for a thorough study of Goethe's theory of color. After the war he devoted himself entirely to producing medicine and made the first mistletoe preparation for Ita Wegman. He also sold Ritter's photodynamic medicines. Collaboration with Dr. Ludwig Noll led to a series of monographs that always referred back to Rudolf Steiner.

1920 he heard Steiner in a lecture in Basel say he hoped to speak on the subject of medicine to the members of the medical profession one day. Schmiedel took the initiative and organized a course called the Spiritual Science and Medicine/Introducing Anthroposophical Medicine course given to 40 mainly homeopathic physicians in Dornach.

Dr. Otto Palmer established in Stuttgart in 1920 a clinic for patients. In 1921 Dr. Ita Wegman established the Institute of Clinical Medicine in Arlesheim. Further medical courses were given by Steiner in 1921, 1922 and 1923. Soon the Internationale Laboratorien AG (ILAG) came about in Arlesheim. When the economic enterprise Der Kommende Tag went bankrupt due to inflation, this included the branches in Schwäbisch Gmünd and Stuttgart. Branches were established in the Netherlands, England, France, Austria and the United States. In 1928 the name officially changed from ILAG to that of 'Weleda' which Rudolf Steiner had suggested for the English firm.

From 1935 onwards Oskar Schmiedel had to give more time to the German Weleda, together with Wilhelm Pelikan, Fritz Goette and Arthur von Zabern. He moved to Stuttgart and later to Schwäbisch Gmünd. After the war Oskar Schmiedel worked on the establishment and development of a number of firms abroad, doing so in Austria in 1949, where he also explored the places where Rudolf Steiner had lived when young.

In 1951, Oskar Schmiedel returned to Schwäbisch Gmünd, where he ran the Weleda together with Wilhelm Pelikan, Arthur von Zabern and Wilhelm Spiess until he died in his 73rd year. Hans Krueger, Walther Cloos, Theodor Schwenk, Alfred Friedrich, Mechthild Werner and others also contributed much to the work. He was particularly interested in all social impulses. He encouraged and supported the Study Sessions, works eurythmy, the Christmas Plays and the Weleda Nachrichten magazine.

Schmiedel died on 27 December 1959 in Schwäbisch Gmünd, at the age of 72.
