= Walther Cloos =

Walther Cloos (born in Darmstadt, Germany 22 June 1900 and died in Ulm, Germany, 30 June 1985) was a pharmacist, alchemist, Anthroposophist, lecturer, researcher, inventor, author and pioneer in anthroposophical pharmacy.

== Life ==
Walther Cloos grew up in Darmstadt, and studied pharmacy at the Stuttgart Technical University. He attended lectures on mineralogy and geology and did practical training in pharmacy in the Spessart region, near Hamburg and in the southern Black Forest.

Joanna Thylmann's reading group introduced him to Rudolf Steiner and Anthroposophy through her reading group. He had already heard Steiner speak at the independent academic course held in Stuttgart in March 1921. He also attended a second course in Darmstadt in July of that year.

After having completed his assistantship in pharmacy, he went to work in a chemical factory in Darmstadt.

In April 1925 Cloos joined the laboratory staff of the Institute of Clinical Medicine in Stuttgart. The center of this group would later become the German Weleda Company. There he started to develop the method of metal distillation that Rudolf Steiner suggested would increase the medical action of metals. Metallic mirror preparations called 'metallicum preparatum' came to play an important role in the medicinal use of metals.

He took interest as well in medicinal plants grown in the Weleda Schwaebisch Gmuend. With the botanist Gerbert Grohmann and many farmers he studied the ideal conditions and best habitats for different medicinal plants and their biodynamic cultivation.

The main focus of his work at Weleda would be the manufacture of medicines made from minerals and metals. Cloos worked out 200 monographs for these medicaments.

In the 1960s and 1970s collaboration developed in Schwabisch Gmuend with Pelikan, Schmiedel, Krueger and Theodor Schwenk. This would be the foundation for Weleda medicines later on. Cloos also kept in close contact with the medical profession which provided opportunities for further collaboration. He was also in contact with the Science Section of the School of Spiritual Science at the Goetheanum. He offered lecture and courses for he workers, farmers, gardeners and students at the Goetheanum.

Cloos was continually invited to give talks to physicians at Lake Hallstatt in Upper Austria. Dr. Franz Bengesser built a house there for small-scale medical meetings in a large room there.

== Works ==
- Die Erde — ein Lebewesen. Beiträge zur Physiologie der Erde (The Earth as a Living Entity — Aspects of Its Physiology) published by Freies Geistesleben in Stuttgart in 1952.
- The Living Earth. The Organic Origin of Rocks and Minerals.
- Kleine Edelsteinkunde. In Hinblick auf die Geschichte der Erde (A Brief Gemology in the Light of Earth History) published by Freies Geistesleben in Stuttgart in 1956. 4 editions.
- Werdende Natur (Evolving Nature) Goetheanum-Bücher Nr. 8. Phil.-Anthr. Verlag, Dornach 1966.
- Vom Arbeiten mit der Werdenden Natur (Working with Evolving Nature) Verlag Die Kommenden, Freiburg 1966.
