= Novopetrovsky =

Novopetrovsky (masculine), Novopetrovskaya (feminine), or Novopetrovskoye (neuter) may refer to:

- Novopetrovskoye, name of the town of Fort-Shevchenko, Kazakhstan before 1857
- Novopetrovskoye, Republic of Bashkortostan, a village (selo) in the Republic of Bashkortostan, Russia
- Novopetrovskoye, name of several other rural localities in Russia

== See also ==
- Novopetrovka
- Novopetrovsk (disambiguation)
- Petrovsky (disambiguation)
