= Petrovsky District =

Petrovsky District may refer to:

- Petrovsky District, Russia, name of several districts in Russia
- Petrovsky District, Donetsk, a city district of Donetsk, Ukraine

== See also ==
- Petrove Raion, a former district of Kirovohrad Oblast, Ukraine
