= Kavalyow =

Kavalyow or Kavaliou (Belarusian: Кавалёў), or Kavalyova, Kavaliova (feminine; Кавалёва), is a common Belarusian surname, an equivalent of the English "Smith" and Russian "Kovalyov" (derived from the Belarusian word kaval, which means blacksmith).

The surname may refer to:

- Aleh Kavalyow (born 1987), Belarusian professional footballer
- Viktoria Kavaliova (born 1994), Belarusian ice dancer
- Yury Kavalyow (born 1993), Belarusian professional footballer
