= Kovalyuk =

Kovalyuk or Kovaliuk (Russian, Ukrainian: Ковалюк), Kavaluk (Belarusian: Кавалюк), Kowaluk (Polish) is a common East Slavic surname, similar to Kovalchuk in origin and usage.

The surname may refer to:

- Siarhiej Kavaluk (born 1980), Belarusian footballer
- Volodymyr Kovalyuk (born 1972), Ukrainian footballer
- Vasyl Kovalyuk (1937–2000), Ukrainian writer
- Dariusz Kowaluk (born 1996), Polish sprinter
