= Sitepu =

Batak surname originating in Indonesia

Sitepu is one of Karo Batak clans originating in North Sumatra, Indonesia. People of this clan bear the clan's name as their surname. Notable people of this clan include:

- Christian Ronaldo Sitepu (born 1986), Indonesian basketball player
- Delia Pratiwi Sitepu (born 1988), Indonesian politician
- Ulung Sitepu (1917-?), Indonesian general and politician
