= Smith and Jones =

Smith and Jones may refer to:

- Smith (surname) and Jones (surname)
- Smith & Jones instant noodles, a brand of instant noodles manufactured and sold in India by Capital Foods Ltd India.

It also may refer to the following television programs:

- Alias Smith and Jones, an American Western television series
- Alas Smith and Jones, a British television sketch comedy show
- "Smith and Jones" (Doctor Who), an episode of the British television series Doctor Who

In fiction, the use of Smith and Jones as a pair of characters is sometimes used to convey a sense of intentional anonymity, as in the cases:

- Agent Smith and Agent Jones from The Matrix
- In the film Men in Black, Will Smith and Tommy Lee Jones portrayed two agents referred to as "Mr. Smith" and "Mr. Jones" in some promotional material
