= Novopetrivka =

Novopetrivka (Ukrainian: Новопетрівка) may refer to the following places in Ukraine:

- Novopetrivka, Shyroke rural hromada, Bashtanka Raion, Mykolaiv Oblast
- Novopetrivka, Vysokopillia settlement hromada, Beryslav Raion, Kherson Oblast

== See also ==
- Novopetrovka (disambiguation), for places with the equivalent Russian-language name
