= Petric (surname) =

Petric is an anglicisated surname from either the Slovene surname Petrič (surname), or the South Slavic surname Petrić, a patronymic of Petar, cognate to Peter. Notable people with the surname include:

- Daniel Petric (born 1991), American murderer
- Faith Petric (1915–2013), American folk musician
- Joseph Petric (born 1952), Canadian musical artist
- Mihai Petric (1923–2005), Moldovan artist
- William Petric (born 2004), Australian swimmer

== See also ==
- Petric (disambiguation)
- Petrić, the South Slavic surname
- Petrič (surname), the Slovene surname
- Petrich (surname)
