= Viktor Kovalenko =

Viktor Kovalenko or Victor Covalenko or variant, may refer to:

- Viktor Kovalenko (footballer) (born 1996), Ukrainian footballer
- Viktor Kovalenko (ice dancer) (born 1991), Uzbek ice dancer
- Victor Kovalenko (born 1950), Ukrainian–Australian sailing coach
- Victor Covalenco (born 1975), Moldovan decathlete

== See also ==
- Kovalenko (surname)
- Victor (disambiguation)
