= Smithers =

Smithers is a surname of English origin. It derives from the Middle English term "smyther", referring to a metalsmith, and is thus related to the common occupational surname Smith. The name Smither is related.

== People ==
- Alan Smithers (born 1938), English educationalist
- Sir Alfred Waldron Smithers (1850–1924), British financier and parliamentarian, after whom the town of Smithers, British Columbia was named.
- Collier Twentyman Smithers (1867–1943), painter
- Don Smithers (born 1933), music historian and musician
- Jan Smithers (born 1949), American actress best known for her role in WKRP in Cincinnati
- Joy Smithers (born 1963), Australian actress
- Leonard Smithers (1861–1907), English publisher and translator
- Nathaniel B. Smithers (1818–1896), American lawyer and politician
- Sir Peter Smithers (1913–2006), British politician
- Reay Smithers (in German) (1907–1987), South African zoologist
- Sir Waldron Smithers (1880–1954), British politician, son of Sir Alfred Waldron Smithers
- William Smithers (1927–2026), American actor

== Fictional characters ==
- Waylon Smithers, Mr. Burns' assistant in The Simpsons
- Smithers, one of Q's assistants in two James Bond films
- Samuel Smithers, also known as Plantman, a supervillain in the Marvel Comics Universe
- Derek Smithers, a character in the Alex Rider series
- Will Smithers, a minor character in The Hitchhiker's Guide to the Galaxy
- Smithers, Hiram Lodge's butler in Archie Comics
- Charlie Smithers, the contestant played by Ronnie Corbett in the spoof version of Mastermind by the Two Ronnies

== See also ==
- List of Old English (Anglo-Saxon) surnames
