= Novopetrovsk =

Novopetrovsk may refer to:

- Novopetrovsk, former name of the town of Aktau, Kazakhstan
- Novopetrovsk-2, former name of the closed urban-type settlement of Voskhod, Moscow Oblast, Russia

== See also ==
- Novopetrovka
- Novopetrovsky (disambiguation)
- Petrovsk (disambiguation)
- Petrovsky (disambiguation)
