= Andrei Kovalenko (disambiguation) =

Andrei Kovalenko (born 1970) is a Russian ice hockey player.

Andrei Kovalenko may also refer to:

- Andrei Kovalenko (Belarusian footballer) (born 1970), Belarusian footballer
- Andrei Kovalenko (Russian footballer) (born 1972), Russian football coach and player
- Andrei Kovalenko (water polo) (born 1970), Australian water polo player and coach
