= Kovach (surname) =

Kovach (Cyrillic: Ковач, meaning blacksmith) is a gender-neutral Slavic surname. Notable people with the surname include:

- Bill Kovach (born 1932), American journalist
- Jim Kovach (born 1956), American entrepreneur, physician, attorney, and football player
- June Kovach (1932–2010), American-born Swiss film director, film editor and concert pianist
- Kelly Kovach Schoenly, American softball coach and former softball player
- Michael Kovach (born 1995), American voice actor
- Nancy Kovack (born 1935), American film and television actress
- Nora Kovach (1931–2009), Hungarian ballerina
- William Kovach (1909–1966), politician from Alberta, Canada

== See also ==
- Kovách, a surname
- Kovač (Ковач), a surname
- Kováč, a surname
