= Schmitzer =

The Austrian surname Schmitzer is related to the surname Schmitz. The Czechized form is Šmicer. It may refer to:

- Jiří Schmitzer, Czech actor
- Karl Schmitzer (1926-2011), Austrian politician, member of National Council (1970-1981)
- Vladimír Šmicer, Czech footballer
