= Šmíd =

Šmíd (feminine Šmídová) is a Czech surname, Czechized form of German surname Schmidt. Notable people include:

- Jaroslav Šmíd, Czech volleyball player
- John Smid, former director of the Memphis, Tennessee ex-gay ministry Love In Action
- Ladislav Šmíd, Czech ice hockey player
- Lenka Šmídová, Czech sailor
- Marie Šmídová (table tennis), Czech table tennis player
- Martin Šmíd, Czech fictitious university student
- Michal Šmíd, Czech footballer
- Miroslav Šmíd, Czech rock climber
- Pavla Šmídová, Czech volleyball player
- Tomáš Šmíd, Czech tennis player
- Zdeněk Šmíd, Czech ice hockey player
