= John Richard Farre =

English physician (1775–1862)

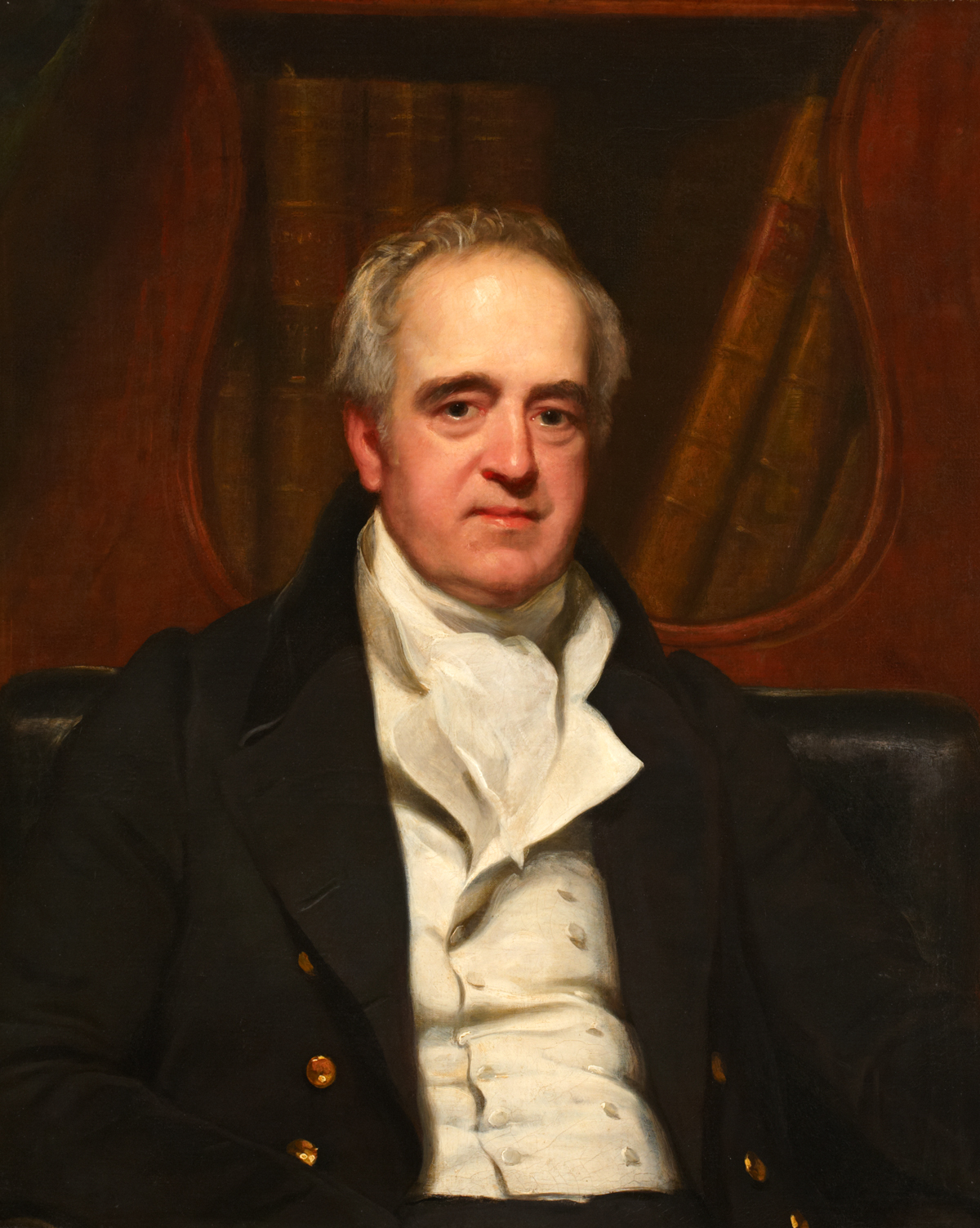
- Farre, date unknown
- Born: 31 January 1775
- Died: 7 May 1862 (aged 87); Islington, Middlesex, England
- Known for: Co-founder of London Infirmary for Diseases of the Eye
- Children: Frederic John Farre, Arthur Farre
- Scientific career
- Fields: Anatomy, ophthalmology
- Institutions: St Thomas' Hospital

John Richard Farre (31 January 1775 – 7 May 1862) was an English physician.

== Early life ==
The son of Richard John Farre, a medical practitioner, he was born on 31 January 1775 in Barbados. After school education in the island he studied medicine under his father, and in 1792 came to England and studied medicine at the school then formed by the united hospitals of St. Thomas's and Guy's. At the end of 1793 he became a member of the corporation of surgeons, and went with Mr. Foster, surgeon to Guy's Hospital, to France in the Earl of Moira's expedition. After the expedition failed he came back to London, and afterwards entered practice in the island of Barbados.

== Career ==
In 1800 he returned to England, studied for two years in Edinburgh, and took the degree of M.D. at Aberdeen on 22 January 1806. He became licentiate of the College of Physicians of London on 31 March 1806, and began practice as a physician. He was one of the founders of the Royal London Ophthalmic Hospital, to which he was physician for fifty years.

His portrait, by Thomas Phillips, R.A., was to be seen in the board-room of the Ophthalmic Hospital in Moorfields, London.

== Works ==
He edited James's book on Arterial and Secondary Haemorrhage in 1805 and John Cunningham Saunders on Diseases of the Eye in 1811. He also edited the Journal of Morbid Anatomy, Ophthalmic Medicine and Pharmaceutical Analysis. He himself wrote The Morbid Anatomy of the Liver, London, 1812–1815, and Pathological Researches on Malformations of the Human Heart, London, 1814. This work contains an account of nearly all the cases recorded in England up to its date, and of several observed by the author. His specimens, with others, illustrative of other parts of morbid anatomy, were preserved in the museum of St. Bartholomew's Hospital, to which they were presented by his sons.

== Family and later life ==
He retired from practice in 1856, died on 7 May 1862, and is buried at Kensal Green. His house was in Charterhouse Square, and he had two sons who attained distinction in medicine, Frederic John Farre and Arthur Farre.

== Notes ==
Attribution

This article incorporates text from a publication now in the public domain: "Farre, John Richard". Dictionary of National Biography. London: Smith, Elder & Co. 1885–1900.
