= Petrovsky District, Russia =

Location of Saratov Oblast in Russia.

Location of Stavropol Krai in Russia

Location of Tambov Oblast in Russia

Petrovsky District is the name of several administrative and municipal districts in Russia. The districts' name generally derives from or is related to the male first name Pyotr.

- Petrovsky District, Saratov Oblast, an administrative and municipal district of Saratov Oblast
- Petrovsky District, Stavropol Krai, an administrative and municipal district of Stavropol Krai
- Petrovsky District, Tambov Oblast, an administrative and municipal district of Tambov Oblast

== See also ==
- Petrovsky (disambiguation)
