= Oleksandr Kovalenko =

Oleksandr Kovalenko may refer to:

- Oleksandr Kovalenko (footballer, born 1974) (born 1974), Ukrainian footballer, goalkeeper
- Oleksandr Kovalenko (footballer) (1976-2010), Ukrainian footballer
- Oleksandr Mykhailovych Kovalenko (1875-1963), Ukrainian political activist, scientist, military officer, writer
- Oleksandr Mykolayovych Kovalenko (1935-2021), Ukrainian economist and politician
- Oleksandr Kovalenko 1996

== See also ==
- Kovalenko
