= Kovačec =

Kovačec is a Croatian surname. Notable people with the surname include:

- August Kovačec (born 1938), Croatian linguist and academician
- Krešo Kovačec (born 1969), German footballer of Croatian origin
