= Delia Pratiwi Sitepu =

Indonesian politician (born 1988)

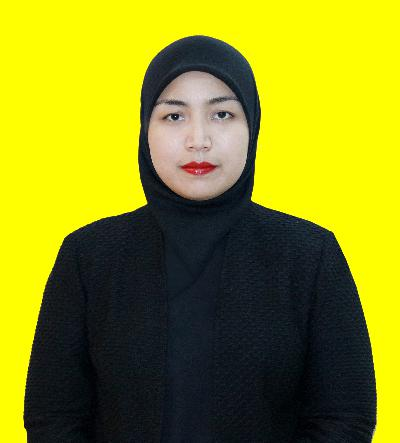
- Sitepu in 2019

Member of the House of Representatives
- Incumbent
- Assumed office 1 October 2024
- Constituency: North Sumatra III

Personal details
- Born: 30 March 1988 (age 38)
- Party: Golkar
- Parent: Ngogesa Sitepu (father)
- Relatives: Rizky Yunanda Sitepu (brother)

Delia Pratiwi Sitepu (born 30 March 1988) is an Indonesian politician serving as a member of the House of Representatives since 2014. She is the daughter of Ngogesa Sitepu and the sister of Rizky Yunanda Sitepu.
