= Novopetrovka, Sharansky District, Republic of Bashkortostan =

Novopetrovka Новопетровка
- Village
- Location within Bashkortostan Location within Russia
- Coordinates: 54°57′N 54°21′E
- Country: Russia
- Region: Bashkortostan
- District: Sharansky District
- Time zone: UTC+5:00

Novopetrovka (Russian: Новопетровка) is a rural locality (a village) in Michurinsky Selsoviet, Sharansky District, Bashkortostan, Russia. The population was 40 as of 2010. There is 1 street.

== Geography ==
Novopetrovka is located 33 km northeast of Sharan (the district's administrative centre) by road. Borisovka is the nearest rural locality.
