= Petrovsky (disambiguation) =

Petrovsky is a surname.

Petrovsky (masculine) or Petrovskaya (feminine) may also refer to:

- Petrovsky Boulevard, Moscow, Russia
- Petrovsky Stadium, St. Petersburg, Russia, a stadium used mainly for football
- Petrovsky Island, St. Petersburg, Russia
- Petrovsky (inhabited locality), various places in Russia, includes places named Petrovskaya
- Petrovsky District, Saratov Oblast, Russia
- Petrovsky District, Stavropol Krai, Russia
- Petrovsky District, Tambov Oblast, Russia
- Petrovsky District, Donetsk, a city district of Donetsk, Ukraine
- Petrovskaya Tower, part of the Moscow Kremlin
- 5319 Petrovskaya, an asteroid

== See also ==
- Petrovsk (disambiguation)
- Novopetrovsk (disambiguation)
- Novopetrovsky (disambiguation)
