= Novopetrovskoye, Republic of Bashkortostan =

Novopetrovskoye Новопетровское
- Selo
- Location within Bashkortostan Location within Russia
- Coordinates: 52°13′12″N 56°33′36″E
- Country: Russia
- Region: Bashkortostan
- District: Zianchurinsky District
- Time zone: UTC+5:00

Novopetrovskoye (Russian: Новопетро́вское) is a village (selo) in Zianchurinsky District of the Republic of Bashkortostan, Russia, located north of the Russian border with Kazakhstan and near Orsk. The population is small; some estimates suggest only a few hundred residents, around 700 according to unofficial figures. The village mainly relies on traditional rural activities like farming and raising livestock, which is common in villages across Bashkortostan.
