= Schmidl =

Schmidl is a German surname. Notable people with the surname include:

- Bernard Schmidl, Paralympic volleyball player for Germany
- Marianne Schmidl (1890–1942), Austrian ethnologist
- Peter Schmidl (1941–2025), Austrian classical clarinetist
- Ulrich Schmidl (1510–1579), German Landsknecht, conquistador, explorer, chronicler and councilman

== See also ==
- Schmiedel
- Dovid Schmidel
