= Joan Albert Farré Santuré =

Andorran politician

Joan Albert Farré Santuré (born 1968) is an Andorran politician. He is a member of the Liberal Party of Andorra. He was a member of the General Council of Andorra from 2001 to 2009.
