= List of taxonomic authorities named Smith =

The surname Smith, as a taxonomic authority, may refer to any of a number of people across a variety of disciplines. Determining which person is intended generally requires looking at initials in addition to the surname, and in some cases to the field and dates for which the authority is cited.

Generally

- Andrew Smith (zoologist) (A. Smith, 1797–1872), a Scottish surgeon, naturalist, explorer and zoologist
- C. Lavett Smith
- Edgar Albert Smith (E. A. Smith, 1847–1916), zoologist and malacologist. See also other malacologists named Smith
- Erwin Frink Smith (1854–1927), a bacteriologist
- Hobart Muir Smith (H. M. Smith, 1912–2013), an American herpetologist
- Hugh McCormick Smith (1865–1941), an American ichthyologist
- James Leonard Brierley Smith (Smith, JLB, 1897–1968), a South African ichthyologist
- Jane E. Smith, a dipterist
- John Bernhardt Smith (1858–1912), an American entomologist
- Malcolm Arthur Smith (1875–1958), a British herpetologist
- Rosemary Margaret Smith (1933–2004), a Scottish botanist
- Sidney Irving Smith (1843–1926), an American malacologist
- William Leo Smith

Mycologists and lichenologists

- A.M. Smith (taxonomic authority) (A.M.Sm.bis)
- Alexander Hanchett Smith (A.H.Sm., 1904–1986), an American mycologist
- Annie Lorrain Smith (A.L.Sm., 1854–1937), a British lichenologist
- Brendan J. Smith (B.J.Sm.)
- Charles Leonard Smith (C.L.Sm.)
- Clayton Orville Smith (C.O.Sm.)
- Clifford W. Smith (C.W.Sm., born 1938), a lichenologist and botanist
- Donald J. Smith (D.J.Sm.)
- Elizabeth Hight Smith (E.H.Sm.)
- Erwin Frink Smith (E.F.Sm., 1854–1927), a bacteriologist
- F.E.V. Smith (F.E.V.Sm.)
- G.S. Smith (G.S.Sm.)
- Gavin J.D. Smith (G.J.D.Sm.)
- George Smith (mycologist) (G.Sm., 1895–1967), a mycologist
- Helen Vandervort Smith (H.V.Sm.)
- Hendrik Smith (H.Sm.ter)
- J.M.B. Smith (J.M.B.Sm.)
- James Edward Smith (Sm., 1759–1828), an English botanist and founder of the Linnean Society
- Jeffery Drew Smith (J.D.Sm.)
- John Smith (botanist) (J.Sm. Dalry, 1798–1888), a botanist
- Kenneth Manley Smith (K.M.Sm.)
- Marion Ashton Smith (M.A.Sm.)
- Matthew E. Smith (M.E.Sm.)
- Maudy Th. Smith (M.T.Sm.)
- Paul Hamilton Smith (P.H.Sm.)
- Peter R. Smith (P.R.Sm.)
- R.B. Smith (taxonomic authority) (R.B.Sm.)
- R.J. Smith (R.J.Sm.)
- Ralph Elliott Smith (Eliot) (R.E.Sm.)
- Ronald I. Lewis Smith (R.I.L.Sm.)
- Selena Y. Smith (S.Y.Sm.), a botanist
- Stanley Jay Smith (S.J.Sm.)
- William Gardner Smith (Wm.G.Sm.)
- Worthington George Smith (W.G.Sm., 1835–1917), an English cartoonist and illustrator, archaeologist, plant pathologist and mycologist

== See also ==
- Smith (surname)
- Category: Taxonomists
