= Frederic John Farre =

English physician (1804–1886)

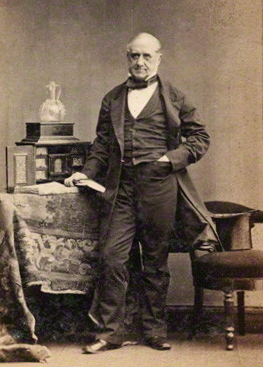
Farre in 1861

Frederic John Farre (16 December 1804 – 9 November 1886) was an English physician.

== Life ==
Farre was the second son of John Richard Farre, M.D. He was born in Charterhouse Square, London, and educated at the Charterhouse School, where he was a gold medallist in 1821, and captain in 1822. Having obtained a foundation scholarship at St. John's College, Cambridge, he graduated BA as thirty-second wrangler in 1827. After studying medicine at St. Bartholomew's Hospital, London, he graduated M.A. in 1830, and M.D. in 1837.

In 1831 he was appointed lecturer in botany at St. Bartholomew's, and in 1854 lecturer in medicine, holding the latter office till 1876. On 23 July 1836 he was elected assistant physician to St. Bartholomew's, and in 1854 full physician. From 1843 till his death he was physician at the Royal London Ophthalmic Hospital. He was long intimately connected with the College of Physicians, having been elected a fellow in 1838, and having held the offices of censor in 1841, 1842, and 1854, lecturer on materia medica 1843–5, councillor 1846–8 and 1866–7, examiner 1861–2 and 1866–7, treasurer 1868–83, and vice-president in 1885. Before he resigned the office of treasurer he presented the college with a copious manuscript history of its proceedings, compiled by himself.

Farre was one of the editors of the first 'British Pharmacopœia,’ published by the General Medical Council (1864), and also joined in editing an abridgment of Pereira's 'Materia Medica,’ published in 1865; greatly enlarged editions appeared in 1872 and 1874. He also published a paper on the 'Treatment of Acute Pericarditis with Opium' in the 'St. Bartholomew's Hospital Reports' for 1866, which recommends the disuse of the injurious mercurial treatment then in fashion.

In 1870 he reached the limit of age allowed to physicians at St. Bartholomew's, and retired from active work, though still attending the College of Physicians. He was a successful lecturer and colloquial teacher, being clear and simple in style, and agreeable in manner. He had considerable private practice for many years in Montague Street, Russell Square. He died in Kensington on 9 November 1886, in his eighty-second year. He married Miss Julia Lewis in 1848, by whom he had two daughters, who survived him.
