= Schmiedel =

Schmiedel and Schmiedl are German surnames. Schmiedl also appears in Czech and Slovak languages (feminine: Schmiedlová). Notable people with the surname include:

- Anna Karolína Schmiedlová (born 1994), Slovak tennis player
- Friedrich Schmiedl (1902–1994), Austrian rocket designer
- Kristína Schmiedlová (born 1997), Slovak tennis player
- Oskar Schmiedel (1887–1959), pharmacist and anthroposophist
- Paul Wilhelm Schmiedel (1851–1935), German theologian
- Paulina Schmiedel (born 1993), German swimmer

== See also ==
- Schmidl
- Dovid Schmidel
