= De Smedt =

De Smedt is a Dutch occupational surname. It is East and West Flemish for "the smith". De Smedt is common in East Flanders, while the agglutinated form Desmedt is primarily used in West Flanders. People with this name include:

- Bill DeSmedt (born 1943), American science fiction author
- Charles De Smedt (1833–1911), Belgian Jesuit priest and hagiographer
- Christine De Smedt (born 1963), Belgian dancer and choreographer
- Eline De Smedt (born 1998), Belgian acrobatic gymnast
- Felix De Smedt (1923–2012), Belgian judoka and judoka trainer
- Jean-Édouard Desmedt (1926–2009), Belgian neurophysiologist
- Julien De Smedt (born 1975), Belgian architect in Denmark
- Larry Desmedt (1949–2004), American motorcycle builder and artist, stunt rider, and biker
- Yvo G. Desmedt (born 1956), Belgian-born American cryptographer

== See also ==
- De Smet (surname), more common spelling of the surname
