= Andrei Kovalenko (Russian footballer) =

Russian footballer and coach

Personal information
- Full name: Andrei Vladimirovich Kovalenko
- Date of birth: 4 January 1972 (age 54)
- Place of birth: Vozhega, Volgograd Oblast, Russian SFSR
- Height: 1.82 m (6 ft 0 in)
- Position: Goalkeeper

Team information
- Current team: FC Dynamo Kirov (GK coach)

Youth career
- FShM Moscow

Senior career*
Years	Team	Apps	(Gls)
1990	FC Zvezda Moscow	5	(0)
1990–1992	FC Volgar Astrakhan	75	(0)
1993	FC Asmaral Moscow	3	(0)
1993–2002	FC Volgar-Gazprom Astrakhan	256	(0)
2003	FC KAMAZ Naberezhnye Chelny	3	(0)
2003	FC Neftekhimik Nizhnekamsk	15	(0)
2004–2006	FC Volgar-Gazprom Astrakhan	61	(0)

Managerial career
- 2008–2018: FC Volgar Astrakhan (GK coach)
- 2018–2019: FC Syzran-2003 (GK coach)
- 2019: FC Mashuk-KMV Pyatigorsk (assistant)
- 2021–2023: FC Veles Moscow (GK coach)
- 2023–: FC Dynamo Kirov (GK coach)
- * Club domestic league appearances and goals

Andrei Vladimirovich Kovalenko (Russian: Андрей Владимирович Коваленко; born 4 January 1972) is a Russian professional football coach and a former player. He is an goalkeepers coach for FC Dynamo Kirov.
