= Petrovsk (inhabited locality) =

Petrovsk (Russian: Петровск) is the name of several inhabited localities in Russia.

== Modern localities ==
Urban localities

- Petrovsk, Saratov Oblast, a town in Saratov Oblast

Rural localities

- Petrovsk, Bryansk Oblast, a village in Semyachkovsky Rural Administrative Okrug of Trubchevsky District in Bryansk Oblast; 52°35′N 33°34′E
- Petrovsk, Irkutsk Oblast, a village in Tulunsky District of Irkutsk Oblast
- Petrovsk, Kozelsky District, Kaluga Oblast, a village in Kozelsky District of Kaluga Oblast
- Petrovsk, Medynsky District, Kaluga Oblast, a village in Medynsky District of Kaluga Oblast
- Petrovsk, Pskov Oblast, a village in Pechorsky District of Pskov Oblast
- Petrovsk, Samara Oblast, a settlement in Chelno-Vershinsky District of Samara Oblast
- Petrovsk, Tomsk Oblast, a village in Pervomaysky District of Tomsk Oblast

== Alternative names ==
- Petrovsk, alternative name of Bolshoye Petrovskoye, a village in Teryayevskoye Rural Settlement of Volokolamsky District in Moscow Oblast; 56°8′N 36°9′E
- Petrovsk, alternative name of Petrovskoye, a selo in Semisolinsky Rural Okrug of Morkinsky District in the Mari El Republic; 56°33′N 49°15′E

== See also ==
- Petrovsky (inhabited locality), several inhabited localities in Russia
- Petrovsk-Zabaykalsky (town), a town in Zabaykalsky Krai, Russia
