= Yuriy Kovalenko (staff sergeant) =

Ukrainian scientist historian and archaeologist

- Born: Yuriy Oleksandrovich Kovalenko; 22 March 1966; Nekrasove, Hlukhiv Raion, Sumy Oblast, Ukrainian SSR, USSR
- Died: 14 March 2023 (aged 56); Kuzmyne, Kreminna urban hromada, Sievierodonetsk Raion, Luhansk Oblast, Ukraine
- Military career
- Allegiance: Ukraine
- Branch: Ukrainian Ground Forces
- Rank: Staff sergeant
- Conflicts: Russo-Ukrainian War
- Awards: Order For Courage, 3rd class

Yuriy Oleksandrovich Kovalenko (Ukrainian: Юрій Олександрович Коваленко; 22 March 1966 – 14 March 2023) was a Ukrainian scientist, archaeologist, local historian, teacher, musician, and staff sergeant of the Armed Forces of Ukraine.

== Biography ==
Kovalenko was born in Nekrasove Hlukhiv Raion Sumy Oblast. First, he got a degree in electricity, then he studied at the Hlukhiv National Pedagogical University of Oleksandr Dovzhenko, where he studied preschool pedagogy and psychology. As an adult, he studied at the history faculty of Taras Shevchenko National University of Kyiv. After serving in the Soviet army (in particular, he served two years in the Soviet army on the territory of Poland), in 1987 he joined an archaeological expedition working in Kyiv on Podil. Since 1988, he has been engaged in search activities. In 1992–1999 he served in the Armed Forces of Ukraine. Since 1999, he held the position of head of the research department of the National Reserve "Hluhiv". A scientist and a practicing archaeologist, since 2005 he has participated in Baturin's archaeological expeditions. Actively researched the past of Hlukhiv, organizing large-scale archaeological excavations. With the beginning of the war in the east of Ukraine in 2014, as a military archaeologist, he participated in the humanitarian mission "Black Tulip".

Since December 2020, Yuriy Kovalenko has been in the ranks of the Armed Forces of Ukraine and participated in the fighting for Avdiivka as part of the 58th Motorized Brigade.

While on military service in May 2021, he defended his PhD thesis on the topic "Historical topography of the Hlukhiv period of the Middle Ages and early modern times". Yuriy Kovalenko is the author of more than 70 scientific articles.

In the first hours of the Russian invasion of Ukraine on 24 February 2022, he participated in the battles for Hlukhiv. Then, in February–March 2022, he took part in military operations in the Brovary direction and in the Chernihiv Oblast. After the liberation of Chernihiv Oblast, he was treated in a hospital for some time. At the same time, he was engaged in volunteering: he negotiated the purchase of cars for his brigade, he drove cars himself. Then he worked in the military, but soon returned to the front again – first to the south, later to the east, where he fought in the hottest points of the war. He served as a military sniper.

He died on 14 March 2023 in the course of fierce fighting near the village of Kuzmyne Kreminna urban hromada, Sievierodonetsk Raion, Luhansk Oblast.
