= Seppälä =

Seppälä is a Finnish surname and toponym derived from the occupation of blacksmith ("seppä").

== People ==
- Arttu Seppälä (born 1987), football player
- Eino Seppälä (1896–1968), runner
- Henkka Seppälä (born 1980), bass guitarist
- Hanna-Maria Seppälä (born 1984), swimmer
- Ilpo Seppälä (born 1953), wrestler
- Jenae Seppälä (born 1986), American football player
- Leonhard Seppälä (1877–1967), Norwegian-American Sled dog musher
- Matti Seppälä (1941–2020), geomorphologist and geographer
- Pete Seppälä (born 1978), singer
- Tuomas Seppälä, guitarist

== Other ==
- Seppälä, a Finnish clothing store chain established in 1930. It declared bankruptcy on September 15, 2017
