= Seppänen =

Seppänen is a Finnish surname derived from the occupation of blacksmith ("seppä"). Notable people with the surname include:

- Elias Seppänen (born 2003), Finnish racing driver
- Ensio Seppänen (1924–2008), Finnish sculptor and professor
- Esko Seppänen (1946–2025), Finnish politician
- Iiro Seppänen (born 1975), Finnish producer, director and author
- Sara Seppänen (born 1982), Finnish politician
- Timo Seppänen (born 1987), Finnish ice hockey player
- Tytti Seppänen (born 1980), Finnish politician
