= Karl Schmitzer =

Austrian politician (1926 - 2011)

Karl Schmitzer (April 22, 1926, in Afing (Lower Austria) – October 19, 2011, in St. Pölten) was an Austrian politician, member of National Council (1970–1981).
