= Jaroslav Šmíd =

Czech volleyball player (born 1955)

Personal information
- Nationality: Czech
- Born: 10 November 1955; Karlovy Vary, Czechoslovakia
- Died: 25 November 2020 (aged 65)

Sport
- Sport: Volleyball

Jaroslav Šmíd (10 November 1955 – 25 November 2020) was a Czech volleyball player. He competed in the men's tournament at the 1980 Summer Olympics.
