= Lefeuvre =

Lefeuvre is a French surname. Notable people with the surname include:

- Ian LeFeuvre, Canadian musician
- Louis-Albert Lefeuvre (1845–1924), French sculptor
- René Lefeuvre (1902–1988), French Luxemburgist

== See also ==
- LeFeuvre Scarp, elevation in Antarctica
- Ordish–Lefeuvre system of cable-stayed bridge design
