= Schmieden =

The German-language surname Schmieden or its nobility form von Schmieden (literally meaning "of smiths") may refer to:

- Schmieden family
  - Werner von Schmieden (1892-1979), German diplomat
- Heino Schmieden German architect
- Viktor Schmieden German surgeon
