= Kuźniar =

Kuźniar is a Polish-language surname of unclear origin. There is no such word in Polish dictionaries. Polish terms for the occupation of blacksmith derived from the word kuźnia ("smithy") are kuźnik and kuźniak. Archaic feminine forms (still used colloquially): Kuźniarowa (by husband), Kuźniarówna (by father. There are also numerous dialectal variants, usually with small numbers of bearers. Notable people with this surname include:

- Jarosław Kuźniar (born 1978), Polish television and radio presenter
- Zdzisław Kuźniar (born 1931), Polish theater, film and television actor
