= Smith E. Lane =

American politician and government official (1829–1909)

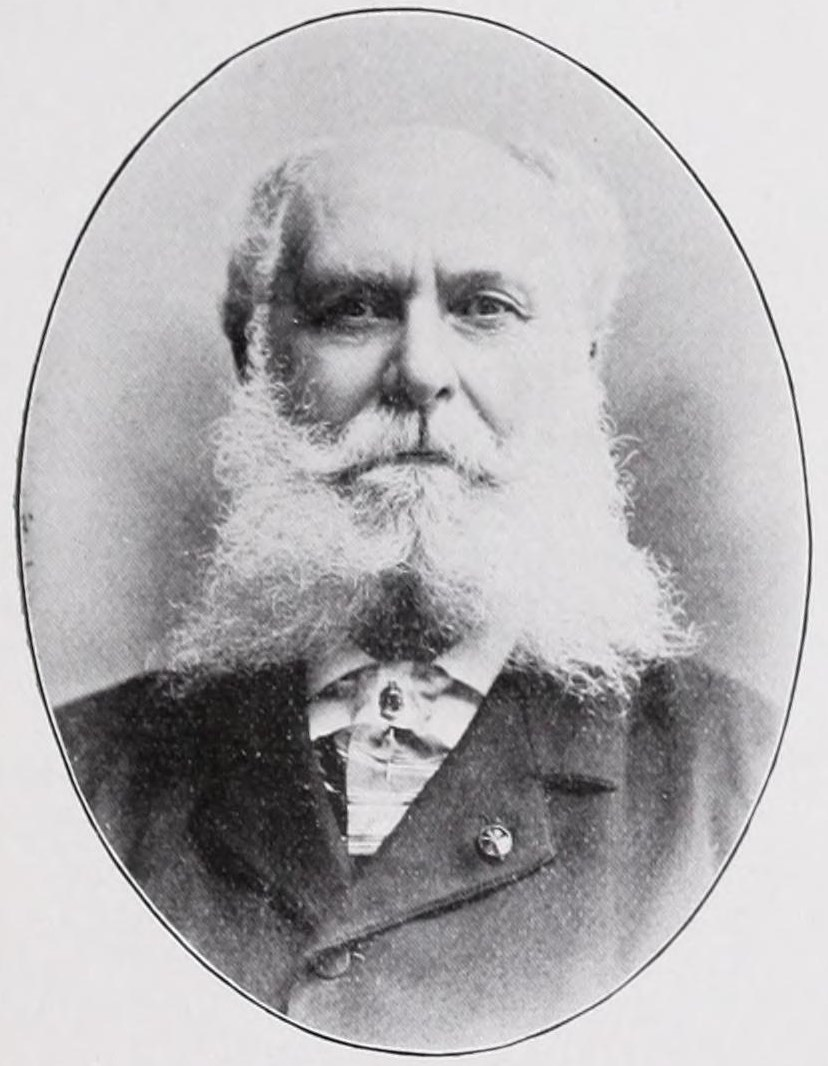

Smith Edward Lane (July 22, 1829 – February 1, 1909) was appointed commissioner of the New York City Department of Parks and Recreation in 1880.

== Biography ==
Smith E. Lane was born in New York on July 22, 1829.

He entered New York University at age 14, and graduated in 1848. He was admitted to the bar in 1852, and practiced as a lawyer.

He was appointed commissioner of the New York City Department of Parks and Recreation by Smith Ely Jr. in 1880. He died in poverty at his apartment at 227 West Sixty-eighth Street in Manhattan on February 1, 1909.
