= Oleksii Kovalenko =

Ukrainian military personnel (1981–2022)

- Олексій Олександрович Коваленко
- Born: 8 February 1981; Malokaterynivka, Zaporizhzhia Oblast, Ukrainian SSR, Soviet Union
- Died: March 22, 2022 (aged 41); Izium, Kharkiv Oblast, Ukraine
- Burial place: Starokostiantyniv
- Alma mater: Kharkiv National Air Force University of Ukraine
- Children: 2
- Military career
- Branch: Ukrainian Air Force
- Service years: 2003–2022
- Rank: Major
- Unit: 7th Tactical Aviation Brigade
- Awards: Hero of Ukraine, Order For Courage

Oleksii Oleksandrovych Kovalenko (Ukrainian: Олексій Олександрович Коваленко; 8 February 1981 – 22 March 2022) was a major, a first class pilot of a frontline bomber Su-24M, and the head of the flight safety service of the 7th Tactical Aviation Brigade of the Air Force of the Armed Forces of Ukraine. He distinguished himself during the Russian invasion of Ukraine. He was posthumously awarded the title of Hero of Ukraine in 2023.

== Biography ==
He was born in the village of Malokaterynivka in Zaporizhzhia region and was raised by his grandmother, as his mother died young of cancer.

In 2003, he graduated from the Kharkiv National Air Force University of Ukraine with a degree in "aircraft flight exploitation and combat application".

To further his military service, he was assigned to the 7th Tactical Aviation Brigade "Petro Franko" as a senior navigator.

During his time in the 7th brigade, he held various positions, including senior navigator of the aviation unit of the aviation squadron, senior pilot of the aviation unit of the military unit, senior pilot of the aviation unit of the aviation squadron of the military unit, deputy commander of the aviation squadron for educational work, deputy commander of the squadron for personnel work of the aviation squadron, deputy commander of the squadron for moral and psychological support of the aviation squadron, commander of the aviation unit of the aviation squadron, and head of the flight safety service.

In 2014, at the beginning of the war, he participated in the Joint Forces Operation where he flew many combat missions.

Kovalenko received numerous awards for his high performance and professional skills. Together with his navigator, they won several times as the best crew at the aviation training events.

During the full-scale Russian invasion, he defended the skies of Kyiv, Sumy, Chernihiv, Kharkiv, and made more than 12 combat flights.

He died on 22 March 2022, as a result of his plane being shot down while carrying out a combat mission to strike a column of enemy troops and military equipment in the area of Izium in Kharkiv Oblast.

On 25 September 2022, after the liberation of Izium, the family was able to bury him in Starokostiantyniv.

He had been awarded numerous honors by the Ministry of Defense of Ukraine.

== Awards ==
- The title of Hero of Ukraine with the order of the Gold Star (26 February 2023, posthumously) – for personal bravery and heroism demonstrated in defense of the state sovereignty and territorial integrity of Ukraine, dedicated service to the Ukrainian people.
- The Order For Courage of the II degree (7 July 2022, posthumously) – for personal bravery and selfless actions demonstrated in defense of the state sovereignty and territorial integrity of Ukraine, faithfulness to the military oath.
- The Order For Courage of the III degree (25 March 2022) – for personal bravery and selfless actions demonstrated in defense of the state sovereignty and territorial integrity of Ukraine, faithfulness to the military oath.

== Honoring ==
In the courtyard of the family's home in the aviation town where his family live, Oleksiy's wife installed a memorial bench with his name and set up a gazebo.

== Family ==
He is survived by his wife and two children – a son and a daughter.
