= Petrovsk-Zabaykalsky =

Petrovsk-Zabaykalsky may refer to:

- Petrovsk-Zabaykalsky District, a district of Zabaykalsky Krai, Russia
- Petrovsk-Zabaykalsky (town), a town in Zabaykalsky Krai, Russia
  - Petrovsk-Zabaykalsky Urban Okrug, the municipal formation which this town is incorporated as
