= Miodrag Kovačić =

Serbian weightlifter

Miodrag Kovačić (Serbian: Мидораг Ковачић; born 31 July 1965) is a Serbian weightlifter. He competed at the 1996 Summer Olympics in Atlanta in Men's Featherweight. Kovačić placed 34th out of 36 competitors, lifting a total of 247.5 kg. He ranks 2470 in the All Time Weightlifter Rankings.
