= Schmidtke =

Schmidtke is a German surname.

== Geographical distribution ==
As of 2014, 78.5% of all known bearers of the surname Schmidtke were residents of Germany, 11.7% of the United States, 2.5% of Canada, 1.9% of Poland, 1.5% of Brazil and 1.2% of Australia.

In Germany, the frequency of the surname was higher than national average in the following states:

1. Schleswig-Holstein (1:2,312)
2. Mecklenburg-Vorpommern (1:3,037)
3. Brandenburg (1:3,186)
4. Hamburg (1:3,940)
5. Saxony-Anhalt (1:4,903)
6. Lower Saxony (1:4,946)
7. Bremen (1:5,030)
8. North Rhine-Westphalia (1:5,253)

== People ==
- Alfred Schmidtke (1870s–?) German New Testament researcher
- Claudia Schmidtke (born 1966), German cardiologist and politician
- Fredy Schmidtke (1961–2017), German track cyclist
- Heinz Schmidtke (1925–2013), German ergonomist
- Ned Schmidtke (born 1942), American film and television actor
- Rosemarie Schmidtke, German rower
- Sabine Schmidtke, Islamic scholar from Germany
