= Boris Kovatchev =

- Education: MS in Mathematics; PhD in Mathematics
- Alma mater: Sofia University
- Occupations: Professor; Researcher
- Employer: University of Virginia
- Known for: Founding director of the UVA Center for Diabetes Technology; Principal investigator of the JDRF Artificial Pancreas Project

Boris Petrov Kovatchev is a professor at the University of Virginia where he is the founding Director of the UVA Center for Diabetes Technology, and a principal investigator of the JDRF Artificial Pancreas Project.

== Education ==
He received an MS in Mathematics from Sofia University in Bulgaria where he also completed his PhD in Mathematics in 1989.

== Research ==
He and his team of more than 25 investigators at UVA have been working on the integration of continuous glucose monitors and insulin pumps to create a closed-loop system requiring little or no intervention by the user. He holds 38 patents for technology related to diabetes and blood glucose monitoring.

== Recognition ==
In 2008, he became the first mathematician to be awarded the International Diabetes Technology Leadership Award, presented by the Diabetes Technology Society. In 2013, he was awarded the prestigious Gerold & Kayla Grodsky Basic Research Scientist Award for leadership and innovation in type 1 diabetes.

He has an h-index of 100 according to Google Scholar.
