= Małgorzata Kowalczyk =

Polish documentary film director

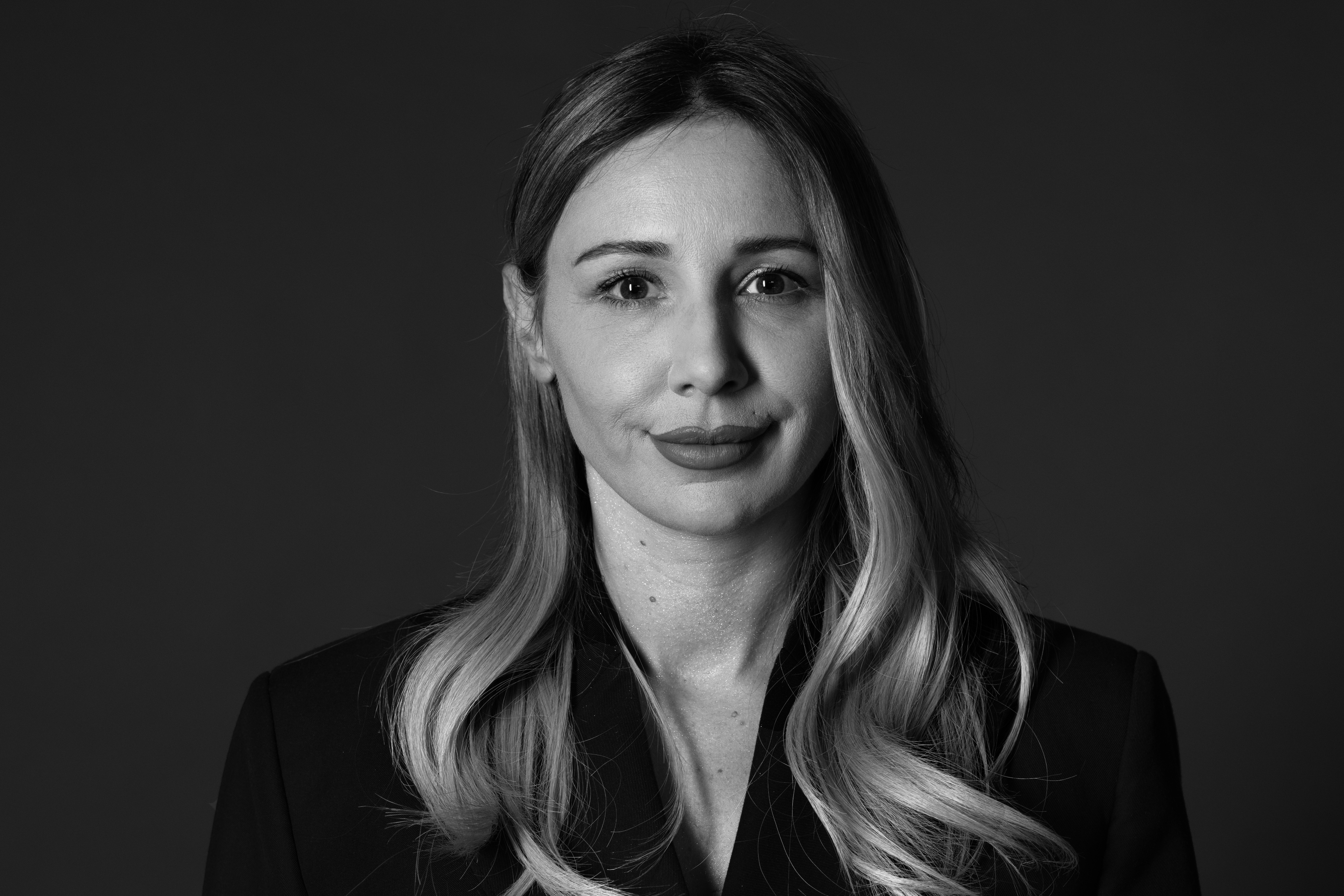
- Małgorzata Kowalczyk
- Born: Małgorzata Kowalczyk
- Occupation: Director
- Years active: 2019–present

Małgorzata Kowalczyk is a Polish documentary film director, best known for her works Fenomen (2023), a film about Jerzy Owsiak, and Don't F*** with Liroy (2025), a documentary on Piotr "Liroy" Marzec.

== Biography ==
Kowalczyk graduated from the University of Warsaw, Faculty of Political Science and International Studies, where she earned her master's degree in journalism and social communication.

She began her career as an investigative journalist for TVN24, later working as a reporter for TVN, where she produced numerous reports.

In 2019, she shifted her career toward documentary filmmaking. In preparation for this new path, she collaborated with directors such as John Boorman and Scott Hillier, co-creator of the Oscar-winning documentary Twin Towers.

== Filmography ==
=== Early work ===
Kowalczyk debuted with the short documentary Warm for Winter, highlighting the growing issue of homelessness in Dublin. The film portrays a simple act of kindness that sparked a media storm and divided public opinion. It was created as part of the Film Network Ireland 20/20 – a 48-hour project aimed at raising awareness of homelessness in Ireland. The film won the main award in the competition. It premiered publicly on 29 February 2020 at the Dublin International Film Festival.

=== Fenomen (2023) ===
A full-length documentary about Jerzy Owsiak and the history of the Great Orchestra of Christmas Charity (WOŚP). The film premiered in cinemas on 20 January 2023 and was nominated for the 2024 Polish Film Award "Orły" for Best Documentary Feature. It aired on TVN and TVN 7, and was made available on Netflix and Player.

=== Don't F*** with Liroy (2025) ===
A documentary depicting the life of Piotr "Liroy" Marzec – a pioneer of Polish hip hop, music producer, entrepreneur, and politician. The film premiered on 21 March 2025. Pre-release screenings took place in Warsaw and Kielce.

The documentary presents the artist's biography – from childhood in Kielce, through his music career, to political activity, with a focus on his role in the legalization of medical marijuana in Poland. Ice-T makes a guest appearance, stating: "Liroy is OG. Don’t fuck with him".
