= Ulrich Kowalczyk =

German football manager (born 1964)

Personal information
- Full name: Ulrich Peter Kowalczyk
- Date of birth: 28 March 1964 (age 62)
- Place of birth: Bavaria, Germany

Managerial career
- Years: Team
- Santa Bárbara
- 2000: Carmelita
- 2007–2009: Mérida B
- 2009–2022: Corsarios de Campeche

Ulrich Peter Kowalczyk (born 28 March 1964) is a German football manager who managed Corsarios de Campeche.

== Career ==
In 1994, Kowalczyk left Venezuela for Costa Rica after working in the tourist industry with the intention of becoming a manager.

In 2000, Kowalczyk was appointed manager of Costa Rican top flight side Carmelita after managing Santa Bárbara in the Costa Rican top flight. Between 2009 and 2022 he managed Mexican fourth division club Corsarios de Campeche.
