= Szmidt =

Szmidt and Szmit are Polish-language transliterations of the German surname Schmidt. They may refer to:

Szmidt

- Jadwiga Szmidt (1889 – 1940), Polish-Russian physicist
- John Szmidt, British musician from A Genuine Freakshow band
- Józef Szmidt (born 1935), Polish athlete (triple jump world record holder 1960–68)
- Peter Szmidt (born 1961), Canadian swimmer
- Piotr Szmidt, Polish rapper and record producer better known as Ten Typ Mes
- Robert J. Szmidt (born 1962), Polish science fiction and fantasy writer, translator and journalist
- Tomasz Szmidt (born 1971), Polish field hockey player

Szmit

- Artur Szmit, former bass guitarist of Polish streetpunk band The Analogs
