= Smither =

Smither is a surname. People so named include:

- Bob Smither (born 1944), Libertarian Party Texas congressional candidate
- Chris Smither (born 1944), American folk-blues singer, guitarist, and songwriter
- Denise Orme, stage name of Jessie Smither (1885–1960), English music hall singer, actress and musician
- Elizabeth Smither (born 1941), New Zealand poet and writer
- Henry Smither (1873–1930), US Army officer and football coach
- James Smither FRIBA (1833–1910), Irish architect and Ceylonese public servant
- Michael Smither (born 1939), New Zealand painter and composer, husband of Elizabeth Smither

== Fictional characters ==
- Dale Smither, from the television series Heroes

== See also ==
- Smithers (name)
