= Kovačev =

Kovačev (Cyrillic: Ковачев) is a Croatian, Serbian and Macedonian surname. Notable people with the surname include:

- Josif Kovačev (1839–1898)
- Branislav Lala Kovačev (1939–2012)

== See also ==
- Kovachev, surname
