= Sergey Kovalenko =

Sergey Kovalenko may refer to:

- Sergei Kovalenko (1947–2002), Soviet basketball player
- Sergei Kovalenko (sport shooter) (born 1970), Russian sport shooter
- Sergey Kovalenko (wrestler) (born 1976), Russian wrestler
- Serhiy Kovalenko (born 1984), Ukrainian footballer
- Siarhei Kavalenka (born 1975), Belarusian activist
