= Petrič (surname) =

Petrič is a Slovene surname, a patronymic of Peter. Notable people with the name include:

- Borut Petrič (born 1961), Yugoslav swimmer
- Darjan Petrič (born 1964), Yugoslav freestyle swimmer
- Dušan Petrič (1916–1964), Slovene painter and graphic designer
- Ernest Petrič (born 1936), Slovenian judge and diplomat
- Joseph Petrič (born 1952), Canadian musical artist
- Luka Petrič (born 1984), Slovenian badminton player

== See also ==
- Petrič (disambiguation)
- Petrić, the South Slavic surname
- Petric (surname), the anglicisated surname
- Petrich (surname)
