= Novopetrovka, Blagoveshchensky District, Amur Oblast =

Village in Russia

Coordinates: 50.78°N 127.75°E

Novopetrovka (Russian: Новопетро́вка) is a village (selo) in Blagoveshchensky District of Amur Oblast, Russia, located on the west bank of the Zeya River (a tributary of the Amur River, which forms the Russian border with the Chinese province of Heilongjiang).
