= Kowalczyk =

Kowalczyk (Polish pronunciation: [kɔˈvalt͡ʂɨk]) is the fifth most common surname in Poland (98,739 people in 2009). In January 2026, the Polish register PESEL listed 48,264 women and 46,994 men with the surname. The name comes from the word 'blacksmith'.

Notable people with the surname include:

- Adam Kowalczyk (born 1975), American musician, brother of Ed Kowalczyk
- Antoine Kowalczyk, (1866–1947), Polish-Canadian, Servant of God
- August Kowalczyk (1921–2012), Polish actor
- Bartosz Kowalczyk (born 1996), Polish handball player
- Bogdan Kowalczyk (born 1946), Polish handball player
- Ed Kowalczyk (born 1971), American rock singer, brother of Adam Kowalczyk
- Henryk Kowalczyk (born 1956), Polish politician
- Ignace Kowalczyk (1913–1996), German-French footballer
- Jacek Kowalczyk (born 1981), Polish footballer
- Jan Kowalczyk (1941–2020), Polish show jumping champion
- Jarosław Kowalczyk (born 1989), Polish cyclist
- Józef Kowalczyk (1938–2025), Polish clergyman, archbishop of Gniezno
- Justyna Kowalczyk (born 1983), Polish cross-country skier
- Kamil Kowalczyk, Polish footballer
- Maciej Kowalczyk (born 1977), Polish footballer
- Małgorzata Kowalczyk, Polish documentary film director
- Marcin Kowalczyk (born 1985), Polish footballer
- Marek Kowalczyk, Polish footballer
- Mariano Kowalczyk (born 1971), Argentine rower
- Mateusz Kowalczyk (tennis) (born 1987), Polish tennis player
- Mateusz Kowalczyk (footballer) (born 2004), Polish tennis player
- Sebastian Kowalczyk (born 1998), Polish footballer
- Tod Kowalczyk (born 1966), American college basketball coach
- Ulrich Kowalczyk, German football manager
- Walt Kowalczyk (1935–2018), American football player in the National Football League
- Wojciech Kowalczyk (born 1972), Polish footballer
- Kowalczyk brothers (1937–2017), Polish scientists who planted a bomb at the University of Opole in 1971

== Fictional chaacters ==
- Sugar Kowalczyk, 1959 American crime comedy Some Like It Hot character

== See also ==
- Mount Kowalczyk, a mountain in Antarctica
