= Smed =

Smed is a Danish occupational surname meaning "smith". Notable people with this surname include:

- Esben Smed (b. 1984), Danish actor
- Lis Smed (1914–1944), Danish actress
- Peer Smed (1878–1943), Danish-American silversmith
