= Kavalyonak =

Kavalyonak (Belarusian: Кавалёнак) is a Belarusian patronymic surname derived from the nickname Каваль, "blacksmith". Its Russified version is Kovalyonok (Russian: Ковалёнок).

- Dzmitry Kavalyonak, Belarusian footballer
- Vladimir Kovalyonok (born 1942), Soviet cosmonaut
