= Kalvaitis =

- Lithuanian surname
- m.: Kalvaitis
- f.: (unmarried): Kalvaitytė
- f.: (married): Kalvaitienė

Kalvaitis (Kalvaitytė, Kalvaitienė) is a Lithuanian-language surname derived from the word kalvis, "blacksmith". It was Polonized as Kailoweit, Kallwejt, Kalwajt, Kalwajtys, Kałwajtys, Kalweit, Kallweit, Kalwejt. Notable people with this surname include:

- Irena Kalvaitytė (born 1927), Lithuanian ballet dancer and teacher
- Juozas Kalvaitis (1842-1900) one of the first Lithuanian professional musicians and composers
- Paulina Radziulytė-Kalvaitienė (1905 – 1986), Lithuanian athlete and basketball player
- Paulina Kalvaitytė, a founder of the Lithuanian Women's Council
