= Petrich (surname) =

Petrich is surname. Notable people with the surname include:

- Bob Petrich (born 1941), American football player
- Henryk Petrich (born 1959), Polish boxer
- Jim Petrich, Australian businessman
- Soma Orlai Petrich (1822–1880), Hungarian painter

== See also ==
- Petrich (disambiguation)
- Petrić, the South Slavic surname
- Petrič (surname), the Slovene surname
- Petric (surname), the anglicisated surname
