= Human trafficking in Dubai =

Human trafficking in Dubai is the issue of Human trafficking in the United Arab Emirates which encompasses Human rights in Dubai. Victims are lured by false claims related to the higher pay available in Dubai and can include forced labour labourers. Along with demand for migrant laborers was also the demand for migrant sex workers. Because of the diversity in the demographics of individuals who live and work in Dubai, a highly diverse and stratified commercial sex industry also exists to cater to these diversities in background, income, and class. Women are forced into the growing sex trade in Dubai, a centre of human trafficking and prostitution.

Slavery in the Trucial States follows from Slavery in the group of tribal confederations to the south of the Persian Gulf (southeastern Arabia) whose leaders had signed protective treaties, or truces, with the United Kingdom between 1820 and 1892. From the 1990s, Dubai became famous in the United Arab Emirates as a place for the sex trade of Iranian women. Chattel slavery existed in the Trucial States until 1971 when Dubai gained Independence from the United Kingdom as part of the UAE.

== Migrant Sex Work ==
The United Arab Emirates's geographic location makes it an important stepping stone for migrants from the Middle East, Africa, Eastern Europe, and Southeast Asia who wish to eventually work in Europe or the United States. The UAE's economic boom and aggressive development in the early to mid 2000s made it not only attractive to foreign migrants, but also dependent on them. In Dubai, migrants make up almost 90% of the population. While this migrant population is very diverse in terms of nation of origin, the population is divided into mainly two key demographics: poor, vulnerable laborers who come to Dubai through restrictive labor contracts; and rich, Western businessmen and financiers. Both populations contribute to Dubai and the greater UAE in very different yet very important ways. While the more privileged Western migrants contribute financial capital to the development of the city, the poor migrants contribute much of the physical labor necessary to build the city's physical structures.

The UAE's migrant sex worker population is highly diverse and burgeoning. However, because the UAE has banned prostitution, these sex workers remain largely underground, illegal, and in constant fear of law enforcement intervention and the possibility of deportation.

Because of the UAE's large migrant worker population, restrictive labor contracts, and lack of anti-trafficking partnerships with NGOs, the United States Department of State Trafficking In Persons Report gave UAE a series of Tier 3 and Tier 2 Watchlist rankings. As a result, the UAE allowed more local and international NGO presence to develop, including those working to end human trafficking and sex trafficking.
