= Fabra =

Fabra is a surname. Notable people with the surname include:

- Alberto Fabra (born 1964), Spanish politician
- Belén Fabra (born 1977), Spanish actress
- Ferdinand Fabra (1906–2007), German football manager
- Frank Fabra (born 1991), Colombian football player
- Ignazio Fabra (1930–2008), Italian wrestler
- Pompeu Fabra (1868–1948), Catalan engineer and grammarian

== See also ==
- Fabras
- Fabra Observatory, observatory near Catalonia
