= Victoria Kovalchuk =

Ukrainian artist, writer (1954–2021)

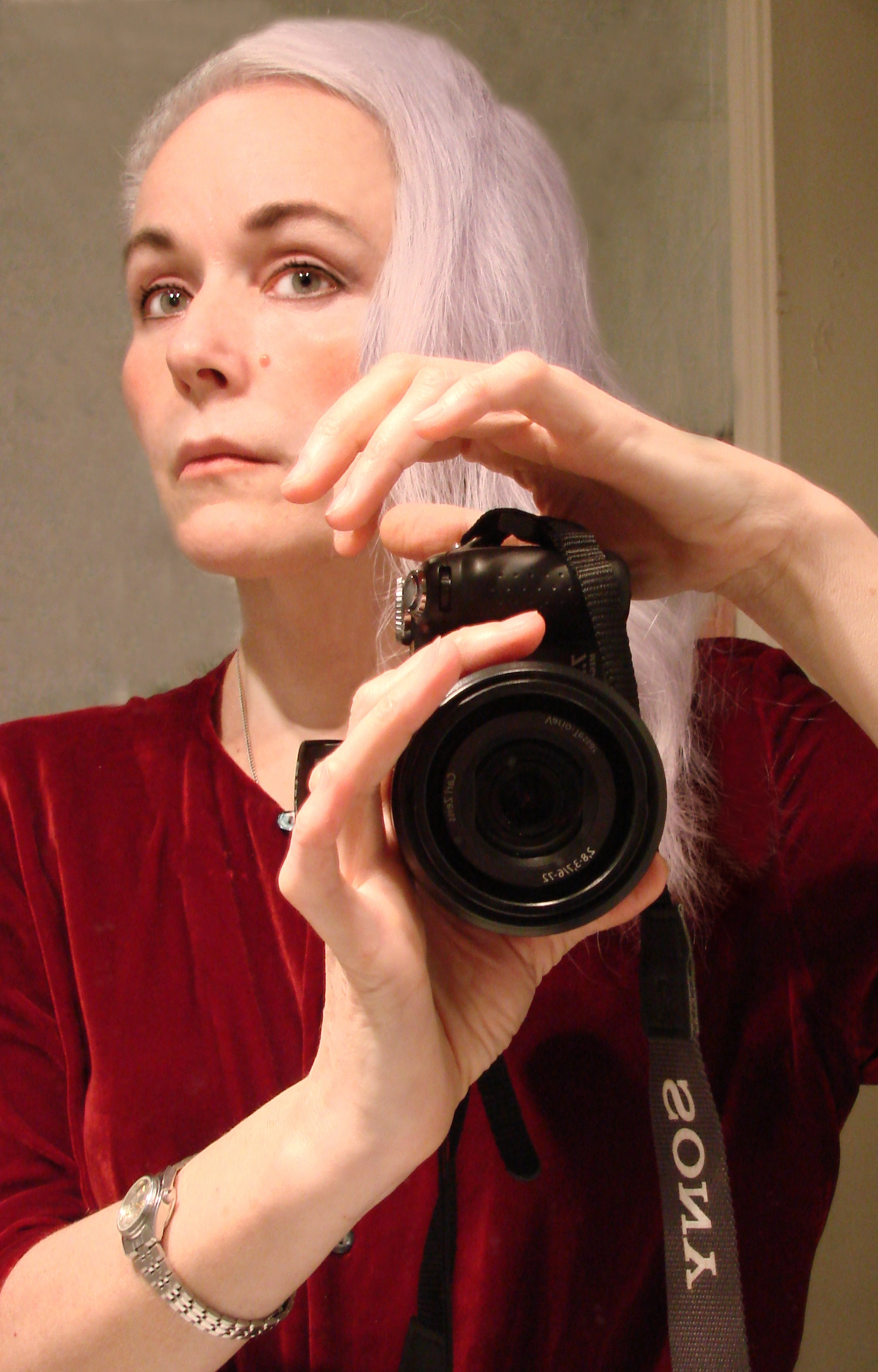
- Born: 26 January 1954; Kovel, Ukrainian SSR, Soviet Union
- Died: 4 April 2021 (aged 67); Lviv, Ukraine
- Resting place: Sykhiv cemetery in Lviv
- Education: Ukrainian Polygraph Institute
- Known for: painting, writing, design

Viktoria Kovalchuk (26 January 1954 – 4 April 2021) was a Ukrainian graphic artist, illustrator, designer, and writer.

== Biography ==
Born in 1954 in Kovel, Volyn region to an official and a doctor polish roots family, Victoria Kovalchuk was interested in painting and writing since childhood and attended various art clubs and an evening art school. In school Kovalchuk took part in and won different regional and national literary contests. She has written a lot of fairy tales and short stories. Her articles on art and society are often published in Ukrainian newspapers.

During 1972-1978, Kovalchuk was studying at the Ukrainian Polygraph Institute. Upon graduating she worked as a head of book design department of the Ukrainian Polygraph Institute, the head of design at the publishing house The Highest School, the design editor of Bricklager publishing house, and a lecturer at the Ukrainian Design Academy.

Kovalchuk was an independent artist, who painted paintings and illustrated books. She has already completed about 200 books in various genres, among them more than thirty for children.

One of her works is ABC, which received the First Degree Diploma at the 2000 Ukrainian Art Books contest and was named the best book of the year. Specialists admit it's one of the best books on the alphabet in the world. ABC has been reprinted nine times for a total circulation of more than 1,200,000 copies.

Another book Ukrainian folk clothing contains her scientific research in the ethnography field. She worked on it for four years: from 1990 until 1994. A perfectly illustrated book, it was recognized as one of the best books of 2001.

Her children's book The Golden Penguin was published in the United Kingdom in 2004 and was presented in Covent Garden in London. Characters from the book were performed by the actors of the Covent Garden Theatre.

Kovalchuk has won a large number of other prizes in Ukraine, Russia, and Moldova. Her paintings have been shown at international exhibitions in Lviv, Kyiv, Koktebel, Moscow, and Volgograd. In 1999 Lviv State Television produced the film Poetic Theatre of Victoria Kovalchuk directed by Evgenij Bondarenko.

== Creative work ==
The creative motto of Victoria Kovalchuk is: "An artist is a herald, not the gardener of his own pride." A mythical realist, her work is greatly influenced by symbolism, futurism, and folk art. Since 2005 Kovalchuk has created her own line, called «prikolizm» (en: «fun-art»), a kind of protest against consumerism with decadent postmodernist decadence.

Living in Lviv, the town where various cultures cross, the artist tries to absorb the best traditions of Polish, Hebrew and Russian people that have lived in Galicia together for hundreds of years. Kovalchuk was also interested in life of the Carpathian Highlanders: their traditions, customs, and beliefs. Her pictures are full of love and tolerance.

Victoria Kovalchuk's artist works could be divided into several periods:

1. Ethno-period with surrealist elements,
2. East period – meditative paintings under the influence of Buddhism and Hinduism,
3. Mythical realism – an attempt to visualize the properties of a human soul,
4. «Prikolizm» (Fun-art) – a reply to vulgar materialism, mechanistic civilization with the cult of greed and violence.

== Death ==
She died of complications caused by COVID-19 during the COVID-19 pandemic in Ukraine in Lviv on 4 April 2021. She was buried at the Sykhiv cemetery in Lviv. In 2022, a street in the city of Kovel was named in honor of Victoria Kovalchuk.
