= Maksim Kavalchuk =

Belarusian footballer

Personal information
- Date of birth: 5 March 2000 (age 26)
- Place of birth: Brest, Belarus
- Position: Midfielder

Team information
- Current team: Niva Dolbizno
- Number: 10

Youth career
- 2017–2019: Dinamo Brest

Senior career*
Years	Team	Apps	(Gls)
2019–2022	Dinamo Brest	5	(0)
2019	→ Energetik-BGU Minsk (loan)	2	(0)
2021	→ Energetik-BGU Minsk (loan)	1	(0)
2023–	Niva Dolbizno	23	(1)
- * Club domestic league appearances and goals as of 31 December 2024

Maksim Kavalchuk (Belarusian: Максім Кавальчук; Russian: Максим Ковальчук; born 5 March 2000) is a Belarusian professional footballer who plays for Niva Dolbizno.
