= Aleksandr Kovalenko =

Aleksandr Kovalenko may refer to:

- Aleksandr Kovalenko (athlete) (born 1963), Belarusian triple jumper
- Alexandr Covalenco (born 1978), Moldovan football defender
- Alexander Kovalenko (canoeist) (born 1986), Russian sprint canoeist
- Aleksandr Kovalenko (footballer) (born 2003), Russian football midfielder for Zenit Saint Petersburg
