= Mchedlidze =

Mchedlidze is a Georgian surname. Notable people with the surname include:

- Simon Mchedlidze (1856–1924), Georgian Orthodox martyr
- Guram Mchedlidze (1931–2009), Georgian biologist
- Levan Mchedlidze (born 1990), Georgian footballer
- Nana Mchedlidze (1926-2016), Georgian film director, actress and screenwriter
- Tamaz Mchedlidze (born 1993), Georgian rugby union player
