= Fabbro =

Fabbro is a surname. Notable people with the surname include:

- Corrado dal Fabbro (1945–2018), Italian bobsledder
- Mario Dal Fabbro (1913–1990), Italian American sculptor, furniture designer, and author
- Dante Fabbro (born 1998), Canadian ice hockey player
- Darío Fabbro (born 1976), retired Argentina footballer who played in the MLS
- Gilberto William Fabbro (born 1977), Brazilian attacking midfielder
- Joe Fabbro (1914–1978), Canadian politician
- Jonathan Fabbro (born 1982), Argentine-Paraguayan football midfielder
- Ronald Peter Fabbro (born 1950), Roman Catholic Bishop of London, Ontario, Canada
