= Fabre =

Fabre or Fabré is a surname of Occitan French origin, and a given name. Notable people with the name include:

- André Fabre (born 1945), French horse racing trainer
- Cándido Fabré, Cuban musician, songwriter and singer
- Catherine Fabre, French politician
- Cindy Fabre (born 1985), Miss France for 2005
- Dominique Fabre (novelist) (1929–2010), Swiss detective novelist and screenwriter
- Dominique Fabre (born 1960), French novelist
- Édouard Fabre (1885–1939), Canadian runner
- Édouard-Charles Fabre (1827–1896), archbishop of Montreal
- Fabre d'Églantine (1750–1794), French dramatist and revolutionary
- Fabre d'Olivet (1767–1825), French author, poet, and composer
- François-Xavier Fabre (1766–1837), French painter of historical subjects
- Georges Fabre (1844–1911), French forestry engineer
- Giuseppe Fabre (1910–2007), Italian lieutenant general and skier
- Hector Fabre (1834–1910), Canadian politician and diplomat
- Henri Fabre (1882–1984), French aviator and inventor of the first successful seaplane
- Isidro Fabré (born 1895, date of death unknown), Cuban baseball pitcher
- Jacques E. Fabre (born 1955), Haitian-American Catholic bishop
- Jan Fabre (born 1958), Belgian stage director
- Jean-Henri Fabre (1823–1915), French entomologist
- Jean-Marc Fabre (born 1964), French cinematographer
- Laurent Fabre (born 1968), French ski mountaineer
- Moumouni Fabré (born 1953), Burkinabé politician
- Pascal Fabre (born 1960), French Formula One driver
- Pierre Fabre (businessman) (1926–2013), French businessman
- Robert Fabre (1915–2006), French politician and pharmacist
- Valentine Fabre (born 1976), French ski mountaineer

== Fictional characters ==
- Luke fon Fabre (ND2000), a fictional character from the video game, Tales of the Abyss
