= Kovalik =

Kovalik is a Slavic language occupational surname derived from the occupation of smith (koval).

The surname may refer to:

- Jozef Kovalík, Slovak tennis player
- Dan Kovalik, American human rights, labor rights lawyer and peace activist
