= Kajiya =

Kajiya (usually written 加治屋) is a Japanese surname. Notable people with the surname include:

- Jim Kajiya, American computer scientist
- Yoshito Kajiya (born 1938), Japanese politician
- Yuriko Kajiya (born 1984), Japanese ballet dancer
