= Kovachev =

Kovachev (Bulgarian: Ковачев; also transliterated Kovačev, feminine: Kovacheva) is a Bulgarian surname originating from the word Kovach, meaning blacksmith. Notable people with the surname include:

- Andrey Kovatchev
- Bogomil Petrov Kovachev
- Boris Kovatchev
- Diana Kovacheva (born 1975), Bulgarian lawyer and politician
- Martin Kovachev
- Nikola Kovachev
- Nina Kovacheva (born 196, French Bulgarian artist
- Pavel Kovachev
- Petar Kovachev
- Stiliyan Kovachev
- Svetoslav Kovachev
- Valentin Kovachev

== See also ==
- Kovačev, surname
