= Schmied =

Origin
- Language: German
- Meaning: Smith: a worker in metal.

Other names
- Variant forms: Schmidt, Schmiedt, Schmitt, Schmitz, Schmiede

Schmied is a surname of German origin. Its meaning is derived from the German word Schmied, which is a smith (of tin, gold, silver, or other metal). Common variants are Schmidt, Schmitt, and Schmitz.

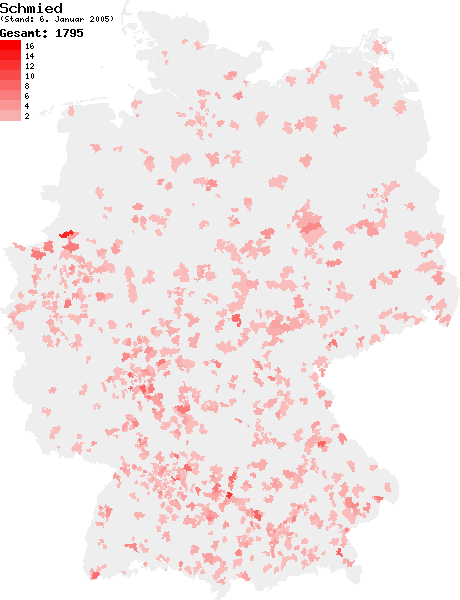
Distribution of the name Schmied in Germany

== People ==
- Bernard Schmied (1933–2024), Swiss basketball player
- Claudia Schmied (born 1959), Austrian politician
- Ernst Schmied (1924–2002), Swiss mountaineer
- Evelyn Schmied (1965–2019), Austrian Paralympic shot put and discus athlete
- François-Louis Schmied (1873–1942), French painter and illustrator
- Frédéric Schmied (1893–1972), Swiss sculptor
- Harald Schmied (1968–2018), Austrian founder of the Homeless World Cup
- Joël Schmied (born 1998), Swiss footballer
- Kenneth A. Schmied (1911–1973), American politician, served as mayor of Louisville, Kentucky
- Kurt Schmied (1926–2007), Austrian football goalkeeper
- Kurt Schmied (cyclist) (born 1965), Austrian cyclist
- Richard Schmied, Austrian cyclist
- Uli Schmied (born 1947), German rower
- Wieland Schmied (1929–2014), Austrian art historian
