= Kovalevich =

Kovalevich is a Slavic surname used in Russian and Ukrainian (spelled Ковалевич, Kovalevich), Belarusian (spelled Кавалевіч, Kavalevich), and Polish (spelled Kowalewicz) cultures.

The surname may refer to:

- Nadezhda Kovalevich (born 1969), Soviet sprint canoer
- Igor Kovalevich (born 1968), Belarusian football coach
- Benjamin Kowalewicz (born 1975), a Canadian singer

== See also ==
- Kovacevich, a surname
- Kovachevich, a surname
