= Arthur Farre =

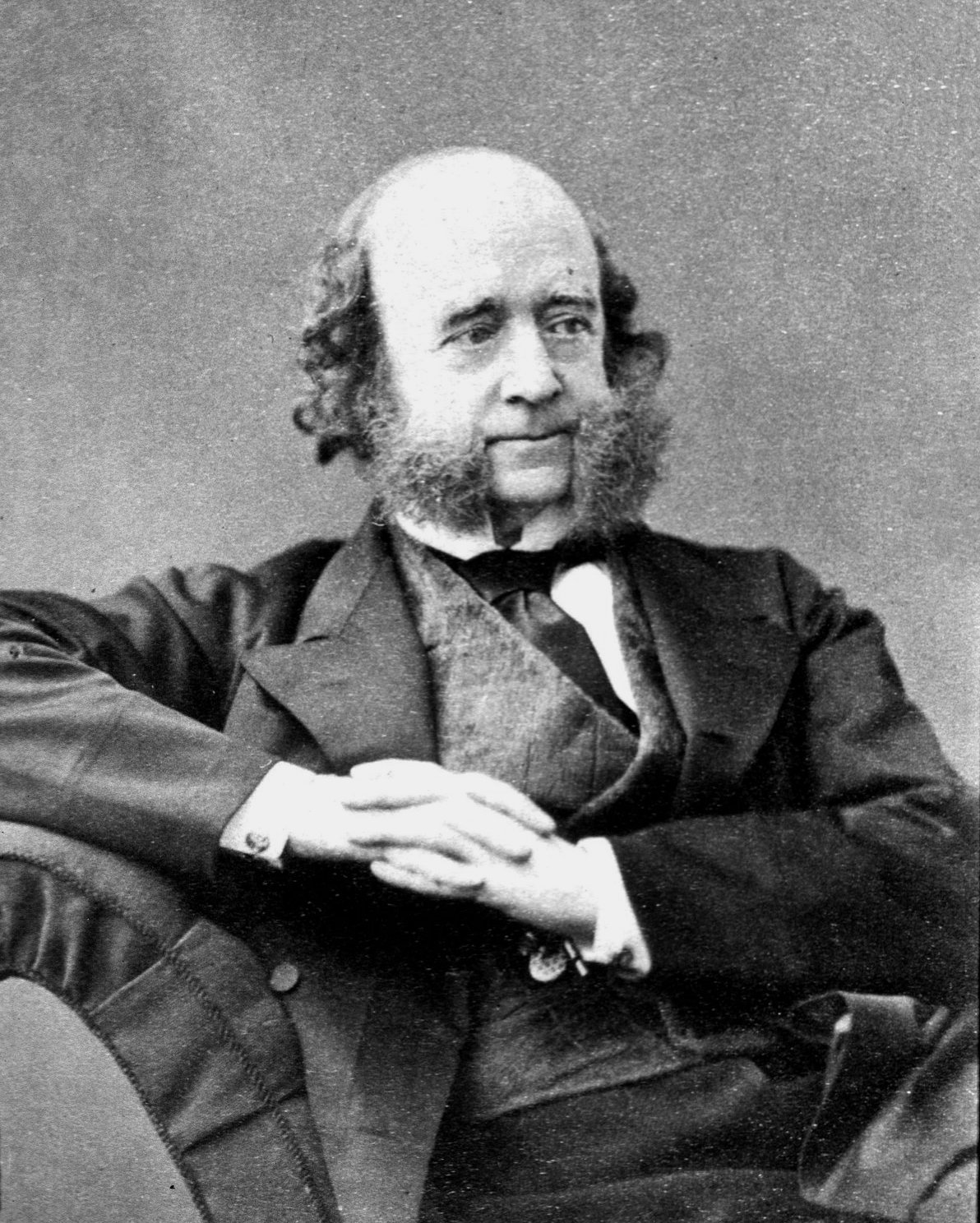

Arthur Farre FRS (6 March 1811, in London – 17 December 1887, in London) was an English obstetric physician.

== Life ==
Farre was born in London on 6 March 1811, to Dr. John Richard Farre. He was educated at Charterhouse School and Caius College, Cambridge. After studying medicine at St. Bartholomew's Hospital, he graduated MB at Cambridge in 1833 and MD in 1841, and he became a fellow of the Royal College of Physicians in 1843. From 1836 to 1837, he lectured on comparative anatomy at St Bartholomew's, and from 1838 to 1840 on forensic medicine. In 1841, Farre became professor of obstetric medicine at King's College and physician-accoucheur at King's College Hospital, serving in these roles until 1862. At the College of Physicians he was in succession censor, examiner, and councillor, and was Harveian orator in 1872. Farre served as examiner in midwifery at the Royal College of Surgeons for twenty-four years (1852–1875). In 1875, he and two colleagues resigned their posts in protest of women being admitted to the college's examination in midwifery. They believed that women did not have adequate qualifications in medicine or surgery. Since no suitable successors were willing to be examiner, his effort was successful in the short term – though it encouraged parliamentary intervention, in the form of the Medical Act 1876, which empowered licensing bodies to admit women for medical qualifications.

Farre was a successful fashionable obstetrician: he attended the Princess of Wales and other members of the royal family, and was made physician extraordinary to The Queen. On the death of Sir Charles Locock in 1875, Farre was elected honorary president of the Obstetrical Society of London, to which he gave a collection of pelves and gynæcological casts.

Farre died in London on 17 December 1887, and was buried at Kensal Green on 22 December. He left no children, and his wife died before him.

== Works ==
His main contribution to medical literature was his article on 'The Uterus and its Appendages,’ constituting parts 49 and 50 of Robert Bentley Todd's Cyclopædia of Anatomy and Physiology, issued in 1858. He contributed papers on microscopy to the Royal Microscopical Society's Journal and Transactions, and was president of the society from 1851 to 1852. An early microscopical paper of his, 'On the Minute Structure of some of the Higher Forms of Polypi' (Philosophical Transactions, 1837), secured his election to the Royal Society in 1839.
