= Theodor Schwenk =

Theodor Schwenk (1910–1986) was an anthroposophist, engineer and a pioneering water researcher who founded the Institute for Flow.

He is most well known for his book, Sensitive Chaos: The Creation of Flowing Forms in Water and Air, which explores subtle patterns and phenomena of water, air and their relationship to biological forms. The narrative of the book is in the tradition of Goethe and Rudolf Steiner, viewing nature as ruled by a single unifying principle which is apparent in all movement and form.

He was director of the Institute of Fluid Science in Herrischried, Germany.

== See also ==
- Chaos theory
