= Kovačevski =

Kovačevski (Macedonian: Ковачевски) is a Macedonian surname. Notable people with the surname include:

- Dimitar Kovačevski (born 1974), Macedonian politician and economist
- Slobodan Kovačevski, Macedonian politician
