= Petrovsky =

Petrovsky (feminine: Petrovskaya) is a Russian-language surname. Notable people with the surname include:

== People ==
- Adolf Petrovsky (1887–1937), Soviet diplomat
- Alyona Petrovskaya (born 1981), Russian singer
- Boris Petrovsky (1908–2004), Soviet surgeon and politician
- Ernst-Ludwig Petrowsky (1933–2023), German jazz saxophonist
- David Petrovsky (Lipetz) (also known as Max Goldfarb, Bennett, Humboldt, Brown (1886–1937), Jewish revolutionary politician, economist, journalist, general of the Red Army, and Soviet statesman
- Grigory Petrovsky (1878–1958), Ukrainian revolutionary
- Ivan Petrovsky (1901–1973), Soviet mathematician
- Kristina Petrovskaia (born 1980), retired Russian ice hockey player
- Kyra Petrovskaya Wayne (1918–2018), Russian-American writer
- Leonid Petrovsky (1897–1941), Soviet lieutenant general
- Margarita Petrovskaya (1933–2019), Russian astronomer, the namesake of 5319 Petrovskaya, minor planet
- Nestor Petrovsky (1875–1921), Russian philologer, best known for his "Словарь русских личных имён" (Dictionary of Russian First Names)
- Nikandr Petrovsky (1891–1968), Russian teacher best known for his Dictionary of Russian First Names
- Nikolai Petrovsky (1837–1908), Russian diplomat
- Yohanan Petrovsky-Shtern (born 1962), Russian-American historian, philologist and essayist

== Fictional characters ==
- Aleksandr Petrovsky, fictional character played by Mikhail Baryshnikov in Sex and the City
