= Kovačević =

Kovačević (Serbo-Croatian, Serbo-Croatian Cyrillic: Ковачевић), Kovačevič (Slovene and Slovak; feminine (Slovak): Kovačevičová) or Kovačovič (Slovak; feminine: Kovačovičová), is a Slavic surname meaning "[black]smith's son". The surname is derived from Kovač, which means '[black]smith', and is the equivalent of English Smithson.

Kovačević is the second most frequent surname in Croatia. It is the equivalent of the Polish surname Kowalewicz which has the same meaning. Notable people with the surname include:

== Politics and military ==
- Anto Kovačević (1952–2020), Croatian politician
- Božo Kovačević (politician) (born 1955), Croatian politician and diplomat
- Karla Kovačević (1870–1942), Croatian and Yugoslav politician
- Milan Kovačević (1941–1998), Serbian politician
- Sava Kovačević (1905–1943), Montenegrin partisan commander
- Veljko Kovačević (1912–1994), Montenegrin writer and general
- Vladimir Kovačević (military officer) (born 1961), Montenegrin Serb military officer

== Sport ==
- Abid Kovačević (born 1952), Bosnian footballer
- Adnan Kovačević (born 1993), Bosnian footballer
- Aleksandar Kovačević (footballer) (born 1992), Serbian footballer
- Aleksandar Kovacevic (tennis) (born 1998), American tennis player
- Ante Kovacevic (born 1974), Australian footballer
- Božo Kovačević (footballer) (born 1979), Austrian footballer
- Darko Kovačević (born 1973), Serbian footballer
- Hrvoje Kovačević (born 1982), Croatian footballer
- Johnathan Kovacevic (born 1997), Canadian ice hockey player
- Marijan Kovačević (born 1973), German-Croatian footballer
- Mihael Kovačević (born 1988), Swiss footballer
- Mladen Kovačevič (born 1980), Slovenian footballer
- Nenad Kovačević (born 1980), Serbian footballer
- Oliver Kovačević (born 1974), Serbian footballer
- Radomir Kovačević (1954–2006), Yugoslav Olympic judo champion and coach
- Sabahudin Kovačevič (born 1986), Slovenian ice hockey player
- Saša Kovačević (footballer) (born 1973), Serbian footballer
- Stevan Kovačević (born 1988), Serbian footballer
- Vladan Kovačević (born 1997), Serbian footballer
- Vladica Kovačević (Vladimir Kovačević, 1940–2016), Serbian footballer
- Vladimir Kovačević (born 1992), Serbian footballer
- Vlatko Kovačević (Vladimir Kovačević, born 1942), Croatian chess grandmaster

== Other ==
- Dušan Kovačević (born 1948), Serbian playwright and director
- Ferdinand Kovačević (1838–1913), Croatian inventor and engineer
- Jelena Kovačević, Serbian-American engineering professor and dean

== See also ==
- Kovačevići (disambiguation)
- List of most common surnames in Europe
