= Kovachevich =

Kovachevich is surname. Notable people with the surname include:

- Elizabeth A. Kovachevich (born 1936), American judge
- Thomas Kovachevich (born 1942), American visual artist and physician
- Pete Kovachevich, American musician and singer

== See also ==
- Kovachevski, surname
