= Josep Maria Farré Naudi =

Andorran politician (born 1960)

Josep Maria Farré Naudi (born 8 May 1960) is an Andorran politician. He is a member of the Liberals of Andorra.
