= Kovalyov =

Kovalyov (Russian: Ковалёв), often written as Kovalev, or its feminine variant Kovalyova, Kovaleva (Ковалёва), is a common Russian surname, an equivalent of the English surname Smithson (derived from the Ukrainian word koval' (коваль), which means "blacksmith"). Due to the ambiguous status of the Cyrillic letter yo, the surname may be written with the Cyrillic letter ye (Russian: Ковалев/Ковалева) instead, though literate Russian speakers always pronounce it yo.

Notable people with the surname include:

- Aleksandr Sergeyevich Kovalyov (b. 1982), Russian footballer
- Aleksandr Vladimirovich Kovalyov (b. 1975), Russian sprint canoer
- Alexei Kovalev (born 1973), Russian professional ice hockey player
- Anton Kovalyov (born 1992), Ukrainian-born Canadian chess grandmaster
- Gennady Kovalev (born 1983), Russian boxer
- Gennady Kovalev (biathlete) (1945–2024), Soviet-Russian biathlete
- Mikhail Kovalyov (1897–1967), Soviet military leader
- Nikolay Kovalyov (politician) (1949–2019), Russian politician, Chair of the State Duma's Veterans' Committee, former head of the Federal Security Service (FSB)
- Nikolay Kovalev (fencer) (born 1986), Russian sabre fencer
- Oleksii Kovalov (1989–2022), Ukrainian politician
- Pasha Kovalev (born 1980), Russian professional Latin and ballroom dancer
- Praskovia Kovalyova-Zhemchugova, Russian serf actress and opera singer
- Sergey Kovalev (born 1983), Russian boxer
- Sergei Kovalev (1930–2021), Russian human rights activist and politician, first Commissioner for Human Rights in the Russian Federation (1994–95)
- Sergei Nikitich Kovalev (Petrograd, August 15, 1919 – St. Petersburg, February 24, 2011), Russian designer of the U.S.S.R. nuclear submarine
- Valentin Kovalyov (born 1944), Russian politician
- Valery Kovalev (1970–2021), Russian entrepreneur, philanthropist and Wikipedian
- Vladimir Kovalyov (born 1953), Soviet figure skater
- Vladislav Kovalev (born 1994), Belarusian chess grandmaster

In fiction:

Major Kovalyov, protagonist of Nicolai Gogol's The Nose
