= Kovač =

Origin
- Language: Proto-Slavic
- Derivation: kovač
- Meaning: Blacksmith

Kovač (Serbo-Croatian Cyrillic: Ковач) is a surname derived from the Proto-Slavic word kovač, which translates to blacksmith. It is common across Europe, specifically countries in Southeast Europe such as Bosnia and Herzegovina, Croatia, Serbia, and Slovenia.

Kovač is a common surname in Croatia, with 9,614 carriers (2011 census), most of them living in northern and eastern parts of the country. The surname is one of the most common surnames in five counties of Croatia. It is common in Serbia, with 8,749 people bearing it. In Slovenia, some 4,800 have this surname. Outside Europe, the surname is fairly common in the United States (especially Texas and California), Canada, and South America.

The surname Kovács is the Hungarian loanword of this word, and is one of the most frequent surnames in Hungary. The Romanian form is Covaci, and it is also a relatively frequent surname in Romania. The derivative forms Kovačić or Slovenian Kovačič, as well as Kovačević and Bulgarian Kovachev, are also very common.

== Notable people ==
- Aleksandra Kovač (born 1972), Serbian singer/songwriter
- Boris Kovač (born 1955), Serbian composer and multi-instrumentalist
- Ðani Kovač (1939–2026), Yugoslav and Serbian sprinter
- Edvard Kovač (born 1950), Slovenian theologian
- Jovan Kovač (1772–1831), Serbian revolutionary
- Jože Kovač (born 1961), Slovenian hockey player
- Kordula Kovac (born 1957), German politician
- Kornelije Kovač (1942–2022), Serbian musician/producer
- Kristina Kovač (born 1974), Serbian singer/songwriter
- Marko Kovač (born 1981), Serbian architect, film director and actor
- Mario Kovač (artist) (born 1975), Croatian theatre and movie director
- Mario Kovač (scientist), Croatian computer engineering professor and inventor
- Mario Kovač (politician), Croatian politician, see Cabinet of Ivica Račan I
- Mirko Kovač (1938–2013), Montenegrin writer
- Mirko Kovač (born 1983), Serbian basketball player
- Mišo Kovač (born 1941), Croatian singer
- Niko Kovač (born 1971), Croatian football player and coach
- Nikola "NiKo" Kovač (born 1997), Bosnian Counter-Strike player
- Robert Kovač (born 1974), Croatian football player
- Roberto Kovac (born 1990), Swiss basketball player
- Slobodan Kovač (born 1967), Serbian volleyball player
- Sonja Kovač (born 1984), Croatian actress and model
- Tinkara Kovač (born 1978), Slovenian singer/musician

== Fictional characters ==
- Luka Kovač, doctor portrayed by Goran Višnjić on ER
- Steve Kovac, character cryogenically frozen in Howard Fast's The Cold, Cold Box
