= Petrić =

Petrić (Serbian Cyrillic: Петрић) is a South Slavic surname, a patronymic of Petar. Notable people with the name include:

- Bojan Petrić (born 1984), Bosnian-Herzegovinian football player
- Branka Petrić (born 1937), Serbian actress
- Denis Petrić (born 1988), Slovenian footballer
- Frane Petrić (1529–1597), Catholic priest, philosopher and scientist
- Gordan Petrić (born 1969), Serbian footballer
- Ivo Petrić (1931–2018), Slovenian composer
- Maja Petrić (born 1981), Croatian-American new media artist
- Mladen Petrić (born 1981), Croatian footballer
- Nemanja Petrić (born 1987), Serbian volleyball player
- Nevenka Petrić (1927–2015), Serbian writer, poet
- Nikola Petrić (born 1991), Serbian footballer
- Radojko Petrić (born 1940), Serbian politician
- Ratko Petrić (1941–2010), Croatian sculptor
- Tonka Tomičić Petrić (born 1976), Chilean model and television presenter
- Vlada Petrić (1928–2019), American film historian
- Vladimir Petrić (born 1975), Serbian handball player

== See also ==
- Petrič (surname), the Slovene surname
- Petric (surname), the anglicisated surname
- Petrich (surname)
