= Kovači =

Kovači (Cyrillic: Ковачи), which translates as Blacksmiths from Serbo-Croatian, refers to the following places:

== Bosnia and Herzegovina ==
- Kovači, Goražde
- Kovači, Kiseljak
- Kovači, Tomislavgrad
- Kovači, Živinice

== Croatia ==
- Kovači, Kaštelir-Labinci

== Montenegro ==
- Kovači, Kotor
- Kovači, Nikšić
- Kovači, Plužine
- Kovač, Pljevlja, earlier Kovači

== Serbia ==
- Kovači, Kraljevo
- Kovači, Raška
- Kovači, Tutin

== See also ==
- Kovaçi, a surname
- Kovač (disambiguation)
- Kovačić (disambiguation)
- Kovačići (disambiguation)
- Kovačica (disambiguation)
- Kovačice, a village
- Kovačina, a village
- Kovačevo (disambiguation)
- Kovačevac (disambiguation)
- Kovačevci (disambiguation)
- Kovačevići (disambiguation)
- Kováčová (disambiguation)
- Kováčovce, a village
