= Kovač (disambiguation) =

Kovač is a South Slavic surname.

Kovač may also refer to:

- Kovač (Jičín District), a municipality and village in the Czech Republic
- Kovač, Makedonski Brod, a village in North Macedonia
- Kovač, Pljevlja, a village in Montenegro
- Kovač planina, a mountain in Bosnia and Herzegovina
- Kovač Hill, a hill in Križ, Sevnica in Slovenia

== See also ==
- Kováč, a surname
- Kovach (disambiguation) (Ковач)
- Kovách, a surname
- Kovači (disambiguation)
- Kovačić (disambiguation)
- Kovačići (disambiguation)
- Kovačica (disambiguation)
- Kovačice, a village
- Kovačina, a village
- Kovačevo (disambiguation)
- Kovačevac (disambiguation)
- Kovačevci (disambiguation)
- Kovačevići (disambiguation)
- Kováčová (disambiguation)
- Kováčovce, a village
- Kovak (disambiguation)
- Kovack, a surname
- Kovács, a surname
