= Grbalj =

Coordinates: 42°19′N 18°47′E

Grbalj (Serbian Cyrillic: Грбаљ), denotes a historic, rural region of the Montenegrin littoral, and a parish located between town of Budva and the Luštica peninsula, Bay of Kotor in coastal Montenegro. Most of the region now lies within Kotor Municipality. It is a fertile region defined by the Lovćen Mountain to the east, and terminating at the low western hills overlooking the Adriatic Sea to its west.

== Etymology ==
Grbalj was derived from Gripuli or Grupuli, a derivation of Acruvium, the ancient Roman city located in this vicinity (considered most likely at present-day Kotor, Montenegro).

== Geography ==
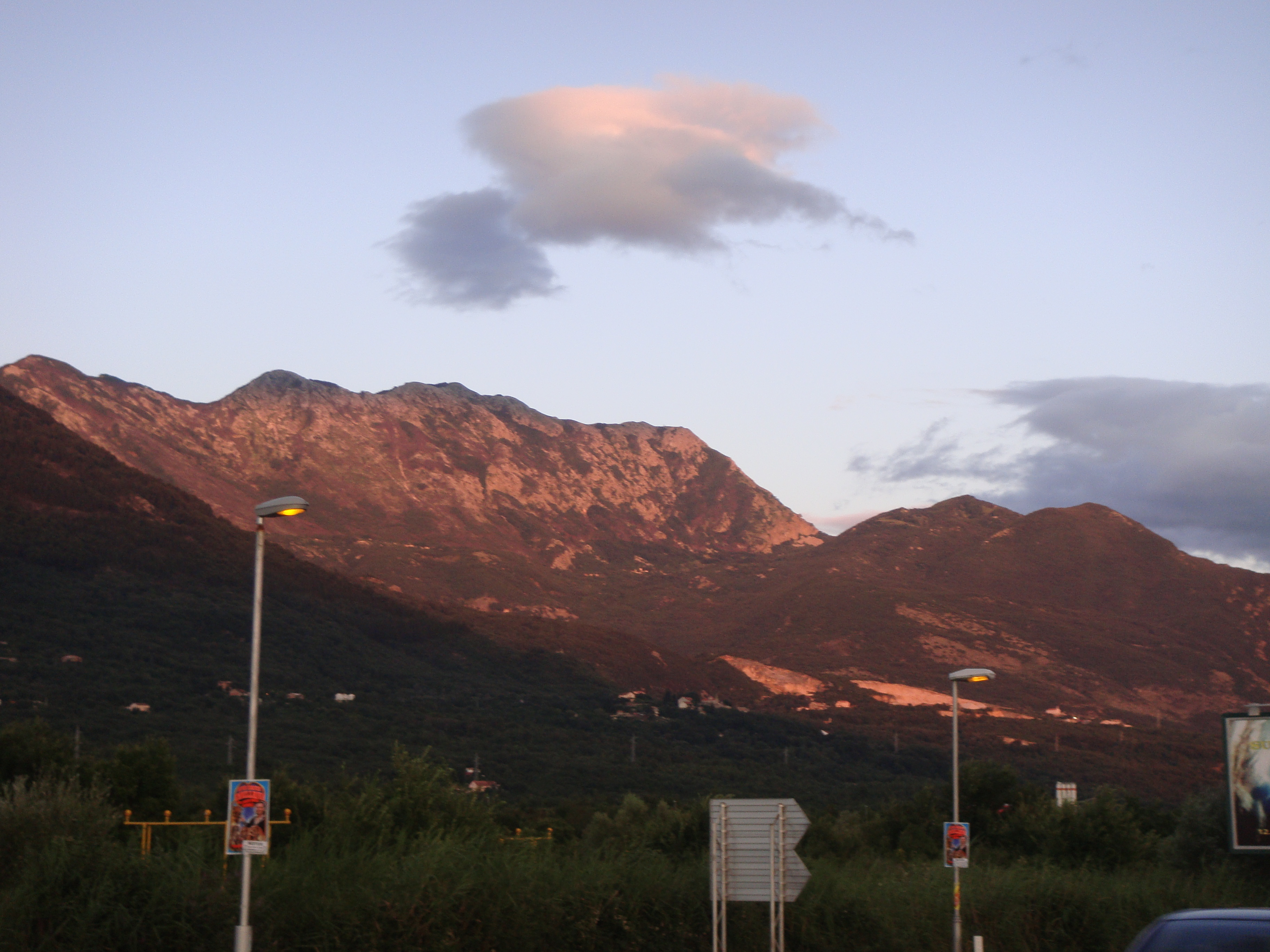
Panoramic view of the Grbalj region in 2009.

The east side of the field, collectively referred to as Upper Grbalj, encompasses ten settlements. Lower Grbalj consists of all settlements at the western edge of the field. Bigova, located within a cove of the same name, is the only settlement situated on the coast. Upper and Lower Grbalj are divided by two creeks. To the south, Kovački Potok ("creek") drains along the alluvial plain of Mrčevo Field into Jaz Bay at the west end of Jaz Beach.

Grbalj's named settlements include Bigova, Bratešići, Višnjeva, Vranovići, Glavati, Glavatičići, Gorovići, Dub, Zagora, Kovači, Krimovica, Kubasi, Lješevići, Nalježići, Pelinovo, Pobrđe, Prijeradi, Sutvara, Trešnjica, Ukropci, Šišići and Mačić.

The Adriatic Highway goes through Grbalj. After its construction, and the subsequent 1979 earthquake, several new settlements were established along its route.

== Economy ==
The region is an important agricultural area. The southern part of the field consists of orchards, vineyards and vegetable gardens. This part of the field ends with the Jaz beach. The industrial area of Kotor lies at the northern part of the Grbalj field.

== History ==
=== Middle Ages ===
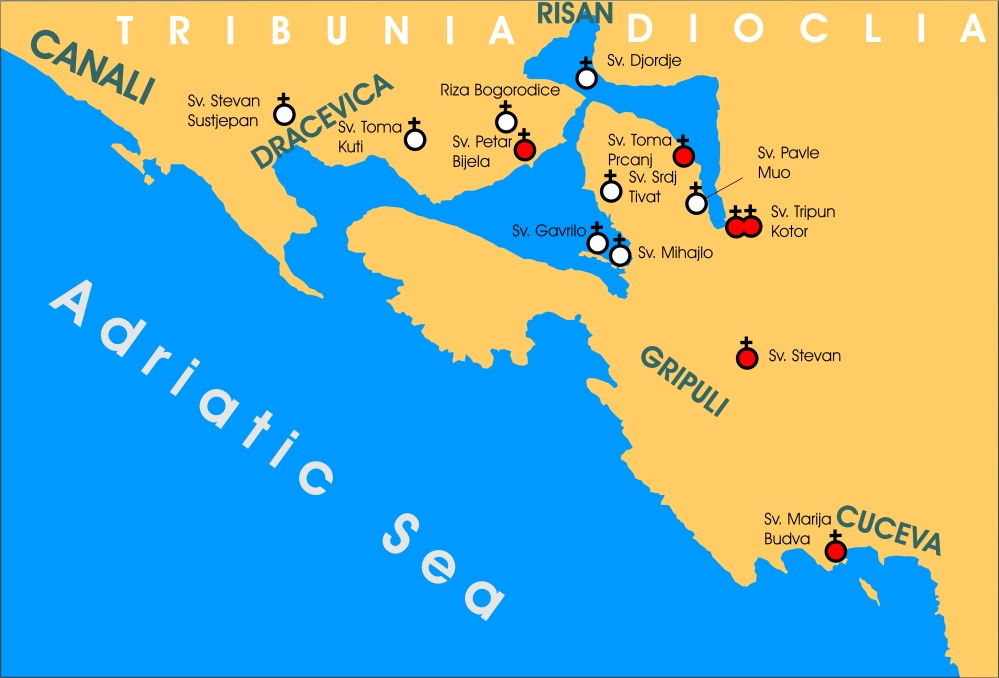
Medieval region, within Bay of Kotor.

Grbalj was a župa of the medieval Serbian state of Duklja, and subsequently part of the Grand Principality of Serbia (1091–1217), the medieval Kingdom of Serbia (1217–1346), and the Serbian Empire (1346–1371) until its fall. During his life, it was also the personal estate of Stefan Vukanović Nemanjić (fl. 1252). Most of Grbalj became part of the Principality of Zeta (1371–1378). Grbalj was part of the Serbian Despotate from 1421 to 1439. The regional, 1427 Code of Grbalj was issued at the župa's Podlastva Monastery. During a transitional period of government, a peasant rebellion erupted in Grbalj (Zeta coast) against Kotor regarding the effects of control by Venice (1451–1452). As part of his efforts to align himself with Venice, Stefanica Crnojević suppressed the rebellion, devastating the region.

In 1497, Firuz Beg captured Grbalj and put Zeta under his effective military control, although it was still part of the Principality of Zeta governed by Stefan II Crnojević. Grbalj eventually became part of what was known as Venetian Albania.

=== Ottoman period ===
The Ottoman Empire census of 1582–83 registered the "vilayet of the Black Mountain" (vilayet-i Kara Dağ, the Montenegro Vilayet), part of the Sanjak of Scutari, as having the following nahiyah, with number of villages: Grbavci with 13 villages, Župa with 11, Malonšići with 7, Pješivci with 14, Cetinje with 16, Rijeka Crnojevića with 31, Crmnica with 11, Paštrovići with 36 and Grbalj with 9 villages; a total of 148 villages.

=== Contemporary history ===
In 1869, Ivo and Jovan Rafailović led a Grbalj uprising against Austria.

Grbalj had been an opština, ("municipality") in post-WWI Yugoslavia.

In 1970, football club OFK Grbalj was founded in Radanovići, Kotor.

== Culture ==
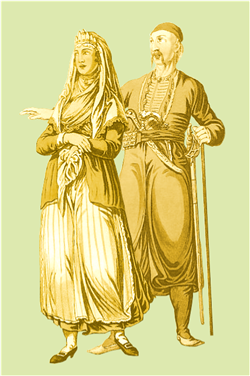
Traditional clothing from the Grbalj region, an 1804 illustration.

The Serbian Orthodox Podlastva Monastery lies in Grbalj. People from Grbalj are known by the demonym Grbljani and are often perceived as a clan.

Overall, in Montenegro, the Nemanjić cult was more widespread than that of Prince Lazar's, though in Grbalj, the latter cult became particularly popular, with the locals claiming Lazar as a native.

== Notable people ==
- Svetozar Marović, former politician and convicted criminal, born in Kotor
- Mitrofan Ban, Orthodox bishop, born in Glavati
- Lazo M. Kostić, Montenegrin Serb lawyer, historian and publicist
- Đorđe Mihailović, keeper of the Serbian Military Cemetery at Zeitenlik
- Ivica Kralj, football goalkeeper, born in Tivat
- Milan Tičić, water polo player, born in Budva
- Vuk Vrčević, collector of folk tales
- Ilija Tučević, football player, born in Kotor
- Marko Carević, former mayor of Budva
