= Kovačići =

Kovačići (Cyrillic: Ковачићи) may refer to several villages in Bosnia and Herzegovina:

- Kovačići, Kalinovik
- Kovačići (Kladanj)
- Kovačići, Nevesinje
- Kovačići, Novi Travnik
- Kovačići, Olovo
- Kovačići, Zenica

== See also ==
- Kovač (disambiguation)
- Kovači (disambiguation)
- Kovačić (disambiguation)
- Kovačica (disambiguation)
- Kovačice, a village
- Kovačina, a village
- Kovačevo (disambiguation)
- Kovačevac (disambiguation)
- Kovačevci (disambiguation)
- Kovačevići (disambiguation)
- Kováčová (disambiguation)
- Kováčovce, a village
