= Kovačevo =

Kovačevo (Cyrillic: Ковачево) may refer to:

- Kovačevo (Novi Pazar), a village in Serbia
- Kovačevo Selo, a village in Bosnia and Herzegovina

== See also ==
- Kovachevo (disambiguation) (Ковачево)
- Kovač (disambiguation)
- Kovači (disambiguation)
- Kovačić (disambiguation)
- Kovačići (disambiguation)
- Kovačica (disambiguation)
- Kovačice, a village
- Kovačina, a village
- Kovačevac (disambiguation)
- Kovačevci (disambiguation)
- Kovačevići (disambiguation)
- Kováčová (disambiguation)
- Kováčovce, a village
