= Kovačevac =

Kovačevac (Cyrillic: Ковачевац) may refer to:

- Kovačevac (Mladenovac), a village near Mladenovac, Serbia
- Kovačevac (Jagodina), a village near Jagodina, Serbia
- Kovačevac (Prijepolje), a village near Prijepolje, Serbia
- Kovačevac (Kačanik), a village near Kačanik, Kosovo
- Kovačevac (Jajce), Bosnia and Herzegovina
- Kovačevac (Jezero), a village near Jezero, Bosnia and Herzegovina
- Kovačevac (Busovača), a village near Busovača, Bosnia and Herzegovina
- Kovačevac (Lipik), a village near Lipik, Croatia
- Kovačevac, Rovišće, a village near Rovišće, Croatia
- Kovačevac (Nova Gradiška), a village near Nova Gradiška, Croatia

== See also ==
- Kovač (disambiguation)
- Kovači (disambiguation)
- Kovačić (disambiguation)
- Kovačići (disambiguation)
- Kovačica (disambiguation)
- Kovačice, a village
- Kovačina, a village
- Kovačevo (disambiguation)
- Kovačevci (disambiguation)
- Kovačevići (disambiguation)
- Kováčová (disambiguation)
- Kováčovce, a village
