= Kovačica (disambiguation) =

Kovačica (Cyrillic: Ковачица) may refer to:

- Kovačica, a town and municipality in South Banat District, Serbia
- Kovaçicë, a village in the municipality of Mitrovica
- Kovačica, Lopare, a village in the municipality of Lopare, Bosnia and Herzegovina
- Kovačica, Tuzla, a village in the municipality of Tuzla, Bosnia and Herzegovina
- Donja Kovačica, a village in the municipality of Veliki Grđevac, Croatia
- Gornja Kovačica, a village in the municipality of Veliki Grđevac, Croatia

== See also ==
- Kovachitsa (Ковачица), a village in the municipality of Lom, Bulgaria
- Kovač (disambiguation)
- Kovači (disambiguation)
- Kovačić (disambiguation)
- Kovačići (disambiguation)
- Kovačice, a village
- Kovačina, a village
- Kovačevo (disambiguation)
- Kovačevac (disambiguation)
- Kovačevci (disambiguation)
- Kovačevići (disambiguation)
- Kováčová (disambiguation)
- Kováčovce, a village
