= Kováčová (disambiguation) =

Kováčová may refer to:

- Kováčová, feminine variant of the Slovak surname Kováč

or:

- Kováčová, Rožňava District, a village in Rožňava District, Slovakia
- Kováčová, Zvolen District, a village in Zvolen District, Slovakia

== See also ==
- Kováčovce, a village
- Kovač, a surname
- Kovač (disambiguation)
- Kovači (disambiguation)
- Kovačić (disambiguation)
- Kovačići (disambiguation)
- Kovačica (disambiguation)
- Kovačice, a village
- Kovačina, a village
- Kovačevo (disambiguation)
- Kovačevac (disambiguation)
- Kovačevci (disambiguation)
- Kovačevići (disambiguation)
