= Kovačevci =

Kovačevci (Cyrillic: Ковачевци) may refer to:

- Kovačevci, Grad, a settlement in the Municipality of Grad, northeastern Slovenia
- Kovačevci (Derventa), a village in Bosnia and Herzegovina
- Kovačevci, Glamoč, a village in Bosnia and Herzegovina

== See also ==
- Kovachevtsi (disambiguation) (Ковачевци)
- Kovač (disambiguation)
- Kovači (disambiguation)
- Kovačić (disambiguation)
- Kovačići (disambiguation)
- Kovačica (disambiguation)
- Kovačice, a village
- Kovačina, a village
- Kovačevo (disambiguation)
- Kovačevac (disambiguation)
- Kovačevići (disambiguation)
- Kováčová (disambiguation)
- Kováčovce, a village
