= Kovačić (disambiguation) =

Kovačić is a South Slavic surname.

Kovačić (Cyrillic: Ковачић) may also refer to:

- Kovačić, Bosnia and Herzegovina, a village in the municipality of Livno
- Kovačić, Croatia, a village in the city of Knin

== See also ==
- Kovač (disambiguation)
- Kovači (disambiguation)
- Kovačići (disambiguation)
- Kovačica (disambiguation)
- Kovačice, a village
- Kovačina, a village
- Kovačevo (disambiguation)
- Kovačevac (disambiguation)
- Kovačevci (disambiguation)
- Kovačevići (disambiguation)
- Kováčová (disambiguation)
- Kováčovce, a village
