= Kovačevići =

Kovačevići (Cyrillic: Ковачевићи) may refer to several places:

- Kovačevići (Cazin), a village in the municipality of Cazin, Bosnia and Herzegovina
- Kovačevići (Sapna), a village in the municipality of Sapna, Bosnia and Herzegovina
- Kovačevići (Donji Vakuf), a village in the municipality of Donji Vakuf, Bosnia and Herzegovina
- Kovačevići (Pljevlja), a village in the municipality of Pljevlja, Montenegro

== See also ==
- Kovačević, a surname
- Kovač (disambiguation)
- Kovači (disambiguation)
- Kovačić (disambiguation)
- Kovačići (disambiguation)
- Kovačica (disambiguation)
- Kovačice, a village
- Kovačina, a village
- Kovačevo (disambiguation)
- Kovačevac (disambiguation)
- Kovačevci (disambiguation)
- Kováčová (disambiguation)
- Kováčovce, a village
