= Kraljevac =

Kraljevac may refer to:

- Kraljevac, Rovišće, a village near Rovišće, Croatia
- Kraljevac, Koprivnica-Križevci County, a village near Križevci, Croatia
- Kraljevac, Lika-Senj County, a village near Senj, Croatia
- Kraljevac, Split-Dalmatia County, a village near Okrug, Croatia
- Kraljevac, Brod-Posavina County, a village near Bukovlje, Croatia
- Kraljevac, Serbia, a special nature reserve near Kovin, Serbia

== See also ==
- Kraljevec (disambiguation)
- Kraljevci (disambiguation)
