= Kovach =

Kovach (Cyrillic: Ковач; also transliterated Kovač) may refer to:

- Kovach (surname)
- Kovach (Stara Zagora Province), a village in Bulgaria
- Kovach (island)
- Duvdevani and Kovach, an Israeli comedy

== See also ==
- Kovách, a surname
- Kovač (disambiguation) (Ковач)
- Kováč, a surname
- Kovachevo (disambiguation) (Ковачево; also translit. Kovačevo)
- Kovachitsa (Ковачица; also translit. Kovačica), a village in Bulgaria
- Kovachevitsa (Ковачевица; also translit. Kovačevica), a village in Bulgaria
- Kovachevtsi (disambiguation) (Ковачевци; also translit. Kovačevci)
