= Kovak =

Kovak may refer to:

- Kovak (band), a British band based in Brighton
- Father Kovak, a fictional character in the film End of Days
- Joe Kovak, a fictional character in the film Jet Job
- Johnny Kovak, a fictional character in the film F.I.S.T.
- Jimmy Kovak, a fictional character in the film Big Ideas
- Michael Kovak, a fictional character in the film The Rite
- Private Kovak, a fictional character in the film To Hell and Back
- Sandra Kovak, a fictional character in the film The Great Lie
- Spence Kovak, a fictional character who has appeared in several television series
- Kovak (aka B.B) , tiktok:kovaksq

== See also ==
- Kovač (disambiguation)
- Kováč, a surname
- Kovack, a surname
