= Kraljevec =

Kraljevec may refer to:

- Kraljevec, Zagreb, a neighborhood in Gornji Grad - Medveščak district, Zagreb, Croatia
- Sesvetski Kraljevec, a neighborhood of Sesvete, wider City of Zagreb area, Croatia
- Kupinečki Kraljevec, a village in the far southern end of City of Zagreb area, Croatia
- Kraljevec na Sutli, a village in Zagorje, Croatia
- Donji Kraljevec, a village in Međimurje, Croatia
- Gornji Kraljevec, a village in Međimurje, Croatia

== See also ==
- Kraljevac (disambiguation)
- Kraljevci (disambiguation)
