= Podlastva Monastery =

Serbian Orthodox monastery near Budva, Montenegro

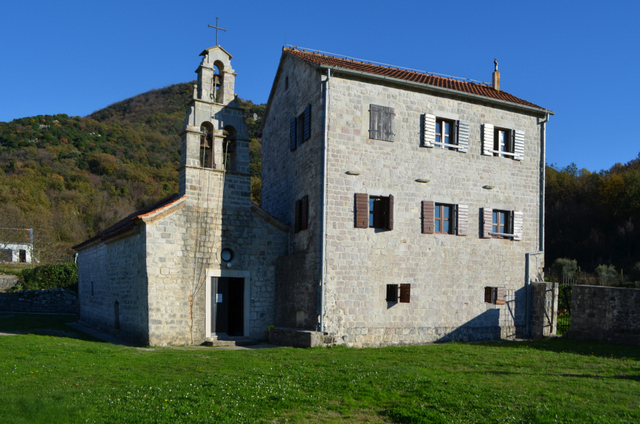

- Location within Montenegro

Religion
- Affiliation: Serbian Orthodox Church
- Region: Grbalj
- Rite: Byzantine Rite
- Year consecrated: Before 1350
- Status: Active

Location
- Location: Lastva Grbaljska, Montenegro
- Interactive map of Podlastva Monastery
- Territory: Metropolitanate of Montenegro and the Littoral
- Coordinates: 42.3073°N 18.8078°E

Architecture
- Type: Byzantine architecture
- Style: Serbo-Byzantine architecture
- Founder: Nemanjić dynasty
- Funded by: Stefan Dušan

The Podlastva Monastery (Serbian: Манастир Подластва, romanized: Manastir Podlastva) is a Serbian Orthodox monastery located in Lastva Grbaljska, in Grbalj, Montenegro. The monastery's church is dedicated to the Nativity of the Theotokos.

According to a local legend, the Podlastva Monastery was established around 1350 by Emperor Dušan. It has been pillaged, burned, destroyed, and renovated several times over its history. Montenegro's 1979 earthquake caused a great deal of damage that was partly rehabilitated in 1984.

Podlastva Monastery has long served as a common gathering place for all Grbljani (people). Many important spiritual, cultural, and political events during this region's turbulent history occurred on the monastery grounds. It also provided educational enrichment during the years in which it had operated a local school.

== Etymology ==
The popular name of the monastery is derived from its location downhill or "below" (pod) the local village of Lastva.

== Architecture ==
The church was constructed of stone masonry under a tiled roof. Its front exterior includes a bell tower attached to an independent narthex. The narthex is structurally attached to both the nave and an adjacent monastery building. An apse is located at the nave's east end.

Both narthex and nave have barrel vaulted ceilings. The nave's ceiling walls are covered with rare, historic frescos dating from the 15th and 17th centuries. Its contemporary iconostasis includes modern icons.

== See also ==
- List of Serbian Orthodox monasteries
