= Carl Patsch =

Austrian archaeologist and historian

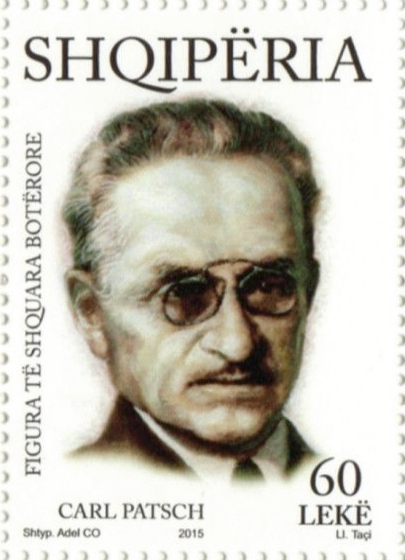
Carl Patsch on a 2015 stamp of Albania

Carl Ludwig Patsch, also Karl Ludwig Patsch, Albanian: Karl Paç; Bulgarian: Карл Пач (14 September 1865 in Kovač – 21 February 1945 in Vienna) was an Austrian Slavist, Albanologist, archaeologist, and historian.

== Biography ==
Carl Patsch was born in north-east Bohemia, then part of the Austro-Hungarian Empire, as a son of Ludwig Patsch, a steward of an upper prince, but grew up in the Ukrainian villages of Marachivka and Slavuta. He spoke Czech, Polish, and Russian as mother languages.

Carl Patsch studied history, geography, and classical philology at the University of Prague, where he finished his doctorate in 1889. He taught in Vienna and Sarajevo and worked in the latter city for the Bosnian–Herzegovinian Museum. In 1908, Patsch founded the Institute for Balkan Research (Institut für Balkanforschung) in Sarajevo, where he remained until the end of World War I. In 1921, he became professor of Slavic history at the University of Vienna and subsequently a member of the Austrian Academy of Sciences. Patsch is known for its articles on ancient Illyrian and Thracian history and culture. In the years 1922 to 1924, Patsch worked in Albania, where he helped in the efforts to establish a national museum. He died in a bombing raid during World War II.

== Works ==
- Die Lika in römischer Zeit, Schriften der Balkankommission, Antiquarische Abteilung, 1. Wien 1900
- Das Sandschak Berat in Albanien, Schriften der Balkankommission, Antiquarische Abteilung, 3. Wien 1904
- Zur Geschichte und Topographie von Narona, Schriften der Balkankommission, Antiquarische Abteilung, 5 (1907)
- Archäologisch-epigraphische Untersuchungen zur Geschichte der römischen Provinz Dalmatien, Wiss. Mitt. aus Bosnien und d. Hercegovina, 8 Folgen in 4–12 (1896–1912)
- Beiträge zur Völkerkunde von Südosteuropa, 6 Bände, 1925–1937
- Historische Wanderungen im Karst und an der Adria. I. Teil: Die Herzegowina einst und jetzt, 1922
- Die einstige Siedlungsdichte des illyrischen Karstes, 1933
- Der Kampf um den Donauraum unter Domitian und Trajan, Hölder-Pichler-Tempsky, Wien 1937

== See also ==
- Albanology
- Slavic studies

== Bibliography ==
- Alois Hajek: "Carl Patsch (1865–1945)". In: Südost-Forschungen. Band 12 (1953), S. 263–269.
- Elsie, Robert (2010). Historical Dictionary of Albania. European Historical Dictionaries, 99-2094237-5; 75 (2nd ed.). Lanham, Md.: Scarecrow Press. ISBN 978-0-8108-6188-6. OCLC 454375231.
- Gerhard Seewann: Patsch, Carl. In: Mathias Bernath, Felix von Schroeder (Hrsg.): Biographisches Lexikon zur Geschichte Südosteuropas. Band 3. Oldenbourg, München 1979, ISBN 3-486-48991-7, S. 405 f.
- Lafe, E., ed. (2009). Fjalor enciklopedik shqiptar [Albanian Encyclopedic Dictionary]. Vol. 3, N–Zh. Tirana: Akademia e Shkencave e Shqipërisë. ISBN 9789995610326. OCLC 705766082.
- Radoslav Dodig, "In Memoriam. Carl Patsch (1865–1945)", Status. Magazine for political culture and society issues 2006/8, s.152-155.
