= Prekobrdo =

- Village
- Location within Croatia
- Coordinates: 45.946192°N 16.788201°E
- Country: Croatia
- County: Bjelovar-Bilogora County
- Municipality: Rovišće

Area
  - Total: 0.69 sq mi (1.8 km^{2})

Population (2021)
  - Total: 93
  - Density: 130/sq mi (52/km^{2})
- Time zone: UTC+1 (CET)
  - Summer (DST): UTC+2 (CEST)

Prekobrdo is a village in Croatia.

== Demographics ==
According to the 2021 census, its population was 93.
