= Lastva Grbaljska =

Lastva Grbaljska Ластва Грбаљска
- Village
- Location within Montenegro
- Coordinates: 42.310514°N 18.803232°E
- Country: Montenegro
- Region: Coastal
- Municipality: Kotor

Population (2011)
  - Total: 530
- Time zone: UTC+1 (CET)
  - Summer (DST): UTC+2 (CEST)

Lastva Grbaljska (Montenegrin: Ластва Грбаљска) is a village in the municipality of Kotor, Montenegro.

== Demographics ==
According to the 2011 census, its population was 530.

Ethnicity in 2011
Ethnicity	Number	Percentage
Serbs	273	51.5%
Montenegrins	200	37.7%
other/undeclared	57	10.8%
Total	530	100%
