= Nalježići =

Nalježići Наљежићи
- Village
- Location within Montenegro
- Coordinates: 42.374152°N 18.775730°E
- Country: Montenegro
- Region: Coastal
- Municipality: Kotor

Population (2011)
  - Total: 129
- Time zone: UTC+1 (CET)
  - Summer (DST): UTC+2 (CEST)

Nalježići (Montenegrin: Наљежићи) is a village in the municipality of Kotor, Montenegro.

== Demographics ==
According to the 2011 census, its population was 129.

Ethnicity in 2011
Ethnicity	Number	Percentage
Serbs	80	62.0%
Montenegrins	32	24.8%
other/undeclared	17	13.2%
Total	129	100%
