= Kovachevo =

Kovachevo (Bulgarian: Ковачево; also transliterated Kovačevo) may refer to three villages in Bulgaria:

- Kovachevo, Blagoevgrad Province, a village in the Sandanski Municipality, Blagoevgrad Province
- Kovachevo, Pazardzhik Province, a village in the Septemvri Municipality, Pazardzhik Province
- Kovachevo, Stara Zagora Province, a village in the Radnevo Municipality, Stara Zagora Province

== See also ==
- Kovačevo (disambiguation) (Ковачево)
- Kovachevtsi (disambiguation) (Ковачевци; also translit. Kovačevci)
- Kovachevitsa (Ковачевица; also translit. Kovačevica), a village in Bulgaria
- Kovachev (Ковачев; also translit. Kovačev), a surname
- Kovach (disambiguation) (Ковач; also translit. Kovač)
