= Žabjak =

- Village
- Location within Croatia
- Coordinates: 45.917129°N 16.7030931°E
- Country: Croatia
- County: Bjelovar-Bilogora County
- Municipality: Rovišće

Area
  - Total: 4.2 sq mi (10.9 km^{2})

Population (2021)
  - Total: 300
  - Density: 71/sq mi (28/km^{2})
- Time zone: UTC+1 (CET)
  - Summer (DST): UTC+2 (CEST)

Žabjak is a village in Croatia.

== Demographics ==
According to the 2021 census, its population was 300.
