= Tuk, Bjelovar-Bilogora County =

Tuk
- Village
- Location within Croatia
- Country: Croatia
- County: Bjelovar-Bilogora County
- Municipalities of Croatia: Rovišće

Area
  - Total: 2.2 sq mi (5.8 km^{2})

Population (2021)
  - Total: 288
  - Density: 130/sq mi (50/km^{2})
- Time zone: UTC+1 (CET)
  - Summer (DST): UTC+2 (CEST)

Tuk is a village in the municipality of Rovišće in Bjelovar-Bilogora County in Croatia.

== Demographics ==
According to the 2021 census, its population was 288. According to the census of 2013, it had 354 inhabitants.
