= Kovachevtsi =

Kovachevtsi (Bulgarian: Ковачевци, pronounced [koˈvat͡ʃɛft͡si]; also transliterated Kovačevci) may refer to two villages in Bulgaria:

- Kovachevtsi, Pernik Province, the administrative centre of Kovachevtsi Municipality
- Kovachevtsi, Sofia Province

== See also ==
- Kovačevci (disambiguation) (Ковачевци)
- Kovachevitsa (Ковачевица; also translit. Kovačevica), a village in Bulgaria
- Kovachevo (disambiguation) (Ковачево; also translit. Kovačevo)
- Kovachev (Ковачев; also translit. Kovačev), a surname
- Kovach (disambiguation) (Ковач; also translit. Kovač)
