= Lješevići =

Lješevići Љешевићи
- Village
- Location within Montenegro
- Coordinates: 42.369068°N 18.724868°E
- Country: Montenegro
- Region: Coastal
- Municipality: Kotor

Population (2011)
  - Total: 192
- Time zone: UTC+1 (CET)
  - Summer (DST): UTC+2 (CEST)

Lješevići (Montenegrin: Љешевићи) is a village in the municipality of Kotor, Montenegro.

== Demographics ==
According to the 2011 census, its population was 192.

Ethnicity in 2011
Ethnicity	Number	Percentage
Serbs	150	78.1%
Montenegrins	21	10.9%
other/undeclared	21	10.9%
Total	192	100%
