= Kakinac =

- Village
- Location within Croatia
- Coordinates: 45.9700049°N 16.7521386°E
- Country: Croatia
- County: Bjelovar-Bilogora County
- Municipality: Rovišće

Area
  - Total: 1.0 sq mi (2.6 km^{2})

Population (2021)
  - Total: 45
  - Density: 45/sq mi (17/km^{2})
- Time zone: UTC+1 (CET)
  - Summer (DST): UTC+2 (CEST)

Kakinac is a village in Croatia.

== Demographics ==
According to the 2021 census, its population was 45.
