= Vranovići =

Vranovići Врановићи
- Village
- Location within Montenegro
- Coordinates: 42.310514°N 18.803232°E
- Country: Montenegro
- Region: Coastal
- Municipality: Kotor

Population (2011)
  - Total: 132
- Time zone: UTC+1 (CET)
  - Summer (DST): UTC+2 (CEST)

Vranovići (Montenegrin: Врановићи) is a village in the municipality of Kotor, Montenegro.

== Demographics ==
According to the 2011 census, its population was 132.

Ethnicity in 2011
Ethnicity	Number	Percentage
Serbs	88	66.7%
Montenegrins	20	15.2%
other/undeclared	24	18.2%
Total	132	100%
