= Glavati =

Glavati Главати
- Village
- Location within Montenegro
- Coordinates: 42.308351°N 18.789858°E
- Country: Montenegro
- Region: Coastal
- Municipality: Kotor

Population (2011)
  - Total: 391
- Time zone: UTC+1 (CET)
  - Summer (DST): UTC+2 (CEST)

Glavati (Montenegrin: Главати) is a village in the municipality of Kotor, Montenegro.

== Demographics ==
According to the 2011 census, its population was 391.

Ethnicity in 2011
Ethnicity	Number	Percentage
Serbs	220	56.3%
Montenegrins	119	30.4%
other/undeclared	52	13.3%
Total	391	100%
