= Domankuš =

- Village
- Location within Croatia
- Coordinates: 45.9923421°N 16.7493183°E
- Country: Croatia
- County: Bjelovar-Bilogora County
- Municipality: Rovišće

Area
  - Total: 1.7 sq mi (4.4 km^{2})

Population (2021)
  - Total: 220
  - Density: 130/sq mi (50/km^{2})
- Time zone: UTC+1 (CET)
  - Summer (DST): UTC+2 (CEST)

Domankuš is a village in Croatia.

== Demographics ==
According to the 2021 census, its population was 220.
