= Podgorci, Rovišće =

Podgorci
- Village
- Location within Croatia
- Coordinates: 45.9667079°N 16.7675078°E
- Country: Croatia
- County: Bjelovar-Bilogora County
- Municipality: Rovišće

Area
  - Total: 2.1 sq mi (5.4 km^{2})

Population (2021)
  - Total: 367
  - Density: 180/sq mi (68/km^{2})
- Time zone: UTC+1 (CET)
  - Summer (DST): UTC+2 (CEST)

Podgorci is a village in Croatia.

== Demographics ==
According to the 2021 census, its population was 367.
