= Lipovčani =

- Village
- Location within Croatia
- Coordinates: 45.9855348°N 16.7724852°E
- Country: Croatia
- County: Bjelovar-Bilogora County
- Municipality: Rovišće

Area
  - Total: 1.2 sq mi (3.0 km^{2})

Population (2021)
  - Total: 49
  - Density: 42/sq mi (16/km^{2})
- Time zone: UTC+1 (CET)
  - Summer (DST): UTC+2 (CEST)

Lipovčani is a village in Croatia.

== Demographics ==
According to the 2021 census, its population was 49.
