= Sutvara =

Sutvara Сутвара
- Village
- Location within Montenegro
- Coordinates: 42.377394°N 18.766916°E
- Country: Montenegro
- Region: Coastal
- Municipality: Kotor

Population (2011)
  - Total: 327
- Time zone: UTC+1 (CET)
  - Summer (DST): UTC+2 (CEST)

Sutvara (Montenegrin: Сутвара) is a village in the municipality of Kotor, Montenegro.

== Demographics ==
According to the 2011 census, its population was 327.

Ethnicity in 2011
Ethnicity	Number	Percentage
Serbs	246	75.2%
Montenegrins	36	11.0%
other/undeclared	45	13.8%
Total	327	100%
