= Križ, Sevnica =

Križ
- Location in Slovenia
- Coordinates: 45°57′58.83″N 15°14′50.43″E
- Country: Slovenia
- Traditional region: Lower Carniola
- Statistical region: Lower Sava
- Municipality: Sevnica

Area
  - Total: 7.8 km^{2} (3.0 sq mi)
- Elevation: 450 m (1,480 ft)

Population (2012)
  - Total: 108
  - Density: 14/km^{2} (36/sq mi)

Križ (pronounced [ˈkɾiːʃ]; German: Kreuzdorf) is a dispersed settlement in the forested hills above the right bank of the Mirna River in the Municipality of Sevnica in central Slovenia. Traditionally, this area south of the Mirna Valley is part of Lower Carniola. It comprises the hamlets of Voznik and Kovačev Hrib at Voznik Hill (503 metres or 1,650 feet) and Kovač Hill (480 metres or 1,570 feet) to the west of it. Other hamlets are Artiče, Gradišče, Košele, Plavne, Reber, and Veliki Vrh. These stand on the hill ridges.

== Kovačev Hrib Church ==
A church built by the people evicted by the Germans during World War II in gratitude for their return home stands in the hamlet of Kovačev Hrib. It is dedicated to the Mary Help of Christians and belongs to the Parish of Tržišče. It can accommodate 50 people.

The little church was originally built in 1953. After the authorities in the Socialist Republic of Slovenia wanted to demolish it, a local man went to Josip Broz Tito personally, who said to him: "If it is standing, then let it stand and don't demolish it." This was enough to preserve the building.

From 2011 to 2012, due to its poor condition, the church was rebuilt. The Russian artist Elena Sigmund, living in Budna Vas, made new stained glass for the church. On 7 October 2012, it was blessed by the Bishop of Novo Mesto, Andrej Glavan.

== Gallery ==
Blessing of the church in Kovačev Hrib

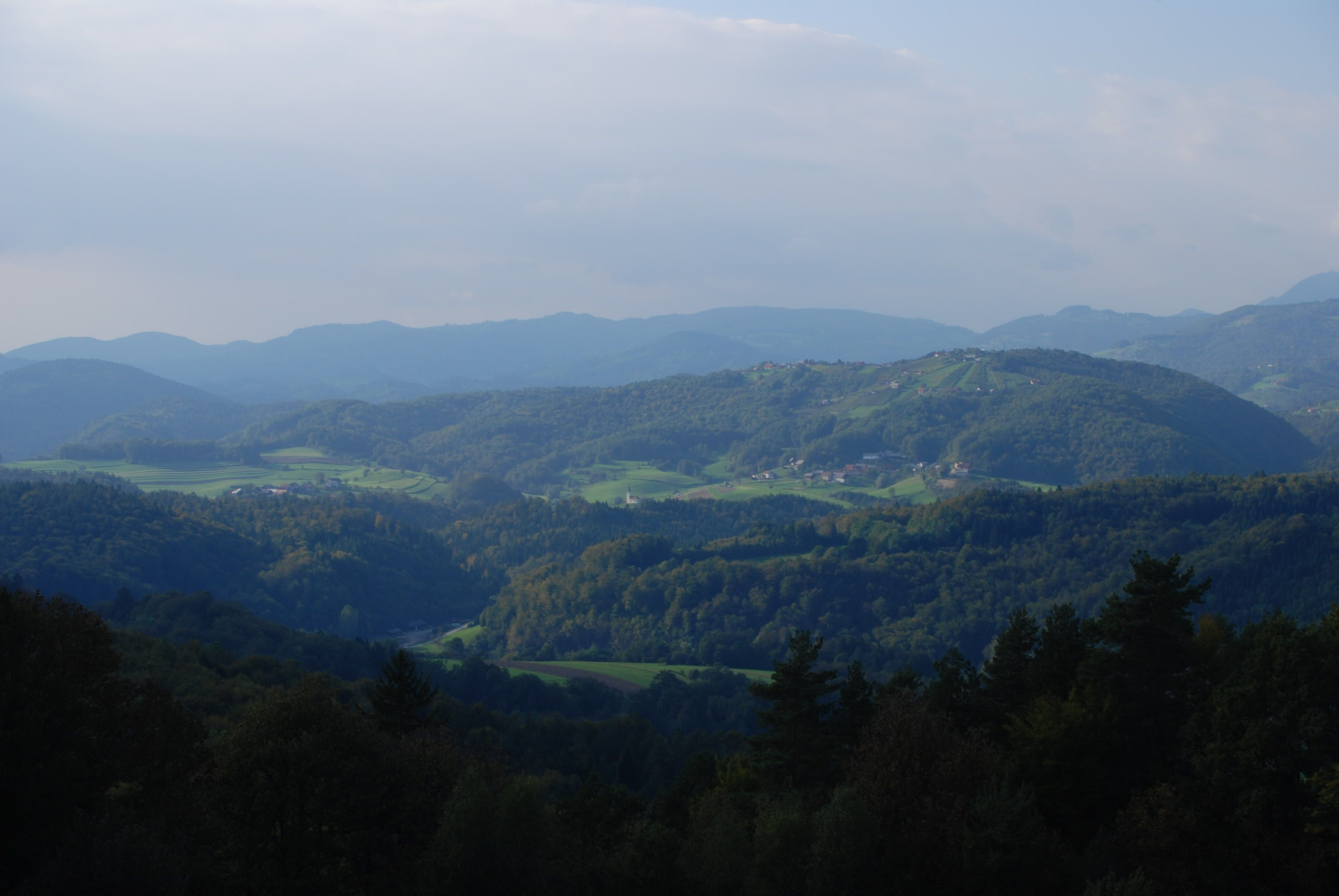
View from Kovačev Hrib toward the east
