= Kovači, Živinice =

Kovači
- Village
- Location within Bosnia and Herzegovina
- Coordinates: 44.4198°N 18.6405°E
- Country: Bosnia and Herzegovina
- Entity: Federation of Bosnia and Herzegovina
- Canton: Tuzla
- Municipality: Živinice

Area
  - Total: 2.62 sq mi (6.78 km^{2})

Population (2013)
  - Total: 3,800
  - Density: 1,500/sq mi (560/km^{2})
- Time zone: UTC+1 (CET)
  - Summer (DST): UTC+2 (CEST)

Kovači is a village in the municipality of Živinice, Bosnia and Herzegovina.

== Demographics ==
According to the 2013 census, its population was 3,800.

Ethnicity in 2013
Ethnicity	Number	Percentage
Bosniaks	3,413	89.8%
Croats	32	0.8%
other/undeclared	355	9.3%
Total	3,800	100%
