= Kovačići, Novi Travnik =

Kovačići
- Village
- Location within Bosnia and Herzegovina
- Coordinates: 44.1330155°N 17.5707993°E
- Country: Bosnia and Herzegovina
- Entity: Federation of Bosnia and Herzegovina
- Canton: Central Bosnia
- Municipality: Novi Travnik

Area
  - Total: 2.63 sq mi (6.82 km^{2})

Population (2013)
  - Total: 42
  - Density: 16/sq mi (6.2/km^{2})
- Time zone: UTC+1 (CET)
  - Summer (DST): UTC+2 (CEST)

Kovačići is a village in the municipality of Novi Travnik, Bosnia and Herzegovina.

== Demographics ==
According to the 2013 census, its population was 42.

Ethnicity in 2013
| Ethnicity | Number | Percentage |
|---|---|---|
| Croats | 41 | 97.6% |
| other/undeclared | 1 | 2.4% |
| Total | 42 | 100% |
