= Kovačica, Lopare =

Kovačica Ковачица
- Village
- Location within Republika Srpska Location within Bosnia and Herzegovina
- Coordinates: 44°34′14″N 18°47′40″E
- Country: Bosnia and Herzegovina
- Entity: Republika Srpska
- Municipality: Lopare
- Time zone: UTC+1 (CET)
  - Summer (DST): UTC+2 (CEST)

Kovačica (Serbian Cyrillic: Ковачица) is a village in the municipality of Lopare, Bosnia and Herzegovina.
