= Kovačevo Selo =

- Village
- Location within Bosnia and Herzegovina
- Coordinates: 44.5244928°N 18.770752°E
- Country: Bosnia and Herzegovina
- Entity: Federation of Bosnia and Herzegovina
- Canton: Tuzla
- Municipality: Tuzla

Area
  - Total: 2.48 sq mi (6.42 km^{2})

Population (2013)
  - Total: 283
  - Density: 114/sq mi (44.1/km^{2})
- Time zone: UTC+1 (CET)
  - Summer (DST): UTC+2 (CEST)

Kovačevo Selo is a village in the municipality of Tuzla, Tuzla Canton, Bosnia and Herzegovina.

== Demographics ==
According to the 2013 census, its population was 283.

Ethnicity in 2013
Ethnicity	Number	Percentage
Bosniaks	189	66.8%
Serbs	63	22.3%
Croats	10	3.5%
other/undeclared	21	7.4%
Total	283	100%
