= Kovač, Makedonski Brod =

Kovač Ковач
- Village
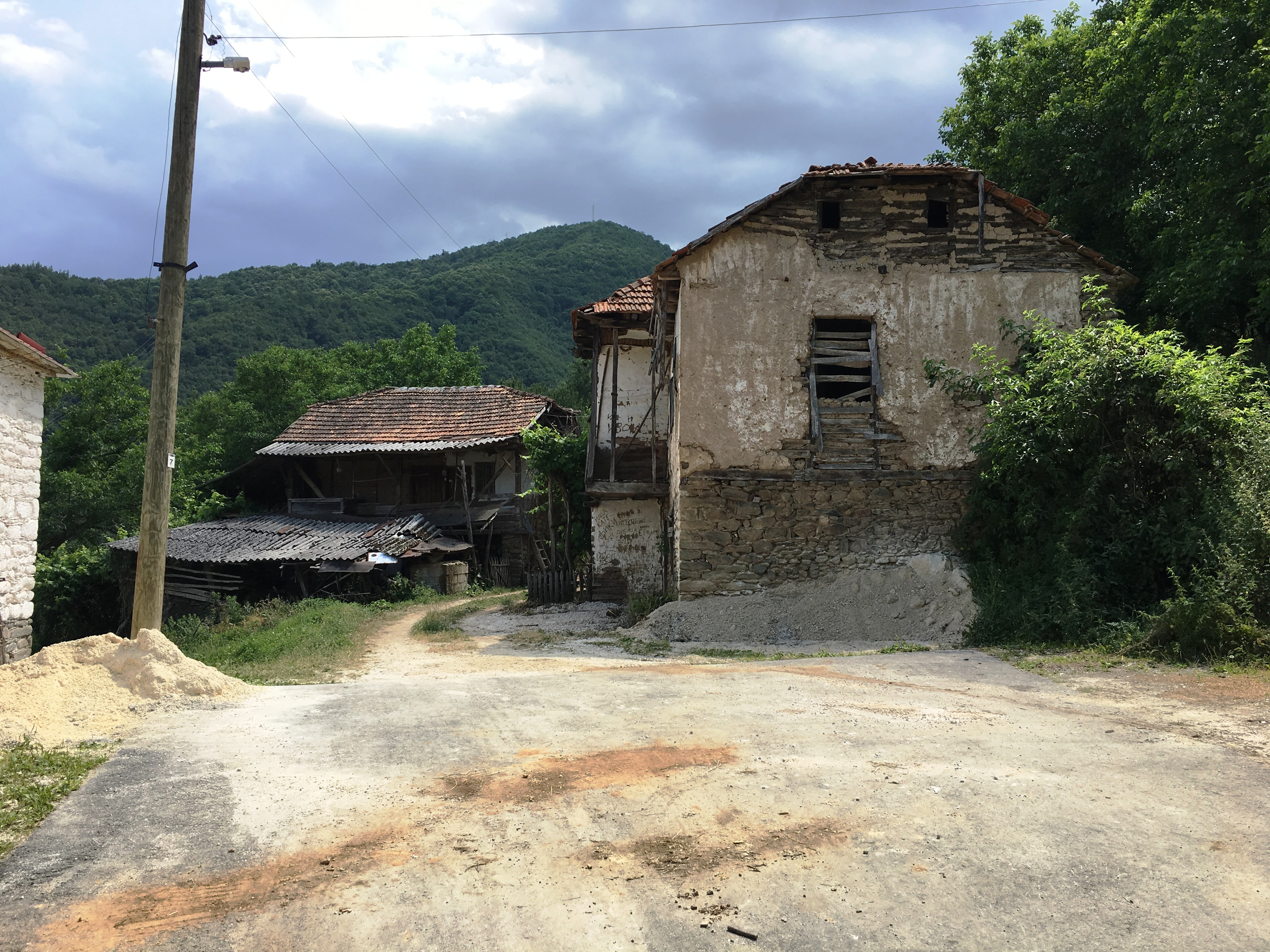
- Center of the village

- Location within North Macedonia
- Coordinates: 41°40′45″N 21°7′56″E
- Country: North Macedonia
- Region: Southwestern
- Municipality: Makedonski Brod
- Elevation: 660 m (2,170 ft)

Population (2002)
  - Total: 54
- Time zone: UTC+1 (CET)
  - Summer (DST): UTC+2 (CEST)

Kovač (Macedonian: Ковач) is a small village located in the region of Porece in the municipality of Makedonski Brod, North Macedonia. It used to be part of the former municipality of Samokov.

== Demographics ==
According to the 2002 census, the village had a total of 54 inhabitants. Ethnic groups in the village include:

- Macedonians 54
