= Kraljevac, Rovišće =

Kraljevac
- Village
- Location within Croatia
- Coordinates: 45.9782606°N 16.7197728°E
- Country: Croatia
- County: Bjelovar-Bilogora County
- Municipality: Rovišće

Area
  - Total: 3.1 sq mi (8.1 km^{2})

Population (2021)
  - Total: 405
  - Density: 130/sq mi (50/km^{2})
- Time zone: UTC+1 (CET)
  - Summer (DST): UTC+2 (CEST)

Kraljevac is a village in Croatia.

== Demographics ==
According to the 2021 census, its population was 405.
