= Kovačići, Olovo =

Village in Olovo, Bosnia and Herzegovina

Kovačići
- Village
- Location within Bosnia and Herzegovina
- Coordinates: 44.1863035°N 18.5324808°E
- Country: Bosnia and Herzegovina
- Entity: Federation of Bosnia and Herzegovina
- Canton: Zenica-Doboj
- Municipality: Olovo

Area
  - Total: 0.54 sq mi (1.39 km^{2})

Population (2013)
  - Total: 194
  - Density: 361/sq mi (140/km^{2})
- Time zone: UTC+1 (CET)
  - Summer (DST): UTC+2 (CEST)

Kovačići is a village in the municipality of Olovo, Bosnia and Herzegovina.

== Demographics ==
According to the 2013 census, its population was 194, all Bosniaks.
