= Kovačevac, Rovišće =

Kovačevac
- Village
- Location within Croatia
- Coordinates: 45.9794142°N 16.678183°E
- Country: Croatia
- County: Bjelovar-Bilogora County
- Municipality: Rovišće

Area
  - Total: 3.6 sq mi (9.3 km^{2})

Population (2021)
  - Total: 125
  - Density: 35/sq mi (13/km^{2})
- Time zone: UTC+1 (CET)
  - Summer (DST): UTC+2 (CEST)

Kovačevac is a village in Croatia.

== Demographics ==
According to the 2021 census, its population was 125.
