= Kovači, Raška =

Kovači (Raška)
- Village (Selo)
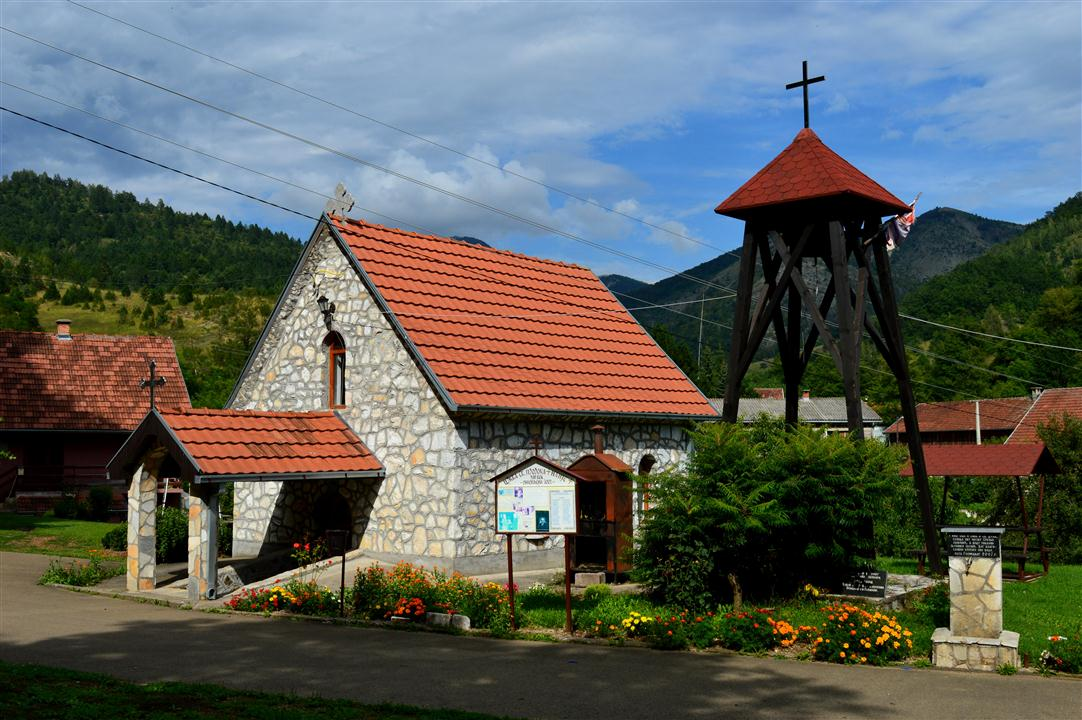
- The local church.

- Location within Serbia
- Coordinates: 43°25′N 20°44′E
- Country: Serbia
- District: Raška District
- Municipality: Raška

Population (2002)
  - Total: 283
- Time zone: UTC+1 (CET)
  - Summer (DST): UTC+2 (CEST)

Kovači is a village in the municipality of Raška, Serbia. According to the 2002 census, the village has a population of 283 people.
