= Kovačići, Zenica =

Kovačići Ковачићи
- Village
- Location within Bosnia and Herzegovina
- Coordinates: 44.2331414°N 18.0124526°E
- Country: Bosnia and Herzegovina
- Entity: Federation of Bosnia and Herzegovina
- Canton: Zenica-Doboj
- Municipality: Zenica

Area
  - Total: 1.93 sq mi (5.01 km^{2})

Population (2013)
  - Total: 228
  - Density: 118/sq mi (45.5/km^{2})
- Time zone: UTC+1 (CET)
  - Summer (DST): UTC+2 (CEST)

Kovačići is a village in the City of Zenica, Bosnia and Herzegovina.

== Demographics ==
According to the 2013 census, its population was 228.

Ethnicity in 2013
Ethnicity	Number	Percentage
Bosniaks	227	99.6%
other/undeclared	1	0.4%
Total	228	100%
