= Kovačevci, Glamoč =

Kovačevci
- Village
- Location within Bosnia and Herzegovina
- Coordinates: 44°03′59″N 16°50′07″E
- Country: Bosnia and Herzegovina
- Entity: Federation of Bosnia and Herzegovina
- Canton: Canton 10
- Municipality: Glamoč

Area
  - Total: 2.12 km^{2} (0.82 sq mi)

Population (2013)
  - Total: 203
  - Density: 95.8/km^{2} (248/sq mi)
- Time zone: UTC+1 (CET)
  - Summer (DST): UTC+2 (CEST)

Kovačevci is a village in the Municipality of Glamoč in Canton 10 of Federation of Bosnia and Herzegovina, an entity of Bosnia and Herzegovina.

== Demographics ==
According to the 2013 census, its population was 203.

Ethnicity in 2013
Ethnicity	Number	Percentage
Bosniaks	137	67.5%
Serbs	38	18.7%
Croats	28	13.8%
other/undeclared	0	0.0%
Total	203	100%

== Bibliography ==
- Ethnicity/National Affiliation, Religion and Mother Tongue (PDF). Sarajevo: Agency for Statistics of Bosnia and Herzegovina. 2019.
