= Kovačevo (Novi Pazar) =

Coordinates: 43°13′N 20°25′E

Kovačevo Ковачево
- Village (Selo)
- Interactive map of Kovačevo
- Country: Serbia
- District: Raška District
- Municipality: Novi Pazar
- Time zone: UTC+1 (CET)
  - Summer (DST): UTC+2 (CEST)

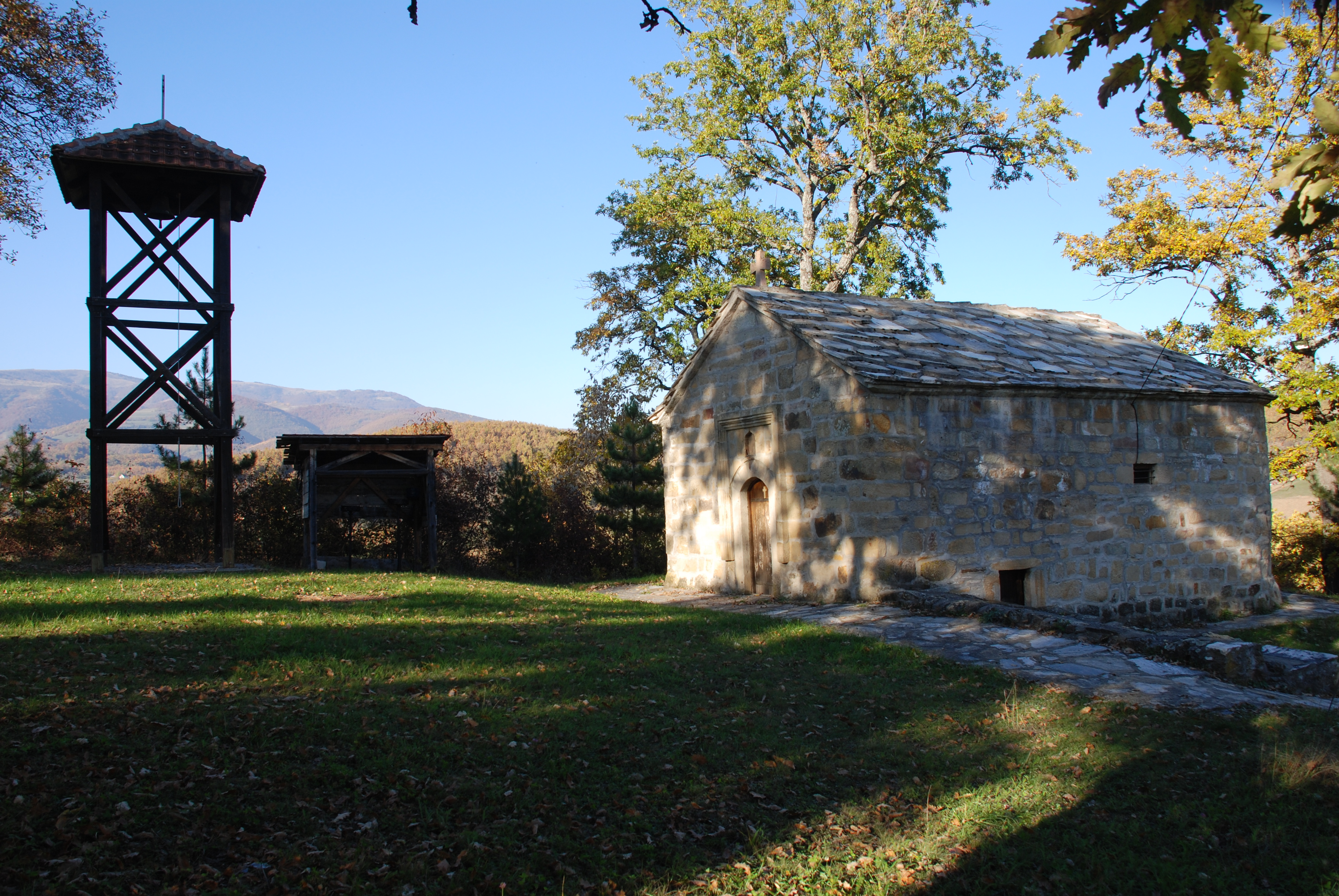

Kovačevo (Serbian Cyrillic: Ковачево) is a village situated in Novi Pazar municipality in Serbia.
