= Kovačica, Tuzla =

Kovačica
- Village
- Location within Bosnia and Herzegovina
- Coordinates: 44°33′45.13″N 18°47′20.29″E
- Country: Bosnia and Herzegovina
- Entity: Federation of Bosnia and Herzegovina
- Canton: Tuzla
- Municipality: Tuzla

Area
  - Total: 1.64 sq mi (4.24 km^{2})

Population (2013)
  - Total: 46
  - Density: 28/sq mi (11/km^{2})
- Time zone: UTC+1 (CET)
  - Summer (DST): UTC+2 (CEST)

Kovačica is a village in the municipality of Tuzla, Tuzla Canton, Bosnia and Herzegovina.

== Demographics ==
According to the 2013 census, its population was 46.

Ethnicity in 2013
Ethnicity	Number	Percentage
Serbs	41	89.1%
Bosniaks	2	4.3%
Croats	1	2.2%
other/undeclared	2	4.3%
Total	46	100%
