= Kovach, Stara Zagora Province =

Kovach Ковач
- Village
- Location in Bulgaria
- Coordinates: 42.2975°N 25.8409°E
- Country: Bulgaria
- Province: Stara Zagora Province
- Municipality: Radnevo
- Time zone: UTC+2 (EET)
  - Summer (DST): UTC+3 (EEST)

Kovach (Bulgarian: Ковач) is a village in the municipality of Radnevo, in Stara Zagora Province, Bulgaria.
