= Kovak (band) =

Background information
- Origin: Brighton, England
- Genres: Electro Pop
- Members: Annelies Van de Velde; Karl Bray; Darren Bray
- Past members: Jonny Scafidi; Richard Gregory
- Website: kovak.co.uk

Kovak are a British band based in Brighton. The band originally consisted of Annelies 'Abby' Van de Velde (vocals), Karl Bray (guitars), Darren Bray (drums) and Jonny Scafidi (bass & cello). Scafidi left the band in 2015.

The band have performed several times at Toronto’s NXNE festival and were voted "Top 10 Critics Choice" of NXNE by Now Magazine as well as appearing live on CP24′s Noon Show in front of 1.4 million viewers.
