= Rovišće =

- Municipality
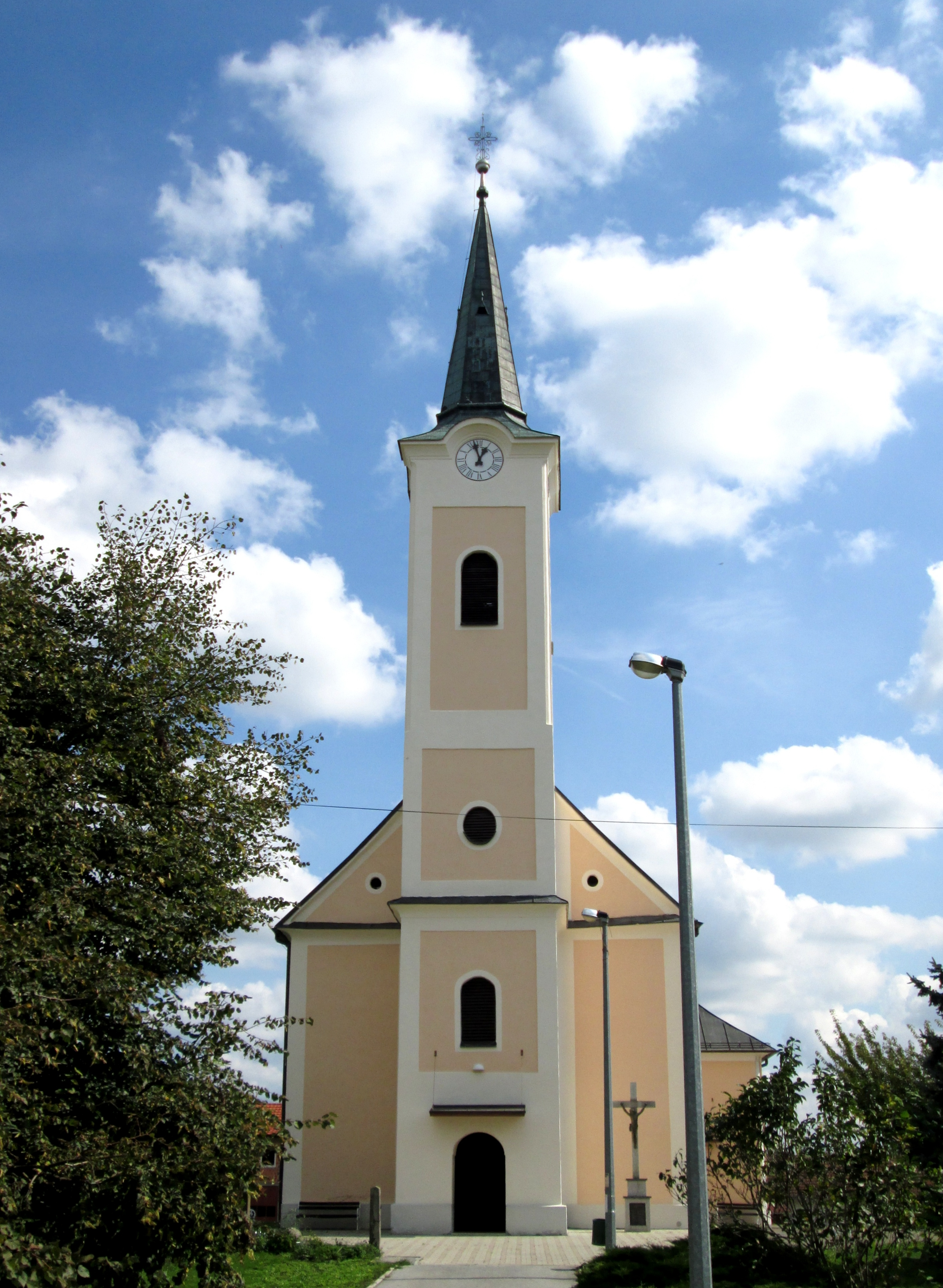
- Catholic Church of Holy Trinity in Rovišće, Croatia
- Interactive map of Rovišće
- Location within Croatia
- Country: Croatia
- County: Bjelovar-Bilogora County

Government
  - Mayor: Slavko Prišćan (HNS)

Area
  - Municipality: 30.4 sq mi (78.8 km^{2})
  - Urban: 4.0 sq mi (10.3 km^{2})

Population (2021)
  - Municipality: 4,144
  - Density: 136/sq mi (52.6/km^{2})
  - Urban: 1,033
  - Urban density: 260/sq mi (100/km^{2})
- Time zone: UTC+1 (CET)
  - Summer (DST): UTC+2 (CEST)
- Website: opcina-rovisce.hr

Rovišće (Hungarian: Rojcsa or Riucsevár, Czech: Roviště, Latin: Rvucha) is a settlement and a municipality in Bjelovar-Bilogora County, Croatia.

== Geography ==
The settlement of Rovišće, which is the administrative seat of the municipality of the same name, is located 12 km from Bjelovar to the west, and 72 km from Zagreb. Rovišće is directly located on the traffic route Bjelovar - Zagreb. Rovišće lies on the south-western slopes of Bilogora a low mountainous range in Croatia.

Velika a tributary of the river Česma flows 2 km west of Rovišće, and its subsequent tributaries of Konjska rijeka and Rijeka surround the settlement.

== Demographics ==
According to the 2021 census, the population of the municipality was 4,144 with 1,033 living in the town proper. In 2011, there were 4,822 inhabitants, 1,196 in the village itself, of which 97% are Croats.

The municipality consists of the following settlements:

- Domankuš, population 220
- Gornje Rovišće, population 75
- Kakinac, population 45
- Kovačevac, population 125
- Kraljevac, population 405
- Lipovčani, population 49
- Podgorci, population 367
- Predavac, population 1144
- Prekobrdo, population 93
- Rovišće, population 1033
- Tuk, population 288
- Žabjak, population 300
Rovišće: Population trends 1857–2021
v

population	3201	3273	3278	4082	4380	4554	4498	4942	4973	5183	5285	5209	5016	4968	5262	4822	4144
	1857	1869	1880	1890	1900	1910	1921	1931	1948	1953	1961	1971	1981	1991	2001	2011	2021

Sources: Croatian Bureau of Statistics publications
