= Kovači, Kotor =

Kovači Ковачи
- Village
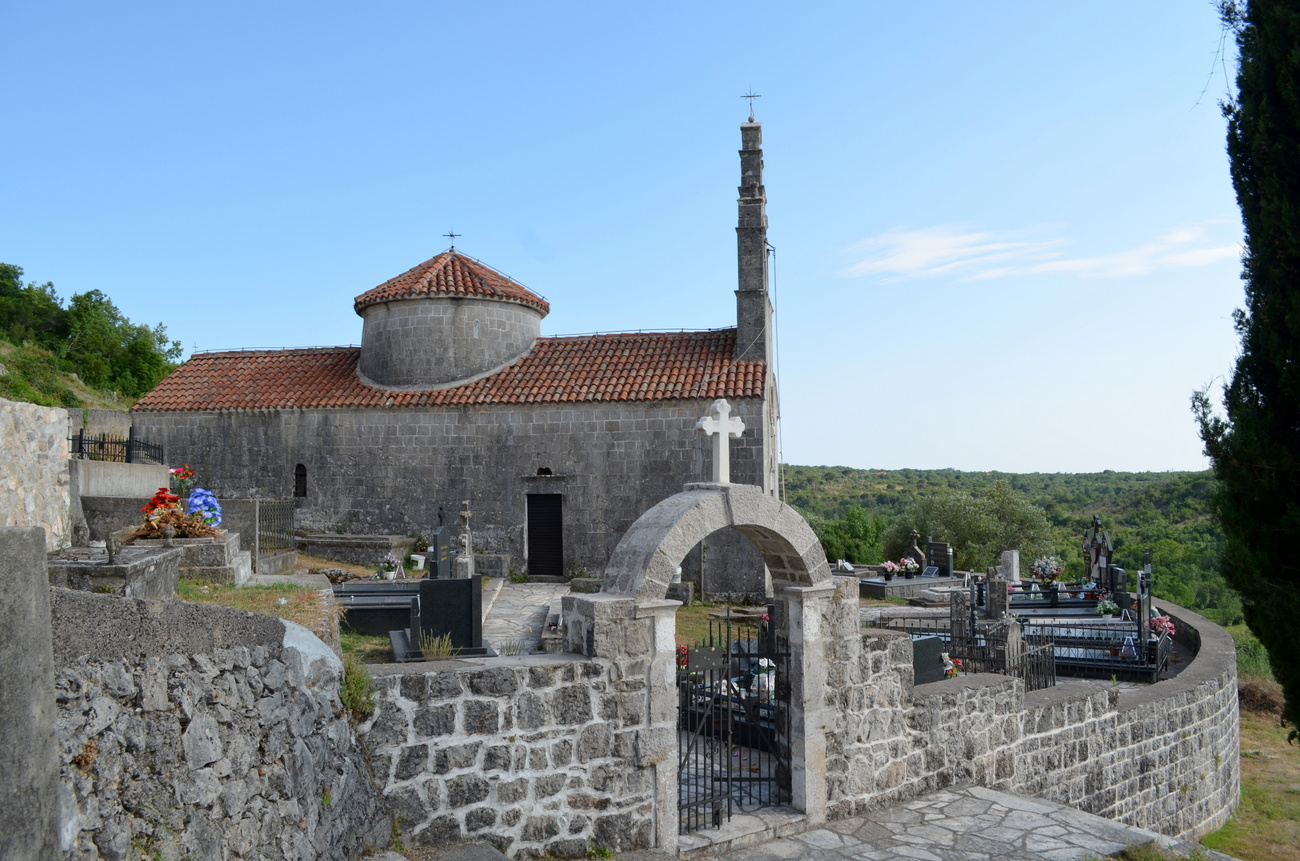
- The church in Kovači

- Location within Montenegro
- Coordinates: 42.315711°N 18.768266°E
- Country: Montenegro
- Municipality: Kotor

Population (2011)
  - Total: 108
- Time zone: UTC+1 (CET)
  - Summer (DST): UTC+2 (CEST)

Kovači (Serbian Cyrillic: Ковачи) is a small village in the municipality of Kotor, Montenegro.

== Demographics ==
According to the 2011 census, its population was 108.

Ethnicity in 2011
Ethnicity	Number	Percentage
Serbs	75	69.4%
Montenegrins	19	17.6%
other/undeclared	14	13.0%
Total	108	100%
