= Kovač (Jičín District) =

- Municipality
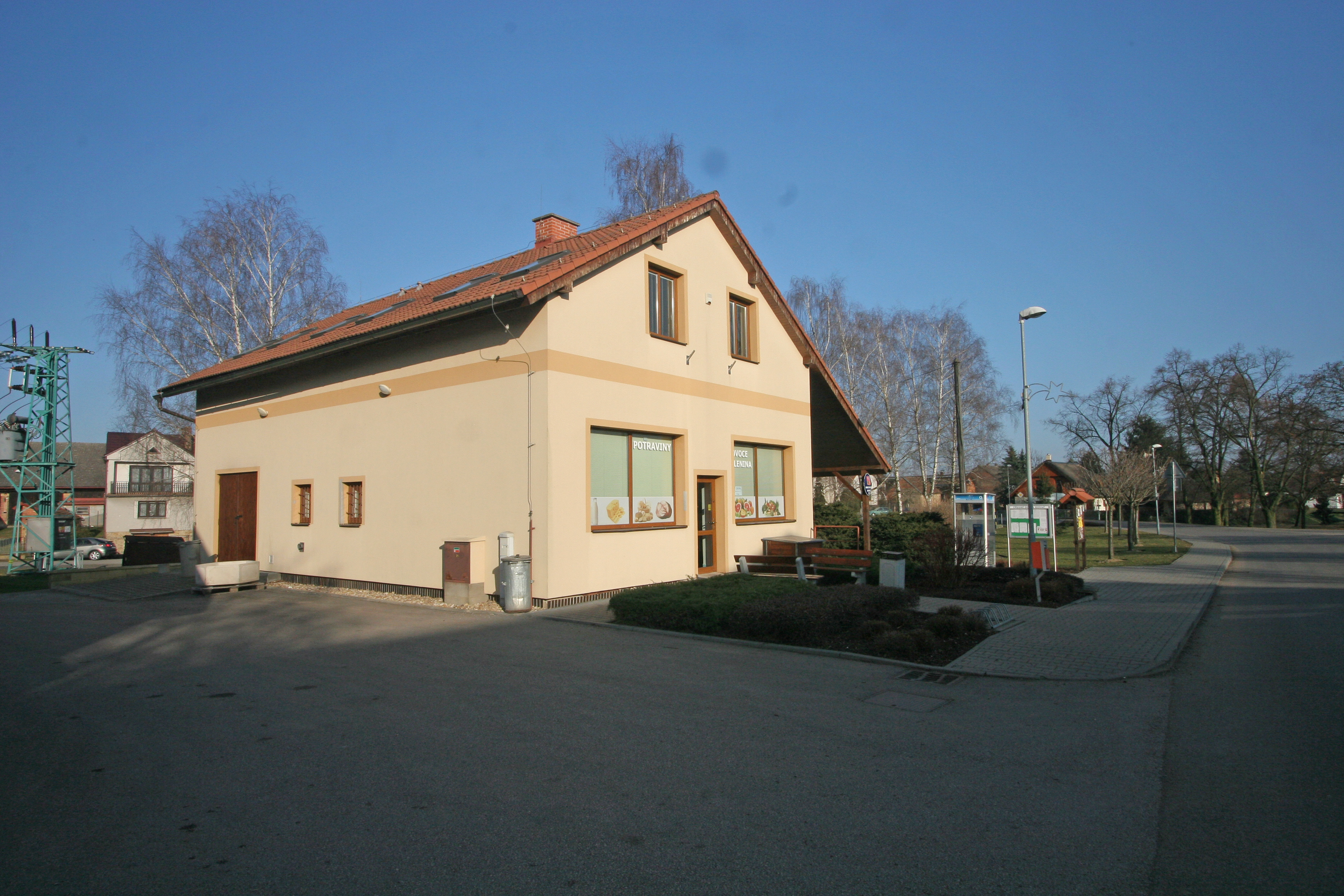
- Municipal office

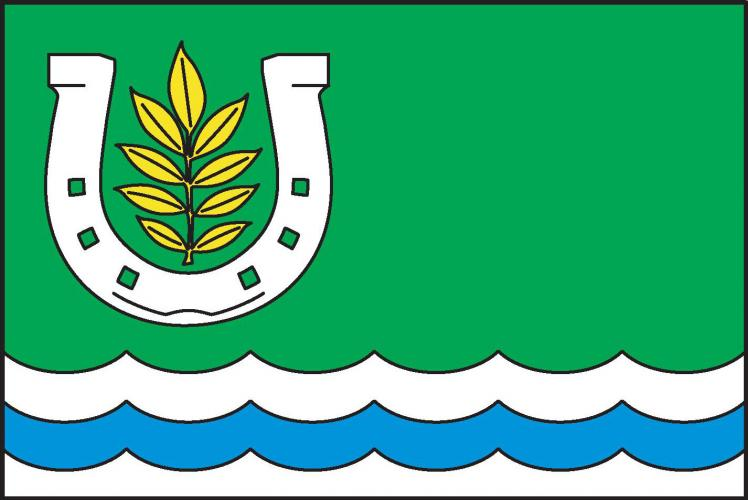
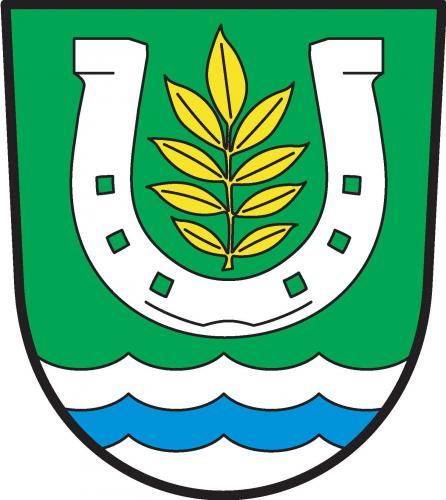
- Flag Coat of arms

- Location in the Czech Republic
- Coordinates: 50°23′46″N 15°28′15″E
- Country: Czech Republic
- Region: Hradec Králové
- District: Jičín
- First mentioned: 1318

Area
  - Total: 7.73 km^{2} (2.98 sq mi)
- Elevation: 265 m (869 ft)

Population (2026-01-01)
  - Total: 147
  - Density: 19.0/km^{2} (49.3/sq mi)
- Time zone: UTC+1 (CET)
  - Summer (DST): UTC+2 (CEST)
- Postal code: 506 01
- Website: www.kovac-obec.cz

Kovač is a municipality and village in Jičín District in the Hradec Králové Region of the Czech Republic. It has about 100 inhabitants.

== Demographics ==
Historical population
Year	Pop.	±%
1869	328	—
1880	361	+10.1%
1890	331	−8.3%
1900	336	+1.5%
1910	316	−6.0%
1921	297	−6.0%
1930	291	−2.0%
1950	248	−14.8%
1961	210	−15.3%
1970	198	−5.7%
1980	155	−21.7%
1991	100	−35.5%
2001	113	+13.0%
2011	127	+12.4%
2021	137	+7.9%
Source: Censuses

== Notable people ==
- Carl Patsch (1865–1945), Slavist, Albanologist, archaeologist and historian
