= Kraljevci =

Kraljevci may refer to:

- Kraljevci, Serbia
- Kraljevci, Slovenia
