= Kovač, Pljevlja =

Coordinates: 42°58′7″N 18°30′13″E

Kovač Ковач
- Village
- Location within Montenegro
- Country: Montenegro
- Municipality: Pljevlja

Population (2011)
  - Total: 20
- Time zone: UTC+1 (CET)
  - Summer (DST): UTC+2 (CEST)

Kovač (Serbian Cyrillic: Ковач), formerly known as Kovaci, is a small village in the municipality of Pljevlja, Montenegro.

== Demographics ==
According to the 2003 census, the village had a population of 34 people.

According to the 2011 census, its population was 20.

Ethnicity in 2011
Ethnicity	Number	Percentage
Serbs	18	90.0%
other/undeclared	2	10.0%
Total	20	100%
