= Kováč =

Kováč (pronounced: KO-vahch), feminine: Kováčová, is a surname in Slovakia.

It may refer to:

Kováč

- Dušan Kováč (born 1942), Slovak historian
- Ervín Kováč (1911–1972), Slovak footballer
- Igor Kováč (born 1969), Slovak athlete
- Ivan Kováč (1948-2023), Slovak athlete
- Maroš Kováč (born 1977), Slovak cyclist
- Michal Kováč (1930–2016), President of Slovakia
- Pavel Kováč (born 1974), Slovak footballer
- Radoslav Kováč (born 1979), Czech footballer
- Tibor Kováč (1905–1952), Slovak Jewish activist
- Vladimír Kováč (born 1991), Slovak footballer

Kováčová

- Alena Kováčová (born 1978), Slovak basketball player
- Emília Kováčová (1931–2020), First Lady of Slovakia
- Ivana Kováčová (born 1992), Slovak gymnast
- Kateřina Kováčová (born 1982), Czech poet
- Lenka Kováčová (born 1966), Czech rower
