= Kotor Municipality =

Kotor Municipality Opština Kotor Општина Котор
- Municipality
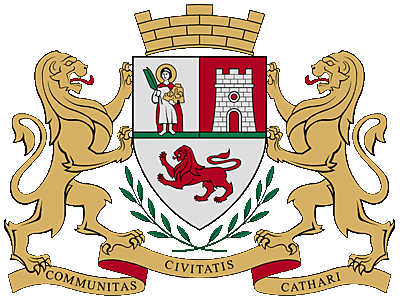
- Coat of arms

- Kotor Municipality in Montenegro
- Country: Montenegro
- Seat: Kotor

Area
  - Total: 335 km^{2} (129 sq mi)

Population (2023)
  - Total: 13,347
  - Density: 39.8/km^{2} (103/sq mi)
- Area code: +382 32
- Vehicle registration: KO
- Website: www.kotor.me

Kotor Municipality (Montenegrin: Opština Kotor / Општина Котор) is one of the municipalities of Montenegro. Its administrative center is Kotor. This municipality is located in the southwestern part of Montenegro, and includes 56 recognized settlements, as well as the innermost portion of the Bay of Kotor.

== Location and tourism ==
The Kotor municipality is located on the Bay of Kotor region on the Adriatic coast, surrounding the town of Kotor in southwestern Montenegro. Kotor is connected to the Adriatic Highway and the rest of the coast and inland Montenegro by the Vrmac Tunnel. The inland is reachable by detouring from the Adriatic highway in Budva or Sutomore (through the Sozina tunnel). There is also a historic road connecting Kotor to Cetinje, which has views of the Kotor Bay. Since the early 2000s Kotor has seen an increase in tourists, many of them coming by cruise ship. Visitors are attracted by the natural environment of the Gulf of Kotor and by the old town of Kotor. Kotor is part of the World Heritage Site dubbed the Natural and Culturo-Historical Region of Kotor. The municipality is home to numerous sights, such as the Cathedral of Saint Tryphon in the old town (built in 1166), and the ancient walls which stretch for 4.5 km (3 mi) directly above the town. Sveti Đorđe and Gospa od Škrpijela islets off the coast of Perast are also among the tourist destinations in the vicinity of Kotor. The best known settlements along the Kotor municipality are the municipal seat Kotor, Risan, Radanovići, Škaljari, Perast, Dobrota and Prčanj.

=== City Assembly (2024–2028) ===
Party/Coalition	Seats	Local government
DPS	10 / 33	TBD
DCG	8 / 33	TBD
ZBCG (NSD)	3 / 33	TBD
Democratic alternative	3 / 33	TBD
Grbalj list	3 / 33	TBD
PES	2 / 33	TBD
ES (SD/SDP/LP)	2 / 33	TBD
HGI	1 / 33	TBD
Kotor movement	1 / 33	TBD

== Demographics ==
The 2011 census recorded a total population of 22,601. The inhabitants included Montenegrins, numbering 11,047 (48.88%); Serbs, numbering 6,910 (30.57%); Croats, numbering 1,553 (6.87%); with the rest belonging to other ethnic groups (1,145, 5.07%) or opting undeclared (1,946, 8.61%). By language, 38.46% spoke Montenegrin, while 42.37% spoke Serbian. Major religious affiliations included Eastern Orthodoxy (78.02%) and Roman Catholicism (11.76%). The 2023 census recorded a total population of 22,746.

Kotor (2023)
Montenegrins	46.43%
Serbs	35.12%
Croats	5.73%
Undeclared	5.29%
Others	7.43%

Kotor (2023)
Eastern Orthodoxy	79.72%
Roman Catholicism	10.12%
Muslims	1.46%
Undeclared	3.90%
Others	4.8%

Kotor (2023)
Montenegrin	39.33%
Serbian	43.63%
Croatian	2.34%
Serbo-Croatian	4.73%
Undeclared	2.96%
Others	7.01%

== Gallery ==
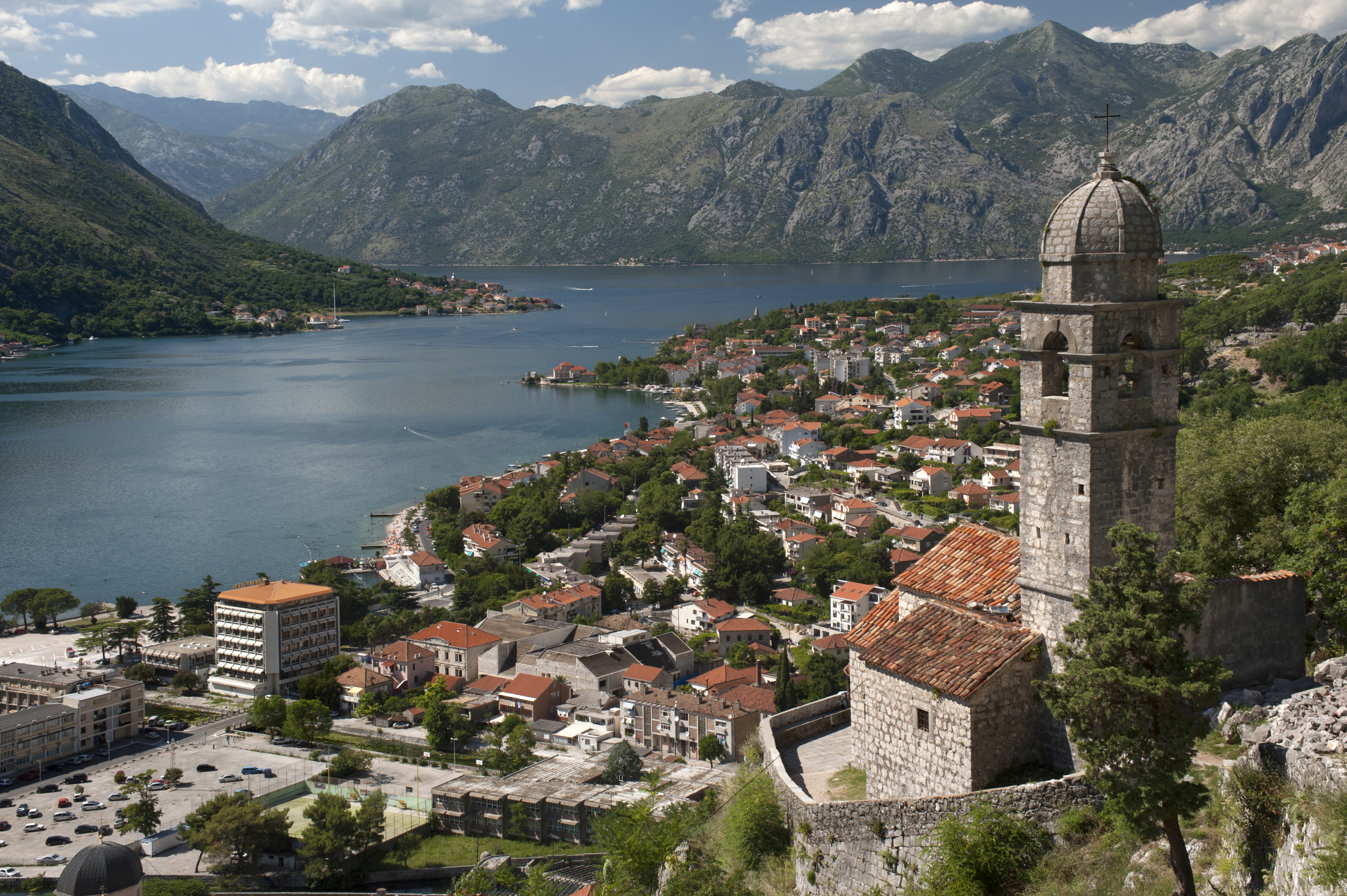
Town of Kotor

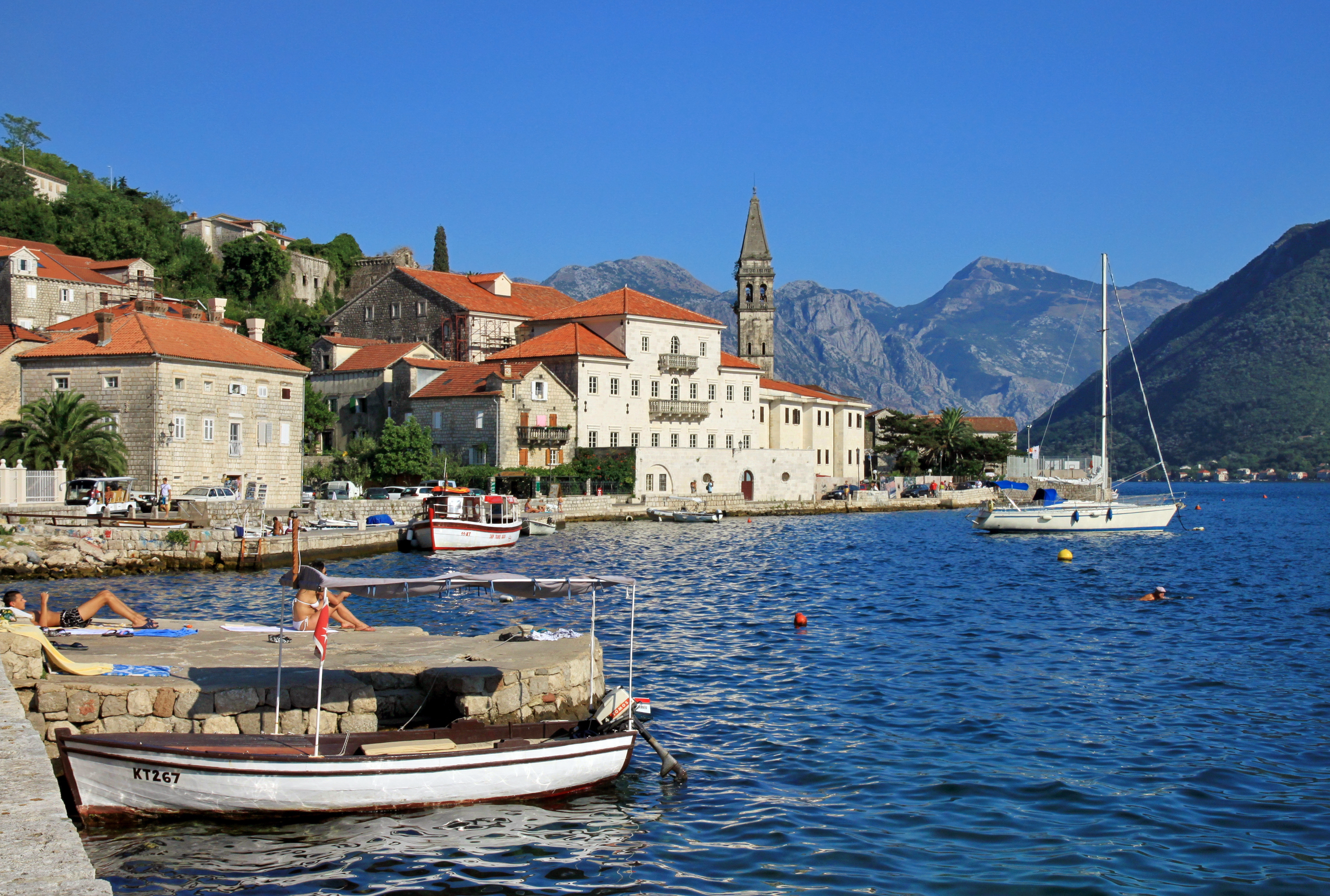
Town of Perast

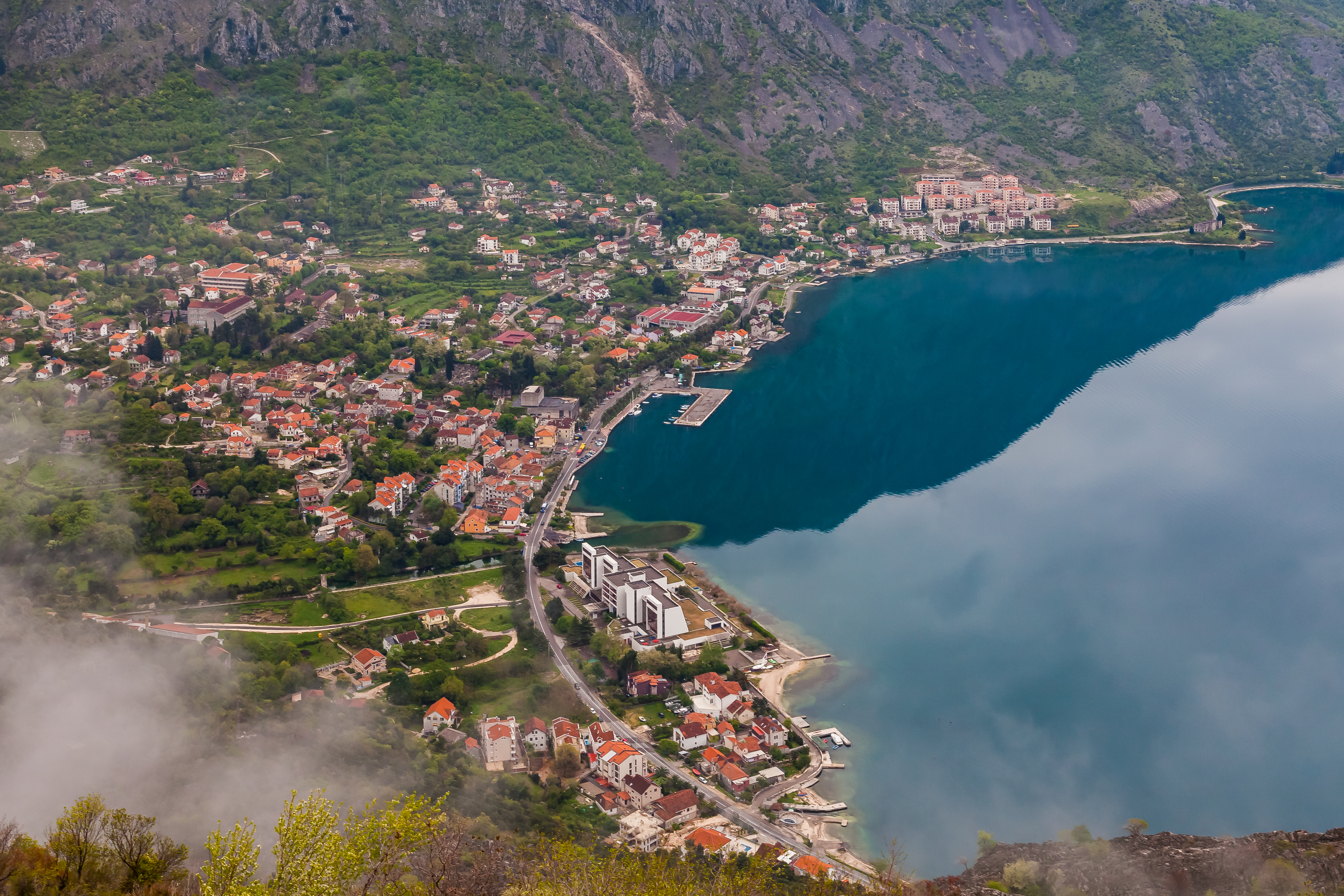
Town of Risan

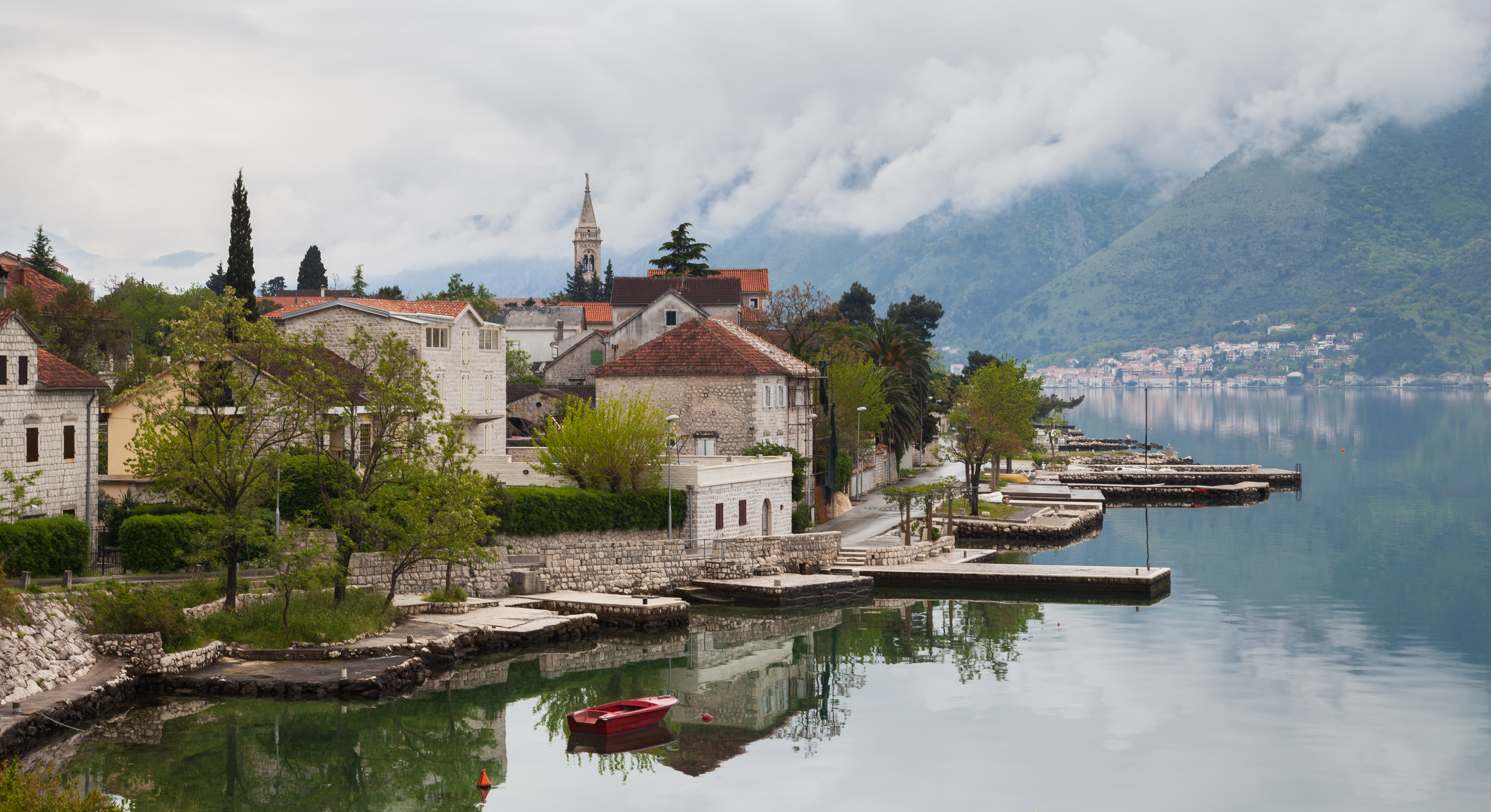
Town of Dobrota

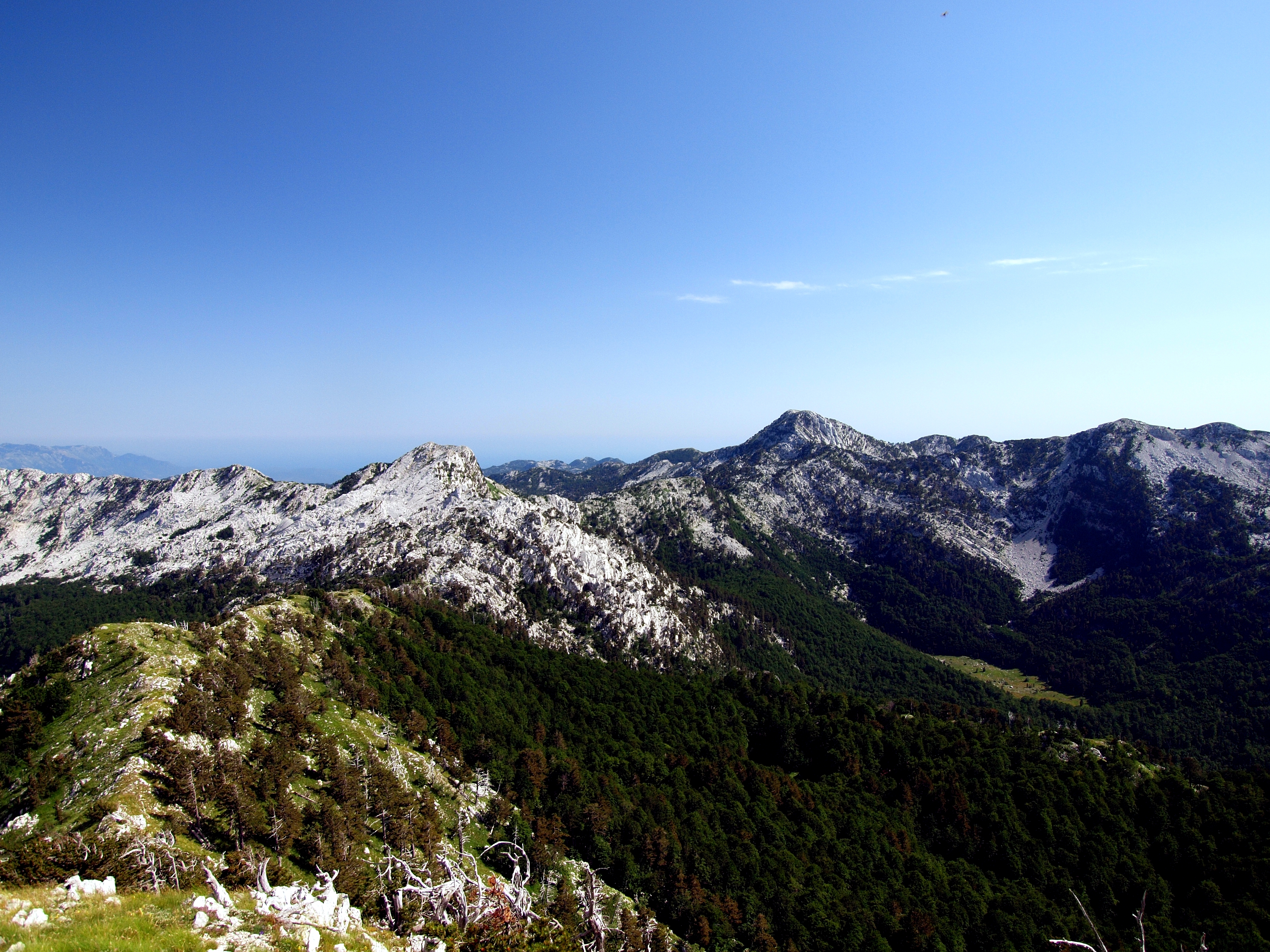
Orjen mountain

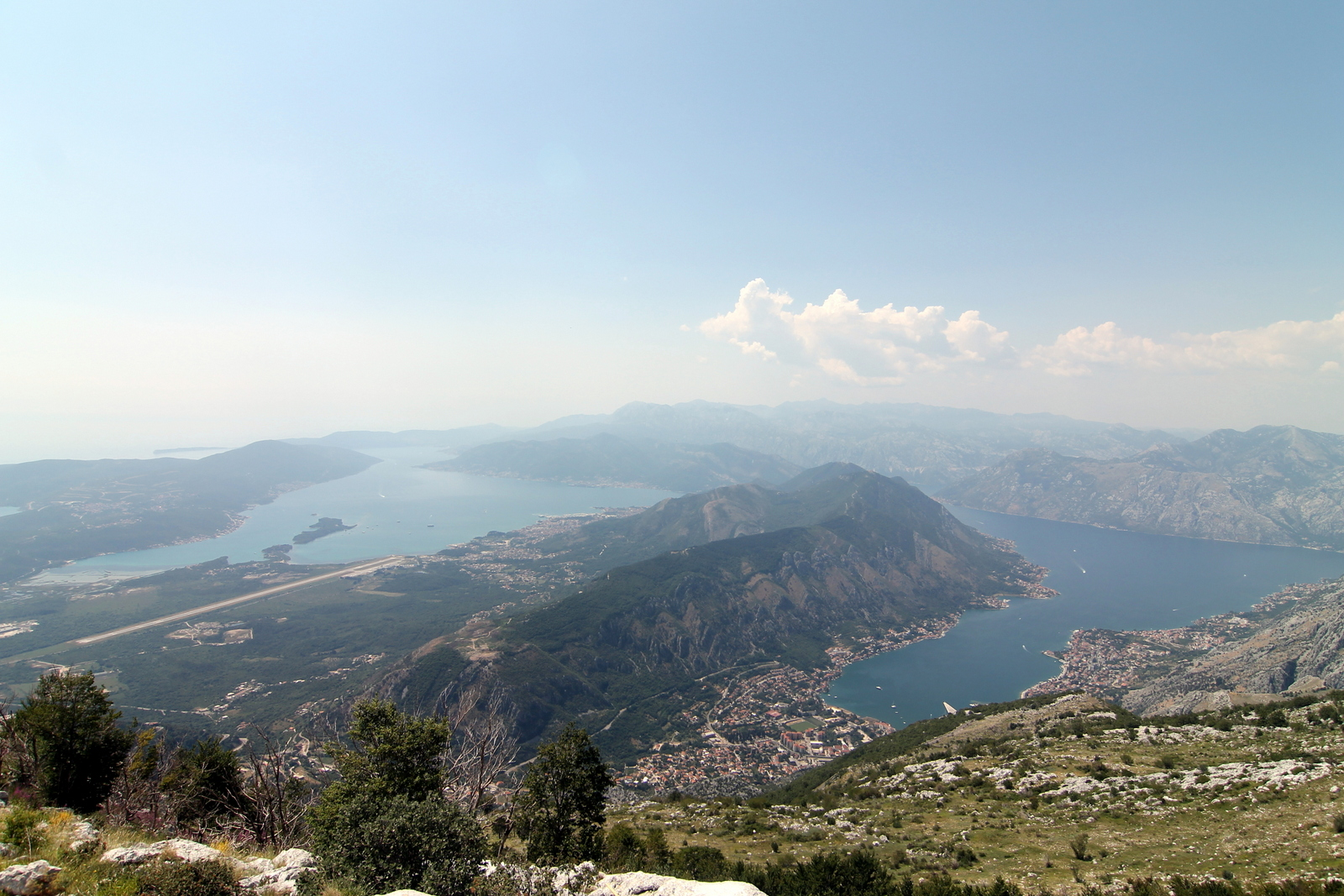
Vrmac mountain

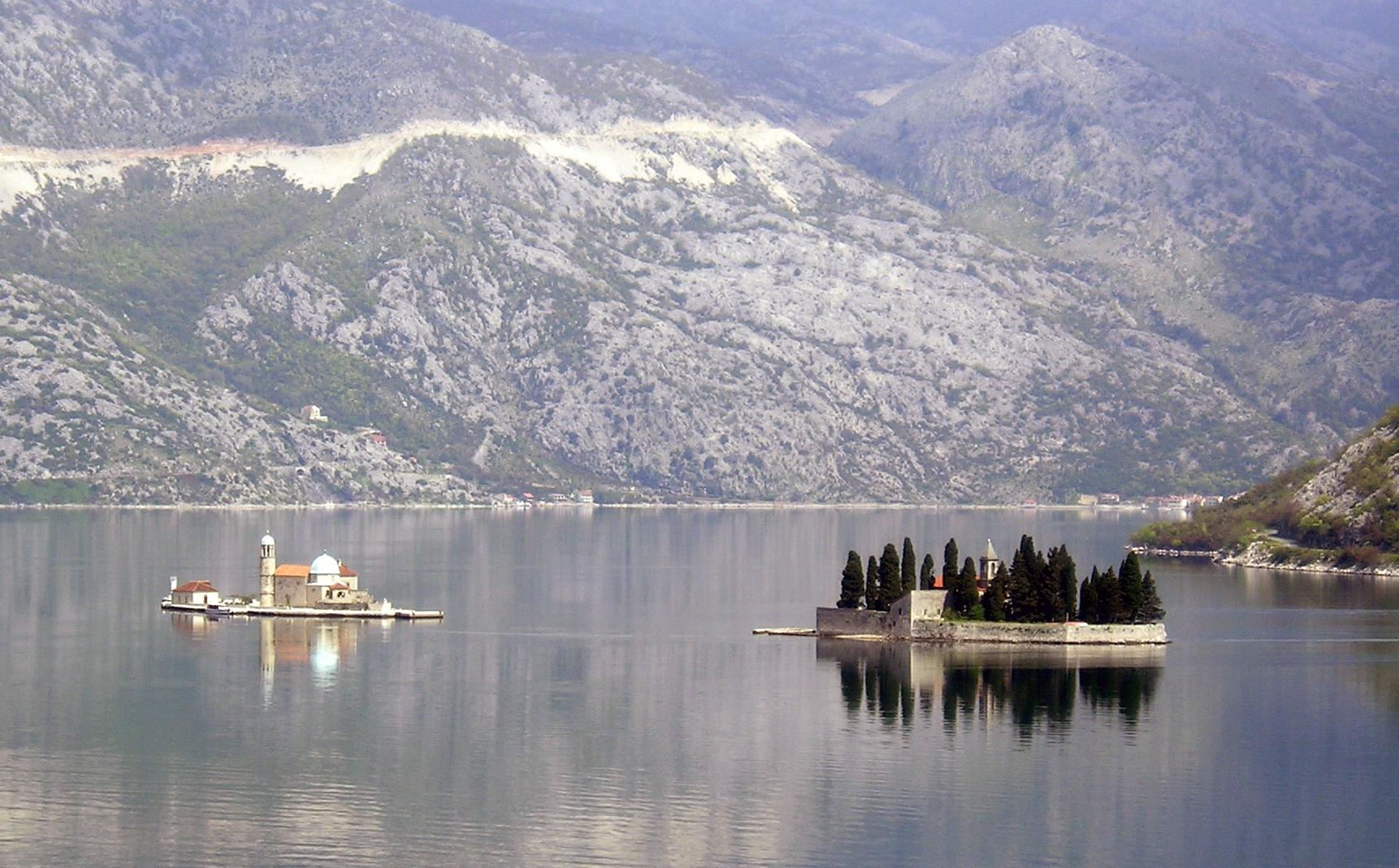
Our Lady of the Rocks

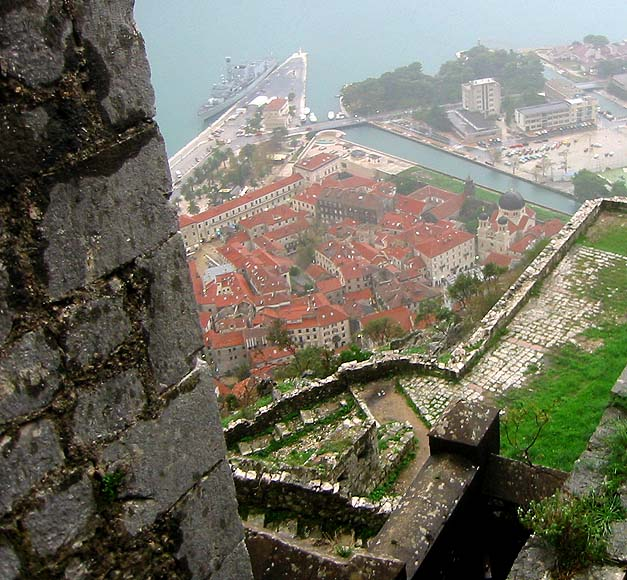
Old Town of Kotor
