= Kováčovce =

Kováčovce Szécsénykovácsi
- Municipality
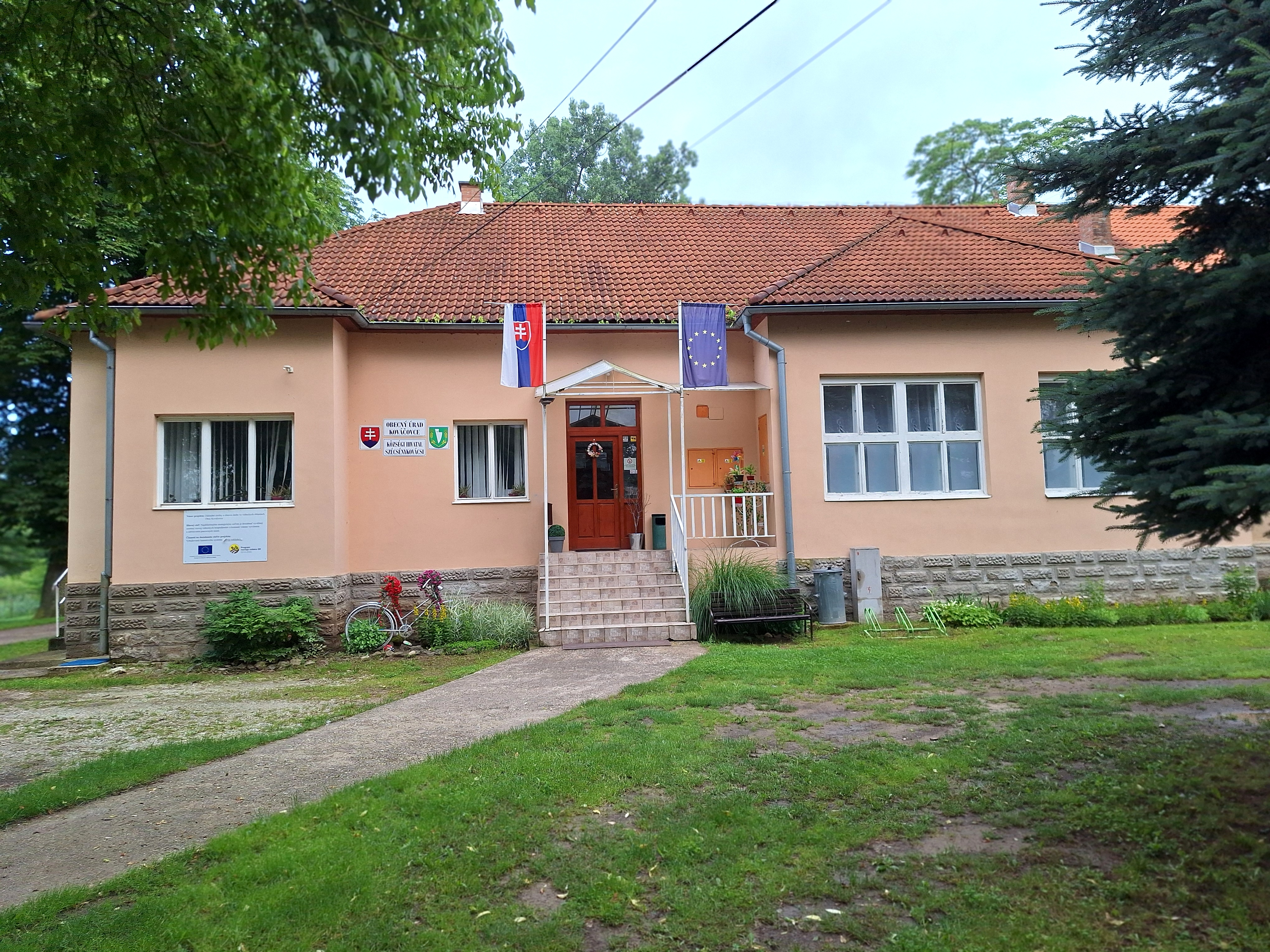

- Flag

- Location of Kováčovce in the Banská Bystrica Region Location of Kováčovce in Slovakia
- Coordinates: 48.10°N 19.47°E
- Country: Slovakia
- Region: Banská Bystrica Region
- District: Veľký Krtíš District
- First mentioned: 1295

Area
  - Total: 11.56 km^{2} (4.46 sq mi)
- Elevation: 150 m (490 ft)

Population (2025)
  - Total: 294
- Time zone: UTC+1 (CET)
  - Summer (DST): UTC+2 (CEST)
- Postal code: 991 31
- Area code: +421 47
- Vehicle registration plate (until 2022): VK
- Website: kovacovce.sk

Kováčovce (Hungarian: Szécsénykovácsi) is a village and municipality in the Veľký Krtíš District of the Banská Bystrica Region of southern Slovakia.

== Geography ==
The municipality lies at an altitude of 150 metres (490 ft) and covers an area of 11.56 km^{2} (4.46 sq mi) (2025).

== Population ==
Population statistic (10 years)
Year	1995	2005	2015	2025
Count	407	372	362	294
Difference		−8.59%	−2.68%	−18.78%

Population statistic
Year	2024	2025
Count	300	294
Difference		−2%

It has a population of 294 people (31 December 2025).

=== Ethnicity ===
Census 2021 (1+ %)
Ethnicity	Number	Fraction
Hungarian	184	57.86%
Slovak	153	48.11%
Not found out	10	3.14%
Other	4	1.25%
Total	318	

In year 2021 was 318 people by ethnicity 184 as Hungarian, 153 as Slovak, 10 as Not found out and 4 as Other.

Note on population: The difference values of population numbers in the table "Population statistic" and in the sections "Ethnicity" & "Religion" is caused by the use of various statistical methods.

=== Religion ===
Census 2021 (1+ %)
Religion	Number	Fraction
Roman Catholic Church	195	61.32%
Evangelical Church	65	20.44%
None	44	13.84%
Not found out	5	1.57%
Total	318	

In year 2021 was 318 people by religion 195 from Roman Catholic Church, 65 from Evangelical Church, 44 from None, 5 from Not found out, 3 from Old Catholic Church, 2 from United Methodist Church, 1 from Calvinist Church, 1 from Other and not ascertained christian church, 1 from Greek Catholic Church and 1 from Buddhism.

== Genealogical resources ==
The records for genealogical research are available at the state archive "Statny Archiv in Banska Bystrica, Slovakia"

- Roman Catholic church records (births/marriages/deaths): 1748-1919 (parish B)
- Lutheran church records (births/marriages/deaths): 1745-1931 (parish B)

== See also ==
- List of municipalities and towns in Slovakia
