= Kovačice =

- Village (Selo)
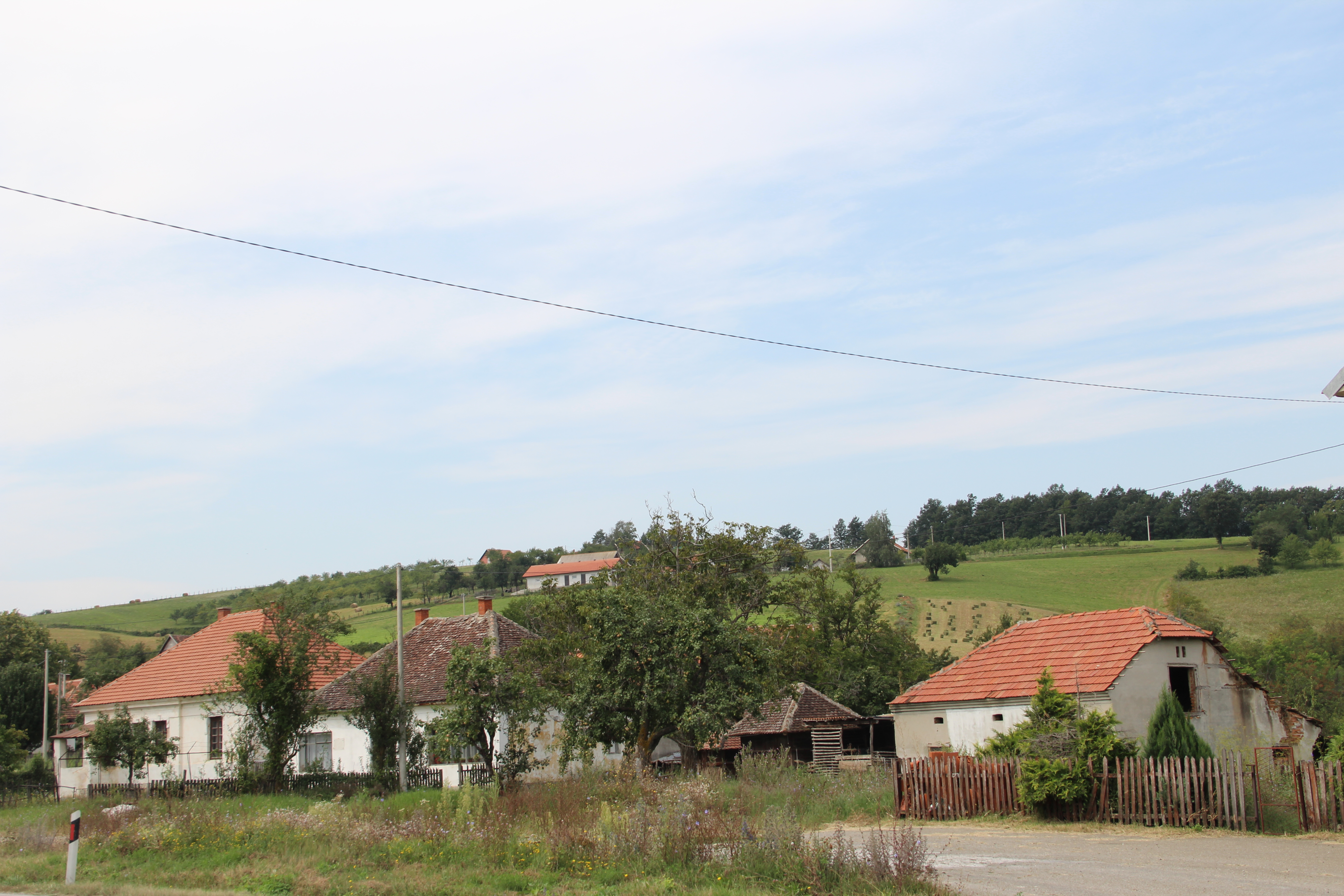
- Kovačice

- Location within Serbia
- Coordinates: 44°12′N 19°52′E
- Country: Serbia
- District: Kolubara District
- Municipality: Valjevo

Population (2002)
  - Total: 203
- Time zone: UTC+1 (CET)
  - Summer (DST): UTC+2 (CEST)

Kovačice is a village in the municipality of Valjevo, Serbia. According to the 2002 census, the village has a population of 203 people.

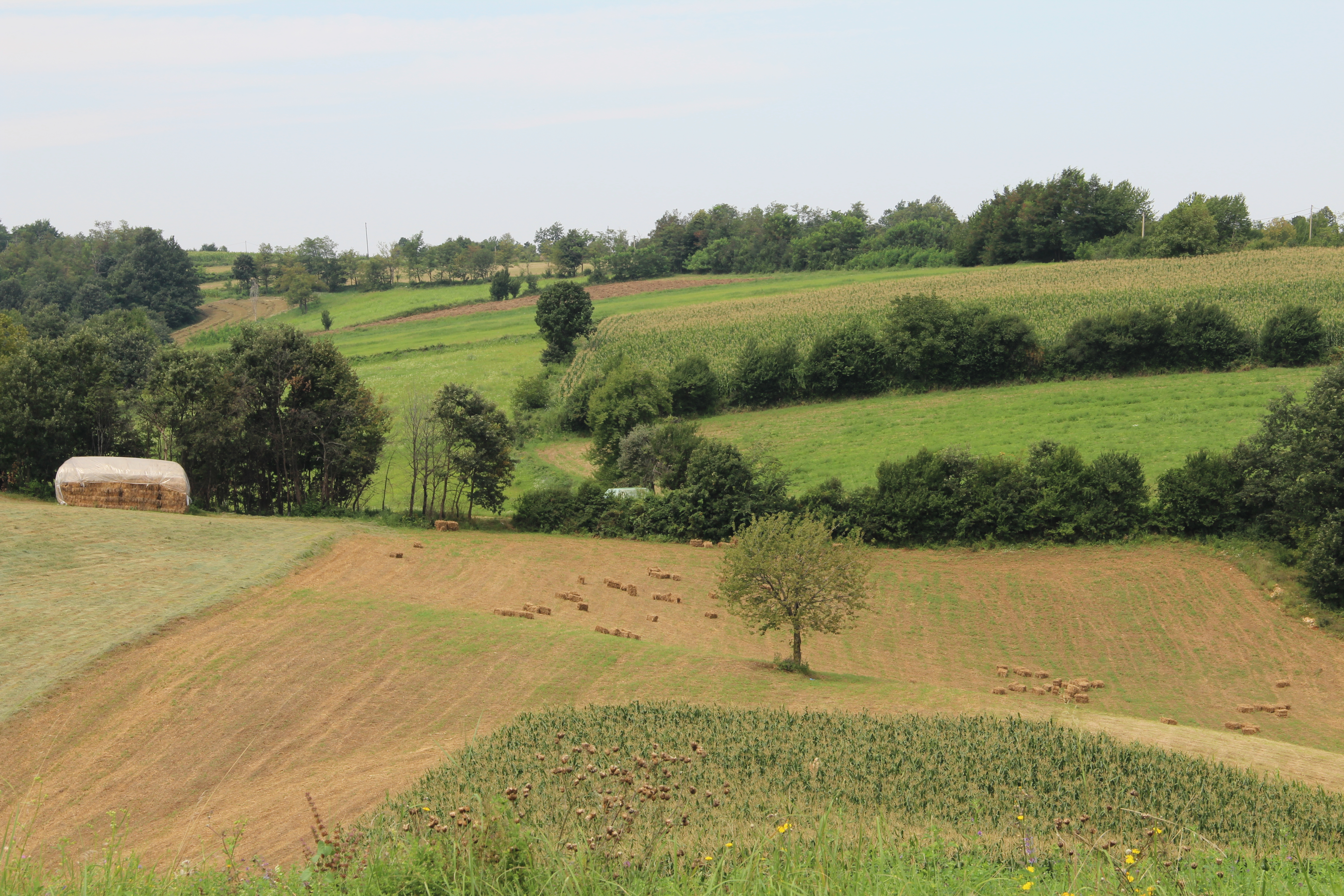
Kovačice - panorama

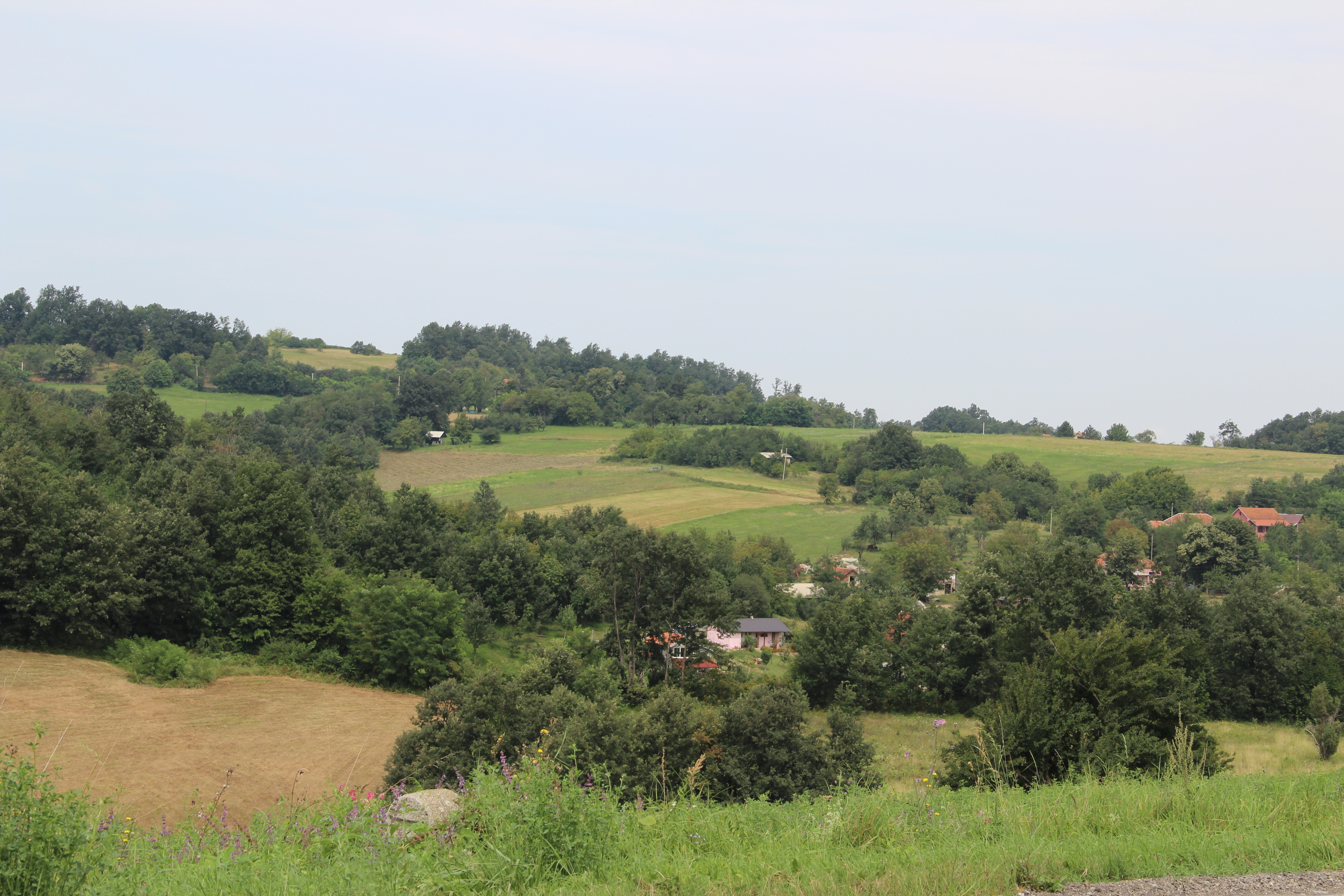
Kovačice - panorama

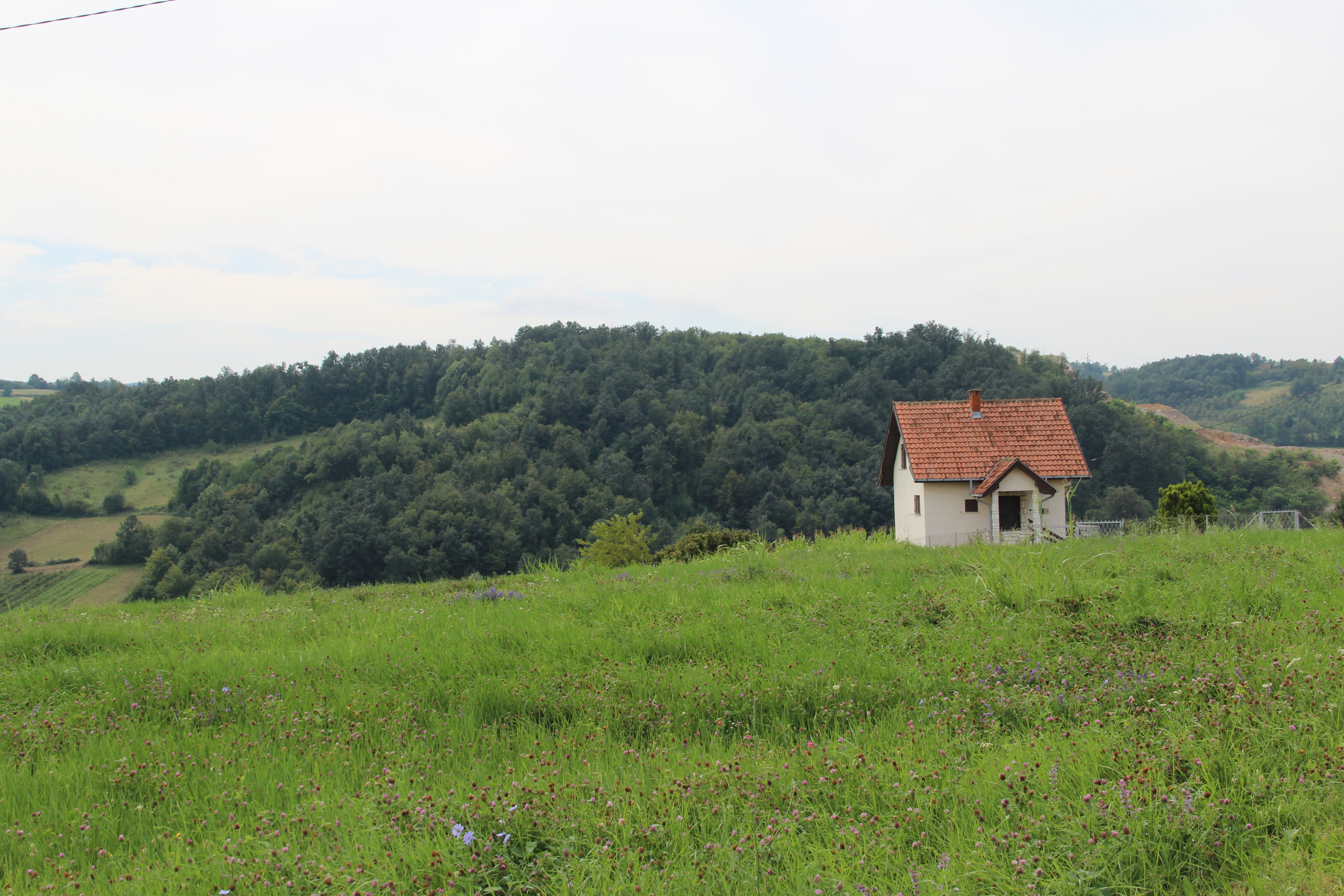
Kovačice - panorama

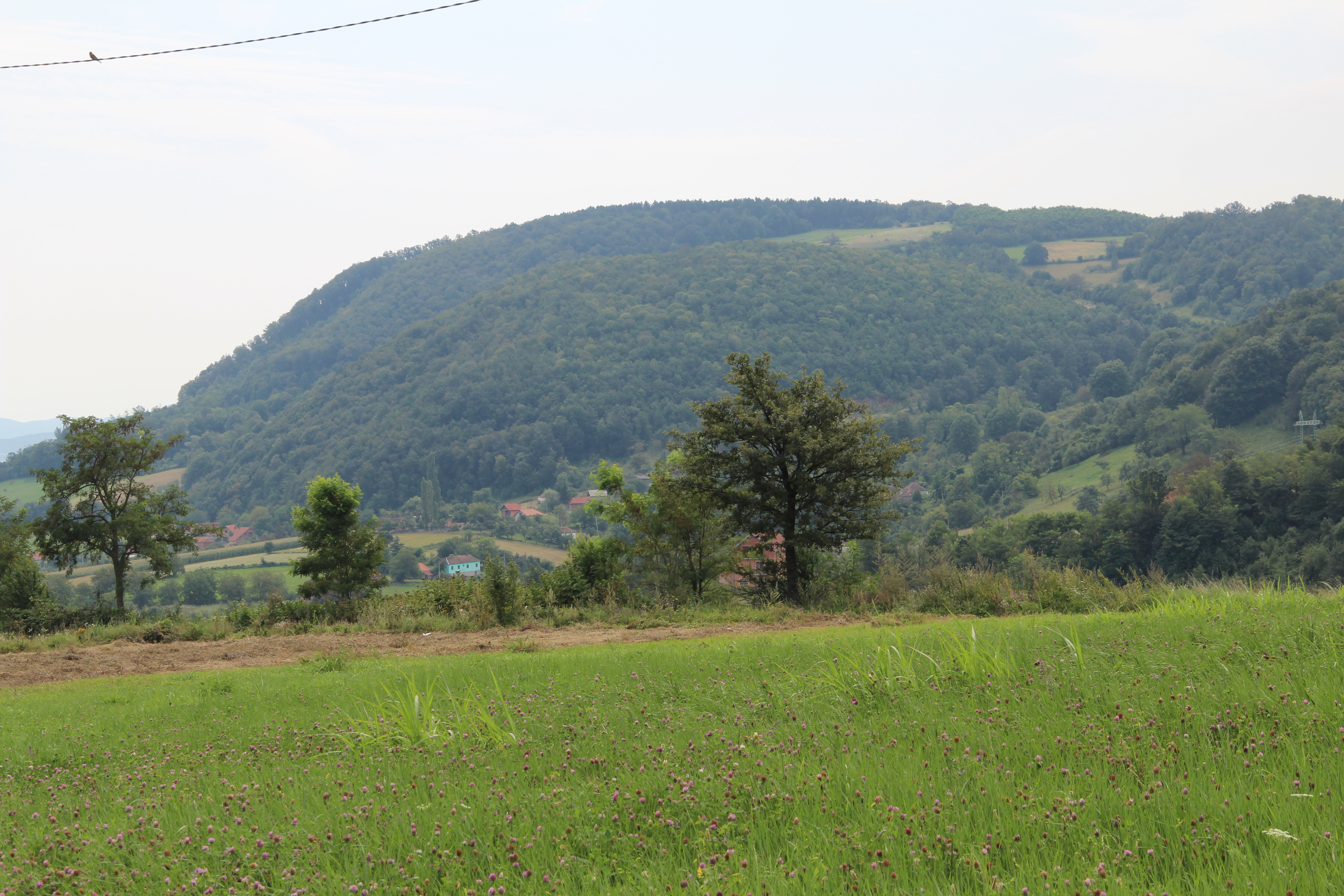
Kovačice - panorama

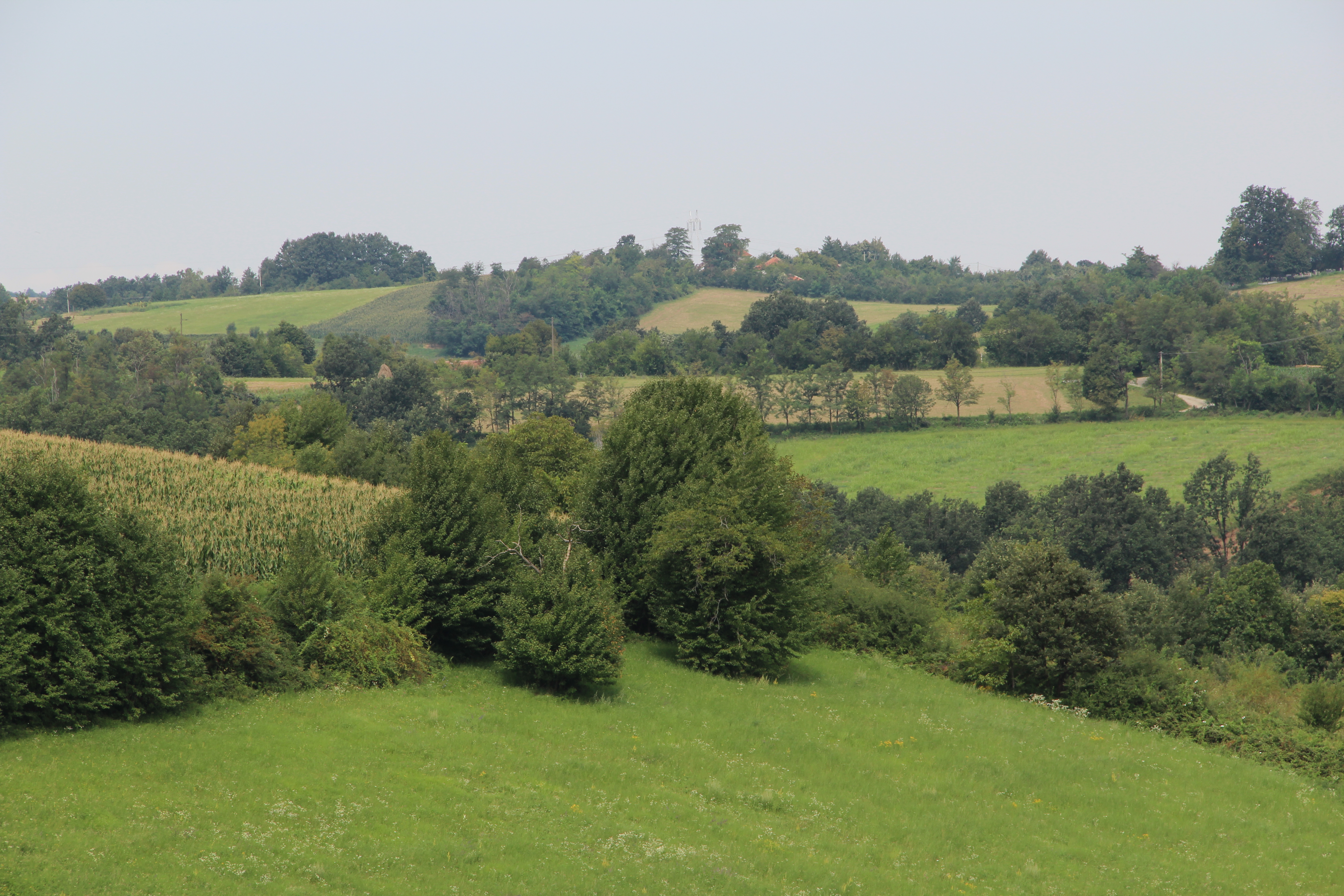
Kovačice - panorama
