= Polish name =

Polish names have two main elements: the given name, and the surname. The usage of personal names in Poland is generally governed by civil law, church law, personal taste and family custom.

Polish names are inflected for gender. Most female names end in the vowel -a, and most male names end in a consonant or a vowel other than a. There are, however, a few male names that end in a, which are often old and uncommon, such as Barnaba, Bonawentura, Jarema, Kosma, Kuba (formerly only a diminutive of Jakub, but nowadays also a given name on its own) and Saba. Maria is a female name that can also be used as a middle name for males.

Since the High Middle Ages, Polish-sounding surnames ending with the masculine -ski suffix, including -cki and -dzki, and the corresponding feminine suffix -ska/-cka/-dzka were associated with the nobility (Polish szlachta), which alone, in the early years, had such suffix distinctions. They are widely popular today.

== Given names ==
A child in Poland is usually given one or two names; Polish registry offices do not register more than two. Among Catholics, who form the vast majority of the population, it is customary to adopt the name of a saint as an informal, third given name at confirmation, however, this does not have any legal effect. (This is reminiscent of the pre-Christian rite of the "first haircut" (Polish: postrzyżyny), which also involved giving the child a new name.)

In the past, there was no restrictions on the number of the given names. In formal situations, multiple given names were presented in the following style: "Zygmunt, Józef, Erazm 3-ga imion Kaczkowski, urodził sie dnia 2 maja 1825 roku..." (Zygmunt, Józef, Erazm of three names Kaczkowski, was born on the day of the 2nd of May, in the year of 1825...) In the case of two first names the qualifier "of two names" (dwojga imion) was used; four names: "of 4 names" (4-ga imion), etc.

Parents normally choose from a long list of traditional names, which includes:

- Christian names, i.e., Biblical names and saint's names;
- Slavic names of pre-Christian origin.

The names of Slavic saints, such as Wojciech (St Adalbert), Stanisław (St Stanislaus), or Kazimierz (St Casimir), belong to both of these groups. Slavic names used by historical Polish monarchs, e.g. Bolesław, Lech, Mieszko, Władysław, are common as well. Additionally, a few names of Lithuanian origin, such as Olgierd (Algirdas), Witold (Vytautas) or Danuta, are quite popular in Poland.

Traditionally, the names are given at a child's baptism. Non-Christian, but traditional, Slavic names are usually accepted, but the priest may encourage parents to pick at least one Christian name. In the past, two Christian names were given to a child so that they had two patron saints instead of just one. At confirmation, people usually adopt yet another (second or third) Christian name, however, it is never used outside church documents.

In Eastern Poland, as in many other Catholic countries, people celebrate name days (Polish: imieniny) on the day of their patron saint. On the other hand, in Western Poland, birthdays are more popular. Today, in Eastern Poland, birthdays remain relatively intimate celebrations, as often only relatives and close friends know a person's date of birth. Name days, on the other hand, are often celebrated together with co-workers and other less-intimate friends. Information about whose name is associated with a given day can be found in most Polish calendars and on the Internet.

The choice of a given name is largely influenced by fashion. Many parents name their child after a national hero or heroine, or a character from a book, film, or TV show. In spite of this, a great number of popular names have been in use since the Middle Ages.

Diminutives are popular in everyday usage and are by no means reserved for children. The Polish language allows for a great deal of creativity in this field. Most diminutives are formed by adding a suffix. For male names it may be -ek or the more affectionate -uś; for female names it may be -ka, or -nia / -dzia / -sia / cia respectively. For example, Maria (a name which was once reserved to refer to the Virgin Mary; now the archaic form "Maryja" is used for this), has diminutives Marysia, Maryśka, Marysieńka, Mania, Mańka, Maniusia, etc.

Alternatively, augmentative forms (Polish: zgrubienie) may be colloquially used, often with scornful or disdainful intention. For example, Maria may be called Marycha or Marychna.

As in many other cultures, a person may informally use a nickname (pseudonim, ksywa) or instead of a given name.

In 2009, the most popular female names in Poland were Anna, Maria and Katarzyna (Katherine). The most popular male names were Piotr (Peter), Krzysztof (Christopher) and Andrzej (Andrew).

== Surnames ==
Surnames, like those in most of Europe, are hereditary and generally patrilineal, being passed from the father to his children.

A Polish marriage certificate lists three fields, the surnames for the husband, wife, and children. The partners may choose to retain their surnames, or both adopt the surname of either partner, or a combination of both; the children must receive either the joint surname or the surname of one of the partners. However, a married woman usually adopts her husband's name, and the children usually bear the surname of the father. The wife may keep her maiden name (nazwisko panieńskie) or add her husband's surname to hers, thus creating a double-barrelled name (nazwisko złożone). However, if she already has a double-barrelled name, she must leave one of the parts out—it is illegal to use a triple- or more-barrelled name. An exception is when one of the surnames is composed of a surname proper plus agnomen (przydomek), e.g., Maria Gąsienica Daniel-Szatkowska, where "Gąsienica Daniel" is her husband's surname. It is also possible, though rare, for the husband to adopt his wife's surname or to add his wife's surname to his family name (an example is businessman Zygmunt Solorz-Żak, who did both, taking his wife's name on his first marriage, and later appending his second wife's name to it). Polish triple-barreled surnames are known to exist; an example is the one borne by Ludwik Kos-Rabcewicz-Zubkowski, a university professor and writer, living in Canada.

The most widespread Polish surnames are Nowak, Kowalski, Wiśniewski and Wójcik.

=== Suffix -ski/-ska ===
-ski (also -sky in other regions) is an adjective-forming suffix, from the Proto-Slavic "ьskъ", which defined affiliation to something. It was also used with names of territories and settlements to denote possession or place of origin. The suffix, -ski (feminine: -ska), has been restricted to the nobility in eastern Europe and some parts of central Europe since the High Middle Ages. It was the equivalent to nobiliary particles appearing in the names of nobility, such as in the Germanic von or zu. Almost all surnames borne by the nobility with the -ski (or -sky) suffix are preceded by a place name (toponymic) or other territorial designation derived from their main court, holdings, castle, manor or estate. For example, the Polish nobleman Jan of Tarnów whose name in Polish is "Jan z Tarnowa" was equally known by the name "Jan Tarnowski"; this highlighted his nobility unlike the preposition of "z" alone which could be construed as a regular prepositional particle.

In the 19th century, a wave of seemingly noble sounding surnames began to appear among the common population, where a significant number of the bourgeoisie class, and even the peasantry, began to adopt or bear the noble -ski suffix. The -ski suffix was thus attached to surnames derived from a person's occupation, characteristics, or toponymic surnames (from a person's place of residence, birth or family origin). This caused a blur between the -ski bearing territorial toponymic surnames once a characteristic only borne by the nobility. As such, and contrary to a popular modern-day misconception, the fact of a person simply bearing the -ski suffix in their family surname or merely sharing the same toponymic surname as members of Poland's nobility, does not in itself denote that person too is a member of the nobility, of noble origin, or indeed connected to that particular family.

When referring to two or more members of the same family and surname, the suffix -ski (or -cki, -dzki) is replaced with the plural -skich, -scy, -ccy, or -dzcy (plural masculine or both masculine and feminine) as well as -skie, -ckie or -dzkie (plural feminine).

The -ski ending and similar adjectival endings (-cki, -dzki, -ny, -ty) are the only ones in Polish that have feminine forms, where women have the feminine version ending in -ska (-cka, -dzka, -na, -ta) instead. Historically, female versions of surnames were more complex, often formed by adding the suffix -owa for married women and -ówna or -wianka for unmarried women. In most cases, this practice is now considered archaic or rustic.

Other common surname suffixes are -czyk, -czek, -czak, -czuk, and -wicz.

=== History, heraldry, and clan names ===
Family names first appeared in Poland around the 13th century and were only used by the upper social classes of society. Over time the Polish nobility became grouped into heraldic clans (Polish ród herbowy) whose names survived in their shared coats of arms. Members of one clan could split into separate families with different surnames, usually derived from the name of their holdings or estates. Sometimes the family name and the clan name (associated with the arms) would be used together and form a double-barrelled name. The opposite process happened as well: different families may have joined a heraldic clans by the means of heraldic adoption.

To explain the formation of a particular Polish nobleman's name, e.g. Jakub Dąbrowski, Radwan coat of arms, the process might be the following. In Polish dąb means "oak", dąbrowa means "oak forest" and dąbrówka means "oak grove". Then, by analogy with German surnames associated with noble provenance using von, the equivalent Polish preposition is z, which means "from", followed by the name of the patrimony or estate. In Polish the expressions, z Dąbrówki and Dąbrowski mean the same thing: hailing "from Dąbrówka". More precisely, z Dąbrówki actually means owner of the estate, Dąbrówka, but not necessarily originating from there. Thus Jakub z Dąbrówki herbu Radwan translates as "Jacob from Dąbrówka, with the Radwan coat of arms". But with the later addition of his cognomen or nickname, Żądło, he would become known as, Jakub z Dąbrówki, Żądło, herbu Radwan - or he could be called just plain, Jakub Żądło.

The most striking concept of the Polish heraldic system is that a coat of arms may originate from a single family, but come to be carried by several non-related families of the Polish szlachta (nobility). Unrelated families who have joined the nobility by heraldic adoption can share the same coat of arms, even though that coat of arms bears the surname of the family who created it. Thus the total number of coats of arms in this system was relatively low — about 200 in the late Middle Ages. One side-effect of this unique arrangement was that it became customary to refer to noblemen by both their family name and their coat of arms/clan name. For example: Jan Zamoyski herbu Jelita means Jan Zamoyski of the clan Jelita.

From the 15th to the 17th century, the formula seems to copy the ancient Roman naming convention with the classic tria nomina used by the Patricians: praenomen (or given name), nomen gentile (or gens/Clan name) and cognomen (surname), following the Renaissance fashion. Thus, Jan Jelita Zamoyski, forming a double-barrelled name (nazwisko złożone). Later, the double-barrelled name would be joined with a hyphen: Jan Jelita-Zamoyski.

Example: Jakub: Radwan Żądło-Dąbrowski (sometimes Jakub: Radwan Dąbrowski-Żądło)
Part		Comment
Praenomen	Jakub	
Nomen	Radwan	nomen gentile—name of the gens/ród or knights' clan
Cognomen	Dąbrowski	name of the family branch/sept within the Radwan gens Other examples: Braniecki, Czcikowski, Dostojewski, Górski, Nicki, Zebrzydowski, etc.
Agnomen	Żądło	nickname, Polish przydomek (prior to the 17th century, was a cognomen)

Gradually the use of family names spread to other social groups: the townsfolk (burghers) by the end of the 17th century, then the peasantry, and finally the Jews. The process ended only in the mid-19th century.

After the First and Second World Wars some resistance fighters added their wartime noms de guerre to their original family names. This was yet another reason for creating double-barrelled names. Examples include Edward Rydz-Śmigły, Jan Nowak-Jeziorański, and Tadeusz Bór-Komorowski. Some artists, such as Tadeusz Boy-Żeleński, also added their noms de plume to their surnames.

=== Classification ===
Based on grammatical features, Polish surnames may be divided into:

- nominal, derived from and declined as a noun
- adjectival, derived from and declined as an adjective.

Adjectival names very often end in the suffixes, -ski, -cki and -dzki (feminine -ska, -cka and -dzka), and are considered to be either typically Polish or typical for the Polish nobility. In the case of '-ski', it holds true if the surname contains the name of a city, town, village or other geographical location.

Based on origin, Polish family names may be generally divided into three groups: cognominal, toponymic and patronymic.

==== Cognominal ====
A Polish cognominal surname (nazwisko przezwiskowe) derives from a person's nickname, usually based on his profession, occupation, physical description, character trait, etc. The occupational surnames often would come from the Medieval Polish serf-villages, where a whole village serving the prince, township or lord, or a few streets in a town block would be inhabited by the same kind of specialized workers, often a guild of professionals. These areas would often be separate from the rest of the town due to the danger of fire (bell-makers and smiths), area ownership by the guild, or due to unpleasant pollution (tanners, wool-workers). Such serf areas would bear the plural form of the profession name, such as Piekary (bakers), Garbary (tanners), Winiary (winemakers). Furthermore, the suffix -czyk, -yk, -ek was used to describe a profession as a diminutive, often, but not always, indicating a trainee - the learning assistant before achieving a full job title or seniority.

Examples of cognominal surnames:

- Kowal, Kowalski, Kowalczyk, Kowalczuk, Kowalewski, Kowalewicz – from kowal (blacksmith).
- Młynarz, Młynarski, Młynarczyk – from młynarz (miller).
- Nowak, Nowakowski, Nowicki – from nowy (the new one). (Nowak is the most popular Polish surname.)
- Lis, Lisiewicz, Lisowski – from lis (fox).
- Kołodziej, Kołodziejski, Kołodziejczak, Kołodziejczyk – from kołodziej (wheelwright).
- Kuchar, Kucharski, Kucharczyk – from kucharz (cook)
- Piekarski, Piekara, Piekarczyk – from piekarz (baker)
- Bednarski, Bednarek – from bednarz (barrel maker), or Garcarek – from garncarz (potter)
- Krawczyk – from krawiec (tailor), Szewczyk – from szewc (shoemaker), Tokarczyk – from tokarz (wood-turner)

===== From deverbal nouns =====
A class of cognomial surnames is derived from deverbal nouns.

- Deverbal nouns that denote a performer or a result of an action may serve as nicknames directly. For example, wikt:przybyć, 'to arrive', produces "Przybysz", literally "the one who arrived". Some occupational surnames may be of this type: Łatacz is the one who łata, i.e., makes patches (“a patcher”), Krawiec is the one who kraja, i.e., 'cuts' (“a tailor”), etc.
- A peculiar derivation of Polish surnames is from past tense participles. These names usually have the formally feminine (-ła) or neuter (-ło) ending of the (ancient, now obsolete) gender-neutral Polish active past participle, meaning "the one who had ...[come, applied, accomplished, settled, searched, found, etc.]". For example, the past particle przybyły (<the one> who had come") produces the noun "Przybyła". Other examples include Dolata, Domagała, Napierała, Dopierała, Szukała or Podsiadło, Wcisło, Wlazło, and Przybyło. A smaller number of surnames use the masculine ending, for example, Musiał or Niechciał.

==== Toponymic ====
Toponymic surnames (nazwisko odmiejscowe) usually derive from the name of a village or town, or the name of a topographic feature. These names are almost always of the adjectival form. Originally they referred to the village owner (lord). In the 19th century, however, surnames were often taken from the name of a person's town.

Examples of toponymic surnames:

- Brodowski – of Brodowo
- Tarnowski – of Tarnów
- Wrzesiński – of Września
- Krakowski – of Kraków
- Mazur, Mazurski – of Masuria

==== Patronymic ====
A patronymic surname (nazwisko odimienne) derives from the given name of a person, and usually ends in a suffix suggesting a family relation.

Examples of patronymic surnames:

- Adamczyk – derived from Adam
- Łukaszewski – derived from Łukasz (Luke).

==== Other ====
- A class of surnames uses the Latin disjunct vel ("or"). This arises when an ancestor was known by a given family name and under an alias. A case in point was when a soldier took part in an uprising and then pursued by the authorities, assumed another name. Subsequently, rather than lose one of his identities, he merged them using the disjunct, vel to indicate he was known under one or other name. For example, Przemysław Żurawski vel Grajewski. The family then kept the form.

==== Feminine forms ====
Adjectival surnames, like all Polish adjectives, have masculine and feminine forms. If a masculine surname ends in -i or -y; its feminine equivalent ends in -a.

The feminine form is not just a common usage form, it is also the form of the surname that appears in all official records, such as birth, death and marriage certificates, identity cards, and passports. A female first name coupled with a male surname or vice versa sounds incongruous and wrong to the Polish ear.

Surnames ending with consonants usually have no additional feminine form. In the past, when the masculine form ended in a consonant, the feminine surname could have been derived by adding the suffix -owa (possessive form) for married women and the suffix -ówna (patronymic form) for maiden surname. For example, Cezaria Baudouin de Courtenay, after her marriage to Janusz Jędrzejewicz, was named Cezaria Baudouin de Courtenay Ehrenkreutz Jędrzejewiczowa. The unmarried daughter of Jędrzejewicz would have the official surname Jędrzejewiczówna. In modern times, Jędrzejewicz may be both a masculine and a feminine surname.

Another pair of archaic feminine forms are these derived from the masculine surname based on a nickname ending in vowel: "-ina" for married (Puchała –> Puchalina) and "-anka/-ianka" for unmarried (Przybyła –> Przybylanka).

Still another archaic feminine forms are for surnames ending in -g or syllables starting with '-g': in this case the unmarried feminine form would use the suffix -żanka: Fertig -> Fertiżanka, Szeliga -> Szeliżanka.

==== Neuter form ====
The neuter form ("rodzaj nijaki") may be used in reference to neuter nouns such as dziecko, "child." For example, when talking about a child of the neighbours one may say "To małe Kowalskie jest bardzo spokojnym dzieckiem" ("That Kowalski little one is a very quiet child"), or in plural: "Wasilewskie wyjechały do babci" ("The Wasilewskis children went away to see their grandma"). Unlike the feminine form, this form is never used in official documents; it is an informal form used mostly in spoken language.

===== Examples of feminine and neuter forms =====
Masculine (singular)	Feminine (singular)	Neuter (singular), e.g. a child of unspecified sex	Masculine only - plural or: Entire family (Mr. & Mrs.) - plural (with or without children)	Feminine only - plural or: Children (of unspecified sex) only - plural
Malinowski	Malinowska	Malinowskie	Malinowscy	Malinowskie
Zawadzki	Zawadzka	Zawadzkie	Zawadzcy	Zawadzkie
Podgórny	Podgórna	Podgórne	Podgórni	Podgórne
Biały	Biała	Białe	Biali	Białe

Nominal surnames may or may not change with gender. Like other Slavic languages, Polish has special feminine suffixes which were added to a woman's surname. A woman who was never married used her father's surname with the suffix -ówna or -'anka. A married woman or a widow used her husband's surname with the suffix -owa or -'ina / -'yna (the apostrophe means that the last consonant in the base form of the surname is softened). Although these suffixes are still used by some people, mostly the elderly and in rural areas, they are now becoming outdated and there is a tendency to use the same form of a nominal surname for both a man and a woman. Furthermore, the forms "-anka" and "-ina/-yna" are going out of fashion and being replaced by "-ówna" and "-owa" respectively.

Father / husband	Unmarried woman	Married woman or widow
ending in a consonant (except g)	-ówna	-owa
ending in a vowel or in -g	-'anka	-'ina or -'yna

Examples of old feminine forms:

Father / husband	Unmarried woman	Married woman or widow
Nowak	Nowakówna	Nowakowa
Madej	Madejówna	Madejowa
Konopka	Konopczanka, new: Konopkówna	Konopczyna, new: Konopkowa
Zaręba	Zarębianka, new: Zarębówna	Zarębina, new: Zarębowa

=== Plural forms ===
Plural forms of surnames follow the pattern of the masculine and feminine forms, respectively, if such exist. For a married couple or a family where there is a mix of males and females, the masculine plural is used. Plural forms of names rarely follow the patterns of regular declension, even if the name is identical with a common name.

Surname masculine	Plural masculine or both masculine and feminine	Surname feminine	Plural feminine	Plural of the common name (for comparison)
Kowalski	Kowalscy	Kowalska	Kowalskie	---
Wilk ('wolf')	Wilkowie	(Wilkówna, Wilkowa)	(Wilkówne, Wilkowe)	wilki, wilcy
Zięba ('finch')	Ziębowie	(Ziębianka, Ziębina, new: Ziębówna, Ziębowa)	(Ziębianki, Ziębiny, new: Ziębówny, Ziębowe)	zięby

=== Declension of adjectival surnames ===
The table below shows the full declension of adjectival surnames ending in -ki (-ski, -cki, -dzki), using the surname "Kowalski" as an example.

Number:	Singular			Plural			Mixed (masculine and feminine)
Case	Masculine "męskie"	Feminine "żeńskie"	Neuter "nijakie"	Masculine	Feminine	Neuter	Mixed (masculine and feminine)
Nominative ("Mianownik")	Kowalski	Kowalska	Kowalskie	Kowalscy	Kowalskie		Kowalscy
Genitive ("Dopełniacz")	Kowalskiego	Kowalskiej	Kowalskiego	Kowalskich			Kowalskich
Dative ("Celownik")	Kowalskiemu	Kowalskiej	Kowalskiemu	Kowalskim			Kowalskim
Accusative ("Biernik")	Kowalskiego	Kowalską	Kowalskie	Kowalskich	Kowalskie		Kowalskich
Instrumental ("Narzędnik")	Kowalskim	Kowalską	Kowalskim	Kowalskimi			Kowalskimi
Locative ("Miejscownik")	Kowalskim	Kowalskiej	Kowalskim	Kowalskich			Kowalskich
Vocative ("Wołacz")	Kowalski	Kowalska	Kowalskie	Kowalscy	Kowalskie		Kowalscy

=== Multiple surnames of married women ===
Although a remarried woman who takes the new husband's surname does not formally retain the surname(s) from the previous marriages, on biographical occasions all her surnames may be listed as follows: "Maria Piłsudska, de domo Koplewska, primo voto Juszkiewicz, secundo voto Piłsudska", where "de domo" literally meaning "of house" is basically the same as née, "primo voto" marks the surname by the first marriage, "secundo voto" marks the surname by the second marriage, etc.

== Formal and informal use ==
Poles pay great attention to the correct way of referring to, or addressing other people, depending on the level of social distance, familiarity and politeness. The differences between formal and informal language include:

- using surnames or given names
- using or not using honorific titles, such as Pan / Pani / Państwo;
- using the third person singular (formal) or the second person singular (informal) forms.

=== Formal language ===
==== Pan / Pani / Państwo ====
Pan and Pani are the basic honorific styles used in Polish to refer to a man or woman, respectively. In the past, these styles were reserved for hereditary nobles, and played more or less the same role as "Lord" or "Sir" and "Lady" or "Madame" in English. Since the 19th century, they have come to be used in all strata of society and may be considered equivalent to the English "Mr." and "Ms." or the Japanese "san" suffix, while nobles would be addressed "Jego/Jej Miłość Pan/Pani" (His/Her Grace Lord/Lady). There used to be a separate style, Panna ("Miss"), applied to unmarried women, but this is now outdated and mostly replaced by Pani.

"Państwo" is widely used when referring to a married couple (instead of using Pan and Pani) or even a whole family.

Examples:

- Pan Kowalski + Pani Kowalska = Państwo Kowalscy
- Pan Nowak + Pani Nowak = Państwo Nowakowie

==== Titles ====
When addressing people, scientific and other titles are always used together with "Pan" and "Pani" and the name itself is dropped. However, when a person is spoken of but not addressed directly, then both the title and the name are used and the words "Pan"/"Pani" are often omitted.

Examples:

- "Panie profesorze" ("Professor"), "Pan profesor powiedział" ("Professor (X) said" or "you have said, professor")
- "Pani doktor" ("Doctor"), "Pani doktor powiedziała" ("Doctor (X) said" or "you have said, doctor")

but:

- "Pan profesor Jan Nowak" or "profesor Jan Nowak" or "profesor Nowak",
- "Pani doktor Maria Kowalska" or "doktor Maria Kowalska" or "doktor Kowalska"

==== Given name / surname order ====
The given name(s) normally comes before the surname. However, in a list of people sorted alphabetically by surname, the surname usually comes first. Hence some people may also use this order in spoken language (e.g. introducing themselves as Kowalski Jan instead of Jan Kowalski), but this is generally considered incorrect or a throwback to the Communist era when this order was sometimes heard in official situations. In many formal situations, the given name is omitted altogether.

Examples:

- Pan Włodzimierz Malinowski
- Pani Jadwiga Kwiatkowska

On the other hand, it is not common to refer to public figures, while not addressing them, with "Pan" or "Pani". This is true for politicians, artists, and athletes.

- "Jan Kowalski był dziś w Gdańsku." ("Jan Kowalski was in Gdansk today") and not "Pan Jan Kowalski był dziś w Gdańsku."
- "Jan Kowalski uważa, że" or "Minister Kowalski uważa, że" ("Mr Kowalski maintains that") is better than "Pan Kowalski uważa, że".
- "Film reżyserował Jan Kowalski." ("The film was directed by Jan Kowalski.") and not: "Film reżyserował pan Jan Kowalski."
- "Złoty medal zdobyła Anna Kowalska." ("The gold medal was won by Anna Kowalska.") and never: "Złoty medal zdobyła pani Anna Kowalska."

In such circumstances, preceding a name with "Pan" or "Pani" would usually be seen as being ironical.

=== Semi-formal levels of address ===
In situations of frequent contact, like at work, people who do not change their status from formal to familiar levels may remain for years at a semi-formal level, using the formal "Pan"/"Pani" form followed by the given name. That way of calling people is used not only to address them but also to refer to them to a third person with whom one remains at the same level of semi-formal contact.

If two people do not have the same status, such as an employer and employee, a subordinate person is addressed by his or her given name by their superior, but the subordinate never uses the given name of the superior but instead uses the title.

- the superior to a subordinate: "Panie Włodzimierzu!", "Pani Jadwigo!";
- a subordinate to the superior: "Panie Dyrektorze!" (literally: "Mr Principal!"), "Pani Kierownik!" (literally: "Mrs Manager!").

This style is to a certain degree similar to the Vietnamese, Japanese or Icelandic usage.

If a superior wants to behave more politely or show a friendly attitude towards the subordinate, a diminutive form of the given name may be used: "Panie Włodku!", "Pani Jadziu!". That, however, is usually not practised when the subordinate is much older than the superior, as it may be felt by the subordinate as being overly patronised by the superior.

It is rude to call a person by a surname in the presence of unknown people. In a random crowd, for example, a person calling another person should use a form of "Proszę Pana/Pani" ("I'm asking you, Sir/Madam") or use the semi-formal form with first name, like "Panie Włodzimierzu" ("Mr. Włodzimierz"). That comes from a general rule that one has the right to be anonymous in a crowd of unknown people, and the rule is observed in most Western countries. To disclose one's given name does not fall under that rule, as many people are "Włodzimierz", for instance.

=== Semi-informal and informal forms of address ===
Informal forms of address are normally used only by relatives, close friends and co-workers. In such situations diminutives are generally preferred to the standard forms of given names. At an intermediate level of familiarity (for example, among co-workers) a diminutive given name may be preceded by formal the Pan or Pani (semi-informal form of address):

- Pan Włodek (but also standard semi-formal form "Pan Włodzimierz") - in direct address "Panie Włodku" (standard: "Panie Włodzimierzu")
- Pani Jadzia (but also "Pani Jadwiga") - in direct address "Pani Jadziu" (standard: "Pani Jadwigo")

Using the honorific style with a surname only, if used to refer to a given person directly, is generally perceived as rude. In such case, it is more polite to use just the form "Pan", without given or family name.

It is very rude to address someone whom one does not know well without using "Pan" or "Pani", and with the second person singular instead of the polite third person singular pronouns and verb forms. Traditionally, the act of moving from this form to a friendly "you" must be acknowledged by both parties and it is usually a mark of a close friendly relationship between the two people. The change can only be proposed by the older or more respected person; a similar suggestion initiated by the younger or less respected person will usually be perceived as presumptuous and arrogant.

== Change of name ==
A Polish citizen may apply to the registry office (Urząd Stanu Cywilnego) with a request for a change of name or surname alongside the payment of a small administrative fee. If the change of surname is not linked to marriage, the family surname is also changed in the successful applicant's documents. A note is added to the applicant's birth certificate in the system, informing of the subsequent change of name.

The request is not always successful. Certain types of request are certain to be refused: for example, the surname of a famous historical figure (where the applicant cannot demonstrate a close family connection to the surname), or where there is concern that the applicant is applying with the aim of evading criminal or civil responsibility. Every application must give a motivation for the change of name; for example, the existing name being offensive or funny, the desire to revert to a previous name, a close attachment to family members (e.g. parent, step-parent) bearing a different surname, or being commonly known in unofficial contexts by a different name.

== In diasporas ==
The Polish names, of course, are unpronounceable

— Why Polish RAF pilots received nicknames during World War II

When Polish individuals emigrate to countries with different languages and cultures, the often-difficult spelling and pronunciation of Polish names commonly cause them to be misspelled, changed, shortened, or calqued. For example, in English, w is often changed to v and sz to sh. Similar changes occur in French. Changes in Spanish can be even more extreme; a Spiczyński may become simply Spika, for example, where a more rigorous transcription would produce de Spichiñsqui.

Another typical change is the loss of the gender distinction in adjectival surnames, especially visible for those ending in -ski (fem.: -ska), -cki (fem.: -cka) and -dzki (fem.: -dzka). Western languages do not distinguish between male and female surnames, even if the language has gender-specific adjectives (like German, French or Spanish). As the surname is, in most cases, inherited from the father (or accepted from the husband), the Western registries of birth and marriage ascribe the masculine form (the one ending in -i) to the female members of the family. Slavic countries, in contrast, would use the feminine form of the surname (the one ending in -a). The form Anna Kowalski would never be met within Poland, whereas it is commonly found in the US, Germany and Argentina.

However, as an exception, feminine endings like -ska apply even to some women from non-Slavic countries, not just outside Poland or English-speaking ones, who have Polish parentage or are half-Polish, namely Britain's Ella Balinska, whose father has the masculine Balinski(-Jundzill), and Australians Mia Wasikowska and her sister, Jess, who have the same ending as their mother's.

Another modification is changing the final vowel -i of the endings -ski, -cki and -dzki into -y. Those endings are common in Czech, Slovak and Ukrainian, as well as in English, but they never occur in Polish.

When transliterated into languages that use the Cyrillic alphabet, such as Russian or Ukrainian, alterations are usually much less drastic, as the languages involved are Slavic and less difficult for the natives, and feminine forms are preserved although the -ski/-ska ending is altered slightly to the corresponding ending in Russian (-ский/-ская) or Ukrainian (-ський/-ська). Similar alterations occur to Polish names in Belarus, Lithuania and Latvia.

== List of most common Polish surnames ==
List of surnames of living people appearing in the PESEL register, as of January 20, 2026
Male			Female		
Rank	Name	Number	Rank	Name	Number
1	Nowak	98 387	1	Nowak	99 738
2	Kowalski	66 589	2	Kowalska	67 308
3	Wiśniewski	53 079	3	Wiśniewska	54 177
4	Wójcik	47 734	4	Wójcik	48 568
5	Kowalczyk	46 994	5	Kowalczyk	48 264
6	Kamiński	45 818	6	Kamińska	46 723
7	Lewandowski	44 466	7	Lewandowska	46 268
8	Zieliński	43 931	8	Zielińska	44 578
9	Woźniak	42 550	9	Szymańska	43 451
10	Szymański	42 412	10	Dąbrowska	43 316
11	Dąbrowski	41 552	11	Woźniak	43 066
12	Kozłowski	36 244	12	Kozłowska	36 866
13	Mazur	34 576	13	Mazur	35 206
14	Jankowski	33 109	14	Jankowska	33 836
15	Kwiatkowski	31 900	15	Kwiatkowska	32 953
16	Wojciechowski	31 551	16	Wojciechowska	32 544
17	Krawczyk	30 308	17	Krawczyk	31 329
18	Kaczmarek	29 820	18	Kaczmarek	30 240
19	Piotrowski	29 304	19	Piotrowska	30 007
20	Grabowski	27 980	20	Grabowska	28 706
21	Zając	26 873	21	Pawłowska	27 328
22	Pawłowski	26 710	22	Król	26 974
23	Król	26 554	23	Michalska	26 919
24	Michalski	26 027	24	Zając	26 509
25	Wróbel	24 717	25	Wieczorek	24 835
26	Wieczorek	24 202	26	Jabłońska	24 731
27	Jabłoński	24 017	27	Wróbel	24 385
28	Majewski	23 644	28	Nowakowska	24 313
29	Nowakowski	23 620	29	Majewska	24 209
30	Olszewski	23 249	30	Olszewska	23 543
31	Dudek	22 654	31	Adamczyk	23 227
32	Jaworski	22 584	32	Jaworska	23 223
33	Malinowski	22 567	33	Malinowska	23 049
34	Stępień	22 508	34	Stępień	22 773
35	Adamczyk	22 435	35	Dudek	22 591
36	Górski	21 803	36	Górska	22 448
37	Pawlak	21 721	37	Nowicka	22 286
38	Sikora	21 643	38	Witkowska	21 903
39	Nowicki	21 600	39	Sikora	21 754
40	Witkowski	21 225	40	Pawlak	21 751
41	Rutkowski	21 069	41	Rutkowska	21 414
42	Baran	20 918	42	Walczak	21 405
43	Walczak	20 882	43	Michalak	20 837
44	Michalak	20 290	44	Ostrowska	20 705
45	Ostrowski	20 177	45	Szewczyk	20 638
46	Szewczyk	20 041	46	Baran	20 208
47	Tomaszewski	19 259	47	Tomaszewska	19 736
48	Zalewski	19 000	48	Zalewska	19 328
49	Wróblewski	18 692	49	Wróblewska	19 196
50	Pietrzak	18 427	50	Pietrzak	19 172
51	Jasiński	18 386	51	Jasińska	18 912
52	Duda	18 272	52	Marciniak	18 782
53	Marciniak	18 116	53	Jakubowska	18 618
54	Sadowski	18 029	54	Sadowska	18 555
55	Bąk	17 954	55	Zawadzka	18 368
56	Zawadzki	17 942	56	Duda	18 320
57	Jakubowski	17 817	57	Włodarczyk	17 559
58	Wilk	17 374	58	Chmielewska	17 544
59	Chmielewski	17 130	59	Borkowska	17 471
60	Borkowski	16 854	60	Bąk	17 322
61	Włodarczyk	16 740	61	Wilk	17 218
62	Sokołowski	16 509	62	Sokołowska	17 075
63	Szczepański	16 419	63	Szczepańska	16 778
64	Sawicki	16 367	64	Sawicka	16 612
65	Lis	16 310	65	Lis	16 466
66	Kucharski	15 727	66	Kucharska	16 084
67	Kalinowski	15 571	67	Kalinowska	15 949
68	Wysocki	15 489	68	Mazurek	15 844
69	Mazurek	15 397	69	Maciejewska	15 831
70	Kubiak	15 324	70	Kubiak	15 773
71	Maciejewski	15 318	71	Wysocka	15 737
72	Kołodziej	14 881	72	Kołodziej	15 225
73	Kaźmierczak	14 527	73	Czarnecka	15 055
74	Czarnecki	14 425	74	Kaźmierczak	14 808
75	Krupa	13 866	75	Urbańska	14 078
76	Sobczak	13 851	76	Krupa	14 051
77	Konieczny	13 849	77	Głowacka	13 913
78	Głowacki	13 651	78	Sobczak	13 897
79	Kozak	13 597	79	Sikorska	13 869
80	Mróz	13 589	80	Krajewska	13 848
81	Urbański	13 510	81	Zakrzewska	13 755
82	Zakrzewski	13 425	82	Kozak	13 582
83	Krajewski	13 390	83	Ziółkowska	13 517
84	Wasilewski	13 358	84	Laskowska	13 516
85	Laskowski	13 261	85	Wasilewska	13 510
86	Sikorski	13 199	86	Gajewska	13 354
87	Ziółkowski	13 070	87	Mróz	13 339
88	Gajewski	12 999	88	Szulc	13 280
89	Makowski	12 956	89	Makowska	13 265
90	Szulc	12 953	90	Kaczmarczyk	13 098
91	Kaczmarczyk	12 758	91	Brzezińska	13 020
92	Baranowski	12 693	92	Przybylska	13 012
93	Brzeziński	12 673	93	Baranowska	12 967
94	Przybylski	12 529	94	Szymczak	12 855
95	Janik	12 477	95	Adamska	12 764
96	Kania	12 463	96	Błaszczyk	12 701
97	Szymczak	12 428	97	Borowska	12 643
98	Adamski	12 405	98	Szczepaniak	12 529
99	Borowski	12 403	99	Kania	12 508
100	Błaszczyk	12 322	100	Górecka	12 505

== See also ==
- Family name
- Family name affixes
- History of Polish
- Name of Poland
- Polish clans
- Polish heraldry
- Slavic names
- Slavic name suffixes
- T–V distinction
