= Przybyła =

Przybyła (Polish pronunciation: ['pʂɨˈbɨwa]) is a Polish-language surname based on the nickname derived from the verb przybyć (to arrive), "the one who had arrived". It may also be derived as a simplification of given names such as Przybysław, Przybygniew etc. Archaic feminine forms: Przybylina (by husband), Przybylanka (by father). The may still be used colloquially. See also Polish name#Other. Notable people with this surname include:

- Józef Przybyła (1945–2009), Polish ski-jumper
- Mateusz Przybyła (born 1991), Polish volleyball player
- Michał Przybyła (born 1994), Polish footballer

== See also ==
- Joel Przybilla
- Przybyło
- Przybysz
- Przybyłek
- Przybylski
- Przybyłowicz
