= Maxwell Hendler =

American painter (born 1938)

Maxwell Hendler (born 1938) is an American painter. In 1975, he became the first contemporary artist to have pictures in the collection of the Metropolitan Museum of Art in New York.

Born in St. Louis, Missouri, in 1938, Hendler moved to Los Angeles in 1955. He received a BA in 1960 and an MA in 1962 from the University of California, Los Angeles. He did post-graduate studies in painting at UCLA between 1962 and 1964. In 1967, Hendler became a full-time instructor of the arts at California State University at Northridge. In 1969, he became an associate professor at California State University at Long Beach in the School of Fine Arts.

Hendler's work from the 1960s to the mid-1970s was exemplified by a precise approach produced from direct observation of his subjects, not by working from photographs. His paintings were usually small, most were less than 12 inches square. In addition, Hendler created five paintings between 1965 and 1975.

By the 1980s, Hendler began producing work that featured painted words and textured grounds. Many of these works synthesize idioms of pop art, minimalism and conceptual art practices.

In 1990, Hendler produced the first of his poured and polished polyester resin paintings. These works feature monochromatic and highly polished surfaces in a range of sizes and proportions.

== Solo exhibitions ==
- 2010 Manny Silverman Gallery, Los Angeles, California
- 2008 Two Approaches to Monochrome, (two-person exhibition with James Hayward) Manny Silverman Gallery, Los Angeles, California
- 2005, 2002, 2000, 1998, 1995, Patricia Faure Gallery, Santa Monica, California
- 1993, 1989, 1987, 1985 Asher/Faure, Los Angeles, California
- 1986 Selected Paintings 1978–1986, Rio Hondo College, Whittier, California
- 1983 Municipal Art Gallery, Los Angeles, California
- 1981, 1978 Robert Miller Gallery, New York, New York
- 1981 King of Hearts II, Mendocino, California
- 1976 Maxwell Hendler: Sandpainting, 1969–1976, Los Angeles County Museum of Art, Los Angeles, California
- 1975 Maxwell Hendler, The Metropolitan Museum of Art, New York, New York
- 1969 Eugenia Butler Gallery, Los Angeles, California
- 1965 Ceeje Gallery, Los Angeles, California
- 1962 Ceeje Gallery, Los Angeles, California (two-person exhibition with Arlene Goldberg)
- 1962 Dickson Art Center, University of California, Los Angeles, California

== Group exhibitions ==
- 2010 Groupings, Manny Silverman Gallery, Los Angeles, California
- 2009 Made in America, Manny Silverman Gallery, Los Angeles, California

2008

- Mostly Black & White, Manny Silverman Gallery, Los Angeles, California
- Color Blind: Black, White and Gray in Contemporary Art, Cardwell-Jimmerson Contemporary Art, Culver City, California
- Fall Selections, Manny Silverman Gallery, Los Angeles, California
- 2007 Monochrome Paintings: Some Versions from Ad Reinhardt to Present, Cardwell-Jimmerson Contemporary Art, Culver City, California
- 2005 Pink, Patricia Faure Gallery, Santa Monica Originals, Curated by Bruria Finkel, Arena 1, Santa Monica, California
- 2004 White on White, Paper, Patricia Faure Gallery
- 2003 Hyperrealismees - USA, 1965–1975, Strasbourg, France
- 2002 Art on Paper, Weatherspoon Art Museum, Greensboro, North Carolina, Fitz Gibbon Exhibition, The Pilot Hill Collection of Contemporary Art, Crocker Art Museum, Sacramento, California

2001

- Simply Complex: Monochrome Paintings from L.A., Curated by Reuben Baron and Joan Baron, Hunsaker/Schlesinger Fine Art, Santa Monica, California
- Group Exhibition, Patricia Faure Gallery
- Conceptual Color: In Albers’ Afterimage, Fine Arts Gallery, San Francisco State University, College of Creative Arts, San Francisco, California
- Cloud 9, Curated by David Pagel, Gensler & Assoc., Santa Monica, California
- Made, POST, Los Angeles, California

2000

- Simply Complex: Monochrome Painting from Louisiana, Dorsky Gallery, New York, New York; traveled to Storrs, Connecticut; Boston, Massachusetts; Santa Fe, New Mexico
- The Flower Show: An Invitational, Patricia Faure Gallery, Santa Monica, California
- LuminocitA’ Colori Dalla California: Hendler, Huerta, Kaufmann Studio La Citta, Verona, Italy

1999 Size Matters, Patricia Faure Gallery, Painting: Fore and Aft, ACME, Los Angeles, California 1998 Hendler/Kraal/Thurston, Hunsaker/Schlesinger Fine Art, Santa Monica, California, Double Trouble: The Patchett Collection, Museum of Contemporary Art, San Diego, La Jolla, California 1997 Some Lust, Patricia Faure Gallery, Painting Beyond the Idea, Curated by Bennett Roberts. Manny Silverman Gallery, 1996 Seven Strangers, Patricia Faure Gallery, Red Painting, Newspace, Los Angeles, California Fifteen Artists, Patricia Faure Gallery, 1995 Murder, Curated by John Yau, Thread Waxing Space, New York, New York and Bergamot Station Arts Center, Santa Monica, California, Very Visual Dialogue, Rancho Santiago College, Santa Ana, California 1994

- Recent Painting, Asher Faure,
- Visual Dialogue: Personal Journeys in Abstract Painting, Rancho Santiago College Art Gallery
- Blue, Stephen Wirtz Gallery, San Francisco, California
- Plane/Structures, traveling exhibition, Curated by David Pagel, Otis Gallery, Otis College of Art and Design, Los Angeles, California; Renaissance Society, University of Chicago,
- I to Eye 2, Cirrus, Los Angeles, California

1991 Art-Over-the Sofa, Curated by Jan Butterfield, Boritzer/Gray, Los Angeles, California, Not on Canvas, Asher/Faure, 1990 Group Show, Asher Faure Gallery, Hollywoodland, fiction/nonfiction, New York, New York, California A-Z and Return, Butler Institute of American Art, Youngstown, Ohio 1987 Reduced Scale, Rio Hondo College, Whittier, California, Industrial Icons: Painting, Photography and Sculpture, University Art Gallery, San Diego State University, San Diego, California. 1986

- A Southern California Collection, Cirrus Gallery, Los Angeles, California
- Invitational Drawing Show, Golden West College, Huntington Beach, California
- American Realism/20th Century Drawings & Watercolors, San Francisco Museum of Modern Art, San Francisco, California

1985

- Levels of Reality: the realist paintings of Michiel Daniel, Maxwell Hendler and Mark Wethli, Saddleback College, Mission Viejo, California
- California Art from the Frederick R. Weisman Foundation, Senate Office Building, Washington, DC
- To the Astonishing Horizon, Curated by Peter Frank, Design Center, Los Angeles, California
- New Work, Asher/Faure, Los Angeles, California
- Crime and Punishment, Triton Museum of Art, Santa Clara, California
- California: Idions of Surrealism, Fisher Art Gallery, University of Southern California, Los Angeles, California

1984

- New Work, Paintings 1984, Asher/Faure,
- A Focus on California, Ahmanson Gallery, Los Angeles County Museum of Art, Los Angeles, California
- Ceeje Revisited, Curated by Faith Flam, Municipal Art Gallery, Barnsdall Park, Los Angeles, California
- Frederick Weisman Foundation Collection of Contemporary Art, Palm Springs Desert Museum, Palm Springs, California

1983

- Hassam and Speicher Fund Purchase Exhibition, American Academy and Institute of Arts and Letters, New York, New York
- California: Idioms of Surrealism, traveling exhibition organized by The Fisher Gallery, University of Southern California, Los Angeles, California; The USC Atelier, Santa Monica, California; Art Gallery, California State College, Stanislaus, Turlock, California; Prate Manhattan Center Gallery, New York, New York; Pratt Institute Gallery, Brooklyn, New York.
- American Accents, traveling exhibition Curated by Henry Geldzahler, The Gallery Stratford, Stratford, Ontario; College Park, Toronto;Musee du Quebec, Quebec, Art Gallery of Nova Scotia, Halifax, Nova Scotia; Art Gallery of Windsor, Windsor, Ontario, The Edmonton Art Gallery, Edmonton, Alberta; Vancouver Art Gallery, Vancouver, British Columbia; Glenbow Museum, Calgary, Alberta; Musee d’Art Contemporain, Montreal, Quebec, Canada.
- West Coast Realism, Traveling exhibition, curated by Lynn Gamwell, Laguna Beach Museum of Art, Laguna Beach, California; Museum of Art, Fort Lauderdale, Florida; Center for Visual Arts, Illinois State University, Normal, Illinois; Fresno Art Center, Fresno, California; Louisiana Arts and Science Center, Baton Rouge, Louisiana; Museum of Art, Bowdoin College, Brunswick, Maine; Colorado Springs, Fine Arts Center, Colorado Springs, Colorado; Spiva Art Center, Joplin, Missouri; Beaumont Art Museum, Beaumont, Texas; Sierra Nevada Museum of Art, Reno, Nevada; Edison Community College, Fort Myers, Florida.
- Limited Palettes, Asher Faure, Los Angeles, California
- 1982 Drawings by Painters, The Oakland Museum, Oakland, California; Mandeville Art Gallery, University of California, San Diego, California; Long Beach Museum of Art, Long Beach, California

1980

- Three Realist Painters, L.A. Louver Gallery, Los Angeles, California
- Still Life Today, Curated by Janice Oresman, Goddard-Riverside Community Center, New York, New York
- Contemporary Naturalism, Nassau County Museum of Fine Art, Nassau, New York

1978

- Representations of America, Curated by Henry Geldzahler, The Hermitage, Leningrad, Russia; Pushkin Museum, Moscow, Russia
- A Sense of Scale, The Oakland Museum, Oakland, California
- Painting and Sculpture in California: The Modern Era, Co-curated by Walter Hopps & Henry Hopkins, The National Collection of Fine Arts, Washington, DC; and the San Francisco Museum of Modern Art, San Francisco, California

1976

- Los Angeles Eight: Painting and Sculpture, 1976, Curated by Maurice Tuchman, Los Angeles County Museum of Art, Los Angeles, California
- America As Art, The National Collection of Fine Arts, Washington, DC
- 1975 The Realist Image, Loyola Marymount University, Los Angeles, California
- 1973 Separate Realities, Municipal Art Gallery, Los Angeles, California

1971

- Eleven Los Angeles Artists, Der Neue Berliner Kunstverein, Berlin, West Germany; Palais de Beaux Arts, Brussels, Belgium; The Hayward Gallery, London, England, Curated by Maurice Tuchman & Jane Livingston,
- Faculty Exhibition, California State University, Long Beach, California

1970

- 22 Realists, The Whitney Museum of American Art, New York, New York
- Beyond the Actual: Contemporary California Realist Painters, Pioneer Museum of Art, Stockton, California
- American Painting 1970, Virginia Museum of Art, Richmond, California
- Directly Seen: California Realist Painters, Newport Harbor Art Museum, Balboa, California
- Realist Painters, Everson Museum of Art, Syracuse, New York; Albright Knox Museum of Art, Buffalo, New York

1969

- New Faculty Exhibition, California State College, Long Beach, California
- California Artist, University of Nevada, Reno, Nevada
- Third Annual Small Images Exhibition, California State College, Los Angeles, California
- 1968 Artists Who Teach, Los Angeles County Museum of Art Rental Gallery, Los Angeles, California, The Beach Show, San Fernando Valley State College
- 1967 Aspects of Realism, Los Angeles County Museum of Art, Rental Gallery, New Faculty Exhibition, San Fernando Valley State College

1966

- Faculty Collections Exhibition, San Fernando Valley State College, Northridge, California
- All City Art Festival, Municipal Art Gallery, Los Angeles, California
- Annual National Competition, Butler Institute of American Art, Youngstown, Ohio
- 1965 Annual Southern California Competition, Long Beach Museum of Art, Long Beach, California
- 1964 Fifth Annual Festival of the Arts, Whittier College, Whittier, California
- 1961 Lake Arrowhead Conference Center, University of California, Lake Arrowhead, California, Inaugural Exhibition, Art Rental Gallery, Pasadena Art Museum, Pasadena, California

== Articles and reviews ==
- 2008 Take Pleasure in Monochrome, David Pagel, Los Angeles Times, April 11
- 2005 Art Pick of the Week, Cindy Kolodziejski, LA Weekly, March 18–24
- 2004 The Many Colors of White, Explored, Christopher Knight, Los Angeles Times, March 19
- 2002 Hendler Paintings Mesmerized with Intense Hues, Christopher Knight, Los Angeles Times, June 14, So Simple, Yet So Difficult to Arrive At, Hunter Drohojowska-Philip, Los Angeles Times, May 19.
- 2001 Conceptual Color in Albers’ Afterimage at SFSU, Colin Berry, Artweek, November
- 2000 For Hendler, It’s a Bright, Bright World, David Pagel, Los Angeles Times, May 5

1998

- The Best of 1998, Dave Hickey, ArtForum, December
- The Best of 1998, Lisa Liebmann, ArtForum, December
- Maxwell Hendler at Patricia Faure, Jody Zellen, d’Art International, Fall
- Hendler Evokes Simple Yet Complex Joys, David Pagel, Los Angeles Times, June 5
- Style Over Substance in ‘Beyond the idea’, David Pagel, Los Angeles Times, October 12
- Exhibition blurs lines between art and kitsch, Robert Pincus, San Diego Union, July 5
- 1995 Maxwell Hendler, Master of the Colorful, David Pagel, Los Angeles Times, May 4, Plane/Structures Requires Altered Behavior, Graham Shearing, Pittsburgh Review, Feb 10
- 1994 Like Gazing Into a Deep Pool at Night, ‘Plane/Structures’ at Otis College of Art and Design, Jan Tumlir, Artweek, Oct 6

1993

- Images Play with Light, Sight at Asher/Faure,” David Pagel, Los Angeles Times, March 4
- Starting with McLaughlin, Hendler, Kraal, Thurston, Art Picks of the Week, Peter Frank, LA Weekly, May 1–7
- Maxwell Hendler, David A. Greene, Art Issues, May/June
- 1993 Maxwell Hendler at Asher/Faure, Michael Anderson, Art in America, October. Looking in on Diversity in Three Acts, William Wilson, Los Angeles Times, May 22.
- 1990 X is for MaXwell Hendler, John Fitz Gibbon, The Butler Institute of American Art, June - August
- 1989 The Galleries, Los Angeles Times, Marlene Donahue, July 21
- 1987 Art 9/87, Maxwell Hendler, California Magazine, September, Los Angeles, Maxwell Hendler, Colin Gardner, ArtForum, October, The Art Galleries, Los Angeles Times, Sept 4, Cathy Curtis

1985

- Words as Images (ABC NO GAGA), Joan Hugo, Artweek, August
- Art Reviews, Kristine McKenna, Los Angeles Times, August 9
- Maxwell Hendler at Asher/Faure, Merle Shipper, ArtNews, October
- Landscape: The Bus Stops Here, Suzanne Muchnic, Los Angeles Times, January 26
- Reviews,” Colin Gardner, Artforum, December
- 1975 Maxwell Hendler at the Metropolitan Museum, Barbara Thomsen, Art in America, Nov/Dec.
- 1971 11 L.A. Artists to Open in London, Los Angeles Times, Sunday, September 5
- 1965 Hendler’s Form One of Clarity, William Wilson, Los Angeles Times, December 3, Maxwell Hendler, Ceeje Gallery, E.K., ArtForum, November

== Museum collections ==
- Buck Collection, Laguna Beach, California
- Contemporary Museum, Honolulu, Hawaii
- Los Angeles County Museum of Art, Los Angeles, California
- Metropolitan Museum of Art, New York, New York
- Oakland Museum, Oakland, California
- Weisman Foundation, Beverly Hills, California

== Honors and awards ==
- 1974/75 National Endowment for the Arts, Fellowship in Painting
- 1972/73 John Simon Guggenheim Memorial Fellowship
- 1962/63 Max Beckmann Memorial Scholarship, Brooklyn Museum of Art School, New York, New York
- 1961/62 Teaching Assistantship, Art Department, University of California, Los Angeles

== Bibliography ==
- 22 Realists, Curated by James K. Monte, Whitney Museum of American Art, New York, 1970
- Beyond the Actual, Contemporary California Realist Painting, Curated by Donald Brewer, Pioneer Museum and Haggin Galleries, Stockton, California, 1970
- Directly Seen, Curated by Thomas Garver, Newport Harbor Art Museum, Balboa, California, 1970
- American Painting 1970, Curated by Peter Selz, Virginia Museum, Richmond, Virginia, 1970
- 11 Los Angeles Artists, Curated by Maurice Tuchman and Jane Livingston, Hayward Gallery, London, 1971
- Separate Realities : Development in California Representational Painting and Sculpture, an Exhibition Organized By the Los Angeles Municipal Art Gallery Los Angeles Municipal Art Gallery, 1973
- LA8: Painting and Sculpture 76, Curated by Maurice Tuchman, Los Angeles County Museum of Art, 1976
- Painting and Sculpture in California: The Modern Era, Curated by Henry T. Hopkins and Walter Hopps, San Francisco Museum of Modern Art, San Francisco, 1976
- a sense of scale, Curated by George Neubert, The Oakland Museum, Oakland, California, 1977
- Contemporary Naturalism, Works of the 1970s, Curated by Phyllis Stigliano and Janice Parente, Nassau County Museum of Art, Roslyn Harbor, New York, 1980
- The Michael and Dorothy Blankfort Collection, Curated by Maurice Tuchman and Anne Carnegie Edgerton, Los Angeles County Museum of Art, 1982
- Drawings by Painters, Curated by Richard Armstrong, Long Beach Museum of Art, Long Beach, California, 1982
- West Coast Realism, Curated by Lynn Gamwell, The Laguna Beach Museum of Art, Laguna Beach, California, 1983
- American Accents, Curated by Henry Geldzahler, Organized by the US Embassy to Canada.
- California: Idioms of Surrealism, Curated by Marie de Alcuaz, Fisher Gallery, University of Southern California, Los Angeles, 1983
- Frederick R. Weisman Foundation Volume One, Frederick Weisman Foundation, Los Angeles, 1984
- Ceeje Revisited, Curated by Josine Ianco-Starrels, Los Angeles Municipal Art Gallery, Los Angeles, 1984
- Crime and Punishment, Reflections of Violence in Contemporary Art, Curated by Jo Farb Hernandez, Triton Museum of Art, Santa Clara, California, 1984
- American Realism: Twentieth Century Drawings and Watercolors from the Glenn C. Janss Collection, San Francisco Museum of Modern Art, San Francisco, 1986
- California A-Z and Return, Curated by John Fitz Gibbon, The Butler Institute of American Art, Youngstown, Ohio, 1990
- Painting Beyond the Idea, Curated by Bennett Roberts, Manny Silverman Gallery, Los Angeles, 1995
- Murder, Curated by John Yau, Bergamot Station Arts Center, Santa Monica, California, 1995
- Hendler, Huerta, Kauffman, Curated by David Pagel, Studio la Citta, Verona, Italy, 2000
