= Wcisło =

Wcisło is a Polish surname. Notable people with the surname include:

- Emilia Wcisło (born 1942), Polish politician
- Marta Wcisło (born 1969), Polish politician
- Ryszard Wcisło (1933–2015), Polish scout leader
