= Krakowski =

Krakowski (Polish pronunciation: [kraˈkɔfski]; feminine: Krakowska; plural: Krakowscy) is a Polish surname. It is a toponymic surname referring to the city of Kraków and environs. It appears in various forms in other languages.

== Related surnames ==
Language	Masculine	Feminine
Polish	Krakowski	Krakowska
Belarusian (Romanization)	Кракоўскі (Krakoŭski)	Кракоўская (Krakoŭskaja, Krakouskaya, Krakouskaia)
Czech/Slovak	Krakovský	Krakovská
Hungarian	Krakovszki, Krakovszky, Krakowszky	
Latvian	Krakovskis	Krakovska
Romanian/Moldovan	Cracovschi	
Lithuanian	Krakauskas	Krakauskienė (married); Krakauskaitė (unmarried)
Russian (Romanization)	Краковский (Krakovskiy, Krakovskii, Krakovsky, Krakovskij)	Краковская (Krakovskaya, Krakovskaia, Krakovskaja)
Ukrainian (Romanization)	Краковський (Krakovskyi, Krakovskyy, Krakovskyj, Krakovsky)	Краковська (Krakovska)
Other	Krakowsky, Krakofsky, Krakofski, Krakauskis	

== People ==
- Kolowrat-Krakowsky, historic family from Central Europe
  - Count Sascha Kolowrat-Krakowsky
  - Feldmarschall Johann Karl, Graf von Kolowrat-Krakowsky
- Alex Krakovsky (born 1982), Ukrainian archivist and activist
- Alois Josef Krakovský z Kolovrat (1759–1833), Czech Catholic archbishop
- Andrzej Krakowski (born 1946), Polish-American filmmaker
- Emilia Krakowska (born 1940), Polish actress
- Jane Krakowski (born 1968), American actress
- Joe Krakauskas (1915–1960), Canadian baseball player
- Serhiy Krakovskyi (born 1960), Ukrainian footballer
- Solomon Krakovsky (1922–2016), American actor better known as Steven Hill
- Shmuel Krakowski (1926–2018), Polish-Israeli historian
- Wolf Krakowski (born 1947), Canadian Yiddish-speaking musician

== Other ==
- Krakowska, type of Polish sausage (kielbasa)
- Obwarzanek krakowski, braided ring-shaped bread
- Galeria Krakowska, shopping mall in Kraków
- Gazeta Krakowska, largest regional daily newspaper in Kraków
- Opera Krakowska
- Krakowska Street in Bydgoszcz

== See also ==
- Krakouer (disambiguation)
- Kraków County (powiat krakowski), an administrative division adjoining Kraków in southern Poland
