= Dolata =

Dolata is a Polish deverbal surname from the third-person singular present of the verb dolatać dolecieć, "to fly in", "to arrive, esp. quickly", i.e., meaning "the one who (quickly) arrives". It may refer to:

- Katarzyna Skowrońska-Dolata (born 1983), Polish volleyball player
- Ulrich Dolata (born 1959), German sociologist
- Zbigniew Dolata (born 1965), Polish politician
