= Podsiadło =

Podsiadło is a Polish surname. Notable people with the surname include:

- Dawid Podsiadło (born 1993), Polish singer-songwriter
- Jacek Podsiadło (born 1964), Polish writer
- Krzysztof Podsiadło (born 1962), Polish ice hockey player
- Paweł Podsiadło (born 1986), Polish handball player
- Sławomir Podsiadło, Polish chemist
