= Nowakowski =

Nowakowski (Polish pronunciation: [nɔvaˈkɔfski]; feminine: Nowakowska; plural: Nowakowscy) is a Polish-language surname. Derived from place names such as Nowakowo, it is related to the surnames Nowak and Nowakowicz.

Language	Masculine	Feminine
Polish	Nowakowski	Nowakowska
Belarusian (Romanization)	Навакоўскі (Navakoŭski)	Навакоўская (Navakoŭskaja, Navakouskaya, Navakouskaia)
Russian (Romanization)	Новаковский (Novakovsky, Novakovskiy, Novakovskij)	Новаковская (Novakovskaya, Novakovskaia, Novakovskaja)
Ukrainian (Romanization)	Новаківський (Novakivskyi, Novakivskyy, Novakivskyj)	Новаківська (Novakivska)

== People ==
- Anton Nowakowski (1897–1969), German organist and composer
- Bożena Nowakowska (born 1955), Polish hurdler
- Dariusz Nowakowski (born 1953), Polish judoka
- David Nowakowsky (1848–1921), composer, choirmaster and music teacher
- Emil Nowakowski (born 1974), Polish football midfielder
- Hubert Nowakowski (1919–2000), Polish footballer
- Ida Nowakowska (born 1990), Polish-American actress and singer
- Jakub Nowakowski (born 1924), Polish soldier and zoologist
- Jakub Nowakowski (born 2001), Polish footballer
- Jan Nowakowski (born 1994), Polish volleyball player
- Joanna Ewa Nowakowska (born 1989), Polish sports shooter
- Karol Nowakowski (born 1953), Polish-American inventor
- Karolina Nowakowska (born 1982), Polish actress
- Kenneth Nowakowski OBE (born 1958), bishop of the Ukrainian Catholic Eparchy of Holy Family of London
- Krystyna Nowakowska (1935–2019), Polish athlete
- Leon Nowakowski (1908–1944), Polish soldier
- Maria Nowakowska (born 1987), Polish beauty pageant
- Natalia Nowakowska (born 1977), English historian
- Piotr Nowakowski (born 1987), Polish volleyball player
- Piotr Tomasz Nowakowski (born 1974), Polish researcher
- Pola Nowakowska (born 1996), Polish volleyball player
- Richard Nowakowski (born 1955), Polish-German boxer
- Richard B. Nowakowski (1921–2007), American politician
- Richard C. Nowakowski (born 1933), American politician
- Riley Nowakowski (born 2002), American football player
- Robert C. Nowakowski, Rear Admiral in the United States Navy
- Seweryn Nowakowski (1894–1940), Polish politician
- Tadeusz Nowakowski (1917–1996), Polish writer and journalist
- Waldemar Nowakowski (born 1950), Polish politician
- Weronika Nowakowska-Ziemniak (born 1986), Polish biathlete
- Zofia Nowakowska (born 1988), Polish singer
- Aleksandr Yakovlevich Novakovsky, birth name of Alexander Nove (1915–1994), British economist
