= Młynarczyk =

Młynarczyk is a Polish surname meaning a "small miller". Notable people with the surname include:

- Aleksandra Młynarczyk-Gemza (born 1988), Polish writer
- Henryk Młynarczyk (born 1955), Polish politician
- Józef Młynarczyk (born 1953), Polish footballer
