= Ulrich Dolata =

German sociologist (born 1959)

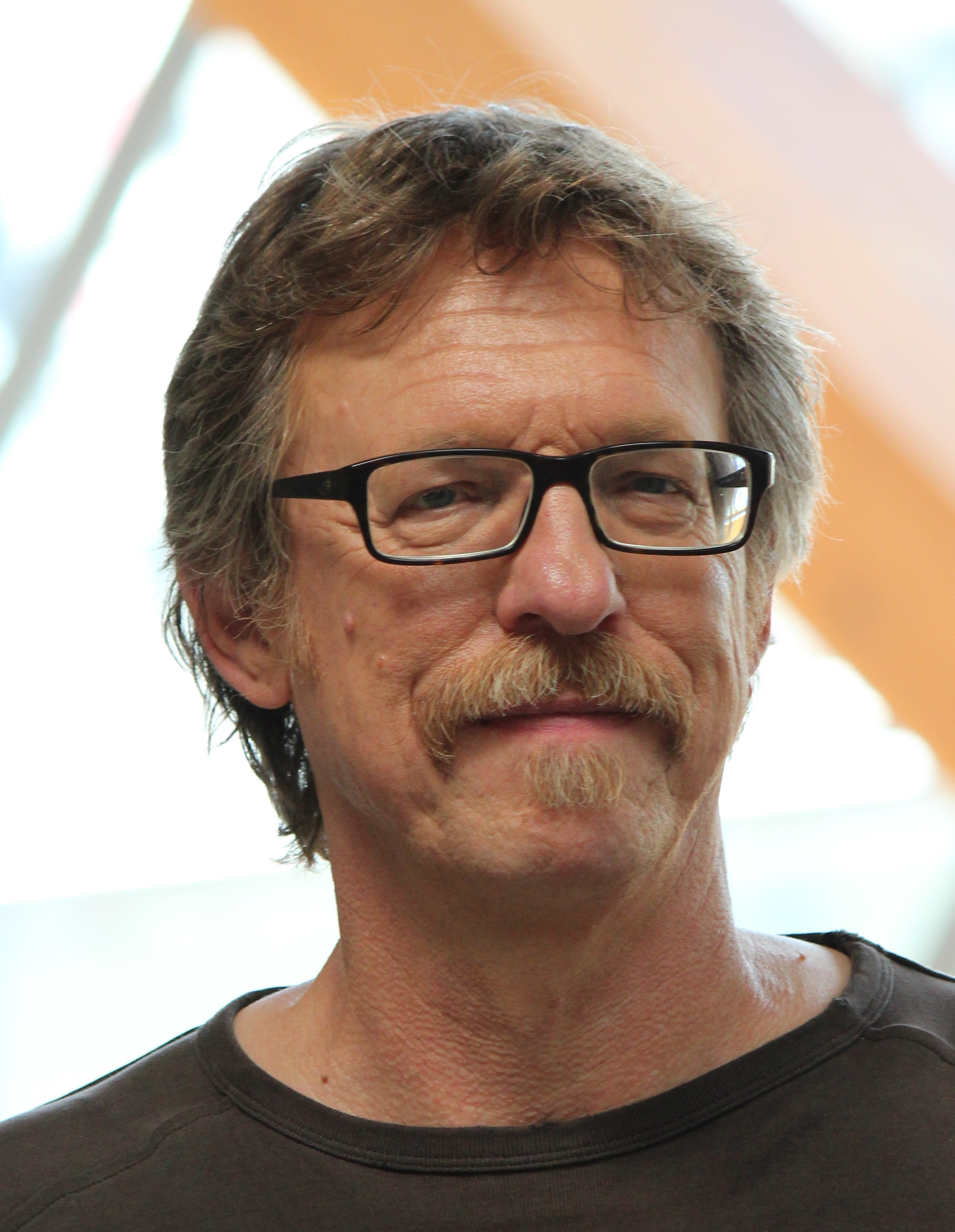
Ulrich Dolata

Ulrich Dolata (born 1959 in Dortmund) is a German sociologist.

== Education & career ==
Ulrich Dolata earned a graduate degree in economics (Diplom-Ökonom) at the University of Bremen in 1985, where he continued to complete a doctorate in economics and social sciences (Dr. pol.) in 1992 as well as a post-doctoral degree (habilitation) with a thesis on the sociology of technology in 2003. Starting with the mid of the 1980s, he worked at the University of Bremen and the Hamburg Institute for Social Research, followed by Artec (a research center for labor, environment and technology) at the University of Bremen, and the Max Planck Institute for the Study of Societies (MPIfG) in Cologne. In the academic year 2000–2001, he taught as a guest professor at the Technical University of Graz and was a Senior Fellow at the Institute for Advanced Studies in Science, Technology and Society (IAS-STS), Graz. Ulrich Dolata has been a member of the board of science and technology section of the German Sociological Association (Deutsche Gesellschaft für Soziologie, DGS) since 2007, and has served as its spokesperson between 2014 and 2018. Since 2011, he has also been a member of the advisory board of the Sociology of Science and Technology Network (SST-Net) of the European Sociological Association (ESA).

Since 2009, Ulrich Dolata has been teaching organizational and innovation sociology as full professor at the Institute for Social Sciences at the University of Stuttgart. His work and research focuses on organizational and economic sociology, on innovation research and technology policy as well as on the sociology of genetic engineering and the internet. He is proponent of what has been termed techno-sociological institutionalism.

== Publications (selection) ==
- Technological Innovations and Sectoral Change. Handbook of Innovation. Perspectives from the Social Sciences (eds Ingo Schulz-Schaeffer et al.). Cham: Springer, 281-298 (2026). ()
- Platform companies on the internet as a new organizational form. A sociological perspective (zusammen mit Jan-Felix Schrape). Innovation: The European Journal of Social Science Research 38(3), 1228-1247 (2025). ().
- Industry Platforms. A New Mode of Coordination in the Economy. SOI discussion paper 2024-02 (2024). ()
- Platform Regulation. Coordination of Markets and Curation of Sociality on the Internet. The Routledge Handbook of Smart Technologies (eds Heinz D. Kurz / Rita Strohmaier / Stella Zilian). London: Routledge, 455-475 (2022). ()
- Platform Architectures. The Structuration of Platform Companies on the Internet (together with Jan-Felix Schrape). SOI discussion paper 2022-01 (2022). ()
- Varieties of Internet Platforms and their Transformative Capacity. The Future of Work (eds Christian Suter / Jacinto Cuvi / Philip Balsiger / Mihaela Nedelcu). Zurich: Seismo, 100-116 (2021). ()
- The Digital Transformation of the Music Industry. The Second Decade: From Download to Streaming. SOI discussion paper 2020-04 (2020). ()
- Privatization, curation, commodification. Commercial platforms on the Internet. Österreichische Zeitschrift für Soziologie 44, Suppl. 1, 181-197 (2019). ()
- Collectivity and Power on the Internet. A Sociological Perspective (together with Jan-Felix Schrape). Dordrecht: Springer (2018).
- Social Movements and the Internet. The Sociotechnical Constitution of Collective Action. SOI discussion paper 2017-02 (2017). ()
- Apple, Amazon, Google, Facebook, Microsoft. Market Concentration - Competition - Innovation Strategies. SOI discussion paper 2017-01 (2017). ()
- Masses, Crowds, Communities, Movements. Collective Action in the Internet Age (together with Jan-Felix Schrape). Social Movement Studies 15, 1, 1–18 (2016). doi:10.1080/14742837.2015.1055722.
- The Transformative Capacity of New Technologies. A Theory of Sociotechnical Change. London / New York: Routledge (2013). ()
- Technological Innovations and Sectoral Change. Transformative Capacity, Adaptability, Patterns of Change: An Analytical Framework. Research Policy 38, 6, 1066–1076 (2009).
- International Innovative Activities, National Technology Competition and European Integration Efforts. Changing Governance of Research and Technology Policy. The European Research Area (eds Jakob Edler / Stefan Kuhlmann / Maria Behrens). Cheltenham: Edward Elgar, 271–289 (2003).
