= Fertig =

Fertig is a German word meaning "ready" or "finished".

As a surname, it may refer to:

- Beth Fertig, American journalist
- Craig Fertig (1942–2008), Oregon State University football coach
- George Fertig (1915–1983), Canadian artist
- Jack Fertig (1955–2012), astrologer and drag queen
- Kevin Fertig (born 1977), wrestler
- Lawrence Fertig (1898–1986), advertising executive and libertarian journalist and economic commentator
- M. Maldwin Fertig (1887–1972), American lawyer and politician
- Ralph Fertig (1930–2019), American social justice activist, lawyer, educator and author
- Wendell Fertig (1900–1975), American civil engineer and Philippine guerrilla leader

== See also ==
- Achtung, fertig, Charlie!, a 2003 German film
- Fertigation, application of nutrients to crops via irrigation
