= Kołodziejski =

Kołodziejski (feminine: Kołodziejska; plural: Kołodziejscy) is a Polish-language occupational surname derived from the occupation of kołodziej ("wheelwright"). Notable people with this surname include:

- Chris Kolodziejski (born 1961), American football player
- Cindy Kolodziejski (born 1962), German-born ceramic artist
- Henryk Kołodziejski (1884–1953), Polish historian and statesman
- Katarzyna Kołodziejska (born 1985), Polish handball player
- Leslie Kolodziejski (born 1958), American professor of electronics engineering
- Michał Kołodziejski (born 1975), Polish diplomat
- Witold Kołodziejski (born 1966), Polish journalist and statesman
