= Młynarski =

Młynarski, feminine: Młynarska is a Polish surname. Notable people with the surname include:

- Danuta Hübner née Młynarska (born 1948), Polish politician
- Emil Młynarski (1870–1935), Polish conductor
- Feliks Młynarski (1884–1972), Polish banker, philosopher and economist
  - Młynarski dilemma
- Mieczysław Młynarski (1956–2025), Polish basketball player and coach
- Nela Młynarska, ballerina, Arthur Rubinstein wife
- Tomasz Młynarski (born 1977), Polish political scientist
- Wojciech Młynarski (1941–2017), Polish musician

== See also ==
- Andrew Mynarski
- Młynarska Wola
