= Madeleine Stoner =

American sociologist (1937–2008)

- Born: September 13, 1937; New York City, U.S.
- Died: July 13, 2008; Los Angeles, California, U.S.
- Occupation: Sociologist
- Spouse: 3, including Ralph Fertig

Madeleine R. Stoner (September 13, 1937 - July 13, 2008) was an American sociologist. She was the Richard M. and Ann L. Thor Professor in Urban Social Development at the University of Southern California, and the author of two books about homelessness. In Inventing a Non-Homeless Future: A Public Policy Agenda for Preventing Homelessness, Stoner dismisses welfare programs as outdated and suggests affordable housing could alleviate homelessness. In The Civil Rights of Homeless People: Law, Social Policy, and Social Work Practice, Stoner argues that the homeless struggle to have access to welfare because the system is based on property rights.

== Selected works ==
- Stoner, Madeleine (1989). Inventing a Non-Homeless Future: A Policy Agenda for Preventing Homelessness. New York: Peter Lang. OCLC 645812303.
- Stoner, Madeleine (1995). The Civil Rights of Homeless People: Law, Social Policy, and Social Work Practice. New York: A. de Gruyter. ISBN 9780202305141. OCLC 300680923.
