= Puchała =

Puchała or Puchala is a Polish surname. It may refer to:

- Józef Achilles Puchała (1911–1943), Polish Franciscan friar
- Linda Puchala, American government official
