= Emil Nowakowski =

Polish footballer

Personal information
- Date of birth: 15 May 1974 (age 52)
- Place of birth: Lubin, Poland
- Height: 5 ft 10 in (1.78 m)
- Position: Midfielder

Senior career*
Years	Team	Apps	(Gls)
1992–1993	Zagłębie Lubin	30	(2)
1993	Górnik Polkowice		
1994–1996	Chrobry Głogów		
1996–1997	Central Jersey Riptide		
1997	Matera	5	(0)
1998	Górnik Wałbrzych		
1999	Śląsk Wrocław		
1999–2000	Zagłębie Lubin	14	(0)
2000	Śląsk Wrocław		
2000–2002	Górnik Polkowice		
2002–2004	Polonia Warsaw	23	(1)
2004–2007	Olympiacos Volos	53	(2)
2007–2008	Pierikos		
2008	Fostiras		
2008–2009	Oberlausitz Neugersdorf		
2009–2010	Prochowiczanka Prochowice		
2010–2011	Bobrzanie Bolesławiec		
2011	Konfeks Legnica		
2011–2014	Victoria Parchów		
- * Club domestic league appearances and goals

Emil Nowakowski (born 15 May 1974) is a Polish former professional footballer who played as midfielder, primarily in the Polish lower divisions. He has also spent time in the Polish top division and with teams in the United States, Italy, Greece and Germany. He is currently a coach at Zagłębie Lubin's academy.

In 1992, Nowakowski signed with Zagłębie Lubin. In 1993, he began the season with Lubin, spent a few games with Górnik Polkowice then finished the season with Chrobry Głogów. He remained with them through the 1995–96 season, then moved to the United States where he played the 1996 and 1997 seasons with the Central Jersey Riptide in the USISL. In autumn 1997, he moved to Italy where he signed with Serie D club Matera. At some point in the season, he returned to Poland to join Górnik Wałbrzych. In 1998, he began the season with second-tier side Śląsk Wrocław and finished it at Zagłębie Lubin. He was back with Śląsk for the 1999–2000 season. In autumn 2000, he moved to Górnik Polkowice. After two seasons, he transferred to Polonia Warsaw in the Polish top division. In 2004, he was sent to the Polonia's reserve team. He then moved to newly formed Greek club Olympiacos Volos from 2004 to 2007. In 2007, he transferred to Pierikos. In 2008, he joined Fostiras of the amateur Achaea Football Clubs Association. He then played for FC Oberlausitz Neugersdorf in Germany.
