= Central State Historical Archives of Ukraine in Kyiv =

The Central State Historical Archive of Ukraine in Kyiv (CSHAK) is one of the oldest and biggest archives in Ukraine, located at the Taras Shevchenko National University of Kyiv. It was founded in 1852 for storage of the work accomplished by the Kyiv Archeographic Commission.

== Description ==
The CSHAK contains documents on the history of Ukraine from the 19th century to the founding of the Grand Duchy of Lithuania and the Commonwealth (from the 14th to the end of the 18th century), as well as the Russian Empire (from the first half of the 17th century to the February Revolution of 1917 in Russia). There are also documents on the history of the Hetmanate (the other half of the 17th century to the 18th century).

The CSHAK stores documents about the history of Ukraine from 1369 until 1917. The oldest document is a certificate of Rus' praepostor Otto from Pilche dated 1369.

The CSHAK contains 2245 funds. Some of the archival funds are presented online.

== History ==
The archive was founded in 1852 as Kyiv Central Archive in the university of St. Volodymyr. Eventually it received funds from the Central Revolution Archive in Kharkiv and Kyiv Oblast Archive. During the occupation of Ukraine by Nazi Germany, the KCADA lost two-thirds of its holdings. Only what the Nazis had taken out of the city before the Soviet invasion of Kyiv survived.

In 2018, archivist and genealogist Alex Krakovsky filed a lawsuit against the archive for refusing to provide paid services to him for copying 100 sheets of archival documents dated from 1767. By the decision of the District Administrative Court of Kyiv, the legal statutes used to deny services to private citizens was declared illegal under Ukrainian law.
