= Przybysz =

Przybysz is a Polish surname literally meaning "the one who arrived". Notable people include:

- Daniel Przybysz (born 1988), Brazilian oncologist
- Kenneth Przybysz, American politician from Connecticut
- Natalia Przybysz (born 1983), Polish singer
- Ryszard Przybysz (1950–2002), Polish handball player
- Władysław Przybysz

== See also ==
- Przybyła
