= Kołodziejczak =

Kołodziejczak or Kolodziejczak (Polish pronunciation: [kɔwɔˈd͡ʑɛjt͡ʂak]) is an occupational surname derived from the occupation kołodziej, or wheelwright. Notable people with this surname include:

- Timothée Kolodziejczak (born 1991), French footballer
- Tomasz Kołodziejczak (born 1967), Polish writer
- Magdalena Kołodziejczak (born 1958), Polish politician
- Michał Kołodziejczak (born 1988), Polish politician
