= Stefan Kuhlmann =

German political scientist focussing on science, technology and society studies (STS)

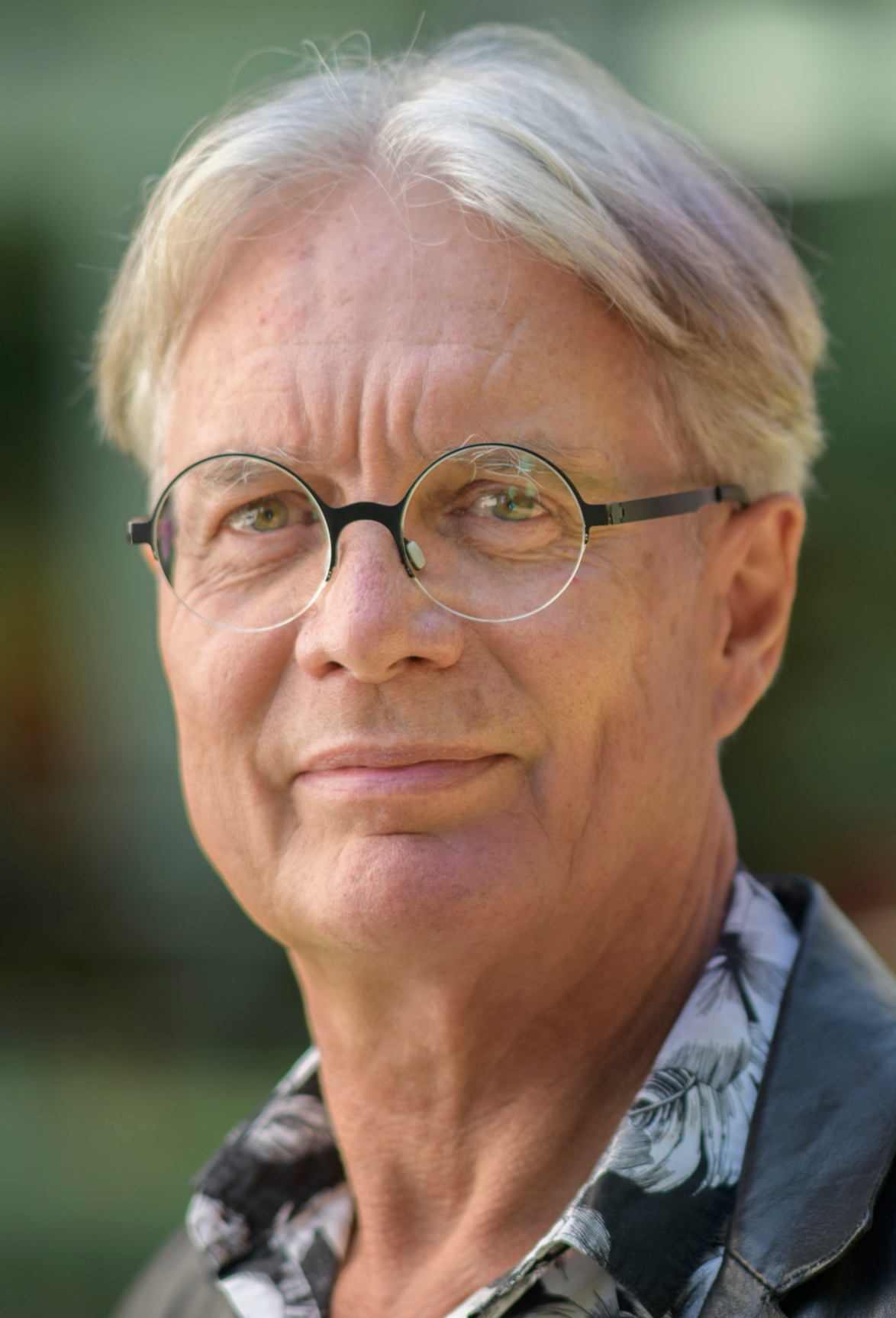
Stefan Kuhlmann (2019)

Stefan Kuhlmann is a German political scientist specialising in technological innovation, society and politics. He is professor emeritus of 'Science and Technology Studies' (STS) at the University of Twente.

== Biography ==
Raised in Marl, Germany, Kuhlmann studied history and political science at the Philipps University of Marburg from 1972 to 1978. From 1979 to 1988 he worked on 'informatization' of the public administration at the University of Kassel. He received his doctorate in 1986 and his habilitation in political science from the university in 1998.

From 1988 to 2006, Kuhlmann worked at the Fraunhofer Institute for Systems and Innovation Research (ISI) in Karlsruhe, where he has held leading positions since 1995. In 2001 he took up a professorship in Innovation Policy at the Copernicus Institute of Utrecht University. In 2006, Kuhlmann succeeded Arie Rip in the Chair of Foundations of Science, Technology, and Society at the University of Twente in Enschede, the Netherlands.

On 25 November 2011, Kuhlmann awarded an honorary doctorate from the University of Twente to Helga Nowotny, then President of the European Research Council (ERC).

From 2018 to 2021, he was the Academic Director of the Dutch PhD Research Training School Science, Technology, and Modern Culture (WTMC). He retired in 2022.

Stefan Kuhlmann is married to the sociologist Eva Maria Eckel.

== Research work ==
In the 1980s, as a member of the research group on informatization of public administration (Forschungsgruppe Verwaltungsautomation) at the University of Kassel, he studied processes of the computerization of public administration.

At the University of Utrecht (2001–2006) and since 2006 at the University of Twente, he researched and taught in the interdisciplinary field of Science and Technology Studies (STS), focusing on modalities of governance of science and technology in society.

Kuhlmann has co-edited several scientific journals, including Research Policy (Elsevier), the International Journal of Foresight and Innovation Policy (IJFIP), and Science and Public Policy (SPP).

Stefan Kuhlmann is co-founder (2010) and was President (2010–2015) of the Eu-SPRI Forum for Studies of Policies for Research and Innovation, a network of about twenty European research centres on this topic.

== Publications (selection) ==
- Computer als Mythos. In: Rammert, W. et al. (Hg.): Technik und Gesellschaft. Jahrbuch 3, Frankfurt a. M./New York 1985 (Campus), p. 91–106
- Computerbürokratie. Ergebnisse von 30 Jahren öffentlicher Verwaltung mit Informationstechnik, (1990, mit Hans Brinckmann) (Opladen, Westdeutscher Verlag)
- European Technology Policy in Germany, Heidelberg (Physica/Springer) (1995, mit G. Reger)
- Politikmoderation: Evaluationsverfahren in der Forschungs-und Technologiepolitik (1998), Baden-Baden: Nomos
- Moderation of Policy-making? Science and Technology Policy Evaluation beyond Impact Measurement: the Case of Germany. In: Evaluation (Sage), Vol. 4, No. 2, April 1998, 130–148; doi:10.1177/13563899822208491
- Improving Distributed Intelligence in Complex Innovation Systems. Final report of the Advanced Science & Technology Policy Planning Network (ASTPP), a Thematic Network of the European Targeted Socio-Economic Research Programme (1999, with Boekholt, P. / Georghiou, L. / Guy, K. / Héraud, J.-A. / Laredo. Ph. / Lemola, T. / Loveridge, D. / Luukkonen, T. / Polt, W. / Rip, A. / Sanz-Menendez, L. / Smits, R.)
- Evolution von Staatlichkeit - mit einem Exkurs zu N. Elias‘ „Soziogenese des Staates“. In: Politische Vierteljahresschrift (PVS), 41, 2000/4, 623–646
- Governance of Innovation Policy in Europe – Three Scenarios. In: Research Policy, Special Issue „Innovation Policy in Europe and the US: New Policies in New Institutions“, ed. by H. K. Klein, S. Kuhlmann, and P. Shapira, vol. 30, issue 6/2001, 953–976 (DOI:10.1016/S0048-7333(00)00167-0)
- Learning from Science and Technology Policy Evaluation: Experiences from the United States and Europe, (2003, mit P. Shapira), Cheltenham: Elgar
- The rise of systemic instruments in innovation policy. In: Int. J. Foresight and Innovation Policy (IJFIP), Vol. 1, Nos. 1/2, (mit R. Smits, 2004) S. 4–32, doi:10.1504/IJFIP.2004.004621,
- Functions of Innovation Systems: A new approach for analysing technological change. In: Technological Forecasting & Social Change, vol. 74/4, 413–432 (2007, with Hekkert, M.P.; Suurs, R.A.A.; Negro, S.; Smits, R.E.H.M.)
- The Theory and Practice of Innovation Policy. An International Research Handbook, (2010, mit R. Smits, P. Shapira)
- Responsibility Navigator, Karlsruhe/Germany (2016, with Edler, J., Ordóñez-Matamoros, G., Randles, S., Walhout, B., Gough, C., Lindner, R), Fraunhofer ISI www.responsibility-navigator.eu.
- Research Handbook on Innovation Governance for Emerging Economies: Towards Better Models, (2017, mit G. Ordóñez-Matamoros), Cheltenham: Elgar
- Next Generation Innovation Policy and Grand Challenges, Science and Public Policy 45/4, (2018, with A. Rip) S. 448–454, doi:10.1093/scipol/scy011
- The tentative governance of emerging science and technology—A conceptual introduction, Research Policy 48, (2019, with Stegmaier, P., Konrad, K.) S. 1091–1097, doi:10.1016/j.respol.2019.01.006.
- Handbook on Science and Public Policy, (2019, mit D. Simon, J. Stamm, W. Canzler), Cheltenham: Elgar
- Global resilience through knowledge-based cooperation: a new Protocol for Science Diplomacy. In: F1000Research (2021, with Aukes E.; Wilsdon J; Ordóñez-Matamoros G.) 10:827 (https://doi.org/10.12688/f1000research.55199.1).
- The New Role of the State for Transformative Innovation - International Research Handbook (2026, with Cantner, U.; Fornahl, D.), Cheltenham: Elgar
- Technologies of Discontinuation—Towards Transformative Policies (2026, with Stegmaier, P.; Joly, P.-B.; Johnstone, P.; Stirling, A.; Barbier, M.), Cheltenham: Elgar
