= Ralph Fertig =

American activist and lawyer (1930–2019)

- Born: February 24, 1930; Chicago, Illinois, U.S.
- Died: March 28, 2019 (aged 89); Los Angeles, California, U.S.
- Education: Columbia University; University of Chicago; UCLA School of Law
- Occupation(s): Social worker, Activist, lawyer, educator, EEOC Administrative judge, author
- Spouses: Ann Holcombe, Marjorie Hays, Madeleine Stoner
- Children: 2 sons, 3 daughters

Ralph Fertig (February 24, 1930 – March 28, 2019) was an American social justice activist, lawyer, educator and author who in 1973 was described by the Washington Post as, the "conscience of Washington, D.C." When he died in 2020, The Los Angeles Times said he was "the conscience of L.A.".

== Early life and education ==
Ralph David Fertig was born on February 24, 1930, to a Jewish family in Chicago, Illinois. He graduated from the University of Chicago then Columbia University with undergraduate and master's degrees in social work, and about twenty years later (in 1979) Fertig graduated from the UCLA School of Law and became an attorney.

== Career ==
Fertig became an anti-segregationist activist early in his life in Chicago, and eventually became active throughout the country, including the Southern United States, and he played an organizing and leading role among civil rights activists, including the Freedom Riders. He was arrested, severely beaten and jailed for his activism in Selma, Alabama, in 1961. He helped organize the March on Washington for Jobs and Freedom on August 28, 1963. He was a community organizer and first executive director of the Southeast Neighborhood House in Anacostia, D.C., then later became executive director of the Washington Metropolitan Planning and Housing Association until 1973, when he moved to Los Angeles, California.

As the new executive director of the Greater Los Angeles Community Action Agency, which oversaw the distribution of hundreds of millions of dollars each year to organizations working in communities on issues of antipoverty, job training, child care, education, community development, etc., Fertig encountered an agency riven with corruption. His efforts to eliminate corruption led then-police chief Ed Davis to order Fertig and other staff to wear bullet-proof vests (provided by the LAPD) to work.

Eventually, at Fertig's urging, Mike Wallace and his "60 Minutes" crew came to Los Angeles and produced a segment revealing the corruption, which helped end it. Ralph Fertig then resigned with honor and entered UCLA Law School. Upon graduation, Fertig practiced law, for unions, plaintiffs and progressive organizations. He soon focused to specialize in civil rights cases. He became a trial counsel at the L.A. office of the EEOC Equal Employment Opportunity Commission (EEOC) and later served as a federal administrative judge for the Los Angeles EEOC. He was the executive director of the Greater Los Angeles Community Action Agency, and a president of the Humanitarian Law Project. He wrote a best-selling novel, Love and Liberation. From 2003 to 2016, he taught Social Justice at the University of Southern California, and he (co-)authored books about social justice.

== Personal life and death ==
Fertig was married three times; he had two sons, Jack and David, and three daughters, Katie, Karen & Jill (Karen and Jill were Marj's daughter from her previous marriage.) Divorced from his first wife Ann in 1968, His second wife, Marjorie Hays Fertig, died in 2002. His third wife, Madaleine Stoner, died in 2008.

Fertig resided in Westwood near UCLA. In his later years he attended the University Synagogue, then Leo Baeck Temple in Bel Air. His memoir, A Passion for Justice was published in 2018.

Fertig died of Parkinson's disease in Los Angeles, on March 28, 2019, at age 89.

== Selected works ==
- Fertig, Ralph (2001). Love and Liberation: When the Jews Tore Down the Ghetto Walls. Writers Club Press.
- Fertig, Ralph D.; Rose, Joshua S. (2007). 100 Years of Social Work at USC 1906-2006: A History in Words and Pictures. Los Angeles, California: University of Southern California, School of Social Work. ISBN 9781427622396. OCLC 191548205.
- Fertig, Ralph (2018). A Passion for Justice: One Man's Dedication to Civil Rights. Pittsburgh, Pennsylvania: Dorrance Publishing Company. ISBN 9781480953321. OCLC 1041904321.
