= Lynn Gamwell =

American art historian (born 1943)

Lynn Gamwell (born 1943) is an American nonfiction author and art curator known for her books on art history, the history of mathematics, the history of science, and their connections.

Gamwell has a bachelor's degree from the University of Illinois at Chicago, an MFA from Claremont Graduate School, and a PhD from the University of California, Los Angeles. She is a faculty member at the School of Visual Arts in New York, and she was director of the art museum at the State University of New York at Binghamton. Her curated exhibitions have traveled to the Jewish Museum in New York, the Renwick Gallery of the Smithsonian American Art Museum in Washington, DC, and the Wien Museum Karlsplatz in Vienna, Austria.

Her books include:

- Conjuring the Void: The Art of Black Holes, (MIT Press, 2025)
- Exploring the Invisible: Art, Science, and the Spiritual, revised and expanded edition (Princeton University Press, 2020)
- Mathematics and Art: A Cultural History (Princeton University Press, 2016)
- Dreams 1900-2000: Science, Art, and the Unconscious Mind (author and editor; Cornell University Press, 2000)
- Madness in America: Cultural and Medical Perceptions of Mental Illness before 1914 (with Nancy Tomes; Cornell University Press, 1994).
- Sigmund Freud and Art: His Personal Collection of Antiquities (author and editor; Harry N. Abrams, 1989)
