= Konfeks Legnica =

Polish football club

- Full name: Dziewiarsko-Odzieżowy Klub Sportowy; Konfeks Legnica
- Founded: 2 December 1971; 54 years ago
- Ground: Municipal Stadium
- Capacity: 900
- Chairman: Marek Kucharski
- Manager: Maciej Białas
- League: Regional league Legnica
- 2023–24: Regional league Legnica, 4th of 16
- Website: http://www.konfeks-legnica.com

Klub Sportowy Konfeks Legnica is a Polish football team based in Legnica, founded in 1971. Currently, Konfeks are playing in the Legnica group of the regional league, the sixth level of Polish football.

The club's best achievement was reaching the third tier of Polish football during the 1991–92 through 1993–94 seasons.
