= Sławomir Podsiadło =

Polish chemist

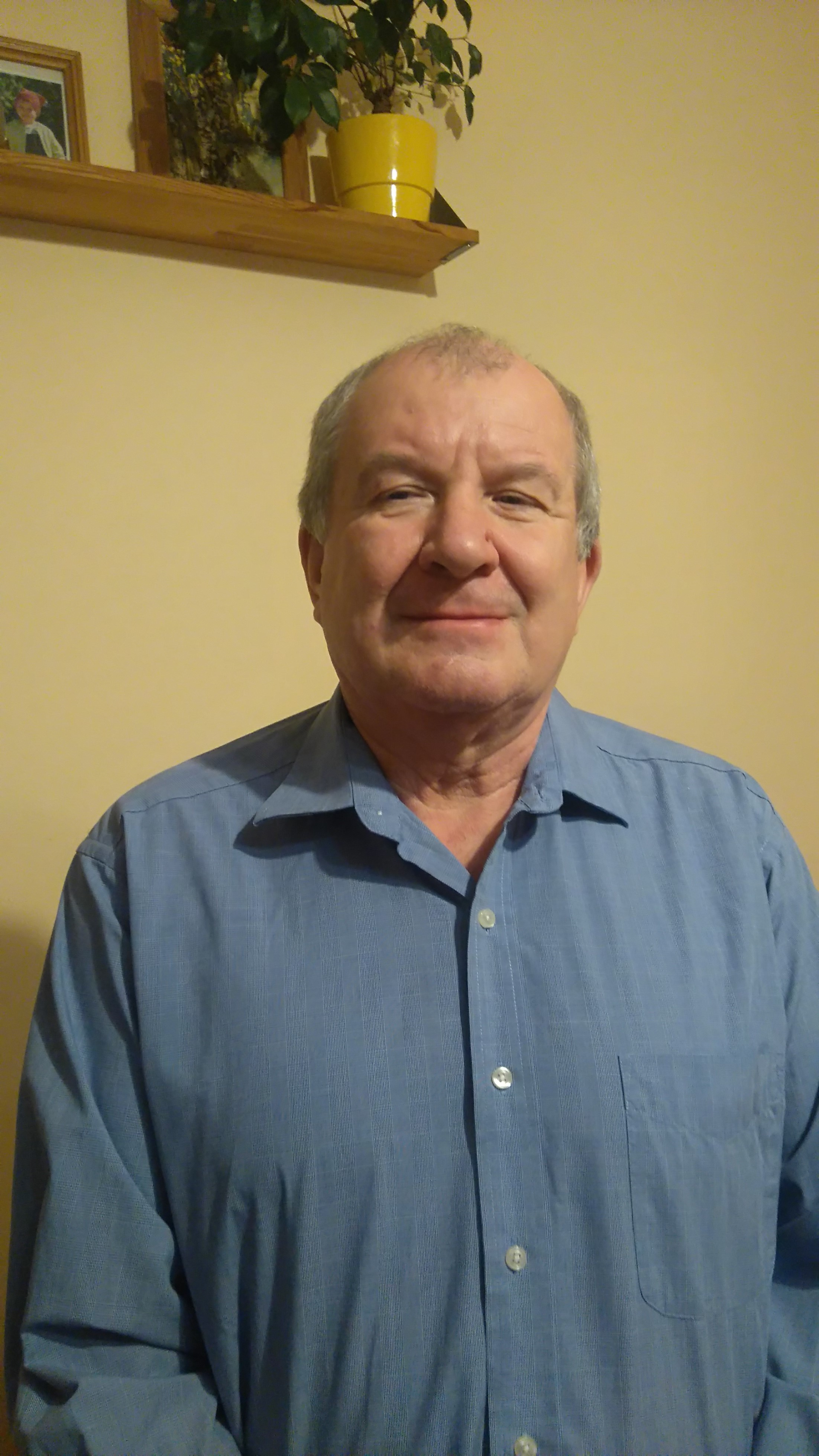
Sławomir Podsiadło

Sławomir Podsiadło is a Polish chemist. He studied chemistry at the Faculty of Chemistry of the Warsaw University of Technology. After graduating in 1974, he joined the staff of the Faculty of Chemistry of the Warsaw University of Technology. In 1980 he received a PhD degree and in 1990 he was granted a DSc degree. In 1991 he was appointed the head of the Laboratory of Non-oxygen Compounds at Faculty of Chemistry of the Warsaw University of Technology. Sławomir Podsiadło is the author of 85 original scientific publications, 12 patents and three books in the area of non-oxygen compounds and nanotechnology.

His most widely cited publication is Zając M, Gosk J, Kamińska M, Twardowski A, Szyszko T, Podsiadło S. Paramagnetism and antiferromagnetic d–d coupling in GaMnN magnetic semiconductor. Applied Physics Letters. 2001 Oct 8;79(15):2432-4., which has been cited 165 times according to Google Scholar
