= Alex Krakovsky =

Ukrainian archivist

- Олександр Краковський
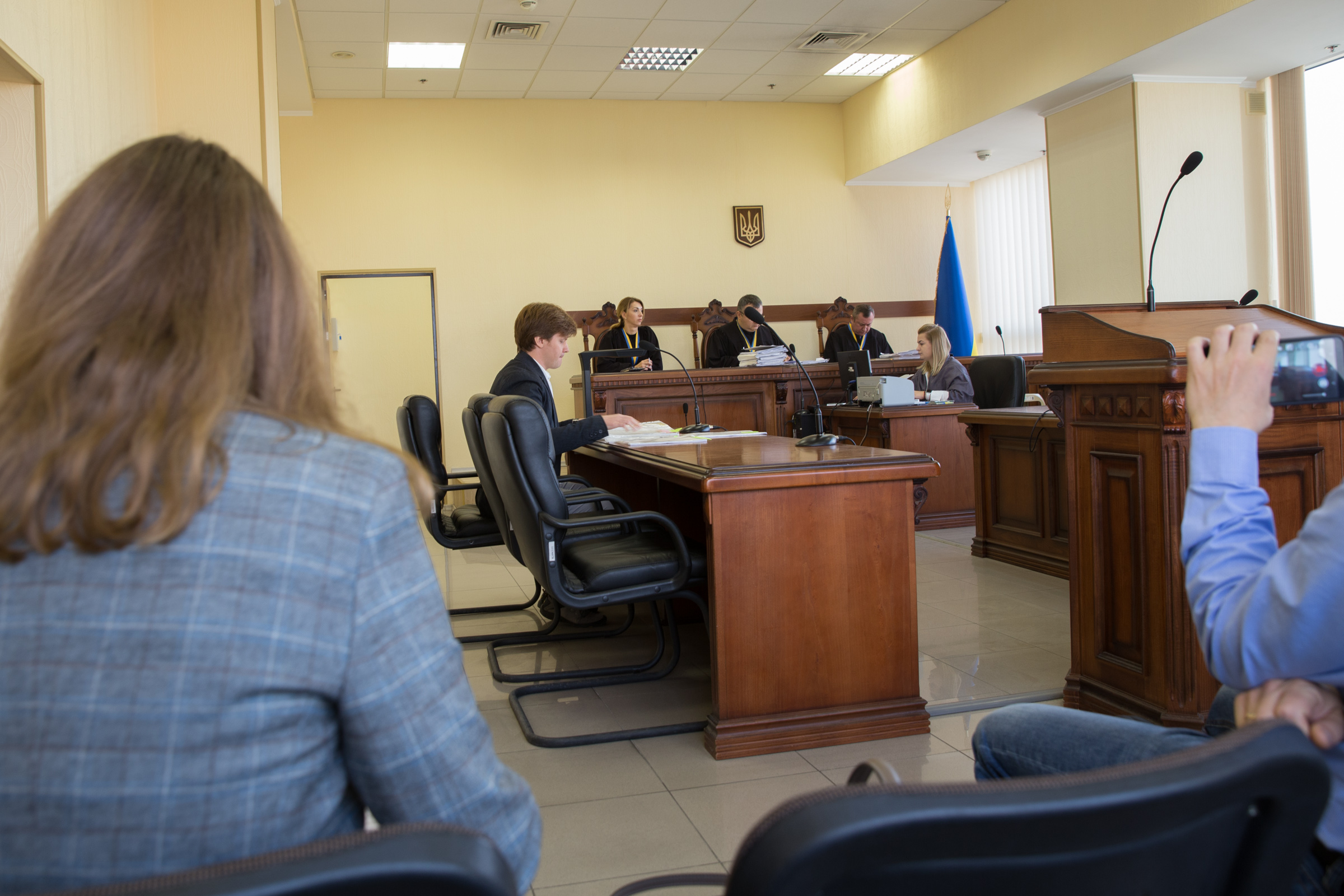
- Krakovsky (front seated) in 2019 at the Kyiv Court of Appeal. Alex Krakovsky vs State Archives of Kyiv Region. Case 761-40087-18
- Born: Alexander Krakovsky; February 28, 1982 (age 44); Ukraine
- Years active: 2017–present
- Known for: Archiving and activism

Alexander Krakovsky (Ukrainian: Олександр Краковський; born 28 February 1982) is a Jewish-Ukrainian archivist, activist, and genealogist. He is a leader in the Jewish genealogical community in efforts to legalize the digitization of Jewish records from Ukrainian historical government archives.

== Career ==
Krakovsky began doing genealogical research in 2011, and after requesting copies of original documents from archives in Lviv, was told that he would be required to pay 116,000 Hryvnia ($4,600 USD) to obtain them. Upset with the situation, Krakovsky began suing archives for more equitable access to historical documents. In 2019, he sued the Ministry of Justice after they banned the copying of documents by private individuals that were larger than letter size or contained in books thicker than 1½ inches, as well as barring private citizens from paying for digital copies. On October 3, 2019, the Kyiv District Administrative Court ruled that the law Krakovsky sued over was illegal under Ukrainian law.

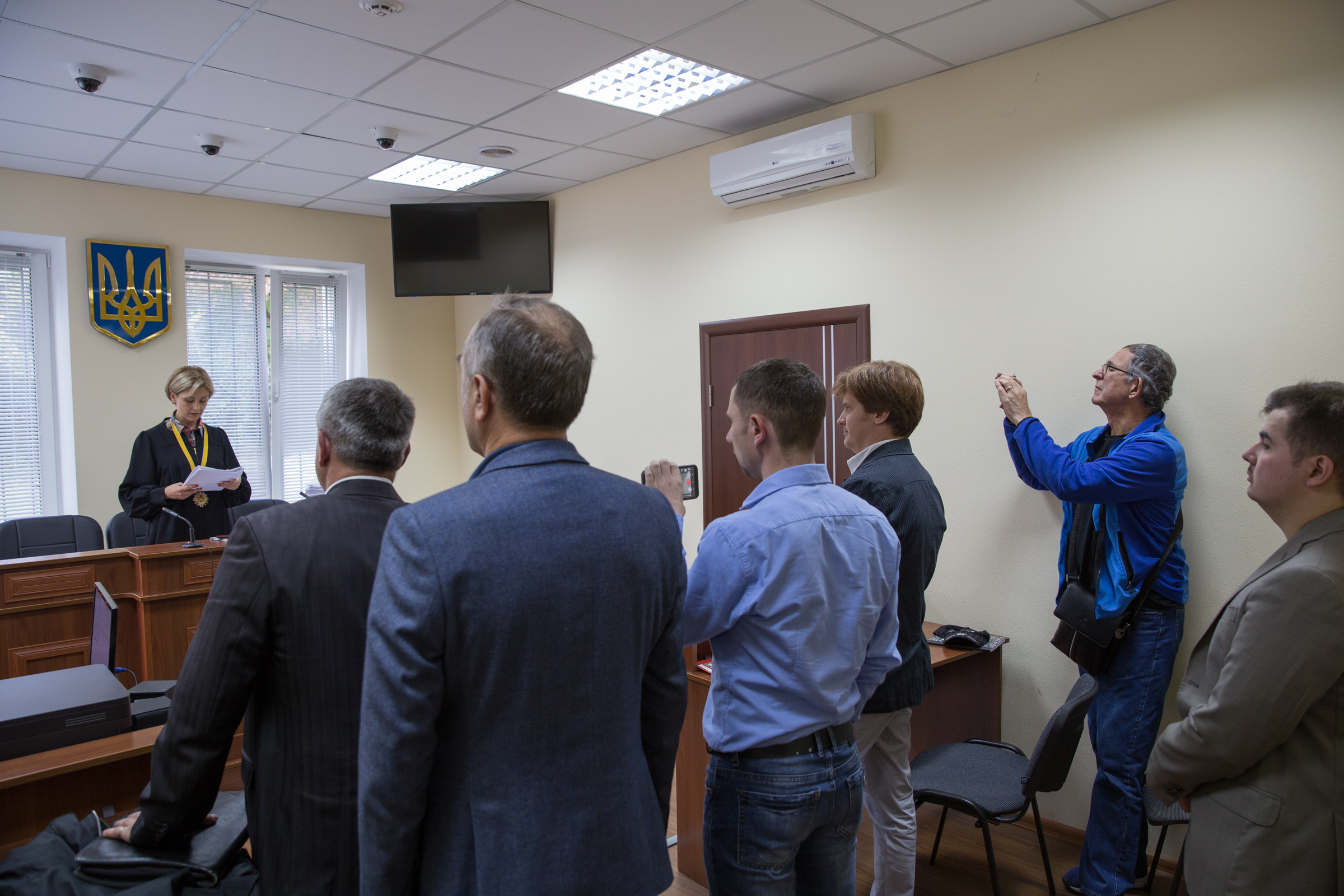
October 3, 2019. Alex Krakovsky vs The Ministry of Justice of Ukraine. Case 826-17353-18. This lawsuit opened up a new era in digitizing Ukrainian Archives.

He has also sued the Regional Archives of the Zhytomyr Oblast due to lack of consistent access to documents, stating "If the director [of the archive] does not like you, you may not be given access under any pretext: the document is in poor condition, you will damage it, your iPhone [camera], even without a flash, weathers it, and many other absurd reasons." He has successfully sued over a dozen Ukrainian governmental archive divisions in court under freedom of information laws due to restrictive policies that prevents fair access to archivists and researchers. He argues that free access to historical archives falls under Article 10 of the European Convention on Human Rights and is precedent under Kenedi v. Hungary.

Besides unfair access, Krakovsky has been outspoken in regards to employee conduct towards visitors to archives, alleging that in the Central State Historical Archives of Ukraine in Kyiv an employee in the reading room, a Donbas separatist, would become aggressive towards readers and showed open "contempt" for the Ukrainian language. He also alleged that there was preferential treatment towards Russian researchers in Kyiv archives and that Ukrainians were not given access to the same resources that Russians received. In 2017, he spoke at a conference organized by the Office of the Ukrainian Parliament Commission for Human Rights and the Center for Democracy and Rule of Law on the lack of archival transparency in Ukraine.

Since 2017, Krakovsky has led an effort in archiving many thousands of Jewish metric books, revision lists, and other historical records contained in Ukrainian archives by digitally scanning them and uploading them to an open-access database on the Ukrainian Wikisource.

In 2020, a GoFundMe was started to croudsource donations to purchase scanning equipment to expedite scanning archival documents. As of August 2023, over $35,000 has been raised.

=== Genealogical research ===
In addition to archiving Ukrainian records, Krakovsky often gives talks and presentations on how to begin researching genealogy and how to utilize the records that he has helped scan. JewishGen, an online non-profit genealogical organization, has indexed over 1 million individual records contained in the books archived by Krakovsky allowing for free access to researchers.

== Personal life ==
Krakovsky is the deputy chairman for the board of the Kyiv Center for Genealogical Research.

His mother was born in the village of Velyka Sevastyanivka in the Cherkasy Oblast.
