= Przybylski =

Przybylski (feminine Przybylska, plural Przybylscy) is a Polish surname, it may refer to:

- Anna Przybylska (1978–2014), Polish actress and model
- Antoni Przybylski (1913–1984), Polish-Australian astronomer
  - Przybylski's Star, named for him
- Bronisław Kazimierz Przybylski (1941–2011), Polish composer and educator
- Jerzy Przybylski (1923–1999), Polish actor
- Mariusz Przybylski (born 1982), Polish footballer
- Sława Przybylska (born 1932), Polish singer
- Stanisław Przybylski (1931–2010), Polish modern pentathlete
- Wojciech Przybylski (1939–2021), Polish football manager
