= Domagała =

Domagała (Polish pronunciation: [dɔmaˈɡawa]) is a surname of Polish language origin, derived from the verb domagać (to demand), "the one who demands". Notable people with this surname include:

- Cezary Domagała (born 1961), Polish actor
- Damian Domagała (born 1998), Polish volleyball player
- Jacek Domagała (born 1947), Polish composer
- Jan Domagała (1896–unknown), Polish prisoner
- Łukasz Domagała (born 1987), Polish athlete
- Marian Domagała (1919–1976), Polish lawyer
- Michael Domagala (born 1995), Canadian football player
- Paweł Domagała (born 1984), Polish actor
- Samantha Holmes-Domagala (born 1977), Canadian ice hockey player
- Sebastian Domagała (born 1973), Polish actor
- Steven Domagala (born 1975), Photographer
- Tadeusz Domagała (born 1937), Polish art historian
- Tomasz Domogała (born 1985), Polish businessman
- Waldemar Domagała (1946–2007), Polish architect
- Weronika Domagała (born 1991), Polish tennis player
