= Brodowo =

Brodowo may refer to the following places:

- Brodowo, Greater Poland Voivodeship (west-central Poland)
- Brodowo, Masovian Voivodeship (east-central Poland)
- Brodowo, Podlaskie Voivodeship (north-east Poland)
- Brodowo, Działdowo County in Warmian-Masurian Voivodeship (north Poland)
- Brodowo, Ełk County in Warmian-Masurian Voivodeship (north Poland)
