= Emilia Wcisło =

Emilia Wcisło (born 30 July 1942 in Rzeszów, General Government) was a Polish politician, Members of the Sejm of the Polish People's Republic (1985–1989).

== Awards and decorations ==
- 1989: Knight's Cross of the Order of Polonia Restituta (PRL)
- Gold Cross of Merit
- Silver Cross of Merit
