= Łatacz =

Łatacz is a Polish language occupational surname literally meaning "cobbler" or "patcher". Łatacz or Latacz may refer to:

- Joachim Latacz (born 1934), German classical philologist
- Ewald Latacz (1885–1953), Silesian politician, and lawyer
