= Aleksandra Młynarczyk-Gemza =

Polish writer, photographer, and performer (born 1988)

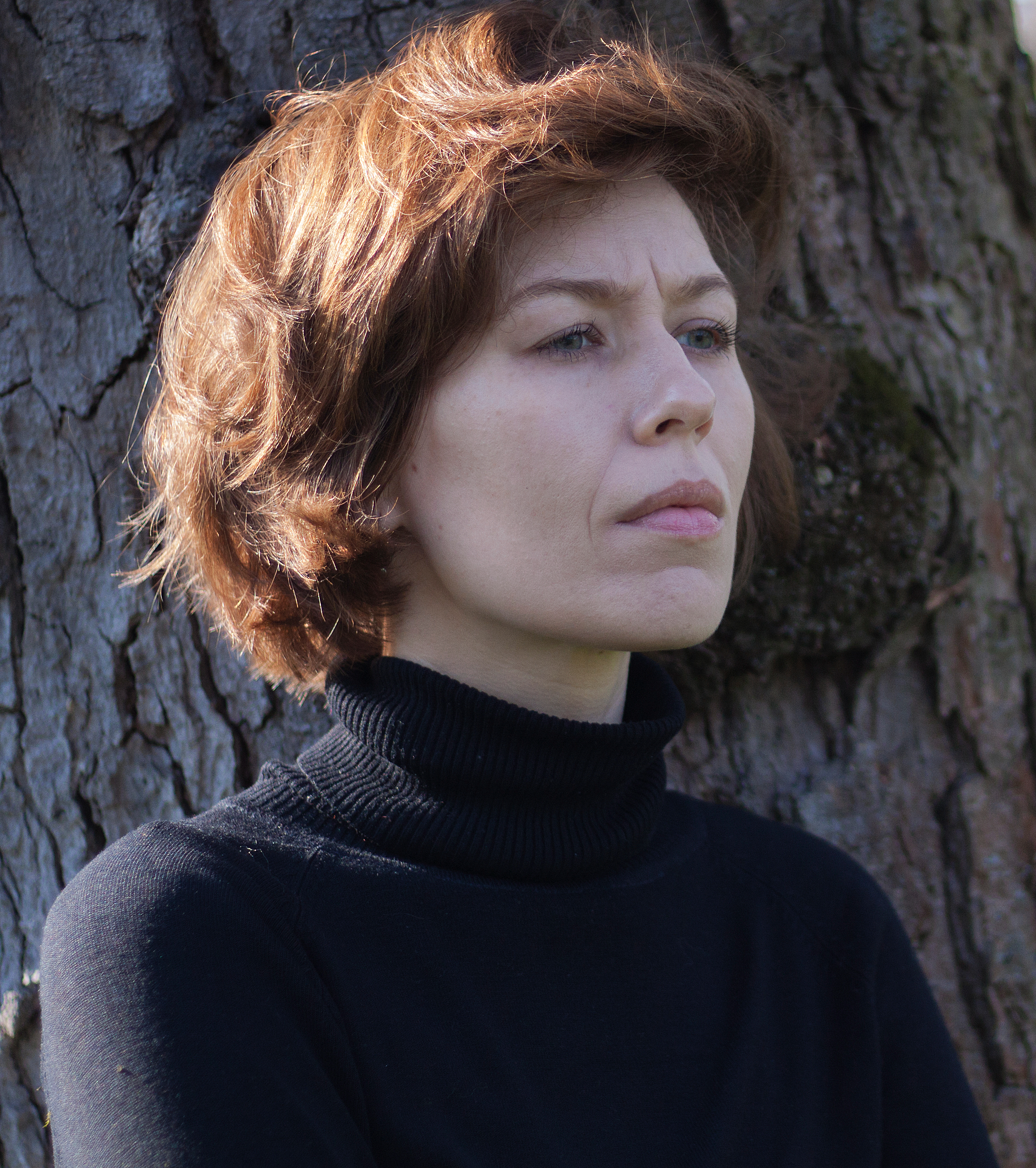
- Aleksandra Młynarczyk-Gemza, 2023
- Born: 4 September 1988 (age 37); Żywiec
- Citizenship: Polish
- Occupations: Writer, photographer, performer

Aleksandra Młynarczyk-Gemza (born 4 September 1988) is a visual artist, photographer, performer and writer.

== Biography ==
She graduated from the Faculty of Art of the Pedagogical University of Kraków (2008–2013) and the Faculty of Painting of the Jan Matejko Academy of Fine Arts in Kraków (2013–2015). In 2023 she obtained a doctorate at the Pedagogical University in Kraków.

== Books ==
- W stronę integracji cienia. Kobiecy foto-rytuał. Kraków: Universitas. 2022.
- Zapiski wariatki. Kraków: Znak. 2022.
- Płodozmian. Teksty zebrane z lat 2005–2020. Warszawa: Pamoja Press. 2022.

== Awards and nominations ==
- Nomination for the Nike Award for Zapiski wariatki (2023)
