= Madej =

Madej is a surname. Notable people with this surname include:

- Łukasz Madej (born 1982), Polish footballer
- Róbert Madej (born 1981), Slovak attorney and politician
- Shane Madej (born 1986), American writer and producer
