= Szukała =

Szukała is a surname of Polish language origin, derived from the verb szukać (to search), "the one who searches". Notable people with this surname include:

- Łukasz Szukała (born 1984), polish footballer
- Rafał Szukała (born 1971), Polish butterfly swimmer
- Stan Szukala (1918–2003), American basketball player
- Tadeusz Szukała (born 1948), Polish politician, farmer, construction engineer, entrepreneur, M.P. (2001)
