= Kołodziej =

Kołodziej (Polish pronunciation: [kɔˈwɔdʑɛi̯]) is a Polish surname meaning "wheelwright". Notable people with the surname include:

- Dariusz Kołodziej (born 1982), Polish footballer
- Janusz A. Kołodziej (born 1959), Polish politician
- Janusz Kołodziej (born 1984), Polish speedway rider
- Miriam Kolodziejová (born 1997), Czech tennis player
- Paweł Kołodziej (born 1980), Polish boxer
- Piast Kołodziej (c. 740–861 AD), Polish semi-legendary figure
- Ross Kolodziej (born 1978), American football player
- Sławomir Kołodziej (born 1961), Polish mathematician
- Walter Kolodziej, American politician
- Władysław Kołodziej (1897–1978), pioneer of modern Paganism in Poland
