= Witold Przybyło =

Polish engineer, civil servant (born 1953)

Witold Przybyło (born 1953) is Polish engineer and civil servant. At various times he served governor, mayor (1990–1994), and deputy mayor of Sanok. For his service he was decorated with the Badge "For Merit to Sanok".
