= Cindy Kolodziejski =

German ceramic artist

Cindy Kolodziejski (born 1962 in Augsburg, Germany) is a contemporary ceramic artist living and working in Venice, California. She has been showing her work in solo and group exhibitions since 1986 in the United States, Europe, and Asia, and is represented in public and private collections domestically and abroad.

== Work ==
The bodies of Kolodziejski's vessels range from traditional forms such as teapots, urns, and tureens to adaptations of laboratory items such as beakers and separatory funnels. Some pieces are suspended from external frames; others are freestanding. She combines ornamentation from multiple sources, using slip-cast pieces molded from various objects and drawing from a wide variety of periods, styles, and uses. As Kolodziejski says:

I like to defy conventions about what goes with what. A vessel that ends up looking as though it sprang whole from the Victorian, the baroque, or the classical period will actually be a composite of forms as contemporary as a Windex bottle, as old-fashioned as a part from a 1930s lamp, as recognizable as watch gears. Yet the entire cast-and-assembled object will give the impression of going back at least a hundred years.

Kolodziejski's ceramic vessels have smooth surfaces onto which she has painted figurative imagery. The content of this painting often features ironic formal, visual, and literal interplay, and frequently hinges on the use of suggestive puns. As Kolodziejski has said, "What I paint on one side is often in counterpoint to the opposite side. I like to combine images that are intentionally provocative, demanding consideration and contemplation from the viewer." Some examples of juxtaposed imagery in Kolodziejski's work include: Apollo and his chariot on one side with spacecraft from NASA's Apollo missions on the other; an urn with twins in utero on one face and a pared apple on the other; and the torso of a woman as she fingers her pearl necklace opposite two hands peeling a cucumber.

Discussing Kolodziejski's use of this binary device and its relationship to the often sexual implications of her imagery, writer David Pagel has said:

Although cylinders, spheres, and other three-dimensional forms with curved surfaces have no "fronts" or "backs," Kolodziejski treats them divisively, consistently positioning pairs of images that cannot be seen simultaneously. For example, one "side" of Pearl Necklace (1999) presents a woman in a black evening dress rolling a single pearl of her long necklace between two fingers, as if utterly bored or more than slightly nervous. The other "side" of the slender, hourglass-shaped pitcher depicts a big green cucumber being peeled by a pair of hands. At the pitcher's thin "waist," the cucumber nearly disappears. Its extreme attentuation mirrors what actually happens to cucumbers when they're peeled too vigorously. To walk around the piece is to follow a brief recto-verso drama whose most resonant metaphors hit viewers of both sexes below the belt. Sometimes a cucumber is just a cucumber and a pearl necklace is not slang for a blowjob, but Kolodziejski's promiscuous pitcher suggests otherwise.

In another series, Kolodziejski has focused on biological and scientific imagery, painting skeletal structures, preserved animals, and various cellular groupings, for example. These images are often painted on ceramic forms in the shape of laboratory vessels such as separatory funnels suspended from metal clamps. Kolodziejski's most recent collection of sculpture is titled Reversal of Fountain.

In recent years, Kolodziejski has won awards from the Virginia A. Groot Foundation, the J. Paul Getty Trust, the Durfee Foundation, and the City of Los Angeles. She received a Bachelor of Fine Arts degree in 1986 from Otis Art Institute, where she studied with ceramist Ralph Bacerra. In 1999 she completed a Masters of Fine Arts at CSU Long Beach, having studied there with ceramist Tony Marsh.
