= List of most common surnames in European countries =

This article contains lists of the most common surnames in most of the countries of Europe, including Armenia, Kosovo, and five transcontinental countries but excluding Cyprus and five European microstates. Countries are arranged in alphabetical order.

== Albania ==
At the moment, listings for the most common names are unavailable for Albania. However the most common names include the following:

- Common names denoting profession. Of these, religious professional names have been particularly widespread, including Hoxha (a Muslim priest, Sunni or Bektashi, with its variant Hoxhaj), Prifti (a Christian priest, Catholic or Orthodox), Shehu (a Bektashi priest) and Dervishi (Bektashi clergy). Bektashi itself is also a common surname. Ironically, Hoxha was the surname of Enver Hoxha, the leader of Communist Albania who banned all religions. There are numerous other professional names which are not as common. Begu also denotes a former ruler and also the surname(s) Gjoni or Gjonaj.
- Common names which originated as patrinomials. Common names of this sort include Leka or Lekaj (Alex), Gjoni or Gjonaj (John), Murati (Murad), Mehmeti (Mehmed), Hysi (typically short for Hussein), Gjika/Gjoka (short for Jacob, cf Jake), Marku (Mark), Kola/Kolla/Nikolla (Nicholas), Hasani (Hassan), Kristi/Kristo, Luka (Lucas), Brahimi (Abraham, from Turkish), Sinani, Thanasi (Athanasius), Halili (Halil), and Abazi (Abbas). Albanians of Muslim background often bear Christian last names (denoting former Christian origin), and those with Christian often bear Muslim last names (which many in Northern regions adopted thinking it would lead to better treatment from the Ottoman authorities), although the holders of Bektashi surnames are usually actually of Bektashi background
- Common names which originated as place names. May denote former residence, or, if the bearer has a Muslim patrilineal background, that their ancestors ruled the place. Common places used as surnames include Dibra, Laci, Shkodra, Prishtina, Delvina, Koroveshi and Permeti, as well as the famous Frasheri surname of the Frasheri family. Additionally common some names indicate regional origins: Gega/Gegaj (for one of Gheg origin), Tosku/Toskaj (signifying Tosk origin) and Chami (for Cham origin).
- Some common names are Northern Albanian clan names that double as place names such as Kelmendi and Shkreli. Other notable clan-origin names include Berisha, Krasniqi and Gashi. These sorts of names are very common in far Northern Albania and in Kosovo.
- Colors: of which Kuqi (red) and Bardhi (white) are the most commonly used as surnames.

Rank	Surname	Note (equivalent or else meaning)
*	Hoxha	a Muslim priest, Sunni or Bektashi, with its variant Hoxhaj
*	Prifti	a Christian priest, Catholic or Orthodox
*	Shehu	a Bektashi priest
*	Dervishi	Bektashi clergy
*	Bektashi	follower of Bektashism
*	Begu	
*	Gjoni or Gjonaj	John
*	Leka or Lekaj	Alex
*	Gjoni or Gjonaj	John
*	Murati	Murad
*	Mehmeti	Mehmed
*	Hysi	short for Hussein
*	Gjika/Gjoka	short for Jacob, cf Jake
*	Marku	Mark
*	Kola/Kolla/Nikolla	Nicholas
*	Hasani	Hassan
*	Kristi/Kristo	Christian
*	Luka	Lucas
*	Brahimi	Abraham, from Turkish
*	Sinani	
*	Thanasi	Athanasius
*	Halili	Halil
*	Abazi	Abbas
*	Dibra	from Dibër
*	Laçi	from Laç
*	Shkodra	from Shkodër
*	Prishtina	from Pristina
*	Delvina	from Delvinë
*	Koroveshi	
*	Përmeti	from Përmet
*	Frashëri	from Frashër
*	Gega/Gegaj	of Gheg origin or son of Gegë
*	Toska/Toskaj	signifying Tosk origin
*	Çami	Cham origin
*	Kelmendi	
*	Shkreli	
*	Berisha	
*	Krasniqi	
*	Gashi	
*	Kuqi	red
*	Bardhi	white

== Armenia ==
Source: Armenia's Voter List

Rank	Name	Armenian	Root name
1	Grigoryan	Գրիգորյան	Grigor (Gregory)
2	Harutyunyan	Հարությունյան	Harutyun ("resurrection")
3	Sargsyan	Սարգսյան	Sargis (Sergius)
4	Hovhannisyan	Հովհաննիսյան	Hovhannes (John)
5	Khachatryan	Խաչատրյան	Khachatur ("given by cross")
6	Hakobyan	Հակոբյան	Hakob (Jacob)
7	Petrosyan	Պետրոսյան	Petros (Peter)
8	Vardanyan	Վարդանյան	Vardan
9	Gevorgyan	Գեւորգյան	Gevorg (George)
10	Karapetyan	Կարապետյան	Karapet ("forerunner")
11	Mkrtchyan	Մկրտչյան	Mkrtich ("baptist")
12	Ghazaryan	Ղազարյան	Ghazar (Lazarus)
13	Manukyan	Մանուկյան	Manuk ("child")
14	Avetisyan	Ավետիսյան	Avetis/Avetik ("good news")
15	Poghosyan	Պողոսյան	Poghos (Paul)
16	Martirosyan	Մարտիրոսյան	Martiros ("martyr")
17	Sahakyan	Սահակյան	Sahak (Isaac)
18	Arakelyan	Առաքելյան	Arakel ("apostle")
19	Margaryan	Մարգարյան	Margar
20	Davtyan	Դավթյան	Davit (David)

== Austria ==
The forty-one most common surnames in Austria as published in 2006 are shown below beside the approximate percentage of the Austrian population sharing each surname.

Rank	Surname	Meaning	Approximate percentage
1	Gruber	one who lives in the valley	0.3991
2	Huber	land-owning farmer	0.3873
3	Bauer	farmer	0.3373
4	Wagner	Wainwright	0.3100
5	Müller	Miller	0.3012
6	Pichler	one who lives on or by a hill	0.2753
7	Steiner	one who dwells by the stone	0.2713
8	Moser	one who lives on moorland	0.2674
9	Mayer	a variant of Meier	0.2653
10	Hofer	probably for steward, property or horse maintenance, even blacksmith or related	0.2479
11	Leitner	one who lives at a hillside	0.2429
12	Berger	one who lives in the mountains	0.2383
13	Fuchs	Fox	0.2250
14	Eder	one who lives in a barren land	0.2144
15	Fischer	Fisher	0.2141
16	Schmid	blacksmith	0.2115
17	Winkler	a small trader	0.2015
18	Weber	weaver	0.1995
19	Schwarz	black	0.1961
20	Maier	a variant of Meier	0.1946
21	Schneider	tailor	0.1915
22	Reiter	horse rider or 'from the forest clearing' (-reuth)	0.1790
23	Mayr	a variant of Meier	0.1751
24	Schmidt	Smith	0.1740
25	Wimmer	Vintner	0.1628
26	Egger	Ploughman	0.1610
27	Brunner	one dwells by a water well	0.1602
28	Lang	long	0.1599
29	Baumgartner	Forrester (lit. 'tree gardener')	0.1586
30	Auer	'from the meadow'	0.1555
31	Binder	Cooper	0.1458
32	Lechner	variant of Lehner	0.1435
33	Wolf	Wolf	0.1395
34	Wallner	pos. 'forest dweller' Waldenare or a variant of Waldemar	0.1394
35	Aigner	allodial title	0.1386
36	Ebner	'from the plateau or flatland'	0.1342
37	Koller	'charcoal maker', variant of Kohler	0.1301
38	Lehner	a feudal land holder, see also Lehnsmann	0.1268
39	Haas	Hare	0.1261
40	Schuster	Cobbler	0.1168
41	Heilig	Holy	0.1161

== Azerbaijan ==
Rank	Surname	Romanization	Meaning
1	Məmmədov	Mammadov	son of Mammad
2	Əliyev	Aliyev	son of Ali
3	Hüseynov	Huseynov	son of Hüseyn
4	Həsənov	Hasanov	son of Hasan
5	Quliyev	Guliyev	son of Qulu
6	İsmayılov	Ismayilov	son of Ismayil
7	Əhmədov	Ahmadov	son of Ahmad
8	Abdullayev	Abdullayev	son of Abdulla
9	Abbasov	Abbasov	son of Abbas
10	Cəfərov	Jafarov	son of Jafar

== Belarus ==
Statistics available for the Belarusian capital of Minsk only:

Rank	Surname in Russian	Surname in Belarusian	Romanization	Population
1	Иванов	Іваноў	Ivanoŭ	7,000
2	Козлов	Казлоў	Kazloŭ	4,700
3	Ковалёв	Кавалёў	Kavalioŭ	4,300
4	Козловский	Казлоўскі	Kazloŭski	3,900
5	Новик	Новік	Novik	3,300

== Belgium ==
Belgium is a European nation composed of three main regions: Flemish Region (Flanders), Walloon Region (Wallonia), and Brussels-Capital Region. Flanders has a Dutch-language tradition, while Wallonia has a French-language tradition. The Brussels-Capital Region is a mix of both Dutch- and French-language influences, with a large influx of foreign names. These different linguistic backgrounds are reflected in differing frequencies of surnames, as shown in the table below. On 31 December 1997 there were 316 295 different surnames in Belgium (total population: 11,521,238).

- Note — the following table contains the ten most common surnames in each of the three federal regions as of 1 January 2021.

Rank				Surname	Population	Language	Meaning
National	Brussels	Flanders	Wallonia	Surname	Population	Language	Meaning
1	8	1	63	Peeters	31,079	Dutch	(son) of Peter [earlier form: Peeter]
2	6	2	52	Janssens	28,532	Dutch	(son) of John
3	20	3	66	Maes	24,594	Dutch	(son) of Thomas [earlier form: Thomaes]
4	13	4	88	Jacobs	19,077	Dutch	(son) of Jacob / James
5	17	6	66	Mertens	17,906	Dutch	(son) of Maarten [earlier form: Merten]
6	39	5	65	Willems	17,747	Dutch	(son) of Willem
7	79	7	102	Claes	15,798	Dutch	(son) of Nicolaas [earlier form: Niclaes]
8	33	9	124	Goossens	15,269	Dutch	(son) of Goos
9	68	8	181	Wouters	14,999	Dutch	(son) of Walter
10	57	10	259	De Smet	13,484	Dutch	the smith
13	7	237	1	Dubois	12,387	French	of the forest
17	21	262	2	Lambert	11232	French	bright land
21	22	162	4	Dupont	9,795	French	of the bridge
31	9	546	3	Martin	8,677	French	of or pertaining to the Roman god Mars
36	1	295	109	Diallo	8,159	Fula	unclear (one of four common Fula surnames)
37	15	1134	5	Simon	7,533	French	
40	25	797	7	Dumont	7,389	French	of the mountain
45	30	1283	6	Leclercq	7,117	French	the clerk
47	29	1119	8	Laurent	6,785	French	from Laurentum
50	35	944	10	Denis	6,636	French	Derived from Greek god of wine, Dionysus, but original etymology unclear
59	87	1638	9	Lejeune	6,246	French	the young one
119	2	564	381	Bah	4,516	Fula	unclear (one of four common Fula surnames)
234	3	1010	370	Barry	3,332	Fula	unclear (one of four common Fula surnames)
318	5	1114	268	Nguyen	2,736	Vietnamese	Sino-Vietnamese 阮 ('ruan')
451	4	1751	999	Sow	2,132	Fula	unclear (one of four common Fula surnames)
956	10	2482	2970	Benali	1,267	Arabic	son of Ali

== Bosnia and Herzegovina ==
=== Bosniaks ===
Rank	Surname	Meaning
1	Hodžić	Imam
2	Hadžić	Hajji
3	Čengić	Turkish for Genghis
4	Delić	son of a delija (brave)
5	Demirović	son of Demir
6	Kovačević	son of the blacksmith
7	Tahirović	son of Tahir
8	Ferhatović	son of Ferhat
9	Muratović	son of Murat
10	Ibrahimović	son of Ibrahim
11	Hasanović	son of Hasan
12	Mehmedović	son of Mehmed
13	Salihović	son of Salih
14	Terzić	tailor
15	Ademović	son of Adem
16	Adilović	son of Adil
17	Delemović	son of Delem
18	Zukić	
19	Krličević	
20	Suljić	son of Suliman (Salomon)
21	Ahmetović	son of Ahmad

=== Serbs ===
The following names are the most common names for Serbs from Bosnia and Herzegovina.

Rank	Surname	Meaning
1	Kovačević	son of the blacksmith
2	Subotić	of Saturday
3	Savić	son of Sava
4	Popović	son of the priest
5	Jovanović	son of Jovan
6	Petrović	son of Petar
7	Đurić	son of Đura
8	Babić	of grandmother, old woman
9	Lukić	son of Luka
10	Knežević	son of the prince
11	Marković	son of Marko
12	Ilić	son of Ilija
13	Đukić	son of Đuka
14	Vuković	son of Vuk/ of wolf
15	Vujić	son of Vujo
16	Simić	son of Simo
17	Radić	son of Rade
18	Nikolić	son of Nikola
19	Marić	son of Mara
20	Mitrović	son of Mitar
21	Tomić	son of Toma/Tomo
22	Božić	son of Božo
23	Golubović	of dove/pigeon
24	Mirković	son of Mirko

== Bulgaria ==
Feminized names included (m. Dimitrov – f. Dimitrova). Figures are from 2018 and provided by the Bulgarian National Statistics Institute.

Statistic of the Bulgarian surnames
Rank	Surname	Transliteration	Number of males	Number of females
1	Иванов/Иванова	Ivanov/Ivanova	136,125	141,183
2	Георгиев/Георгиева	Georgiev/Georgieva	105,209	108,302
3	Димитров/Димитрова	Dimitrov/Dimitrova	101,020	104,754
4	Петров/Петрова	Petrov/Petrova	67,804	71,082
5	Николов/Николова	Nikolov/Nikolova	58,189	61,339
6	Христов/Христова	Hristov/Hristova	53,818	57,034
7	Стоянов/Стоянова	Stoyanov/Stoyanova	53,088	56,387
8	Тодоров/Тодорова	Todorov/Todorova	52,139	54,275
9	Илиев/Илиева	Iliev/Ilieva	44,732	46,343
10	Ангелов/Ангелова	Angelov/Angelova	43,985	45,629

== Croatia ==
Rank	Frequency	Surname	Surname derivation
1	21,618	Horvat	ethnic name for a Croat
2	15,160	Kovačević	patronymic, from kovač 'blacksmith'
3	12,840	Babić	matronymic, or nickname, from baba '(old) woman', 'grandmother'
4	11,555	Marić	1. matronymic, from Mara – short variant of Marija 'Mary'; 2. patronymic, from Maro – short variant of Marije 'Marius' or Marijan 'Marianus'
5	11,163	Jurić	patronymic, from Jure or Juro – regional variants of Juraj 'George'
6	10,794	Novak	1. a newcomer, from novy 'new'; 2. topographic name, for peasant who settled on newly cleared land
7	10,546	Kovačić	patronymic, from kovač 'blacksmith'
8	10,334	Knežević	from knez 'prince' or 'duke'
9	10,191	Vuković	patronymic, from Vuk – ancient Slavic name meaning 'wolf'
10	9,854	Marković	patronymic, from Marko 'Marcus'
11	9,614	Petrović	patronymic, from Petar and Peter
12	9,960	Matić	patronymic, from Matija 'Matthias' or Matej 'Matthew'; or possibly from their short variants Mate or Mato
13	9,464	Tomić	patronymic, from Tomo or Toma 'Thomas'
14	8,601	Pavlović	patronymic, from Pavao, Pavle, and Pavel 'Paul'
15	8,542	Kovač	occupational name, from kovač 'blacksmith'
16	8,258	Božić	patronymic, from Božo (from bozhy meaning 'of God')
17	8,152	Blažević	patronymic, from Blaž lat. Blasius 'Blaise'
18	8,010	Grgić	patronymic, from Grga or Grgo – short variants of Grgur 'Gregory'
19	7,538	Pavić	patronymic, from Pavo – short or regional variant of Pavao 'Paul'
20	7,406	Radić	patronymic, from Rade (Slavic name meaning 'happy')
21	7,351	Perić	patronymic, from Pero (Peter)
22	7,321	Filipović	patronymic, from Filip
23	7,184	Šarić	
24	7,131	Lovrić	patronymic, from Lovro (Lawrence)
25	6,986	Vidović	patronymic, from Vid (Vitus)
26	6,903	Perković	patronymic, from Perko (Peter)
27	6,797	Popović	patronymic, from Pop (priest)
28	6,760	Bošnjak	regional name, person from Bosnia
29	6,653	Jukić	patronymic, from Juko or Juka – regional variants of Juraj 'George'
30	6,417	Barišić	patronymic, from Bariša – short or regional variant of Bartol, Bartul, Bartolomej 'Bartholomew'

== Czech Republic ==
Feminized names are included (m. Novák/f. Nováková). Figures are from 2009 and provided by the Czech Ministry of the Interior.

Statistic of the Czech Republic surnames
Rank	Surname	Meaning	Number of men	Number of women
1	Novák/Nováková	new man/woman	34,168	35,558
2	Svoboda/Svobodová	freeholder	25,292	26,569
3	Novotný/Novotná	newman	24,320	25,328
4	Dvořák/Dvořáková	grange owner	22,299	23,445
5	Černý/Černá	dark or black	17,813	18,504
6	Procházka/Procházková	walker	16,074	16,817
7	Kučera/Kučerová	curly man/woman	15,187	15,689
8	Veselý/Veselá	cheerful, merry man/woman	12,882	13,494
9	Horák/Horáková	highlander	12,165	12,796
10	Němec/Němcová	German	11,192	11,563

== Denmark ==
Nineteen of the twenty most common Danish surnames as of 1 January 2022 are patronymic ending in Norse -sen ('son of'), the only exception being Møller (Miller).

Rank	Surname	Meaning (*variant/s also listed)	#
1	Nielsen	son of Niels	236,397
2	Jensen	son of Jens	233,713
3	Hansen	son of Hans	197,548
4	Pedersen	son of Peder*	150,161
5	Andersen	son of Anders	149,643
6	Christensen	son of Christen*	111,816
7	Larsen	son of Lars	107,721
8	Sørensen	son of Søren	102,848
9	Rasmussen	son of Rasmus	88,351
10	Jørgensen	son of Jørgen	82,285
11	Petersen	son of Peter*	72,757
12	Madsen	son of Mads	60,676
13	Kristensen	son of Kristen*	57,758
14	Olsen	son of Ole	44,629
15	Thomsen	son of Thomas	38,244
16	Christiansen	son of Christian*	35,143
17	Poulsen	son of Poul	30,545
18	Johansen	son of Johan/Johannes*	29,866
19	Møller	Miller	29,481
20	Mortensen	son of Morten	28,124

=== Faroe Islands ===
The 20 most common surnames in the Faroe Islands as published in 2017 are shown below beside the number of people of the Faroese population sharing each surname.

Rank	Surname	Number of individuals
1	Joensen	2,372
2	Hansen	2,181
3	Jacobsen	2,051
4	Olsen	1,670
5	Petersen	1,298
6	Poulsen	1,257
7	Johannesen	973
8	Thomsen	719
9	Nielsen	647
10	Rasmussen	539
11	Djurhuus	537
12	Johansen	535
13	Simonsen	526
14	Danielsen	524
15	Jensen	492
16	Mortensen	471
17	Højgaard	462
18	Mikkelsen	432
19	Sørensen	420
20	Dam	418

== Estonia ==
Data from 2008.

Names of Estonian origin:

Rank	#	Surname	Meaning
1	5,241	Tamm	oak
2	4,352	Saar	island/ash (tree)
3	3,624	Sepp	smith
4	3,613	Mägi	hill, mountain
5	2,847	Kask	birch
6	2,728	Kukk	rooster
7	2,265	Rebane	fox
8	2,165	Ilves	lynx
9	1,933	Pärn	linden tree
10	1,882	Koppel	paddock

Names of Russian origin:

Rank	#	Surname
1	6,789	Ivanov
2	3,402	Smirnov
3	3,153	Vassiljev
4	2,932	Petrov
5	2,339	Kuznetsov
6	2,265	Karpin
7	1,968	Mihhailov
8	1,927	Pavlov
9	1,909	Semjonov
10	1,862	Andrejev
11	1,845	Aleksejev

== Finland ==
Rank	Surname	Meaning	Population	Percentage
1	Korhonen	Uncertain meaning; see article	23,312	0.425
2	Virtanen	virta 'stream'	23,020	0.420
3	Mäkinen	mäki 'hill'	21,014	0.383
4	Nieminen	niemi 'cape'	20,969	0.382
5	Mäkelä	hill place	19,538	0.356
6	Hämäläinen	Tavastian, comes from Tavastia	19,129	0.349
7	Laine	wave	18,752	0.342
8	Heikkinen	first name Heikki, "Henry", "Henrik"	17,926	0.327
9	Koskinen	koski 'rapids'	17,737	0.324
10	Järvinen	järvi 'lake'	16,802	0.306
11	Lehtonen	lehto 'grove'	16,649	0.304
12	Lehtinen	lehti 'leaf'	15,602	0.285
13	Saarinen	saari 'island'	15,295	0.279
14	Salminen	salmi 'strait'	15,087	0.275
15	Heinonen	heinä 'hay'	14,957	0.273
16	Niemi	peninsula	14,951	0.273
17	Heikkilä	first name Heikki, "Henry", "Henrik"	14,558	0.266
18	Kinnunen	from the Swedish skinnare 'skinner'	14,319	0.261
19	Salonen	salo 'backwoods'	14,270	0.260
20	Turunen	turku 'market, selling place', nowadays only the name of a city (Turku)	13,802	0.252
21	Salo	backwoods	13,487	0.246
22	Laitinen	laita 'side, margin'	13,085	0.239
23	Tuominen	tuomi 'bird cherry'	12,852	0.234
24	Rantanen	ranta 'shore, beach'	12,834	0.234
25	Karjalainen	Karelian, comes from Karelia	12,830	0.234
26	Jokinen	joki 'river'	12,514	0.228
27	Mattila	first name Matti, "Matt", "Mathew", -la, place suffix	12,330	0.225
28	Savolainen	Savonian, comes from Savonia	11,592	0.211
29	Lahtinen	lahti 'bay'	11,470	0.209
30	Ahonen	aho 'meadow'	11,238	0.205

Most of the names on this list are typical examples of surnames that were adopted when modern surnames were introduced in the late 19th and early 20th centuries. In the romantic spirit, they refer to natural features: virta 'river', koski 'rapids', mäki 'hill', järvi 'lake', saari 'island' — often with the suffix -nen added after the model of older, mainly eastern Finnish surnames such as Korhonen and Heikkinen. Hämäläinen literally means 'an inhabitant of Häme'. The suffix -nen is an adjective ending.

=== Most common Swedish surnames in Finland ===
Rank	Surname	Population	Percentage
1	Johansson	8,679	0.158
2	Nyman	7,552	0.138
3	Lindholm	7,382	0.135
4	Karlsson	7,096	0.129
5	Andersson	6,403	0.117

== France ==
Between the 11th and 14th centuries, when family names became mandatory and started to be fixed, it happened to shorten patronyms into family names, and was customary to surname orphans according the name of the saint of the current day in the calendar. Because Saint-Martin was the Saint of charity, he was also more often used to name children.

Rank	#	Surname	Meaning
1	235,846	Martin	given name: latin “of Mars”, god of war
2	105,132	Bernard	given name: frankish “bear-y”
3	95,998	Dubois	woods dweller
4	95,387	Thomas	given name: hebrew/aramaic “twin”
5	91,393	Robert	given name: frankish “shining glory”
6	90,689	Richard	given name: frankish “ruler” + “brave”
7	88,318	Petit	short
8	84,252	Durand	strong, resilient, literally: “lasting”
9	78,868	Leroy	the king
10	78,177	Moreau	brown; like the Moors
11	76,655	Simon	given name: hebrew “listening”
12	75,307	Laurent	given name: latin for the laurel tree
13	74,564	Lefebvre	blacksmith
14	74,318	Michel	given name, hebrew “who is like god”
15	68,720	Garcia	of Spanish origin, maybe Basque ”young heart”
16	61,762	David	given name, hebrew “beloved”
17	59,817	Bertrand	given name, frankish ”crow”
18	59,440	Roux	redhead
19	57,351	Vincent	given name, latin ”winning”
20	57,047	Fournier	baker
21	56,760	Morel	brown; like the Moors
22	55,642	Girard	given name: germanic ”spear” + “hard”
23	55,228	André	given name, greek “man”
24	53,670	Lefèvre	blacksmith
25	53,622	Mercier	textile trader
26	53,405	Dupont	bridge dweller
27	51,543	Lambert	given name, normand ”land” + “bright”
28	50,999	Bonnet	good-mannered
29	50,612	François	given name: germanic “frank-ish” / “french-ish”
30	49,762	Martinez	son of Martín, of Spanish origin: see beginning of table for cognate

== Georgia ==
Rank	Surname	Romanization	Total Number (2018)
1	ბერიძე	Beridze	29,173
2	მამედოვი	Mamedovi	28,358
3	ალიევი	Alievi	19,327
4	კაპანაძე	Kapanadze	19,257
5	გელაშვილი	Gelashvili	18,310
6	მაისურაძე	Maisuradze	16,198
7	გიორგაძე	Giorgadze	14,162
8	ლომიძე	Lomidze	13,062
9	წიკლაური	Tsiklauri	13,019
10	ბოლქვაძე	Bolkvadze	12,824

== Germany ==
Rank	Surname	Meaning	Percentage
1	Müller	miller	0.95
2	Schmidt	smith	0.69
3	Schneider	tailor	0.40
4	Fischer	fisher	0.35
5	Meyer	'mayor' (originally estate administrator, later farmer)	0.33
6	Weber	weaver	0.30
7	Wagner	wainwright (worn-down form of wagoner)	0.27
8	Schulz	Schultheiß (village headman or constable / sheriff)	0.27
9	Becker	baker	0.27
10	Hoffmann	'man of the court/farm' (courtier/steward, later farmer)	0.26

== Greece ==
The majority of Greek names are patronymic. There are also several names derived from professions (Samaras, Σαμαράς 'saddle maker', Papoutsis, Παπουτσής 'shoe maker'), area of (former) residence (Kritikos, Κρητικός 'from Crete', Aivaliotis, Αϊβαλιώτης 'from Ayvalık'), nicknames relating to physical or other characteristics (Kontos, Κοντός 'short', Mytaras, Μυταράς 'large-nosed', Koufos, Κουφός 'deaf') and more.

The patronymic suffix varies between dialects; thus Giannidis, Giannakos, Giannatos, Giannopoulos, Giannelis, Giannioglou all mean 'son of Giannis'.

Rank	Surname	Transliteration	Meaning
*	Σαμαράς	Samaras	saddle maker
*	Παπουτσής	Papoutsis	shoe maker
*	Κρητικός	Kritikos	from Crete
*	Αϊβαλιώτης	Aivaliotis	from Ayvalık
*	Κοντός	Kontos	short
*	Μυταράς	Mytaras	large-nosed
*	Κουφός	Koufos	deaf

== Hungary ==
As of 2026, 1,971,747 individuals (20.37% of the population) bear the most common 20 names, and 3,159,120 individuals (32.64%) bearing the top 100 names. 25 most common surnames in Hungary as of January 2026:

Rank	Population	Surname	Meaning
1	218,645	Nagy	big/large/great
2	201,550	Kovács	smith (occupational name)
3	196,724	Tóth	Slav in general (also Slovak, Slovenian)
4	194,536	Szabó	tailor (occupational name)
5	192,642	Horváth	Croat
6	129,207	Varga	leatherworker (occupational name)
7	121,094	Kiss	little/small
8	99,975	Molnár	miller (occupational name)
9	84,282	Németh	German
10	80,909	Balogh	left-handed
11	80,551	Farkas	wolf
12	52,005	Lakatos	locksmith (occupational name)
13	48,977	Papp	priest (occupational name)
14	47,368	Takács	weaver (occupational name)
15	46,940	Juhász	shepherd (occupational name)
16	37,873	Oláh	Vlach (Romanian)
17	36,583	Mészáros	butcher (occupational name)
18	35,464	Simon	Simon
19	34,755	Rácz	Serb (South Slavic)
20	31,667	Fekete	black
21	30,735	Szilágyi	hailing from Szilágyság
22	24,820	Török	Turkish
23	24,786	Fehér	white
24	24,582	Balázs	Blaise
25	23,663	Gál	Gallic (uncertain)

== Iceland ==
While the vast majority of Icelanders do not use regular surnames but rather patronyms or matronyms, around 4% of Icelanders have proper surnames. See also Icelandic names.

The 20 most common surnames in Iceland as published in 2017 are shown below beside the number of people of the Icelandic population sharing each surname.

Rank	Surname	Number of individuals
1	Blöndal	324
2	Thorarensen	293
3	Hansen	282
4	Olsen	224
5	Andersen	206
5	Petersen	206
7	Möller	198
8	Nielsen	180
9	Waage	171
10	Bergmann	158
11	Briem	156
12	Thorlacius	155
13	Jensen	146
14	Hjaltalín	137
15	Scheving	135
16	Petersen	126
17	Kvaran	123
17	Fjeldsted	123
19	Norðdahl	113
20	Berndsen	105

== Ireland ==
The prevalence of some of these names is the result of more than one distinct Irish language names being represented by the same anglicised version.

#	Surname	Modern Irish	Original Irish	Meaning
1	Murphy	Ó Murchú/Mac Murchú	Ó Murchadha; Mac Murchaidh	Son or Descendant of Murchadh (a personal name meaning 'sea hound/warrior')
2	Kelly	Mac ceallaigh/Ó Ceallaigh		son or Descendant of Ceallach ('strife')
3	(O')Sullivan	Ó Súilleabháin		Descendant of Súilleabhán ('dark-eyed one', 'one-eyed' or 'hawk-eyed')
4	Walsh	Breathnach	Breatnach	'Breton', 'Welshman'
5	Smith	Mac Gabhann		Son of a smith
6	O'Brien	Ó Briain		Descendant of Brian
7	(O')Byrne	Ó Broin		Descendant of Bran
8	(O')Ryan	Ó Riain	Ó Riain; Ó Maoilriain; Ó Ruaidhín	Descendant of Rian (possibly meaning 'king'); Descendant of Maoilriaghan ('bald king'); Descendant of Ruaidhín ('little red-haired one')
9	O'Connor	Ó Conchúir	Ó Conchobhair	Descendant of Conchobhar ('hound/chief assistance')
10	O'Neill	Ó Néill		Descendant of Niall (possibly meaning 'cloud', 'passionate' or 'champion')
11	(O')Reilly	Ó Raghallaigh		Descendant of Raghallach
12	Doyle	Ó Dubhghaill		Descendant of Dubhghall ('dark-haired foreigner')
13	McCarthy	Mac Cárthaigh		Son of Cárthach ('loving')
14	(O')Gallagher	Ó Gallchóir	Ó Gallchobhair	Descendant of Gallchobhar ('foreign assistance')
15	(O')Doherty	Ó Dochartaigh		Descendant of Dochartach ('hurtful')
16	Kennedy	Ó Cinnéide	Ó Ceannéidigh or Mac Ceannéidigh	Descendant of Cinnéide ('adorned head')
17	Lynch	Ó Loingsigh		Descendant of Loingseach ('longboat')
18	Murray	Ó Muireadhaigh	Mac Muireadhaigh; Mac Giolla Mhuire	Descendant of Muireadhach ('chieftain'); Descendant of a servant of Mary
19	(O')Quinn	Ó Cuinn/Coinne/Mac Cuinn		Descendant of Conn ('hound/chief')
20	(O')Moore	Ó Mórdha		Descendant of Mórdha ('majestic')

Names starting with O' and Mac/Mc were originally patronymic. Of the names above, with the exception of Smith and Walsh, all originally began with O' or Mac/Mc but many have lost this prefix over time. Mac/Mc, meaning Son, and Ó, meaning Little (or Descendant), are used by sons born into the family. In the case of a daughter being born into the family she would use Ní/Nic, for example Ó Muireadhaigh becomes Ní Mhuireadhaigh. A woman who marries into the family and takes her husband's name uses Uí/Mic- e.g. Uí Mhuireadhaigh.

== Italy ==
From Mappa dei Cognomi website.

Rank	Surname	Frequency (estimate of families bearing the name)	Meaning
1	Rossi	60,487	red (Northern and Central Italy)
2	Russo	42,877	red (Southern Italy)
3	Ferrari	33,707	blacksmith
4	Esposito	31,980	exposed (abandoned child; orphan)
5	Bianchi	25,121	white
6	Romano	24,062	Roman
7	Colombo	23,484	dove (abandoned child)
8	Bruno	20,509	brown
9	Ricci	19,879	curly
10	Greco	18,225	Greek
11	Marino	17,939	marine, seaman
12	Gallo	17,622	French
13	De Luca	17,438	son of Luke
14	Conti	17,173	Count
15	Costa	16,875	coast
16	Mancini	16,784	left-handed
17	Giordano	16,636	Jordan
18	Rizzo	16,394	curly
19	Lombardi	15,220	Lombard
20	Barbieri	14,304	barber
21	Moretti	14,255	brown (diminutive form)
22	Fontana	14,214	fountain
23	Caruso	13,756	boy, apprentice
24	Mariani	13,652	Marian
25	Ferrara	13,236	blacksmith
26	Santoro	13,141	Sanctorum omnium (all saints' day)
27	Rinaldi	12,861	Reynold
28	Leone	12,661	lion
29	D'Angelo	12,620	son of Angelo
30	Longo	12,273	long
31	Galli	12,240	French
32	Martini	12,090	Martin
33	Martinelli	11,819	Martin (diminutive)
34	Serra	11,484	saw (carpenter)
35	Conte	11,347	Count
36	Vitale	11,266	Vitale (given name)
37	De Santis	11,208	of the saints
38	Marchetti	11,115	little Marco
39	Messina	11,113	
40	Gentile	11,019	gentle
41	Villa	11,011	dwelling
42	Marini	10,875	seafarer
43	Lombardo	10,803	Lombard
44	Coppola	10,783	beret
45	Ferri	10,679	iron's
46	Parisi	10,675	from Paros
47	De Angelis	10,509	of the angels
48	Bianco	10,467	white
49	Amato	10,449	beloved
50	Fabbri	10,330	blacksmith
51	Gatti	10,303	cats
52	Sala	10,283	Sala
53	Morelli	10,181	
54	Grasso	10,076	fat
55	Pellegrini	10,027	pilgrims
56	Ferraro	10,020	blacksmith
57	Monti	10,007	mountains
58	Palumbo	9,775	pigeon
59	Grassi	9,749	fat
60	Testa	9,728	head
61	Valentini	9,435	valiant, bold
62	Carbone	9,293	coal
63	Benedetti	9,258	blessed/son of Benedict
64	Silvestri	9,250	son of Sylvester
65	Farina	9,168	flour (occupational surname)
66	D'Amico	9,125	son of Amico
67	Martino	8,877	Martin
68	Bernardi	8,849	Barnard
69	Caputo	8,826	big headed
70	Mazza	8,756	toolmaker, smith
71	Sanna	8,740	Fang (Sardinian)
72	Fiore	8,734	flower
73	De Rosa	8,727	from the rose
74	Pellegrino	8,678	pilgrim
75	Giuliani	8,647	son of Julian
76	Rizzi	8,594	curly
77	Di Stefano	8,521	son of Steven
78	Cattaneo	8,479	captain
79	Rossetti	8,454	red one
80	Orlando	8,423	Roland
81	Basile	8,368	Basil
82	Neri	8,358	counsel-army, protection-army
83	Barone	8,344	Baron
84	Palmieri	8,297	Palmer
85	Riva	8,203	shore
86	Romeo	8,074	Roman
87	Franco	8,047	Frank
88	Sorrentino	8,017	from Sorrento
89	Pagano	8,007	pagan
90	D'Agostino	7,904	Son of Augustin
91	Piras	7,889	pear tree (Sardinia)
92	Ruggiero	7,812	Rodger
93	Montanari	7,795	highlander
94	Battaglia	7,713	battle
95	Bellini	7,690	little beautiful one
96	Castelli	7,671	castles
97	Guerra	7,572	war
98	Poli	7,538	
99	Valente	7,493	valiant, bold
100	Ferretti	7,489	smith

== Kazakhstan ==
Provided here is a list of the 33 most common surnames in Kazakhstan according to the Ministry of Justice of Kazakhstan as of 2014.

- List of the most popular surnames of Kazakhs of Kazakhstan

Rank	Cyrillic script	Latin script	Language (and meaning)	Occurrence
1	Ахметов	Ahmetov	Kazakh, "son of Ahmet"	73,627
2	Омаров	Omarov	Kazakh, "son of Omar"	45,123
3	Ким	Kim	Korean	42,274
4	Оспанов	Ospanov	Kazakh	41,068
5	Иванов	Ivanov	Russian, "son of Ivan"	39,296
6	Алиев	Aliev	Kazakh, "son of Ali"	36,084
7	Сулейменов	Suleimenov	Kazakh, "son of Suleimen"	33,940
8	Искаков	Iskakov	Kazakh	31,988
9	Абдрахманов	Abdrahmanov	Kazakh, "son of Abdrahman"	29,091
10	Ибрагимов	Ibragimov	Kazakh, "son of Ibragim"	28,755
11	Калиев	Kaliev	Kazakh, "son of Ali"	28,219
12	Садыков	Sadykov	Kazakh, "son of Sadyk	27,810
13	Ибраев	Ibraev	Kazakh, "son of Ibragim"	26,531
14	Кузнецов	Kuznetsov	Russian, "son of a blacksmith"	25,990
15	Попов	Popov	Russian, "son of a priest"	24,956
16	Смагулов	Smagulov	Kazakh	24,005
17	Абдуллаев	Abdullaev	Kazakh, "son of Abdulla"	23,729
18	Исаев	Isaev	Kazakh, "son of Isa"	22,910
19	Султанов	Sultanov	Kazakh, "son of Sultan"	22,808
22	Юсупов	Iusupov	Uzbek, "son of Yusup"	22,763
21	Исмаилов	Ismailov	Kazakh, "son of Ismail"	21,392
22	Нургалиев	Nurgaliev	Kazakh, "son of Nurgali"	21,133
23	Каримов	Karimov	Kazakh, "son of Karim"	20,575
24	Серік/Серик	Serik	Kazakh	19 550
25	Ли	Li	Korean	17,049
26	Цой	Tsoi	Korean	12,088
27	Амангельды	Amangeldy	Kazakh	15,125
28	Болат	Bolat	Kazakh	11,234
29	Бондаренко	Bondarenko	Ukrainian	10,648
30	Марат	Marat	Kazakh, "Murad"	10,417
31	Серікбай/Серикбай	Serıkbay/Serikbay	Kazakh	10,193
32	Мурат	Murat	Kazakh, "Murad"	10,106
33	Кусаинов	Kusainov	Kazakh, "son of Kusain"	10,103

== Kosovo ==
These statistics are based on the Kosovo Agency of Statistics report on names and surnames in Kosovo, which took place in 2017.

Rank	Surname	Number of individuals
1	Krasniqi	58,199
2	Gashi	57,396
3	Berisha	43,727
4	Morina	27,222
5	Shala	25,585
6	Bytyqi	18,840
7	Hasani	13,187
8	Kastrati	13,015
9	Kryeziu	12,882
10	Hoti	12,709

== Latvia ==
Latvian surnames

Rank	Surname/Feminized form	Meaning
1	Bērziņš/Bērziņa	birch (diminutive)
2	Kalniņš/Kalniņa	hill (diminutive)
3	Ozoliņš/Ozoliņa	oak (diminutive)
4	Jansons/Jansone	son of Jānis (Germanized)
5	Ozols/Ozola	oak
6	Liepiņš/Liepiņa	linden (diminutive)
7	Krūmiņš/Krūmiņa	bush (diminutive)
8	Balodis/Balode	pigeon
9	Eglītis/Eglīte	fir (diminutive)
10	Zariņš/Zariņa	branch (diminutive)
11	Pētersons/Pētersone	son of Pēteris (Germanized)
12	Vītols/Vītola	willow
13	Kļaviņš/Kļaviņa	maple (diminutive)
14	Kārkliņš/Kārkliņa	willow (diminutive form of Kārkls)
15	Vanags/Vanaga	hawk

== Lithuania ==
Lithuania, 2015
Rank	Male	Female (Note: The Lithuanian language has different endings for surnames for men and women. The ending of a woman's surname indicates whether she is married or not. Last names of married women end in -ienė while those of unmarried girls end in -ytė, -iūtė, -utė, -aitė.)	Meaning
1	Kazlauskas	Kazlauskienė	equivalent of Polish Kozłowski from kozioł 'billy goat', certainly from before Christianity.
2	Jankauskas	Jankauskienė	from Jankowski from Janek from Jan in Polish, the apostle John.
3	Petrauskas	Petrauskienė	of Peter or Piotr in Polish
4	Stankevičius	Stankevičienė	from Polish Stanisławski from Stanisław 'state of glory'
5	Vasiliauskas	Vasiliauskienė	of Vasil from Greek Basileus 'royal, kingly' reference to Christ, the king of heaven.
6	Butkus	Butkienė	from Polish Budzisław 'awakening glory'
7	Žukauskas	Žukauskienė	from Polish Żukowski from żuk 'beetle', also taken from before Christianity.
8	Paulauskas	Paulauskienė	of the apostle Paul
9	Urbonas	Urbonienė	from Latin urbanus 'from the city' meaning 'connected to Rome and Christianity'.
10	Kavaliauskas	Kavaliauskienė	from Polish Kowalski from Kowal 'blacksmith'

== Luxembourg ==
Out of 236,000 entries in the EDITUS phone book:

Rank	#	Surname	Meaning
1	1929	Schmit	smith
2	1473	Muller	miller
3	1380	Weber	weaver
4	1335	Hoffmann	farmer
5	1300	Wagner	wain maker
6	1027	Thill	
7	939	Schmitz	smith's
8	793	Schroeder	
9	712	Reuter	
10	706	Klein	little
11	674	Becker	baker
12	660	Kieffer	pine wood
13	650	Kremer	chapman
14	610	Faber	Latin faber 'smith'
15	556	Meyer	
16	550	Schneider	tailor
17	543	Weiss	white
18	538	Schiltz	shield's
19	537	Simon	Simon
20	533	Welter	Walter
21	504	Hansen	little John
22	496	Majerus	
23	467	Ries	Reeds
24	459	Meyers	
25	451	Kayser	emperor
26	441	Steffen	Steven
27	438	Krier	
28	421	Braun	brown
29	411	Wagener	wain maker
30	405	Diederich	from first name D.

== Malta ==
Rank	%	#	Surname
1	3.3	13,610	Borg
2	3.1	13,090	Camilleri
3	2.9	12,192	Vella
4	2.9	11,953	Farrugia
5	2.3	9,769	Zammit
6	2.1	8,767	Galea
7	2.1	8,677	Micallef
8	2.0	8,178	Grech
9	1.8	7,680	Attard
10	1.8	7,316	Spiteri

== Moldova ==
Rank	Surname	Meaning	Total number of families
1	Rusu	from Rus	23,028
2	Ceban	shepherd	20,929
3	Ciobanu	shepherd	17,167
4	Țurcan	(archaic) farmer	16,984
5	Cebotari	shoemaker	15,464
6	Sîrbu	Serb	14,171
7	Lungu	long, tall	14,090
8	Munteanu	from Muntenia (Wallachia)/from mountains	13,904
9	Rotari	from roată 'wheel'	13,511
10	Popa	priest	12,923
11	Ursu	bear	11,456
12	Guțu	dove	11,433
13	Roșca	red-haired, ginger	11,194
14	Melnic	miller	10,632
15	Cojocari	coat crafter	10,526

== Montenegro ==
Rank	Surname	Meaning
1	Popović	son of a priest
2	Marković	son of Marko
3	Vujović	son of Vujo
4	Radović	son of Rado
5	Ivanović	son of Ivan
6	Radulović	son of Radul or Radule
7	Jovanović	son of Jovan
8	Perović	son of Pero
9	Vuković	Son of Vuk (Vuk means wolf)
10	Kovačević	Son of a blacksmith

== Netherlands ==
The most recent complete count of surnames in the Netherlands is based on the September 2007 county registrations.

Rank	Surname	Number in 2007	Percent	Number in 1947	English equivalent (or meaning)
1	De Jong	86,534	0.53%	55,256	the young
2	Jansen	75,699	0.46%	49,213	Johnson
3	De Vries	73,157	0.45%	49,298	the Frisian
4	Van den Berg *	60,130	0.37%	37,678	of (from) the mountain
5	Van Dijk, Van Dyk	57,944	0.35%	36,578	of (from) dike
6	Bakker	56,864	0.35%	37,483	Baker
7	Janssen	55,394	0.34%	32,824	Johnson
8	Visser	50,929	0.31%	34,721	Fisher
9	Smit	43,493	0.27%	29,783	Smith
10	Meijer, Meyer	41,497	0.25%	28,256	Mayor (local official such as bailiff or steward)
11	De Boer	39,576	0.24%	25,662	the farmer
12	Mulder	37,250	0.23%	24,665	Miller
13	De Groot	37,221	0.23%	24,724	The Great
14	Bos	36,478	0.22%	23,790	Bush (literally); woods/forest
15	Vos	31,154	0.19%	19,461	Fox
16	Peters	30,864	0.19%	18,583	Peters
17	Hendriks	30,199	0.18%	18,538	Henderson
18	Van Leeuwen	28,774	0.18%	17,754	of (from) Leeuwen; likely also from other places
19	Dekker	28,682	0.17%	18,782	Thatcher
20	Brouwer	26,224	0.16%	17,468	Brewer
21	De Wit	24,904	0.15%	15,156	the white
22	Dijkstra	24,175	0.15%	15,647	a (from the) dike
23	Smits	23,816	0.15%	15,151	Smith
24	De Graaf	21,699	0.13%	13,718	The reeve (local official, e.g. bailiff); literally: the count
25	Van der Meer	21,354	0.13%	13,011	of (from) the lake

When closely related names are combined, the top 15 are:

Rank	Surname	Number of people
1	Jansen, Janssen, Janse	135,003
2	de Jong, de Jonge, de Jongh, Jong	108,240
3	Smit, Smits, Smid, de Smit, Smet, Smith	76,604
4	de Vries, Vries, de Vriese	74,058
5	vd Berg, vd Bergh, vd Berge, vd Bergen*	69,080
6	Visser, Visscher, Vissers, de Visser	68,952
7	van Dijk, van Dyk, Dijk, van Dijck	64,070
8	Bakker, Bekker, de Bakker, Backer	62,183
9	de Boer, Boer, den Boer, van de Boer	57,072
10	Mulder, Muller, Müller, Mulders, de Mulder	52,394
11	Peters, Peeters, Pieters, Peterse, Peter	52,389
12	vd Veen, vd Ven, van Veen, van 't Veen *	49,935
13	Bos, Bosch, de Bos	47,995
14	Meijer, Meyer, Meijers	47,761
15	de Groot, Groot, de Groote	47,511

* "vd" is an abbreviation which stands for all variants of "van de", "van den", or "van der"

Source: Nederlands Repertorium van Familienamen, Meertens-Instituut, 1963–2009. Data can be viewed in the Corpus of Family Names in the Netherlands See specifically De top 100 van de familienamen in Nederland (Dutch)

Names ending in -stra or -ma are usually of Frisian origin. For example, Terpstra, Bijlsma, Halsema.

Names ending in -ink or -ing are usually of Low Saxon origin. For example, Hiddink, Meyerink, Mentink.

== North Macedonia ==
The most recent complete count of surnames is based on end of year 2022 State Statistical Office.

Rank	#	Surname	Versions	Meaning
1	31,670	Stojanovski	Stojanoski, Stojanov, Stojanovska, Stojanoska, Stojanova, Stojanović	patronymic; descendant of Stojan (Stoyan)
2	27,285	Jovanovski	Jovanoski, Jovanov, Jovanovska, Jovanoska, Jovanova, Jovanović	patronymic; descendant of Jovan (John in Macedonian)
3	26,918	Nikolovski	Nikoloski, Nikolov, Nikolovska, Nikoloska, Nikolova, Nikolić	patronymic; descendant of Nikola
4	25,101	Ristovski	Ristoski, Ristov, Ristevski, Risteski, Ristovska, Ristoska, Ristova, Ristevska, Risteska, Ristić	patronymic; descendant of Risto or Riste (Christ in Macedonian)
5	18,307	Petrovski	Petroski, Petrov, Petrevski, Petreski, Petrovska, Petroska, Petrova, Petrevska, Petrova, Petrović	patronymic; descendant of Petar or Petre (Peter in Macedonian)
6	17,476	Bajrami	Bajram, Bajramovski, Bajramoski, Bajramov, Bajramovska, Bajramoska, Bajramova, Bajramović	patronymic; descendant of Bajram
7	15,640	Ivanovski	Ivanoski, Ivanov, Ivanovska, Ivanoska, Ivanova, Ivanović	patronymic; descendant of Ivan
8	13,705	Osmani	Osman, Osmanli, Osmanovski, Osmanoski, Osmanov, Osmanovska, Osmanoska, Osmanova, Osmanović	patronymic; descendant of Osman ("wise", in Ottoman Turkish)
9	12,578	Ademi	Adem, Ademovski, Ademoski, Ademov, Ademovska, Ademoska, Ademova, Ademić	patronymic; descendant of Adem (Adam in Ottoman Turkish)
10	12,367	Shabani	Shaban, Shabanovski, Shabanoski, Shabanov, Shabanovska, Shabanoska, Shabanova	patronymic; descendant of Shaban (name of the eight month in the Islamic Calendar)

Macedonian surnames inflect through grammatical cases (in this case, gender). It is common for male surnames to end in -ski and -ov, while female ones end in -ska and -va.

== Norway ==
Rank	#	Surname	Meaning
1	53,011	Hansen	patronymic; son of Hans
2	50,088	Johansen	patronymic; son of Johan or Johannes
3	49,303	Olsen	patronymic; son of Olav, Ole, Olaf or Ola
4	37,869	Larsen	patronymic; son of Lars, Lauritz or Laurits
5	37,206	Andersen	patronymic; son of Anders (or Andres)
6	35,402	Pedersen	patronymic; son of Peder, (Petter, Peter or Per)
7	34,941	Nilsen	patronymic; son of Nils (or Niels)
8	23,595	Kristiansen	patronymic; son of Kristian (or Christian)
9	23,079	Jensen	patronymic; son of Jens
10	21,330	Karlsen	patronymic; son of Karl (or Carl)
11	20,755	Johnsen	patronymic; son of John (or Jon)
12	20,226	Pettersen	patronymic; son of Petter, (Peter, Peder or Per)
13	19,241	Eriksen	patronymic; son of Erik, (Eirik or Erich)
14	18,133	Berg	farm name; a mountain
15	14,392	Haugen	farm name; the Hill
16	14,126	Hagen	farm name; the garden
17	13,387	Johannessen	patronymic; son of Johannes (or Johan)
18	12,139	Andreassen	patronymic; son of Andreas
19	11,925	Jacobsen	patronymic; son of Jacob (or Jakob)
20	11,540	Dahl	farm name; a valley
21	11,481	Jørgensen	patronymic; son of Jørgen
22	11,477	Halvorsen	patronymic; son of Halvor (or Hallvard)
23	11,364	Henriksen	patronymic; son of Henrik (or Henrich)
24	11,282	Lund	farm name; a grove

== Poland ==
Rank	Surname	Meaning	Numbers
1	Nowak	newman	207,348
2	Kowalski	from kowal 'smith'	140,471
3	Wiśniewski	from wiśnia 'cherry'	111,174
4	Wójcik	from wójt, a noun describing chief officer of a municipality (gmina), or from a popular name Wojciech; from the word wojak' 'warrior'	100,064
5	Kowalczyk	from kowal 'smith', literally 'smith's son'	98,739
6	Kamiński	from kamień 'stone'	95,816
7	Lewandowski	from lawenda 'lavender'	93,404
8	Zieliński	from zielony 'green'; from zioło, ziele 'herb'	91,522
9	Szymański	from Szymon, equivalent to Simon or Polish for German Schuhmann 'shoemaker'	89,698
10	Woźniak	from woźny, 'usher'	89,015
11	Dąbrowski	from dąbrowa 'oak grove'	87,304
12	Kozłowski	from kozioł 'goat'	76,657
13	Jankowski	from Janek, a diminutive of John	69,280
14	Mazur	Masurian	68,090
15	Kwiatkowski	from kwiatek 'flower (dim.)'	66,917
16	Wojciechowski	from the name Wojciech; from the word wojak 'warrior'	66,879
17	Krawczyk	from krawiec 'tailor', 'tailor's son'	64,543
18	Kaczmarek	from karczmarz 'innkeeper'	62,399
19	Piotrowski	from Piotr (Peter)	61,844
20	Grabowski	from grab 'hornbeam' or grabarz 'gravedigger'	59,052

Polish names which end with -ski or -cki or -dzki have both male and female forms – Kamiński/Kamińska, Wielicki/Wielicka, Zawadzki/Zawadzka etc. This needs to be considered when taking a count by, for instance, scanning a telephone book. Historically, -ski, -cki and -dzki, cognate with English -ish and French -esque, was a particle of nobility, like German von.

== Portugal ==
The 50 most frequent surnames in Portugal are listed below. A number of these surnames may be preceded by of/from (de, d') or of the/from the (do, da, dos, das) as in de Sousa, da Costa, d'Oliveira. Those elements are not part of the surname and are not considered in an alphabetical order.

Order	Surname	Meaning	Frequency %	Origin
1	Silva	toponymic; woodland	9.44%	Latin silva
2	Santos	saints	5.96%	Latin sanctus
3	Ferreira	blacksmith	5.25%	Latin ferrarius
4	Pereira	pear tree	4.88%	Latin pirus
5	Oliveira	olive tree	3.71%	Latin oliva
6	Costa	toponymic; '[from the] coast'	3.68%	Latin costa
7	Rodrigues	patronymic; 'son of Rodrigo'	3.57%	Germanic Roderich
8	Martins	patronymic; 'son of Martim'	3.23%	Latin Martinus
9	Jesus	'Jesus'	2.99%	Latin Iesus < Hebrew Yeshua
10	Sousa	toponymic; '[from] Sousa'	2.95%	Latin saxa
11	Fernandes	patronymic; 'son of Fernando'	2.82%	Germanic Ferdinand
12	Gonçalves	patronymic; 'son of Gonçalo'	2.76%	Germanic Gundisalv
13	Gomes	patronymic; 'son of Gome', 'Gomo'	2.57%	Germanic guma
14	Lopes	patronymic; 'son of Lopo'	2.52%	Latin lupus
15	Marques	patronymic; 'son of Marco'	2.51%	Latin Marcus
16	Alves	patronymic; 'son of Álvaro'	2.37%	Germanic alfhari, alfarr
17	Almeida	toponymic	2.27%	Arabic al majid
18	Ribeiro	toponymic; 'brook'	2.27%	Latin riparius
19	Pinto	painted or spotted	2.09%	Latin pictus
20	Carvalho	oak	1.97%	Celtic cassos, cassanos
21	Teixeira	toponymic; 'yew'	1.69%	Latin taxus
22	Moreira	toponymic; 'mulberry'	1.54%	Latin mora
23	Correia	belt	1.53%	Celtic (Latinised) korriį
24	Mendes	patronymic; 'son of Mendo'	1.39%	Germanic Hermengild
25	Nunes	patronymic; 'son of Nuno'	1.32%	Latin nonus, nunnus
26	Soares	patronymic; 'son of Soeiro'	1.28%	Germanic (Latinised) Suarius
27	Vieira	scallop	1.2%	Latin veneria
28	Monteiro	toponymic; '[from the] mountain'	1.11%	Latin mons
29	Cardoso	toponymic; 'thistle'	1.07%	Latin carduus
30	Rocha	toponymic; 'rock'	1.04%	Celtic (Latinised) roc'h
31	Neves	snows, devotion to (Our Lady of the Snows)	0.98%	Latin nigvem
32	Coelho	rabbit	0.97%	Celtiberian cunicos
33	Cruz	cross (of Jesus)	0.94%	Latin crux
34	Cunha	wedge	0.93%	Latin cuneus
35	Pires	patronymic; son of Pero	0.92%	Greek Πετρος (Petros)
36	Duarte	patronymic; 'keeper of riches'	0.86%	Germanic Edward
37	Reis	devotion to the Three Kings	0.85%	Latin rex
38	Simões	patronymic; 'son of Simão'	0.85%	Greek Σιμων (Simon)
39	Antunes	patronymic; 'son of António'	0.82%	Etruscan Antonius
40	Matos	toponymic; 'bush'	0.82%	Late Latin matta
41	Fonseca	toponymic; 'dry fountain'	0.81%	Latin fons siccus
42	Machado	axe	0.76%	Latin marculatum
43	Araújo	patronymic	0.69%	Germanic ruderic
44	Barbosa	beard	0.69%	Latin barba
45	Tavares	toponymic	0.67%	Latin Talavaris
46	Lourenço	Laurentius, related to laurels	0.65%	Latin Laurentum
47	Castro	toponymic; 'castle, fortress'	0.62%	Latin castrum
48	Figueiredo	toponymic; 'fig'	0.62%	Latin fīcus
49	Azevedo	toponymic; 'holly'	0.60%	Latin aquifolium
50	Freitas	toponymic; 'hillside'	0.60%	Latin fracta

== Romania ==
Rank	Surname	Pronunciation	Meaning
1	Popa	[ˈpopa]	priest
2	Popescu	[poˈpesku]	lit. son of a priest
3	Pop	[pop]	short form of Popa
4	Radu	[ˈradu]	
5	Dumitru	[duˈmitru]	
6	Stan	[stan]	shortened form of Stanislav
7	Stoica	[ˈstojka]	
8	Gheorghe	[ˈɡe̯orɡe]	form of George
9	Matei	[maˈtej]	Romanian form of Matthew
10	Ciobanu	[tʃjoˈbanu]	shepherd
11	Ionescu	[joˈnesku]	lit. Johnson from Ion, Romanian form of John
12	Rusu	[rusu]	Russian

== Russia ==
See also: Список общерусских фамилий (in Russian Wikipedia)

The most common surnames in Russia, as calculated by Yumaguzin and Vinnik (2019):

Rank	Surname	Transliteration	Meaning	Percentage
1	Ивано́в/Ивано́ва	Ivanov/Ivanova	descendant of Ivan (John)	0.64275
2	Кузнецо́в/Кузнецо́ва	Kuznetsov/Kuznetsova	smith's	0.35634
3	Смирно́в/Смирно́ва	Smirnov/Smirnova	descendant of Smirnoy (meek one)	0.31630
4	Попо́в/Попо́ва	Popov/Popova	priest's descendant	0.31260
5	Петро́в/Петро́ва	Petrov/Petrova	descendant of Pyotr (Peter)	0.30807
6	Васи́льев/Васи́льева	Vasilyev/Vasilyeva	descendant of Vasily (Basil)	0.26549
7	Магоме́дов/Магоме́дова	Magomedov/Magomedova	descendant of Magomed (Muhammad)	0.23628
8	Али́ев/Али́ева	Aliyev/Aliyeva	descendant of Ali	0.22763
9	Кари́мов/Кари́мова	Karimov/Karimova	descendant of Karim	0.19051
10	Во́лков/Во́лкова	Volkov/Volkova	wolf's	0.18828
11	Семёнов/Семёнова	Semyonov/Semyonova	descendant of Semyon (Simon)	0.18682
12	Миха́йлов/Миха́йлова	Mikhaylov/Mikhaylova	descendant of Mikhail (Michael)	0.18355
13	Па́влов/Па́влова	Pavlov/Pavlova	descendant of Pavel (Paul)	0.18256
14	Козло́в/Козло́ва	Kozlov/Kozlova	he-goat's; metaphorically: bearded one	0.18177
15	Фёдоров/Фёдорова	Fyodorov/Fyodorova	descendant of Fyodor (Theodore)	0.17727
16	Но́виков/Но́викова	Novikov/Novikova	new man's/woman's; see novik for historical details	0.17388
17	Ибраги́мов/Ибраги́мова	Ibragimov/Ibragimova	descendant of Ibrahim	0.17150
18	Соколо́в/Соколо́ва	Sokolov/Sokolova	falcon's	0.17071
19	Моро́зов/Моро́зова	Morozov/Morozova	frost's	0.16877
20	За́йцев/За́йцева	Zaytsev/Zaytseva	hare's	0.16217

Those Russian surnames that end with -ov/-ev or -in/-yn are originally patronymic or metronymic possessive adjectivals with the meaning 'son of' or 'daughter/wife of' (the feminine is formed with the -a ending – Smirnova, Ivanova, etc.). In older documents such surnames were written with the word syn 'son', for example, Ivánov syn 'John's son' or Il'yín syn 'Elijah's son'; the last word was later dropped. Such names are roughly equivalent to the English or Welsh surnames Richardson or Richards.

The Russian equivalent of 'Smith', 'Jones', and 'Brown' (that is, the generic most often used surnames) are Ivanov, Petrov, Sidorov, or 'Johns', 'Peters', and 'Isidores', although Sidorov is now ranked only 66th.

== Serbia ==
Rank	Surname	Cyrillic script	Meaning
1	Jovanović	Јовановић	son of Jovan (John)
2	Petrović	Петровић	son of Petar (Peter)
3	Nikolić	Николић	son of Nikola (Nicholas)
4	Marković	Марковић	son of Marko (Mark)
5	Đorđević	Ђорђевић	son of Đorđe (George)
6	Stojanović	Стојановић	son of Stojan (Stoyan)
7	Ilić	Илић	son of Ilija (Elijah)
8	Stanković	Станковић	son of Stanko (Stanislav)
9	Pavlović	Павловић	son of Pavle (Paul)
10	Milošević	Милошевић	son of Miloš (Miles)

== Slovakia ==
Rank	#	Surname	Meaning	Origins
1	30,813	Horváth	Croat	Croatian through Hungarian
2	29,079	Kováč	blacksmith	Slavic, Indo-European
3	21,650	Varga	leatherworker, cobbler	Hungarian
4	21,604	Tóth	Slovak (Slav)	Germanic through Hungarian
5	19,341	Nagy	large/tall	Hungarian
6	14,114	Baláž	blessed	Hungarian via Latin Blasius and Old Church Slavonic 'blessed', from Indo-European
7	13,998	Szabó	tailor	Hungarian
8	12,632	Molnár	Miller	Slavic through Hungarian
9	10,872	Balog	left-handed	Hungarian, or from Slavic marsh, or both
10	9,718	Lukáč	Luke Latin Lucas,	Greek
11	9,712	Novák	Newman	Slavic, Indo-European
12	9,567	Kovács	blacksmith	Slavic through Hungarian
13	9,352	Polák	Pole	Slavic, Indo-European
14	8,777	Gajdoš	bagpiper	Slavic, Indo-European
15	8,699	Kollár	wheeler	Slavic, Indo-European
16	7,895	Hudák	musician	Slavic, Indo-European
17	7,491	Neméth	German	Slavic through Hungarian
18	7,472	Kováčik	blacksmith	Slavic, Indo-European
19	7,240	Oláh	Vlach, Romanian	Hungarian
20	7,223	Oravec	from the Orava region	Slavic, Indo-European

Note: The most common surnames in Slovakia are a mixture of Indo-European and the Ugric roots reflecting the 900-year-long coexistence of the Indo-European Slovaks and speakers of other Indo-European languages with Ugric Hungarians and the Croatians, under Hungarian assimilation pressure throughout the 19th century (see Magyarization, see History of Slovakia). In 1910 Hungarians made up one-third of the population of the present-day territory of Slovakia. Hungarians are currently an 8% minority in Slovakia. (see Demographics of Slovakia). While ethnic Hungarians are relatively few in Slovakia, their large presence on the list of most common names reflects the intra-lingual frequency of the frequent names in Hungary.

== Slovenia ==
Rank	#	Surname	Meaning
1	11,196	Novak	new man; from a newly established farm
2	9,762	Horvat	Croat
3	5,640	Kovačič	son of a blacksmith
4	5,585	Krajnc	from Carniola
5	5,019	Zupančič	son of a farmer or the village elder
6	4,729	Potočnik	near a stream
7	4,729	Kovač	blacksmith
8	3,957	Mlakar	near a puddle
9	3,905	Kos	blackbird
10	3,885	Vidmar	farmer belonging to the ruler's estate
11	3,855	Golob	pigeon
12	3,506	Turk	Turk
13	3,421	Božič	Christmas
14	3,418	Kralj	King
15	3,285	Korošec	from Carinthia
16	3,256	Zupan	mayor (originally, village elder)
17	3,209	Bizjak	archaic term for refugee; usually applied to Slavic Christian families that had fled from the Ottoman Empire
18	3,136	Hribar	from the hill
19	3,069	Kotnik	from a remote area (literally, from a corner)
20	3,003	Kavčič	weaver
21	2,992	Rozman	
22	2,873	Kastelic	from a castle
23	2,841	Oblak	cloud
24	2,828	Žagar	sawer
25	2,821	Petek	Friday
26	2,808	Hočevar	from Kočevje or from Gottschee County
27	2,807	Kolar	
28	2,738	Košir	
29	2,598	Koren	
30	2,399	Klemenčič	son of Klemen

== Spain ==
The top ten surnames cover about 20% of the population, with important geographical differences. The regional distribution of surnames within Spain was homogenized mostly through internal migrations, especially since 1950. Names typical of the old crown of Castile have become the most common all over the country. Most of the common Spanish patronymic surnames were introduced in Spain during the fifth to seventh centuries by the Visigoths.

Rank	Surname	#	%	Meaning
1	García	1,378,000	3.48	possibly meaning 'young' from Basque
2	Fernández	851,000	2.15	patronymic; son of Fernando, Fredenand, or Fridnand
3	González	839,000	2.12	patronymic; son of Gonzalo, from the Latinised form Gundisalvus
4	Rodríguez	804,000	2.03	patronymic; son of Rodrigo
5	López	796,000	2.01	patronymic; son of Lope, Latin Lupus 'wolf'
6	Martínez	788,000	1.97	patronymic; son of Martín, Latin Martis, genitive form of Mars
7	Sánchez	725,000	1.83	patronymic; son of Sancho, Latin Sanctius
8	Pérez	709,000	1.79	patronymic; son of Pedro, Latin Petrus
9	Martín	459,000	1.16	from Latin name Martinus, a derivation of Mars; alternately, a Hispanicization of the Hebrew name Mordecai
10	Gómez	440,000	1.11	patronymic; son of Gomes, Gomo, or Gomaro
11	Ruiz	321,000	0.81	patronymic; son of Rui, variation or short for Rodrigo
12	Hernández	305,000	0.77	patronymic; son of Hernando, variation of Fernando
13	Jiménez	293,000	0.74	patronymic; son of Jimeno, Xemeno, or Ximeno
14	Díaz	293,000	0.74	patronymic; son of Diego
15	Álvarez	273,000	0.69	patronymic; son of Álvaro, from Alvar
16	Moreno	261,000	0.66	brown-haired, tanned, brunet
17	Muñoz	241,000	0.61	patronymic; son of Munio or Muño
18	Alonso	206,000	0.52	variation of Alfonso
19	Gutiérrez	170,000	0.43	patronymic; son of Gutier, Gutierre, or Gualtierre
20	Romero	170,000	0.43	from Latin "romaeus" (lit. "roman") in the sense of 'pilgrim'
21	Navarro	158,400	0.40	Navarrese, (from Navarre)
22	Torres	134,600	0.34	toponymic; 'towers'
23	Domínguez	134,600	0.34	patronymic; 'son of Domingo', from Latin Domenicus, Dominus, 'master'
24	Gil	134,600	0.34	patronymic; from older form Egidio
25	Vázquez	130,000	0.33	patronymic; son of Vasco
26	Serrano	122,700	0.31	'highlander' or 'man from the mountain range'
27	Ramos	118,000	0.30	'branches'; meaning born during the Christian feast of Palm Sunday
28	Blanco	118,000	0.30	'white'
29	Sanz	106,900	0.27	patronymic; son of Sancho, from Latin Sanctius
30	Castro	102,900	0.26	toponymic; from Latin castrum meaning 'castle, fort, fortress'
31	Suárez	102,900	0.26	patronymic; son of Suero or Suaro
32	Ortega	99,000	0.25	from Ortiga, meaning 'nettle plant'
33	Rubio	99,000	0.25	'blond, fair-haired'; Latin Rubeus, meaning 'ruddy, reddish'
34	Molina	99,000	0.25	'mill' or 'place with mills'
35	Delgado	95,000	0.24	'thin, slender, skinny'
36	Ramírez	95,000	0.24	patronymic; son of Ramiro, Radamir, or Radmir
37	Morales	95,000	0.24	toponymic; 'blackberry groves' or 'mulberry trees'
38	Ortiz	87,120	0.22	patronymic; son of Ortún; Latin Fortunius, meaning 'fortunate one'
39	Marín	83,160	0.21	Latin Marinus, meaning 'sailor'
40	Iglesias	83,160	0.21	'churches'

Source: – Data from December 1999. (2004 data confirmation of top 25)

=== Canary Islands ===
Rank	Surname	Approximate percentage
1	González	4.79
2	Rodríguez	4.64
3	Hernández	4.01
4	Pérez	3.35
5	García	3.25
6	Martín	2.21
7	Santana	2.18
8	Díaz	1.86
9	Suárez	1.38
10	Sánchez	1.29
11	López	1.21
12	Cabrera	1.18
13	Ramos	0.88
14	Medina	0.87
15	Fernández	0.75
16	Morales	0.73
17	Delgado	0.70
18	Marrero	0.70
19	León	0.69
20	Alonso	0.61
21	Herrera	0.59
22	Cruz	0.58
23	Domínguez	0.55
24	Gutiérrez	0.52
25	Reyes	0.50
26	Torres	0.48
27	Alvarez	0.66
28	Rivero	0.44
29	Armas	0.42
30	Trujillo	0.40

== Sweden ==
Source: World Family Names

Rank	#	Surname	Meaning
1	251,621	Andersson	son of Anders
2	251,495	Johansson	son of Johan
3	223,151	Karlsson	son of Karl
4	171,360	Nilsson	son of Nils
5	147,514	Eriksson	son of Erik
6	124,686	Larsson	son of Lars
7	114,280	Olsson	son of Olof, Olov, Ola, Ole or Olle (usually a nickname)
8	107,911	Persson	son of Per
9	101,834	Svensson	son of Sven
10	97,536	Gustafsson	son of Gustaf
11	96,011	Pettersson	son of Petter
12	73,869	Jonsson	son of Jon
13	50,170	Jansson	son of Jan
14	43,926	Hansson	son of Hans
15	34,302	Bengtsson	son of Bengt
16	32,249	Jönsson	son of Jöns
17	27,533	Lindberg	compound of lind (the tree tilia cordata) and berg 'mountain'
18	26,793	Jakobsson	son of Jakob
19	26,562	Magnusson	son of Magnus
20	26,424	Olofsson	son of Olof

List of the 10 most common names among the Sami people (compiled from one third of the Sametinget voting list 2005):

Rank	Surname	Meaning
1	Andersson	son of Anders
2	Johansson	son of Johan
3	Nilsson	son of Nils
4	Larsson	son of Lars
5	Persson	son of Per
6	Blind	? of Sami descent
7	Jonsson	son of Jon
8	Eriksson	son of Erik
9	Nutti	? of Sami descent
10	Labba	? of Sami descent

== Switzerland ==
German-speaking cantons (1998): Source:

Rank	#	Surname	Meaning
1	31,000	Müller	miller
2	19,150	Meier	tenant of a large farm
3	16,900	Schmid	blacksmith
4	13,000	Keller	winemaker
5	11,850	Weber	weaver
6	10,550	Huber	tenant of a small large farm
7	10,350	Meyer	tenant of a large farm
8	10,300	Schneider	tailor
9	8,950	Steiner	'stone person'
10	8,200	Fischer	fisherman
11	8,100	Brunner	'water well person'
12	8,000	Baumann	'construction man'
13	7,950	Gerber	tanner
14	7,750	Frei	free (in terms of freedom)
15	7,500	Moser	'bog person'

Surnames of the Italian-speaking canton of Ticino

Rank	Surname	Meaning
1	Bianchi	white
2	Bernasconi	
3	Fontana	one who dwells by a fountain
4	Crivelli	sieve
5	Galli	Gaul; Frenchman
6	Cereghetti	
7	Colombo	dove (often bestowed upon orphans)
8	Rossi	red, redhead
9	Ferrari	blacksmith
10	Cavadini	
11	Sante	
12	Ravelli	
13	Giovanni	John
14	Piero	Peter

== Turkey ==
Rank	Surname	Meaning
1	Yılmaz	unyielding, indomitable
2	Kaya	rock
3	Demir	iron
4	Şahin	buteo, hawk
5	Çelik	steel
6	Yıldız	star
7	Yıldırım	thunderbolt
8	Öztürk	pure Turk
9	Aydın	enlightened
10	Özdemir	pure iron
11	Arslan	lion
12	Doğan	born, rising, falcon
13	Kılıç	sword
14	Aslan	lion
15	Çetin	tough
16	Kara	black
17	Koç	ram (animal)
18	Kurt	wolf
19	Özkan	pure blood
20	Şimşek	lightning
21	Polat	hardy, steel
22	Özcan	pure soul
23	Korkmaz	unfearful
24	Çakır	grayish-blue
25	Erdoğan	brave born, male/private falcon

Source: Turkish General Directorate of Population and Citizenships

== Ukraine ==
Many of the surnames use the same root but different suffixes, or even different roots of the same meaning, depending on the part of Ukraine the person hails from.

Rank	Surname	Meaning
1	Melnyk	miller
2	Shevchenko	shoemaker's
3	Boyko	combatant's
4	Kovalenko	smith's
5	Bondarenko	cooper's
6	Tkachenko	weaver's
7	Kovalchuk	smith's
8	Kravchenko	tailor's
9	Yakovenko	Yakov's
10	Shevchuk	shoemaker's
11	Koval	smith
12	Polishchuk	the Polesian, a man from Polesia
13	Bondar	cooper
14	Tkachuk	weaver's
15	Moroz	frost
16	Marchenko	Mark's
17	Lysenko	fox's (from Lys) or baldhead's (from Lysyi)
18	Rudenko	redhead's
19	Savchenko	Savka's (Savka is a form of Sava or Savva)
20	Petrenko	Petro's

== United Kingdom ==
=== England ===
Rank	Surname	Percentage
1	Smith	1.26
2	Jones	0.75
3	Taylor	0.59
4	Brown	0.56
5	Williams	0.39
6	Wilson	0.39
7	Johnson	0.37
8	Davies	0.34
9	Patel	0.32
10	Wright	0.32
11	Thompson	0.31
12	Evans	0.30
13	Walker	0.30
14	White	0.30
15	Roberts	0.28
16	Green	0.28
17	Hall	0.28
18	Wood	0.27
19	Jackson	0.27
20	Clark	0.26

=== Northern Ireland ===
Rank	Surname	Origin	%
1	Wilson	England	0.75
2	Campbell	Scotland	0.75
3	Kelly	Ireland	0.74
4	Johnston	Scotland	0.69
5	Moore	Ireland/England	0.62
6	Thompson	England	0.61
7	Smyth	England	0.60
8	Brown	Scotland	0.59
9	O’Neill	Ireland	0.57
10	Doherty	Ireland	0.54
11	Stewart	Scotland	0.54
12	Quinn	Ireland	0.51
13	Robinson	England	0.50
14	Murphy	Ireland	0.49
15	Graham	England	0.48
16	Martin	England/France	0.45
17	McLaughlin	Ireland	0.45
18	Hamilton	Scotland	0.44
19	Murray	Scotland/Ireland	0.43
20	Hughes	Wales	0.41

=== Scotland ===
Rank	Surname	%
1	Smith	1.28
2	Brown	0.94
3	Wilson	0.89
4	Robertson	0.78
5	Thomson	0.78
6	Campbell	0.77
7	Stewart	0.73
8	Anderson	0.70
9	Scott	0.55
10	Murray	0.53
11	MacDonald	0.52
12	Reid	0.52
13	Taylor	0.49
14	Clark	0.47
15	Ross	0.43
16	Young	0.42
17	Mitchell	0.41
18	Watson	0.41
19	Paterson	0.40
20	Morrison	0.40

=== Wales ===
Rank	Surname	%
1	Jones	5.75
2	Williams	3.72
3	Davies	3.72
4	Evans	2.47
5	Thomas	2.43
6	Roberts	1.53
7	Lewis	1.53
8	Hughes	1.23
9	Morgan	1.16
10	Griffiths	0.96
11	Edwards	0.93
12	Smith	0.85
13	James	0.82
14	Rees	0.81
15	Jenkins	0.69
16	Owen	0.67
17	Price	0.67
18	Phillips	0.65
19	Moss	0.63
20	Driscoll	0.53 (Ireland)

== See also ==
- List of family name affixes
- List of most popular given names
- Lists of most common surnames, for other continents
