= Heilig =

Heilig may refer to:

- Heilig-Geist-Gymnasium, several schools
- Heilig (surname)
- Morton Heilig (1926–1997), American cinematographer and innovator of Virtual Reality (VR) cinematography
- "Heilig" (E Nomine song), 2007
- "Heilig" (Tokio Hotel song), 2008
