= Filip Kaczmarek =

Filip Kaczmarek can refer to:

- Filip Andrzej Kaczmarek, born 1966, Polish politician
- Filip Kacper Kaczmarek, born 2007, Polish footballer
