= Kaczmarek =

Kaczmarek (Polish pronunciation: [kat͡ʂˈmarɛk]; archaic feminine: Kaczmarkowa, plural Kaczmarkowie) is the 18th most common surname in Poland (62,399 people in 2009) and the second most popular in Greater Poland (24,185) and Lubusz Land (3,121). The name is a diminutive from the Old Polish version of the word karczmarz, meaning "innkeeper".

== Notable people ==
- Adam Kaczmarek (born 1961), Polish sport shooter
- Bogusław Kaczmarek (born 1950), Polish football manager
- Filip Kacper Kaczmarek (born 2007), Polish footballer
- Filip Andrzej Kaczmarek (born 1966), Polish politician
- Gabriele Katzmarek (born 1960), German politician
- Jan A. P. Kaczmarek (1953–2024), Polish composer
- Jan Kaczmarek (actor) (b. 6 June 1945, d. 14 November 2007), Polish singer and songwriter
- Jane Kaczmarek (born 1955), American actress
- Jerzy Kaczmarek (born 1948), Polish fencer
- Konrad Kaczmarek, Polish footballer
- Łukasz Kaczmarek (born 1994), Polish volleyball player
- Marcin Kaczmarek (swimmer) (born 1977), Polish swimmer
- Marcin Kaczmarek (footballer, born 1974), Polish football player
- Marcin Kaczmarek (footballer, born 1979), Polish football player
- Marta Kaczmarek, Polish-Australian actress
- Mateusz Kaczmarek, Polish footballer
- Natalia Kaczmarek (born 1998), Polish athlete
- Oliver Kaczmarek (born 1970), German politician
- Paweł Kaczmarek (footballer) (born 1985), Polish footballer
- Paweł Kaczmarek (canoeist) (born 1995), Polish sprint kayaker
- Wojciech Szczęsny Kaczmarek (1942–2009), Polish politician
- Tomasz Kaczmarek, Polish football manager
- Zbigniew Waldemar Kaczmarek (born 1962), Polish football player
- Zbigniew Tadeusz Kaczmarek (1946–2023), Polish weightlifter

== Fictional characters ==
- Pete Kaczmarek (portrayed by Jerry O'Connell) in The Defenders
- Clay Kaczmarek, also known as "Subject 16", in the Assassin's Creed franchise

== See also ==
- Karczmarek
- Karczmarz
- Kaczmarz
- Kreczmar
