= Ciobanu (disambiguation) =

Ciobanu is a commune in Constanţa County, Romania.

Ciobanu may also refer to:

- Ciobanu (surname), a surname
- Ciobanu River, a tributary of the Slătioara River
- Marinika Tepić (née Čobanu; born 1974), Serbian politician of Romanian ethnicity
- Sebastian Ciobanu (born 1985), Romanian kickboxer
