= Erind (given name) =

Erind is an Albanian masculine given name. Notable people with the name include:

- Erind Prifti (born 1991), Greece-born Albanian football goalkeeper
- Erind Selimaj (born 1989), Albanian football player
