= Abazi =

Abazi is a surname. Notable people with the surname include:

- Hasan Abazi (born c. 1947), Kosovar trade unionist
- Eduard Abazi (born 1968), Albanian footballer
- Arsim Abazi (born 1972), Kosovar footballer and manager
- Dren Abazi (born 1985), Kosovar singer
- Almeda Abazi (born 1992), Albanian-born Turkish actress, model and beauty pageant titleholder
- Leonit Abazi (born 1993), Kosovar footballer

== See also ==
- Abazai, a village and Union Council in Pakistan
- Georgian abazi, a former unit of currency in Georgia
