= Prifti =

Origin
- Meaning: Priest (Albanian: prift)

Other names
- Variant forms: Priftaj, Priftis

Prifti is an Albanian surname meaning "the priest". Notable people with the name include:

- Albi Prifti (born 1993), Albanian footballer
- Andi Prifti (born 1988), Albanian footballer
- Antonia Prifti (born 2001), Greek kickboxer
- Dimitri-Erind Prifti (born 1991), Greek footballer
- Dritan Prifti (1968–2017), Albanian politician
- Erind Prifti (born 1991), Albanian footballer
- Mihal Prifti (1918–1986), Albanian Communist politician
- Naum Prifti (1932–2023), Albanian writer, screenwriter and playwright
- Vladimir Prifti (1942–2023), Albanian film director, screenwriter and producer

== See also ==
- Prifti, Montenegro, a village near Podgorica
