= Lehner =

Lehner is a surname. It derives from the Middle High German verb lehen "to hold land as a feudal tenant", and was once used to indicate a person's status as a land-holder.

Persons with this surname include:

- Christine Lehner (born 1952), American novelist and short story writer
- Daniel Lehner (born 1994), Austrian racing cyclist
- Edward H. Lehner (born 1933), American politician
- Ernst Lehner (1912–1986), German footballer
- Eugene Lehner (1906–1997), Hungarian violist and music educator
- Gerald Lehner (born 1963), Austrian journalist and author
- Gerald Lehner (born 1968), Austrian football referee
- Helmuth Lehner (born 1968), Austrian metal musician
- Hugo Lehner (1902–1952), Swiss alpine guide and skier
- Joseph Lehner (1912–2013), American mathematician
- Karl-Heinz Lehner, Austrian operatic baritone
- Katharina Lehner (born 1990), German mixed martial artist
- Mark Lehner, American archaeologist
- Otto Lehner (1898–1977), Swiss cyclist
- Paul Lehner (1920–1967), American baseball outfielder
- Peggy Lehner (born 1950), American politician (Republican Party)
- Peter Lehner (born 1958), American lawyer and environmentalist
- Robin Lehner (born 1991), Swedish ice hockey goaltender
- Stefan Lehner (born 1957), Swiss designer
- Ulrich L. Lehner (born 1976), German theologian
- Waltraud Hollinger, birth name of Valie Export (1940–2026), Austrian avant-garde artist
- Wilhelm Lehner (1914–2012), German military officer

== See also ==
- Lechner (a variant)
