= Sahak (given name) =

- Pronunciation: Eastern Armenian: [sɑˈhɑk] Western Armenian: [sɑˈhɑɡ]
- Gender: Male

Origin
- Origin: Armenian, from Greek, from Hebrew

Other names
- Variant form: Isahak

Sahak or Sahag (Armenian: Սահակ) is an Armenian male given name equivalent to English Isaac. It was originally a popular form of the name Isahak (Armenian: Իսահակ), formed by apheresis of the first unstressed syllable. Isahak was borrowed into Classical Armenian from the Greek Isaā́k, which derives from Hebrew Yīṣḥāq. The Armenian surnames Sahakyan, Ter-Sahakyan and Isahakyan come from this name.

== Forms and derivatives ==
The original form Isahak is much less common than the form Sahak. A female derivative, Sahakanuysh or Sahakanush, formed from the name Sahak and the word anu(y)sh, meaning 'sweet', is recorded as the name of the daughter of Catholicos Sahak in the 4th century. Another female derivative is Sahak(a)dukht, which is a combination of the name Sahak with the Persian word dukht, meaning 'daughter'.

== Notable people ==
- Sahak (350–438), Catholicos of the Armenian Church c. 387–439
- Sahak I, 4th-century Armenian Catholicos
- Sahak III, Catholicos of the Armenian Church c. 677–703
- Sahak II Bagratuni, marzban (frontier commander) of Armenia in 482
- Sahak II of Cilicia (1849–1939), Armenian Catholicos of Cilicia
- Sahak III Bagratuni, presiding prince of Armenia (r. 754–771)
- Sahak Sevada, 10th-century Armenian prince (r. 895–940)
- Sultan Sahak, 15th-century Kurdish religious founder and leader
- Sahak II Mashalian (born 1962), Armenian Patriarch of Constantinople since 2019
- Sahak Karapetyan (1906–1987), Armenian Soviet physiologist and politician
- Sahak Parparyan (born 1988), Armenian kickboxer
- Sahak Sahakyan (1929–2010), Armenian sculptor and artist
- Sahak Ter-Gabrielyan (1886–1937), Soviet Armenian politician
- Sahak Torosyan (1885–1940), Armenian politician

== See also ==
- Ashot-Sahak of Vaspurakan, King of Vaspurakan (r. 968/969–991)
