= Krier =

Krier is a surname. Notable people with the surname include:

- Andrew W.K. (born 1979), American singer, multi-instrumentalist, songwriter, record producer
- Antoine Krier (1897–1983), Luxembourgish politician
- Cyndi Taylor Krier (born 1950), American politician
- Herman Krier, American engineer
- Jacques Krier (1926–2008), French television producer and director, novelist
- James E. Krier, American legal scholar
- Léon Krier (1946–2025), Luxembourgish architect, city planner and author; brother of Rob
- Pierre Krier (1885–1947), Luxembourgish politician
- Rob Krier (1938–2023), Luxembourgish architect, city planner and author; brother of Léon
- Tony Krier (1906–1994), Luxembourgish photographer
