= Szymański =

Szymański (feminine: Szymańska, plural Szymańscy) is the 9th most common surname in Poland, belonging to 114,075 people (0.3% of Poland's population) as of 2015.

== Notable people ==
- Adam Szymański (1852–1916), Polish writer
- Antoni Szymański (1894–1973), Polish Army general
- Beata Szymańska (born 1938), Polish poet and writer
- Bolesław Szymański (born 1950), Polish-American computer scientist
- Damian Szymański (born 1995), Polish footballer
- David Szymanski (born 1989), American video game developer
- Dick Szymanski (1932–2021), American football player
- Frank Szymanski (1923–1987), American football player
- Grzegorz Szymański (born 1978), Polish volleyball player
- Halina Szymańska (1906–1989), Polish spy
- Henry Szymanski (1898–1959), American wrestler
- Ignacy Szymański (1806–1874), Polish soldier
- Iwonka Bogumiła Szymańska (born 1943), Polish composer
- Jake Szymanski, (born 1981), American director
- Jake Toranzo Szymanski (born 1994), American actor
- Jakub Szymański (athlete) (born 2002), Polish hurdler
- Jakub Szymański (footballer, born 2000), Polish association football goalkeeper
- Jakub Szymański (footballer, born 2002), Polish association football defender
- Jakub Szymanski (handballer) (born 1983), Czech handball player
- Jakub Szymański (volleyball) (born 1998), Polish volleyball player
- Jan Szymański (born 1989), Polish speed skater
- Jan Szymański (1960–2005), Polish wrestler
- Józef Szymański (1926–2016), Polish bobsledder
- Karol Szymański (born 1993), Polish footballer
- Konrad Szymański (born 1969), Polish politician
- Krystyna Szymańska-Lara (born 1969), Polish basketball player
- Maciej Szymański (born 1957), Polish diplomat
- Marcin Szymański (born 1972), Polish footballer
- Marcin Szymański (born 1983), Polish chess master
- Maria Mickiewicz (née Szymańska in 1984), Polish chess master
- Marija Šimanska (1922–1995), Latvian chemist
- Mike Szymanski (born 1946), American politician
- Paweł Szymański (born 1954), Polish composer
- Roman Szymański (1840–1908), Polish political activist
- Sebastian Szymański (born 1999), Polish footballer
- Stanisław Szymański (1862–1944), Polish industrialist
- Stanisław Szymański (1930–1999), Polish ballet dancer
- Timothy Szymanski, American navy admiral
