= Mlakar =

Mlakar is a Slovene surname. It is the 8th most common surname in Slovenia. It is equally present throughout the country, and it is especially common in Lower Styria, in Inner Carniola and parts of the Slovenian Littoral.

It may refer to:

- Iztok Mlakar (born 1961), Slovenian singer-songwriter, chansonnier and theatre actor
- Jan Mlakar (born 1998), Slovenian footballer
- Jana Mlakar (born 1962), Slovenian cross-country skier
- Janez Mlakar (born 1944), Slovenian ice hockey player
- Julijana Bizjak Mlakar, former Slovenian politician
- Matjaž Mlakar (born 1981), professional handball player
- Oliver Mlakar (born 1935), Croatian television presenter
- Pino Mlakar (1907–2006), Slovenian ballet dancer, choreographer, teacher
- Roy Mlakar (born 1950), president and CEO of the Ottawa Senators professional ice hockey club
- Žiga Mlakar (born 1990), Slovenian handball player

== See also ==
- Stanko Mlakar Stadium, multi-purpose stadium in Kranj, Slovenia
- Mlaka (disambiguation)
- Malakar
