= Popa =

Popa (priest in Romanian) may refer to:

== People ==
- Alina Popa (born 1978), Romanian-Swiss, IFBB professional bodybuilder
- Anatolie Popa (1896–1920), Moldavian military commander
- Celestina Popa (born 1970), Romanian, artistic gymnast
- Constantin Popa (born 1971), Romanian-Israeli basketball player
- Gabriel Popa (painter) (1937–1995), Romanian painter
- Grigore T. Popa (1892–1948), Romanian physician
- Ilie Popa (1907–1983), Romanian mathematician
- Ion Popa (disambiguation), several people
- Iulian Popa (born 1984), Romanian footballer
- Loredan Popa (born 1980), Romanian canoer
- Maria Sara Popa (born 2005), Romanian tennis player
- Marius Popa (born 1978), Romanian footballer
- Mihnea Popa (born 1973), Romanian-American mathematician
- Nicolae Popa (judge) (1939–2024), Romanian judge
- Nicolae Popa (businessman) (born c. 1965), Romanian businessman
- Roxana Popa (born 1997), Romanian born Spanish artistic gymnast
- Sorin Popa (born 1953), Romanian-American mathematician
- Stela Popa (born 1982), Moldovan-Romanian journalist
- Toma Popa (1908–1962), Romanian chess master
- Tudor Petrov-Popa (born 1963), Moldovan-Romanian politician
- Valter Popa, Romanian guitarist
- Vasko Popa (1922–1991), Yugoslav poet of Romanian descent

== Places ==
- Mount Popa, a volcano in central Burma (Myanmar)
- Patriarch Evtimiy Square, Sofia, Bulgaria, commonly known as Popa
- Popa Falls, rapids in the Okavango River
- Popa, Lesotho
- Popocatépetl, a volcano in central Mexico

== Other uses ==
- Popa langur (Trachypithecus popa), a species of langurs in the family cercopithecidae
- Popa (mantis), a genus of praying mantises in the family Deroplatyidae
- Porin Palloilijat (PoPa), a Finnish football club
- Pop All General-Purpose Registers (popa), an instruction in x86 assembly language
- "Popa", a 2024 song by Ice Spice from Y2K!
