= Berisha (surname) =

Surname list

Berisha is an Albanian surname derived from the Berisha tribe in northern Albania. It is found mainly in northern Albania and Kosovo. It may refer to:

- Albin Berisha (born 2001), Kosovan footballer
- Ali Berisha (born 1962), Kosovan medical doctor and politician
- Anton Berisha (born 1946), Albanian scholar and folklorist
- Ardian Berisha (born 1998), Swedish footballer
- Bekë Berisha (born 1978), Kosovan politician
- Bekim Berisha (1966–1998), Kosovar soldier
- Bernard Berisha (born 1991), Kosovar footballer
- Besart Berisha (born 1985), Kosovar Albanian footballer
- Dardan Berisha (born 1988), Polish Kosovar basketball player
- Demo Beriša (born 1963), Serbian military officer and government minister
- Dion Berisha (born 2003), footballer
- Elon Berisha (born 1994), Kosovar football coach
- Elvi Berisha (born 1999), Albanian footballer
- Engjëll Berisha (1926–2010), Kosovar painter
- Ergün Berisha (born 1988), Turkish footballer
- Etrit Berisha (born 1989), Albanian footballer
- Fadil Berisha (born 1973), Albanian American photographer
- Florian Berisha (born 1990), Swiss footballer
- Ilir Berisha (born 1991), Kosovar Albanian footballer
- Jakup Berisha (born 2000), Macedonian footballer
- Johan Berisha (born 1979), Swiss footballer
- Kolë Berisha (1947–2021), Kosovar politician
- Lindon Berisha (born 1989), Albanian pop singer
- Liri Berisha (born 1948), Albanian pediatrician and wife of Sali Berisha
- Medon Berisha (born 2003), Albanian-Swiss association football player
- Mërgim Berisha (born 1998), German footballer of Albanian descent
- Nuhi Berisha (1961–1984), Kosovo Albanian revolutionary and founder of the People's Movement
- Rrustem Berisha (born 1965), Kosovar politician and military officer
- Safet Berisha (1949–2016), Albanian footballer
- Sali Berisha (born 1944), former Albanian prime minister
- Sedat Berisha (born 1989), Macedonian footballer
- Valmir Berisha (born 1996), Swedish footballer
- Valon Berisha (born 1993), Kosovar footballer
- Veton Berisha (born 1994), Norwegian footballer
- Visar Berisha (born 1986), Kosovar footballer
- Vjosa Berisha (1972–2022), director, co-owner and executive director
- Yllka Berisha (born 1988), Swedish Albanian model and singer
- Ymer Berisha (1912–1946), Albanian secondary-school teacher
- Zana Berisha (born 1995), Kosovo Albanian model
