= Baláž =

Baláž (feminine Balážová) is a Slovak surname, derivative of Hungarian Balázs, which may refer to:

- Barbora Balážová (born 1992), Slovak table tennis player
- Blažej Baláž (born 1958), Slovak artist
- Jozef Baláž (born 1999), Slovak ice hockey player
- Juraj Baláž (born 1980), Slovak footballer
- Ľubomíra Balážová (born 1968), Slovak cross-country skier
- Mária Balážová (born 1956), Slovak artist
- Pavol Baláž (born 1984), Slovak footballer
- Peter Baláž (Esperantist) (born 1979), Slovak esperantist and publisher
- Rudolf Baláž (1940–2011), Slovak Catholic bishop
- Vladislav Baláž (born 1984), Slovak ice hockey player

== See also ==
- Peter Baláž (disambiguation)
