= Vītoliņš =

Origin
- Origin: Latvian
- Meaning: "little willow"

Vītoliņš (Old orthography: Wihtolin; feminine: Vītoliņa) is a Latvian topographic surname, derived from the Latvian word for "willow" (vītols). Individuals with the surname include:

- Alvis Vītoliņš (1946–1997), Latvian chess master;
- Harijs Vītoliņš (born 1968), Latvian ice hockey player

== See also ==
- Vītols
