= Shabani =

Shabani (Persian: شَعبانی, adjective form of شعبان (Sha'ban), the name of the eighth month of the Islamic calendar) is a Muslim surname and may refer to:

- Agim Shabani (born 1988), Norwegian footballer of Albanian descent
- Bujar Shabani (born 1990), Kosovar-Albanian footballer; see 2018–19 FC Drita season
- Bunjamin Shabani (born 1991), ethnic Albanian footballer from the Republic of Macedonia
- Hussein Shabani (born 1990), Burundian footballer
- Nasser Shabani (died 2020), Iranian general
- Razie Shabani (1925–2013), Azerbaijani politician and activist
- Shabani Nonda (born 1977), retired DR Congolese footballer
- Xhevdet Shabani (born 1986), Kosovar-Albanian footballer

== Places ==
- Shabani, Iran, village in Kurdistan Province, Iran
- Shabani, Zimbabwe, mining town Zimbabwe

== Other uses ==
- Shabani (gorilla) (born 1996), a tightrope-walking western lowland gorilla at the Higashiyama Zoo in Nagoya, Japan

== See also ==
- Sha'ban (disambiguation)
- Shaybanids, dynasty
