= Ademi =

Ademi is an Albanian surname. Notable people with this surname include:

- Abdylaqim Ademi (1969–2018), Macedonian politician
- Albion Ademi (born 1999), Finnish footballer
- Allmir Ademi (born 1984), Swiss footballer
- Arijan Ademi (born 1991), Croatian footballer
- Kemal Ademi (born 1996), Swiss footballer
- Lorik Ademi (born 2001), Swedish footballer
- Melinda Ademi (born 1995), Albanian-American rapper, singer and songwriter
- Orhan Ademi (born 1991), Swiss footballer
- Rahim Ademi (born 1954), Croatian soldier
- Trim Ademi, known as Capital T (born 1992), Albanian Kosovar rapper
- Vedat Ademi (born 1982), Albanian Kosovar singer-songwriter
