= Prishtina (name) =

Prishtina is an Albanian surname. People with this surname include:

- Hasan Prishtina (1873–1933), Albanian politician
- Kadri Prishtina (1878–1925), Albanian political figure
