= Tony Krier =

Tony (Antoine) Krier (1906–1994) was a Luxembourgish photographer who worked as a photojournalist for the Luxemburger Wort, a daily newspaper. He was also court photographer for the Grand Ducal Family of Luxembourg. He is remembered for his touristic photographs of Luxembourg City and of the country as a whole.

His publications include: Le Souverain et son peuple (1965), Les Châteaux historiques du Luxembourg (1975) and La Vie d'une grande dame (1986).

== Works ==
- Schueberfouer. Children on carousel. 1939
- Fête de la jeunesse. 1958
- Coopérative de Bonnevoie. 1959
- Limpertsberg. 1941
- Eleanor Roosevelt et Perle Mesta au Findel. 1950
- Crèche au plateau Altmünster. 1968
- Prime Minister Churchill accompanied by Prince Félix, leaving the pavillon of the Grand Duke of Luxembourg at the station of Luxembourg city, dated July 15, 1946
- Viscount Montgomery of Alamein, November 1948, at the "caserne du St. Esprit".
- Robert Schuman, Konrad Adenauer, Joseph Bech. August 10, 1952.
