= Cebotari =

Cebotari is a Moldovan and Romanian surname. Notable people with the surname include:

- Boris Cebotari (1975–2012), Moldovan footballer
- Maria Cebotari (1910–1949), Romanian singer and actress
- Nicolae Cebotari (born 1997), Moldovan footballer
- Olga Cebotari (born 1992), Moldovan politician and diplomat
- Serghei Cebotari (born 1981), Moldovan footballer and coach
- Svetlana Cebotari (born 1969), Moldovan politician
