= Petrauskas =

- Lithuanian surname
- m.: Petrauskas
- f.: (unmarried): Petrauskaitė
- f.: (married): Petrauskienė
- Origin: Lithuanized Slavic surname with the meaning "son of Peter"
- Related names: Polish: Piotrowski, Russian: Petrovsky, English: Peterson, Danish: Petersen, Anglicised Polish form: Petrowski

Petrauskas is a Lithuanian surname. Notable people with the surname include:

- Evaldas Petrauskas (born 1992), Lithuanian boxer
- Kipras Petrauskas (1885–1968), Lithuanian singer
- Zenonas Petrauskas (1950–2009), Lithuanian lawyer and deputy foreign minister of Lithuania, associate professor of international law
