= Lakatos =

Lakatos (Hungarian pronunciation: [ˈlɒkɒtoʃ]) is a Hungarian surname (meaning locksmith). Notable people with the surname include:

- Brent Lakatos (born 1980), Canadian athlete
- Dominik Lakatoš (born 1997), Czech ice hockey player of Romani origin
- Géza Lakatos (1890–1967), Hungarian general during World War II; briefly served as Prime Minister of Hungary
- Imre Lakatos (1922–1974), philosopher of mathematics and science
- Imre Schlosser-Lakatos (1889–1959), Hungarian footballer
- Josh Lakatos (born 1973), American target shooter
- Menyhért Lakatos (1926–2007), Hungarian Romani writer
- Pál Lakatos (born 1968), Hungarian boxer
- Roby Lakatos (born 1965), Romani violinist from Hungary
