= Matei (disambiguation) =

Matei is a Romanian given name and surname.

Matei may also refer to:

- Matei, Bistrița-Năsăud, a commune in Bistrița-Năsăud County, Romania
- Maței, a village in Scărișoara Commune, Alba County, Romania
- Matei, an anonymous person referenced by Webdriver Torso
- Matei Airport, an airport in Matei, Fiji
