= Begu =

Begu may refer to:

== People ==
- Begu (nun) (died 690), English nun and saint
- Irina-Camelia Begu (born 1990), Romanian tennis player
- Jacques Bégu (born 1957), French rugby union player

== Places ==
- Begu, Ghana
- Begu, Romania
- Begu Khel, Pakistan
- Begu River, Romania

== Other ==
- Begu (grape)
