= Kováčik =

Kováčik (feminine: Kováčiková) is a Slovak surname, a diminutive form of Kováč. Notable people with the surname include:

- Jozef Kováčik (born 1980), Slovak ice hockey player
- Karen Kovacik, American poet laureate
- Nikola Kováčiková (born 1999), Slovak basketball player
- Peter Kováčik (born 2001), Slovak footballer
- Robert Kovacik, American television journalist
- Zuzana Hlavoňová (née Kováčiková; born 1973), Czech high jumper
