= Ruggiero (surname) =

Ruggiero is a surname of Italian origin. Notable people with the surname include the following:

- Adamo Ruggiero (born 1986), Canadian actor
- Angela Ruggiero (born 1980), American hockey player
- Angelo Ruggiero (1940–1989), Member of the New York City Mafia
- Antonella Ruggiero (born 1952), Italian singer and songwriter
- Benjamin Ruggiero (1926–1994), member of the New York City Mafia
- Deb Ruggiero (born 1958), radio personality and politician from Rhode Island
- Giuseppe Ruggiero (born 1993), Italian footballer
- Joseph S. Ruggiero, better known under his stage name Joey Powers (1934–2017), American singer and songwriter
- Paolo Ruggiero (born 1957), Italian general and member of NATO supreme command
- Renato Ruggiero (1930–2013), Italian politician
- Richard S. Ruggiero (1944–2014), New York politician
- Salvatore Ruggiero (1945–1982), New York City Mafia associate and older brother of Angelo Ruggiero
- Vic Ruggiero, musician and songwriter from New York City
- Viviana Ruggiero (born 1985), Uruguayan journalist and broadcaster
