= Kuqi =

Kuqi is a surname. Notable persons with that name include:

- Albert Kuqi (born 1992), Finnish footballer
- Njazi Kuqi (born 1983), Finnish footballer
- Shefki Kuqi (born 1976), Finnish footballer
- Taulant Kuqi (born 1985), Albanian footballer
