= Delvina (name) =

Delvina is an Albanian surname. People with this surname include:

- Avni Bey Delvina, Albanian politician
- Hiqmet Delvina, Albanian politician
- Sulejman Delvina (1871–1932), Albanian politician
