= Lungu =

Lungu may refer to:

== People ==
=== Politicians ===
- Alexei Lungu (born 1983), Moldovan politician and journalist
- Edgar Lungu (1956–2025), President of Zambia (2015–2021)
- Esther Lungu (born 1961), Former First Lady of Zambia
- Gheorghe Lungu (politician) (born 1949), Moldovan politician
- Tasila Lungu (born 1983), Zambian politician

=== Sportspeople ===
- Adrian Lungu (born 1960), Romanian rugby union player
- Alexandru Lungu (fighter) (born 1974), Romanian martial artist
- Andrei Lungu (born 1989), Romanian football player
- Caius Lungu (1989–2025), Romanian football player
- Cezar Lungu (born 1988), Romanian football player
- Florin Lungu (born 1980), Romanian football player
- Gheorghe Lungu (boxer) (born 1978), Romanian boxer
- Teodor Lungu (born 1995), Moldovan footballer
- Vladislav Lungu (born 1977), Moldovan footballer

=== Authors ===
- Alexandru Lungu (poet) (1924–2008), Romanian poet
- Dan Lungu (born 1969), Romanian novelist

== Other uses ==
- Lungu people of Central Africa
- Lungu language, spoken by the Lungu people
- Lungu, Estonia, village in Estonia
