= Tahirović =

Tahirović is a Bosniak surname. It is derived from "son of Tahir". It may refer to the following people:

- Benjamin Tahirović (born 2003), Bosnian footballer
- Denis Tahirović (born 1985), Croatian footballer
- Emil Tahirovič (born 1979), Slovenian swimmer
- Emra Tahirović (born 1987), Bosnian-Swedish footballer
- Enid Tahirović (born 1972), Bosnian handball player
- Haris Tahirović (born 1981), Bosnian footballer
- Hedina Tahirović-Sijerčić (born 1960), Bosnian Gurbeti Romani journalist, broadcaster, writer, translator, linguistic researcher and teacher
- Nesim Tahirović (1941–2020), Bosnian painter

== See also ==
- Nameštaj Tahirović, Serbian furniture company
