= Ahmetović =

Ahmetović (Serbo-Croatian pronunciation: [axměːtoʋitɕ]) is a predominantly Bosniak surname, a patronymic derived from the given name Ahmet. Notable people with the surname include:

- Adis Ahmetovic (born 1993), German politician of Bosnian descent
- Denial Ahmetović (born 1995), Bosnian singer
- Esmir Ahmetović (born 1991), Bosnian footballer
- Lutvo Ahmetović (1914–2007), Yugoslav freedom fighter and politician
- Mersudin Ahmetović (born 1985), Bosnian footballer

== See also ==
- Ahmedovski
- Ahmić
