= Stoica =

Stoica is a Romanian surname. Notable people with the surname include:

- Adrian Stoica, dog trainer and America's Got Talent winner
- Alin Stoica, footballer
- Andrei Stoica, kickboxer
- Bogdan Stoica, kickboxer
- Chivu Stoica, communist politician, former Prime Minister of Romania
- Constantin T. Stoika, poet
- Cristian Stoica, rugby footballer
- Dorel Stoica, footballer
- Ioan Stoica, aviator
- Ion Stoica, computer scientist
- Laura Stoica, pop singer
- Mihai Stoica, soccer manager
- Peter Stoica, researcher and educator
- Petre Stoica, poet
- Pompiliu Stoica, footballer
- Ștefan Stoica (footballer), footballer and manager
- Ștefan Stoica (politician), politician
- Tudorel Stoica, footballer
- Valeriu Stoica, politician
- Vasile Stoica, diplomat and politician

== See also ==
- Stoica Lascu, historian
