= Jokinen =

Jokinen is a Finnish surname of Virtanen type derived from the word joki. Notable people with the surname include:

- Aimo Jokinen (1931–2024), Finnish cyclist
- Alma Jokinen (1882–1939), Finnish politician
- Antti Jokinen (born 1968), Finnish music video and film director
- Erja Jokinen (born 1979), Finnish ski-orienteering competitor
- Esa Jokinen (born 1958), Finnish decathlete
- Ilona Jokinen (born 1981), Finnish soprano opera singer
- Jaakko Jokinen (born 1993), Finnish ice hockey player
- Jarno Jokinen (born 1978), Finnish strongman
- Johan Jokinen (born 1990), Danish racing driver
- Jouko Jokinen (1936–2024), Finnish speed skater
- Juho Jokinen (born 1986), Finnish ice hockey defenseman
- Jussi Jokinen (born 1983), Finnish hockey player, left wing
- Kalle Jokinen (1900–1965), Finnish farm hand, lumberjack, sailor and politician
- Kalle Jokinen (born 1961), Finnish politician
- Matti Jokinen (footballer) (1928–1999), Finnish footballer
- Matti Jokinen (1936–2004), Finnish sailor
- Olli Jokinen (born 1978), Finnish hockey player, centre
- Raija Jokinen (born 1960), Finnish visual artist and textile designer
- Seppo Jokinen (born 1949), Finnish writer
- Titta Jokinen (born 1951), Finnish actress
- Tommi Jokinen (born 1988), Finnish ice hockey player
- Väinö E. Jokinen (1879–1920), Finnish journalist and MP
- Valtteri Jokinen (born 1983), Finnish judoka
- Vesa Jokinen (born 1970), Finnish singer
