= Ebner =

Ebner is a Germanic surname. Notable people with the surname include:

- Adalbert Ebner (1851–1898), German Catholic clergyman and liturgiologist
- Annemarie Ebner, Austrian luger
- Christina Ebner (1277–1356), German nun and writer
- Ede Virág-Ébner (1912–1951), a Hungarian wrestler
- Ferdinand Ebner (1882–1931), Austrian philosopher
- Franklin E. Ebner (1904–1979), American lawyer and politician
- Harald Ebner (born 1964), German politician
- Hieronymus Wilhelm Ebner von Eschenbach (1673–1752), German diplomat, historian, and scholar
- Klaus Ebner (born 1964), Austrian writer, essayist, poet, and translator
- Lola Beer Ebner (1910–1997), Israeli fashion designer
- Margareta Ebner (1291–1351), German mystic and visionary
- Marie von Ebner-Eschenbach (1830–1916), Austrian writer
- Mark Ebner (born 1959), American investigative journalist
- Martin Ebner (born 1945), Swiss billionaire businessman
- Michl Ebner (born 1952), Italian politician
- Nate Ebner (born 1988), American football and rugby player
- Thomas Ebner, Austrian footballer
- Thomas Ebner (athlete), Austrian athlete
- Trestan Ebner (born 1999), American football player
- Victor von Ebner (1842–1925), Austrian anatomist and histologist
- Ebner- in San Antonio Fire Department is a term for working Overtime whenever you want
