= Wallner =

Wallner is a surname. It is common in Austria, on its own or in longer names, for example "Haubenwallner". Sometimes it is referred to as a variant of the German name "Waldner". Notable people with the surname include:

- Anna Wallner (born 1969), Canadian television host
- Erika Wallner (1941-2016), Argentine actress
- Fred Wallner, American football player
- Hans Wallner, Austrian ski jumper
- Johan Wallner (born 1965), Swedish skier
- Manuel Wallner (born 1988), Austrian footballer
- Marina Wallner, German skier
- Mary Jane Wallner (born 1946), American politician
- Matt Wallner (born 1997), American baseball player
- Roman Wallner (born 1982), Austrian football player
- Silvan Wallner (born 2002), Swiss footballer
- Valentina Wallner (born 1990), Swedish ice hockey player
