= Jovanovski =

Jovanovski (Macedonian: Јовановски) is a common Macedonian surname. It derives from Jovan, which is equivalent to John in English. The -ov suffix is a possessive/patronymic and the -ski suffix is a general surname former. Jovanovski thus means "son of John" and is comparable to Johnson in English. The name may refer to:

- Bojana Jovanovski (born 1991), Serbian tennis player
- Ed Jovanovski (born 1976), Canadian hockey player of Macedonian descent
- Gjore Jovanovski (born 1956), Macedonian footballer and manager
- Marko Jovanovski, Macedonian footballer
- Meto Jovanovski (1946–2023), Macedonian actor
- Meto Jovanovski (1928–2016), Macedonian writer
- Vlado Jovanovski (born 1967), Macedonian actor
- Zoran Jovanovski (born 1972), Macedonian footballer

== See also ==
- Jovanović, Serbian equivalent
