= Mehmeti =

Mehmeti (also spelled Mehmedi) is a surname. Notable people with the surname include:

- Admir Mehmedi (born 1991), Swiss footballer
- Adri Mehmeti (born 2009), American soccer player
- Agon Mehmeti (born 1989), Swedish footballer
- Anis Mehmeti (born 2001), Albanian-English footballer
- Artan Mehmeti (born 1975), Kosovan former basketball player
- Din Mehmeti (1932–2010), Albanian poet
- Dritan Mehmeti (born 1980), Albanian footballer and manager
- Edmir Mehmeti (born 2001), Swedish politician
- Genc Mehmeti (born 1980), Swiss footballer
- Jehona Mehmeti (born 1990), Swiss football midfielder
- Ksement Mehmeti (born 1998), Albanian footballer
- Nazmi Mehmeti (1918–1995), Albanian religious leader
- Xhuljo Mehmeti (born 1993), Albanian footballer
