= Guțu =

Guțu is a surname. It derives from a shortening of the name Neguțu. Notable people with the surname include:

- Ana Guțu (born 1962), Moldovan politician
- Andrei Guțu (born 1980), Moldovan-Romanian weightlifter
- George Guțu (born 1944), Romanian philologist
- Ion Guțu (born 1943), Moldovan politician
- Lidia Guțu (born 1954), Moldovan politician
- Octavian Guțu (born 1982), Moldovan swimmer
- Tatiana Guțu (born 1976), Ukrainian artistic gymnast

== See also ==
- Anna Gutu (died 2023), Ukrainian-American mountain climber
- Archford Gutu (born 1993), Zimbabwean footballer
- Gutu (senatorial constituency), Senatorial constituency in the Senate of Zimbabwe
- Gutu District, District in Masvingo, Zimbabwe
- Waqo Gutu (1924–2006), Ethiopian rebel and Oromo nationalist
