= Gjoka =

Gjoka is an Albanian surname. Notable people with the surname include:

- Ernest Gjoka (born 1970), Albanian football coach
- Lola Gjoka (1910–1985), Albanian pianist
- Pjetër Gjoka (1912–1982), Albanian film and theatre actor
- Renis Gjoka (born 1987), Albanian singer and songwriter
- Sokol Gjoka, Albanian diplomat
