= Hribar =

Hribar is a Slovene surname. Notable people with the surname include:

- Ivan Hribar (1851–1941), Slovenian banker, politician, diplomat and journalist
- Sašo Hribar (1960–2023), Slovenian radio and television personality, comedian
- Spomenka Hribar (born 1941), Slovenian philosopher and writer
- Tine Hribar (born 1941), Slovenian philosopher
- Vida Jeraj Hribar (1902–2002), Slovenian classical violinist
