= Košir =

Košir, sometimes Germanized Koschier, is a Slovenian surname. Notable people with the surname include:

- Dejan Košir (born 1973), Slovenian snowboarder
- Jure Košir (born 1972), Slovenian alpine skier
- Lovrenc Košir (1804–1879), Austrian civil servant
- Manca Košir (born 1948), Slovenian journalist and actress
- Nick Kosir, American meteorologist
- Žan Košir (born 1984), Slovenian snowboarder
- Giuseppe Koschier (1936–2021), Austrian footballer
