= Rusu (surname) =

Rusu is a common Moldavian and Romanian surname. Notable people with the surname include:

- Adrian Rusu (born 1984), Romanian football player
- Adrian Andrei Rusu (born 1951), Romanian archeologist
- Alexandru Rusu (1884–1963), Romanian bishop of the Greek-Catholic Church
- Bogdan Rusu (born 1990), Romanian football player
- Denis Rusu (born 1990), Moldovan football goalkeeper
- Emil Rusu (born 1946), Romanian cyclist
- Jason Rusu (born 1969), Canadian sprint canoer
- Marius Rusu (born 1990), Romanian football player
- Mirela Rusu (born 1978), Romanian aerobic gymnast
- Răzvan Rusu (born 1988), Romanian weightlifter
- Ștefan Rusu (born 1956), Romanian wrestler
- Svetlana Rusu (born 1972), Moldovan politician
- Victor Rusu (born 1953), Moldovan politician, journalist and activist
- Vlad Rusu (born 1990), Romanian football player
