= Erdoğan (name) =

Erdoğan (Turkish pronunciation: [ˈæɾdoan]) is a Turkish name and surname meaning "who is born as a brave man, soldier or warrior", "brave, warrior falcon", or "fighter". Notable people with the name include:

== Given name ==
- Erdoğan Arıca (1954–2012), Turkish football manager
- Erdoğan Atalay (born 1966), Turkish-German actor
- Erdoğan Aygan (born 1979), Turkish Paralympian archer
- Erdoğan Bayraktar (born 1948), Turkish politician
- Erdoğan Büyükkasap (1962–2010), Turkish scientist and academic
- Erdoğan Kaya (born 2001), Turkish footballer
- Erdoğan Teziç (1936–2017), Turkish academic in constitutional law
- Erdoğan Toprak (born 1961), Turkish businessman and politician
- Erdoğan Yeşilyurt (born 1993), Turkish-German footballer

== Surname ==
- Ahmet Burak Erdoğan (born 1979), a son of Turkish President Recep Tayyip Erdoğan
- Aslı Erdoğan (born 1967), Turkish novelist
- Azize Erdoğan (born 1996), Turkish women's footballer
- Bilal Erdoğan (born 1981), a son of Turkish President Recep Tayyip Erdoğan
- Derin Erdoğan (born 2002), Turkish female basketball player
- Emine Erdoğan (born 1955), wife of Turkish President Recep Tayyip Erdoğan
- Emrah Erdoğan, Turkish singer and actor
- Enver Erdogan, Australian politician
- Fazıl Erdoğan (1925–2015), a professor emeritus of mechanical engineering and mechanics and dean emeritus of the college of engineering at Lehigh University
- İsyan Erdogan (born 1982), Australian footballer
- Kayacan Erdoğan (born 1988), Turkish footballer
- Mert Erdoğan (born 1989), Turkish footballer
- Meryem Erdoğan (born 1990), Ethiopian-born Turkish long-distance runner
- Murat Erdoğan (born 1976), Turkish footballer
- Nehir Erdoğan (born 1980), Turkish actress
- Ömer Erdoğan (born 1977), Turkish footballer
- Recep Tayyip Erdoğan (born 1954), President of Turkey
- Serkan Erdoğan (born 1978), Turkish basketballer
- Uğur Erdoğan (born 1987), Turkish footballer
- Yılmaz Erdoğan (born 1967), Turkish film director
- Özdemir Erdoğan (born 1940), Turkish singer-songwriter and author

== See also ==
- Erdoğan, Kestel
- Ka-50-2 "Erdogan"
