= Højgaard =

Højgaard is a Danish language surname, which means "high farm" or "high garden", derived from the Danish words høj ("high") and gaard or gård (meaning "garden" or "farm"). The name may refer to:

- Else Højgaard (1906–1979), Danish ballerina and actress
- Hans Jacob Højgaard (1904–1992), Faroese composer
- Kári P. Højgaard (born 1951), Faroese politician
- Knud Højgaard (1878–1968), Danish businessman
- Nicolai Højgaard (born 2001), Danish golfer
- Rasmus Højgaard (born 2001), Danish golfer
