= Korkmaz =

Korkmaz is a Turkish name and surname that means fearless. It's a traditional name encountered in Anatolia since the 16th century. Notable people with the surname include:

== People ==
- Salih Korkmaz (born 1 January 1997) is a Turkish racewalking athlete
- Bülent Korkmaz (born 1968), Turkish footballer and coach
- Bülent Korkmaz (archer) (born 1975), Turkish Paralympian archer
- Can Korkmaz (born 1992), Turkish basketball player
- Çağla Korkmaz (born 1990), Turkish-German women's footballer
- Egemen Korkmaz (born 1982), Turkish footballer
- Elvan Korkmaz (born 1985), German politician
- Emre Korkmaz (born 1986), Turkish actor.
- Ferhat Korkmaz (born 1981), Swedish-born Turkish footballer
- Furkan Korkmaz (born 1997), Turkish basketball player
- Inessa Korkmaz (born 1972), Russian-Azerbaijani volleyball player
- Mahsum Korkmaz (1956–1986), Commander of the Kurdistan Workers' Party (PKK)'s guerilla forces
- Mert Korkmaz (born 1971), Turkish footballer
- Mustafa Korkmaz (born 1988), Dutch wheelchair basketball player of Turkish descent
- Ümit Korkmaz (born 1985), Austrian footballer of Turkish descent
- Zeki Korkmaz (born 1988), Turkish footballer
- Zeynep Korkmaz (1921–2025), Turkish scholar and dialectologist
