= Vītols =

Origin
- Origin: Latvian
- Meaning: "willow"

Vītols (Old orthography: Wihtol(s); feminine: Vītola) is a Latvian topographic surname, derived from the Latvian word for "willow". Individuals with the surname include:

- Aigars Vītols (born 1976), Latvian basketball player
- Elīna Ieva Vītola (born 2000), Latvian luger
- Jāzeps Vītols (1863–1948), Latvian composer
- Kristīne Vītola (born 1991), Latvian basketball player
- Rūdolfs Vītols (died 1942), Latvian middle-distance runner

== See also ==
- Vītoliņš
