= Fjeldsted =

Fjeldsted is a surname. Notable people with the surname include:

- Christian D. Fjeldsted (1829–1905), Danish general authority of the Church of Jesus Christ of Latter-day Saints
- Katrín Fjeldsted (born 1946), Icelandic politician and medical doctor
- Thorkild Fjeldsted (1740–1796), Icelandic lawyer
