= Petrovski =

Petrovski (Macedonian: Петровски) is a Macedonian surname meaning 'grandson of Petar'. Notable people with the surname include:

- Filip Petrovski (born 1972), Macedonian political activist
- Pande Petrovski (1943–2006), Macedonian military figure
- Sasho Petrovski (born 1975), Australian footballer
- Vladimir Petrovski (fl. 1970s–1980s), Macedonian musician also known as Karter
