= Juhász =

Juhász or Juhás is a Hungarian-language family name meaning literally 'shepherd', which may be anglicized to Yuhas. Notable people with the name include:

== Juhász or Juhás ==
=== A ===
- Ádám Juhász (born 1996), Hungarian handballer
- Adrián Juhász (born 1989), Hungarian rower
- Attila Juhász (born 1967) (born 1967), Serbian politician from the Hungarian community of Vojvodina
- Attila Juhász (born 1976) (born 1976), Serbian politician from the Hungarian community of Vojvodina

=== B ===
- Béla Juhász (1921–2002), Hungarian long-distance runner

=== D ===
- Dániel Juhász (born 1992), Hungarian football player
- Dorka Juhász (born 1999), Hungarian professional basketball player

=== E ===
- Eszter Juhász (born 1988), Finnish curler, born in Hungary

=== F ===
- Ferenc Juhász (poet) (1928–2015), Hungarian poet
- Ferenc Juhász (politician) (born 1960), Minister of Defense for Hungary from 2002 to 2006

=== G ===
- Gábor Juhász (born 1963), Hungarian politician
- Gabriella Juhász (born 1985), Hungarian handballer
- Gusztáv Juhász (1911–2003), Romanian footballer and coach
- Gyula Juhász (poet) (1883–1937), Hungarian poet
- Gyula Juhász (sculptor) (1876–1913), Hungarian sculptor and medallist
- Gyula Juhász (historian) (1930–1993), Hungarian historian

=== H ===
- Hajnalka Juhász (born 1980), Hungarian lawyer and political scientist

=== I ===
- Ildikó Juhász (born 1953), Hungarian hospitality worker and lesbian activist
- István Juhász (boxer) (born 1931), Hungarian boxer
- István Juhász (mathematician) (born 1943), Hungarian mathematician
- István Juhász (footballer) (1945–2024), Hungarian football midfielder
- István Juhász (canoeist) (born 2005), Hungarian canoeist

=== J ===
- József Juhász (1908–1974), Hungarian stage and film actor

=== K ===
- Katalin Juhász (born 1932), Hungarian foil fencer

=== M ===
- Marián Juhás (born 1979), Slovak footballer
- Miloš Juhász (born 1984), Slovak football midfielder
- Mónika Juhász Miczura (born 1972), Hungarian singer

=== P ===
- Péter Juhász (1948–2024), Hungarian football defender
- Péter Melius Juhász (1532–1572), Hungarian botanist, writer, theologian, Calvinist bishop

=== R ===
- Roland Juhász (born 1983), Hungarian footballer

=== S ===
- Sándor Juhász Nagy (1883–1946), Hungarian politician

=== V ===
- Vanda Juhász (born 1989), Hungarian javelin thrower

== Juhasz ==
- Antonia Juhasz (born 1970), American author and political activist
- Mike Juhasz (born 1976), Canadian Football League player
- Tunde Juhasz (born 1969), Australian cricket player
- William Juhasz (1899–1967), Hungarian-American author, cultural and religious historian

== Juhas ==
- Mary C. Juhas (born 1955), American engineer working in materials science

== Yuhas ==
- John Edward "Eddie" Yuhas (1924–1986), American baseball pitcher
- Joseph Yuhas (born 1956), American politician
- Steve Yuhas (born 1973), American conservative radio personality
