= Engjëll Berisha =

Albanian painter

Engjëll Berisha, also known as Befre, was a Kosovar painter from Kosovo.

Berisha was a member of the Academy of Figurative Arts of Kosovo. Some of his paintings adorn the National Library of Kosovo and the library of the University of Pristina.

Berisha died on 15 September 2010.

== Works ==
- Dardan Gate
- Tower of Dukagjini
- Symbols
