= Hasanović =

Hasanović is a Bosnian surname derived from the Arabic name Hasan and means "son of Hasan". Notable people with the surname include:

- Ahmed Hasanović (born 2000), Bosnian footballer
- Eldar Hasanović (born 1990), Bosnian footballer
- Esad Hasanović (born 1985), Serbian cyclist
- Mirza Hasanović (born 1990), Bosnian footballer
- Nihad Hasanović (born 1974), Bosnian writer and translator
