= Mlaka =

Mlaka may refer to:

In Croatia:

- Mlaka, Sisak-Moslavina County, a village near Jasenovac
- Mlaka, Zagreb County, a village near Rakovec
- Mlaka, Rijeka, a section of Rijeka
- Velika Mlaka, a village near Velika Gorica
- Mala Mlaka, a village near the City of Zagreb

In Slovenia:

- Čučja Mlaka, a settlement in the Municipality of Škocjan
- Mlaka nad Lušo, a settlement in the Municipality of Gorenja Vas–Poljane
- Mlaka pri Kočevju, a settlement in the Municipality of Kočevje
- Mlaka pri Kočevski Reki, a settlement in the Municipality of Kočevje
- Mlaka pri Kranju, a settlement in the Municipality of Kranj
- Mlaka, Radovljica, a settlement in the Municipality of Radovljica
- Mlaka, Komenda, a settlement in the Municipality of Komenda
- Tunjiška Mlaka, a settlement in the Municipality of Kamnik
