= Potočnik =

Potočnik is seventh most frequent surname in Slovenia. It is most common in the northern and eastern regions of the country, while it is almost nonexistent in the west and south. It may refer to:

- Herman Potočnik (1892–1929), Slovene rocket engineer and pioneer of astronautics
- Janez Potočnik (1749–1834), Baroque painter
- Janez Potočnik (born 1958), Slovenian politician
