= Kastelic =

Kastelic is a Slovenian surname. Notable people with the surname include:

- Andrej Kastelic (born 1971), Slovenian handball player
- Ed Kastelic (born 1964), Canadian ice hockey player
- Janko Kastelic (born 1969), Canadian-Slovenian conductor
- Mark Kastelic (born 1999), American ice hockey player
- Mark Kastelic (racing driver) (born 2007), Slovenian racing driver
