= Papoutsis =

Papoutsis is a Greek surname. Greek: παπουτσής literally means "shoemaker". Notable people with the surname include:

- Christos Papoutsis (born 1953), Greek politician
- Dimitris K. Papoutsis
- Konstantinos Papoutsis (born 1979), Greek footballer
- Yianni Papoutsis, British restaurateur
