= Ferhatović =

Ferhatović or Ferhatovic is a surname. Notable people with the surname include:

- Amar Ferhatović (born 1977), Bosnian footballer
- Asim Ferhatović (1933–1987), professional footballer
- Nidal Ferhatovic (born 1980), Bosnian footballer (striker)
- Nijaz Ferhatović (born 1955), Bosnian defender

== See also ==
- Asim Ferhatović Hase Stadium, stadium owned by the city of Sarajevo
