= Ristovski =

Ristovski is a surname that has Macedonian origin. The form of the surname Ristovski is for males, while Ristovska is for females. Notable people with the surname include:

- Blaže Ristovski, Macedonian literary historian
- Borko Ristovski, Macedonian handball player
- Dejan Ristovski, Macedonian footballer
- Filip Ristovski, Macedonian footballer
- Laza Ristovski, Serbian musician
- Lazar Ristovski, Serbian actor
- Ljubomir Ristovski, Serbian football manager and player
- Mendo Ristovski, Australian footballer
- Stefan Ristovski (footballer, born February 1992), Macedonian footballer
- Stefan Ristovski (footballer, born December 1992), Macedonian footballer
- Svetozar Ristovski, Macedonian film director
