= Ademović =

Ademović is a predominantly Bosniak surname, derived from the Ottoman Turkish Adem, which is both a personal name ("Adam") and a word meaning "man" both of which are derived from Arabic. Notable people with the surname include:

- Ahmed Ademović (1873–1965), Serbian trumpeter
- Alen Ademović, former member of Serbian pop band Miligram
- Edin Ademović (born 1987), Serbian-Bosnian footballer

== See also ==
- Adamović
