= Ravelli =

Ravelli is a surname of Italian origin. Notable people with the surname include:

- Andreas Ravelli (born 1959), Swedish footballer
- Diego Giovanni Ravelli (born 1965), Italian priest
- Louise Ravelli (born 1963), Australian linguist
- Thomas Ravelli (born 1959), Swedish footballer

== Fictional characters ==
- Emmanuel Ravelli, a character played by Chico Marx
