= Brahimi =

Brahimi is a surname. Notable people with the surname include:

- Abdelhamid Brahimi (1936–2021), Algerian politician and Prime Minister
- Belkacem Brahimi (born 1994), Algerian footballer
- Bilal Brahimi (born 2000), French-Moroccan footballer
- Billal Brahimi (born 2000), Algerian and French footballer
- Farès Brahimi (born 1988), Algerian footballer
- Guillaume Brahimi (born 1967), French-born chef based in Sydney, Australia
- Lakhdar Brahimi (born 1934), chairman of a United Nations panel
  - Report of the Panel on United Nations Peacekeeping, more commonly referred to as the Brahimi Report, after the above chairman
- Mahfoud Brahimi (born 1985), Algerian middle-distance runner
- Mërgim Brahimi (born 1992), Kosovan footballer
- Mohamed Brahimi (disambiguation), multiple people
- Said Brahimi (1931–1997), Algerian-born French international footballer
- Samir Brahimi (born 1990), Algerian boxer
- Yacine Brahimi (born 1990), French-Algerian football player
- Freeman (rapper), real name Malek Brahimi, French rapper
- Princess Rym, real name Rym Brahimi, daughter of Lakhdar Brahimi, wife of Prince Ali bin Al Hussein of Jordan
