= Kavčič =

Kavčič is a surname. Notable people with the surname include:

- Blaž Kavčič (born 1987), Slovenian tennis player
- Blaž Kavčič (politician) (born 1951), Slovenian politician and economist
- Stane Kavčič (1919–1987), Slovenian politician
- Tine Kavčič (born 1994), Slovenian footballer
- Tomaž Kavčič (born 1953), Slovenian footballer and manager
