= Hasan Abazi =

Kosovo Albanian trade unionist

- Born: c. 1945 (age 80–81)
- Occupation: trade unionist
- Organization: Kosovo Metalworkers Union
- Known for: MP in Kosovo Parliament, organizer of anticommunist demonstration in 1968, 2012 arrest by Serbia

Hasan Abazi (born c. 1945) is a Kosovo Albanian trade unionist and the president of the Kosovo Metalworkers Union. He was arrested in Serbia on 28 March 2022 for "crimes against [the] constitution and security of Republic of Serbia". According to Serbian Interior Minister Ivica Dačić, the arrest was made in "retaliation" for the arrests of four Kosovo Serbs the previous day.

== Background ==
In the 1990s, Abazi was active in pre-independence Kosovo politics, twice serving in the parliament formed by Ibrahim Rugova as a "parallel" to the Serbian Parliament. Abazi is a trade unionist and currently serves as the president of the Kosovo Metalworkers Union.

== March 2012 arrest ==
On 27 March 2012, four Kosovo Serbs, including the mayor of Vitina, were arrested while attempting to cross the Kosovo-Serbia border at Bela Zemlja with campaign materials for an upcoming election. They were subsequently charged with "incitement to hatred and intolerance among ethnic groups".

The following day, trade Abazi was arrested with fellow unionist Izet Mustafa who was released immediately by Serbian border police at a crossing near Gnjilane, Kosovo. Abazi was charged with espionage and Dačić stated of the arrests that "Serbian police did not wish to take this approach, but the situation obviously could no longer go on without retaliation... If someone wants to compete in arrests, we have the answer". According to his lawyer, Abazi was then held in solitary confinement.

Amnesty International responded to the charges by calling for Abazi's release, stating that "people’s individual liberty cannot be put at risk as a bargaining chip in a political dispute between Serbia and Kosovo". Human Rights Watch described it as an "arbitrary" arrest and also called for Abazi and Urseli's release. Members of the European Parliament Eduard Kukan and Jelko Kacin sent a joint letter to Serbian Prime Minister Mirko Cvetković protesting Abazi's detention and stating "great concern about the independence of state institutions and rule of law in Serbia".

On 30 March, the Serbian High Court in Vranje ordered Abazi to be detained for thirty days on espionage charges dating to a 1999 incident in which Abazi allegedly gave information to NATO.
