= Peter Baláž =

Peter Baláž may refer to:

- Peter Baláž (Esperantist) (born 1979), Slovak Esperantist and editor
- Peter Baláž (boxer) (born 1974), Slovak boxer
