= Suljić =

Suljić is a Bosniak surname. Notable people with the surname include:

- Ali Suljić (born 1997), Swedish footballer of Bosnian descent
- Amir Suljić (born 1989), Bosnian-born Swedish footballer
- Asmir Suljić (born 1991), Bosnian footballer
- Ćazim Suljić (born 1996), French-born Bosnian footballer
- Sunny Suljic (born 2005), American child actor and skateboarder
