= Bizjak =

Bizjak may refer to:

- Boris Bizjak (born 1981), London-based Slovenian flautist
- Julijana Bizjak Mlakar, Slovenian politician
- Jurij Bizjak (born 1947), Slovenian Roman Catholic prelate
- Lidija Bizjak (born 1976), Serbian concert pianist
- Lovro Bizjak (born 1993), Slovenian footballer
- Sanja Bizjak (born 1988), Serbian pianist
