= Murati (surname) =

Murati is an Albanian surname. Notable people with the surname include:

- Agim Murati (1953–2005), Albanian footballer
- Aljmir Murati (born 1985), Swiss footballer
- Edvin Murati (born 1975), Albanian former footballer
- Emir Murati (born 2000), Italian footballer
- Enis Murati (born 1988), Kosovan-Austrian basketball player
- Eva Murati (born 1995), Albanian actress and TV host
- Hekuran Murati (born 1987), Kosovar Albanian economist and politician
- Lili Muráti (1914–2003), Hungarian actress
- Mevlan Murati (born 1994), Macedonian footballer
- Mira Murati (born 1988), Albanian engineer, researcher, and tech executive
- Xheladin Murati (born 1942), Albanian pedagogist and politician
