= Kotnik =

Kotnik is a Slovenian surname. Notable people with the surname include:

- Andrej Kotnik (born 1995), Slovenian footballer
- Ciril Kotnik (1895–1948), Yugoslav diplomat
- Gloria Kotnik (born 1989), Slovenian snowboarder
- Matic Kotnik (born 1990), Slovenian footballer
- Renato Kotnik (born 1970), Slovenian footballer
- Slavko Kotnik (born 1962), Yugoslav-Slovenian basketball player
- Stanko Kotnik (1928–2004), Slovenian academic and editor
