= Kvaran =

Kvaran is a surname. Notable people with the surname include:

- Brynjar Kvaran (born 1958), Icelandic handball player
- Einar Hjörleifsson Kvaran (1859–1938), Icelandic editor, novelist, poet, playwright and spiritualist
- Einar Ragnarsson Kvaran (1920–2012), Icelandic engineer, teacher, genealogist and writer
- Gunnar Kvaran (born 1944), Icelandic cellist
- Karl Kvaran (1924–1989), Icelandic painter and draughtsman
