= Shehu =

Shehu may refer to:

- Abdullahi Shehu (born 1963), Nigerian academician and diplomat
- Ajet Shehu (born 1990), English footballer
- Aqif Shehu, Kosovan former politician and former footballer
- Arben Shehu (born 1967), Albanian footballer
- Bashkim Shehu (born 1955), Albanian writer
- Bello Shehu (born 1958), Nigerian academician and neurosurgeon
- Bujar Shehu (born 1939), Albanian basketball coach
- Emiljano Shehu (born 1998), Albanian footballer
- Enkelejda Shehu (born 1969), Albanian shooter
- Enver Shehu (1934–2009), Albanian football player and manager
- Feçor Shehu (1926–1983), Albanian politician
- Fiqrete Shehu (1919–1988), Albanian politician
- Florent Shehu (born 2002), Croatian football midfielder
- Garba Shehu (born 1959), Nigerian journalist and politician
- Hadi Shehu (1949–2017), Kosovar-Albanian stage and film actor
- Hussain Hassan Shehu (born 1978), Nigerian politician
- Juljan Shehu (born 1998), Albanian footballer
- Kristo Shehu (born 2000), Greek footballer
- Lawal Shehu (born 1985), Nigerian professional tennis player
- Mefail Shehu (1898–1945), Albanian military commander and leader of the Kicevo region
- Mehmet Shehu (1913–1981), Albanian communist politician
- Mustafa Shehu, Nigerian electrical engineer and 17th president of the World Federation of Engineering Organizations
- Ramadan Shehu (born 1948), Albanian football coach and director
- Sherefedin Shehu, Albanian politician
- Tritan Shehu (born 1949), member of the Assembly of the Republic of Albania
- Umaru Shehu (1930–2023), Nigerian physician and academic administrator
- Ylli Shehu (born 1966), Albanian footballer
- Ylli Vesel Shehu (born 1981), Albanian politician
- The title of a ruler of the Borno Emirate, Nigeria
- The title of a ruler of the Dikwa Emirate, Nigeria
- Shehu Shagari, 6th President of Nigeria (1925–2018)
- Shehu Musa Yar'Adua, 4th De facto vice president of Nigeria, (1943–1997)

== See also ==
- Sheikh
