= Briem =

Briem is an Icelandic and German surname. Notable people with the surname include:

- Alexandra Briem (born 1983), Icelandic politician
- Anita Briem (born 1982), Icelandic actress and screenwriter
- Elín Briem (1856–1937), Icelandic teacher and author
- Halldóra Briem (1913–1993), Icelandic architect
- Helen Briem (born 2005), German golfer
- Helgi Pálson Briem (1902–1981), Icelandic diplomat
- Herbert Briem (born 1957), German soccer player and trainer
- Ray Briem (1930–2012), American radio personality
- Valdimar Briem (1848–1930), Icelandic poet
- Wunibald Briem (1841–1912), Austrian composer
