= Adilović =

Adilović is a Bosniak surname meaning "son of Adil". Notable people with the surname include:

- Adi Adilović (born 1983), Bosnia and Herzegovina footballer
- Edmir Adilovic (born 1986), Austrian footballer
- Eldin Adilović (born 1986), Bosnia and Herzegovina footballer
