= Oravec =

Oravec (Czech and Slovak feminine: Oravcová) is a surname. It means native of Orava in Czech and Slovak. Notable people with the surname include:

- Ján Oravec (born 1964), Slovak economist
- Marek Oravec (born 1983), Austrian actor
- Matej Oravec (born 1998), Slovak footballer
- Roman Oravec (born 1978), Czech athlete
- Tomáš Oravec (born 1980), Slovak footballer
