= Salihović =

Salihović is a Bosniak surname meaning "son of Salih". Notable people with the surname include:

- Admir Salihović (born 1989), Bosnian footballer
- Eldar Salihović (born 1999), Montenegrin alpine skier
- Fuad Salihović (born 1985), Serbian footballer
- Jasmin Salihović (born 1980), Bosnian retired middle-distance runner
- Sejad Salihović (born 1984), Bosnian footballer
- Zada Salihović (born 2000), German politician of Serbian descent
