= Përmeti (name) =

Përmeti is an Albanian surname.

- Aqif Përmeti (1884–1945), Albanian military officer and politician
- Mentor Përmeti (1920–2015), Albanian agronomist
- Turhan Përmeti (1846–1927), Albanian politician and statesman
