= Kolla =

Kolla is a surname. Notable people with the surname include:

- Ilmi Kolla (1933–1954), Estonian poet
- Kathy Kolla, American director, screenwriter, and actress
- Patrick Michael Kolla, German software engineer
