= Hysi =

Hysi is an Albanian surname. People with this surname include:

- Kastriot Hysi (born 1958), Albanian footballer
- Vasilika Hysi (born 1963), Albanian politician, jurist and diplomat
