= Cojocari =

Cojocari is a Moldovan surname. Notable people with the surname include:

- Andrei Cojocari (born 1987), Moldovan footballer
- Serafim Cojocari (born 2001), Moldovan footballer
- Sergiu Cojocari (born 1988), Moldovan footballer
