= Shabani, Iran =

Shabani شعباني
- Village
- Location within Iran
- Coordinates: 35°22′09″N 47°22′06″E
- Country: Iran
- Province: Kurdistan
- County: Dehgolan
- Bakhsh: Central
- Rural District: Quri Chay

Population (2006)
  - Total: 218
- Time zone: UTC+3:30 (IRST)
  - Summer (DST): UTC+4:30 (IRDT)

Shabani (Persian: شعباني, also Romanized as Sha‘bānī) is a village in Quri Chay Rural District, in the Central District of Dehgolan County, Kurdistan Province, Iran. At the 2006 census, its population was 218, in 47 families. The village is populated by Kurds.
