= Majerus =

Majerus or Majérus is a surname. Notable people with the surname include:

- Christine Majerus (born 1987), Luxembourgish cyclist
- Jacques Majerus (1916–1972), Luxembourgish cyclist
- Jean Majerus (1914–1983), Luxembourgish cyclist
- Jean Majérus (1891–1961), Luxembourgish cyclist
- Marianne Majerus (born 1956), Luxembourgish photographer
- Michael Majerus (1954–2009), English geneticist and entomologist
- Michel Majerus (1967–2002), Luxembourgish artist
- Raymond Majerus (1924–1987), American labor leader; father of Rick
- Rick Majerus (1948–2012), American basketball player and coach; son of Raymond
