= Rebane =

Family name

Rebane is an Estonian surname meaning "fox". Notable people with the surname include:

- Alfons Rebane (1908–1976), Estonian military commander
- Bill Rebane (born 1937), Latvian-born American film director, producer, screenwriter, author
- Hans Rebane (1882–1961), Estonian politician, diplomat, Minister of Foreign Affairs
- Helju Rebane (born 1948), Estonian writer
- Karl Rebane (1926–2007), Estonian physicist
- Ljubov Rebane (1929–1991), Estonian physicist
- Peeter Rebane (born 1973), Estonian film producer, director, entrepreneur
- Raul Rebane (born 1953), Estonian journalist and communication consultant

== See also ==
- Rebana
