= Kļaviņš =

Male given name

Origin
- Origin: Latvian
- Meaning: "maple"

Kļaviņš (feminine: Kļaviņa) is a Latvian masculine surname, derived from the Latvian word for "maple" (kļava). Individuals with the surname include:

- Aldis Kļaviņš (1975–2000), Latvian slalom canoer
- David Klavins (born 1954), Latvian-German piano maker
- Edgars Kļaviņš (born 1993), Latvian ice hockey player
- Jānis Kļaviņš (1933–2008), Latvian chess master
- Olafs Kļaviņš (born 1964), Latvian bobsledder
