= Korošec =

Korošec is a Slovenian surname. Notable people with the surname include:

- Anton Korošec (1872–1940), Slovenian politician
- Igor Korošec, Slovenian-Russian actor
- Kaja Korošec (born 2001), Slovenian footballer
- Miha Korošec (born 1991), Slovenian footballer
- Miroslava Geč Korošec (1939–2002), Slovenian lawyer and judge
- Rok Korošec (born 1993), Slovenian cyclist
