= Schiltz =

Schiltz is a surname. Notable people with the surname include:

- Hugo Schiltz (1927–2006), Belgian lawyer and politician
- Jean-Louis Schiltz (born 1964), Luxembourgian lawyer and politician
- Patrick J. Schiltz (born 1960), American judge
