= Shkodra (name) =

Shkodra is an Albanian surname. People with this surname include:

- Donjet Shkodra (born 1989), Kosovo Albanian footballer
- Haxhi Xhaferr Shkodra (1931–2016), Albanian ulamalu and imam
