= Sawer =

Sawer can refer to:

- Sawer, India, town in the Indian state of Madhya Pradesh
- Sawer, Pakistan, village in the Punjab province of Pakistan
- David Sawer (born 1961), British composer
- Marian Sawer (born 1946), Australian political scientist
