= Ion Popa =

Ion Popa may refer to:

- Ion Popa (1910s politician), member of the Moldovan Parliament (1917–1918)
- Ion Popa (1990s politician), member of the Moldovan Parliament (1990–1994)
- Ion Popa (Romanian politician), member of the Romanian Senate (2012–present), National Liberal Party (Romania)
- Ion Popa (rower), Australian rower
- Ion Popa (historian), contemporary historian
