= Scheving =

Scheving is an Icelandic surname. Notable people with this surname include:

- Auður Sveinbjörnsdóttir Scheving (born 2002), Icelandic football goalkeeper
- Gunnlaugur Scheving (1904–1972), Icelandic painter
- Magnús Scheving (born 1964), Icelandic writer, entrepreneur, producer, actor, and athlete
