= Lechner =

Lechner is a German surname. Notable people with the surname include:

- Alfred James Lechner Jr. (born 1955), American judge
- Anton Lechner (1907–1975), German SS officer
- Auguste Lechner (1905–2000), Austrian writer
- Bernard J. Lechner (1932–2014), American electronics engineer
- Corinna Lechner (born 1994), German cyclist
- Cornelia Lechner (born 1966), German tennis player
- Ed Lechner (1919–2015), American football player
- Elisabeth Adele Allram-Lechner (1824–1861), Czech actress
- Emilio Lechner (born 1940), Italian luger
- Erika Lechner (born 1947), Italian luger
- Eva Lechner (born 1985), Italian cyclist
- Florian Lechner (born 1981), German footballer
- Franco Lechner, known as Bombolo (1931–1987), Italian comedian
- Gustav Lechner (1913–1987), Croatian footballer
- Harald Lechner (born 1982), Austrian football referee
- Heinz Lechner (1928–2020), Austrian fencer
- Johnny Lechner, American actor
- Kerim Lechner (born 1989), Austrian musician
- Kurt Lechner (born 1942), German CDU politician
- Leonhard Lechner (1553–1606), German composer
- Matthias Lechner (born 1970), German set designer
- Maximilian Lechner (born 1990), Austrian pool player
- Natalie Bauer-Lechner (1858–1921), Austrian violist
- Patrick Lechner (born 1988), German cyclist
- Peter Lechner (born 1966), Austrian luger
- Ödön Lechner (1845–1914), Hungarian architect
- Otto Lechner (born 1964), Austrian accordionist
- Robert Lechner (born 1967), German cyclist
- Sebastian Lechner (born 1980), German politician (CDU)
- Walter Lechner (1949–2020), Austrian racing driver

== Other ==
- Mount Lechner, Antarctica
- Lechner (windsurf board)
