= Heilig (surname) =

Heilig is a German family name.

Those with the name include:

- Bernhard Heilig (1902–1943), German economist
- Berthold Heilig (1914–1978), Nazi politician
- Bruno Heilig (1888–1968), Austrian journalist
- Eugen Heilig (1892–1975), photographer, father of Walter Heilig
  - Walter Heilig (1925–2006), East-German photographer (see c:Category:Walter Heilig)
- Franz Xaver Heilig (1826–1888), businessman, mayor and member of Reichstag
- Konrad Heilig (1817–1849), revolutionary in 1848
- Morton Heilig (1926–1997), American cinematographer
- Rosemarie Heilig (born 1956), German Green politician
