= Sahakian =

Sahak Bartev, Isaac of Armenia by Francesco Maggiotto

Sahakian (Armenian: Սահակեան) or Sahakyan (Սահակյան) is a fairly common surname in Armenia originating from the patronymic Armenian equivalent to Isaac. Sahakian translates to Isaacson, Son of Isaac, or descendant of Isaac.

The surname can refer to the following people:

== Sahakian ==
- Barbara Sahakian (born 1952), American-born neuroscientist, based in Cambridge, UK
- Henry D. Sahakian (1937–2021), an Iranian-American businessman, the founder of Uni-Mart
- Jack Sahakian (1931–1995), an American actor
- Mariana Sahakian (born 1977), an Armenian table tennis player
- Oshin Sahakian (born 1986), an Iranian basketball player
- Vahram Sahakian (sometimes as Vahram Sahakyan) (born 1968), Armenian dramatist, film director and actor
- William S. Sahakian (1922–1986), an American philosopher

== Sahakyan ==
- Adam Sahakyan (1996–2016), sergeant of the Armed Forces of Armenia and the Nagorno-Karabakh Defense Army, killed in the Four-Day War
- Anushavan Sahakyan (born 1972), Armenian Freestyle wrestler
- Aramais Sahakyan (1936–2013), an Armenian poet and translator
- Avetik Sahakyan (1863–1933), former Parliamentary President of Armenia
- Bako Sahakyan (born 1960), former president of Artsakh
- Galust Sahakyan (1949–2022), Armenian politician, MP and the former President of the National Assembly of Armenia
- Gevorg Sahakyan (born 1990), Polish Greco-Roman wrestler of Armenian descent
- Kamsar-Kamo Sahakyan (born 1961), an Armenian painter
- Norayr Sahakyan (born 1987), an Armenian football player
- Sahak Sahakyan (1929–2010), an Armenian sculptor, artist and participant in World War II
- Tatshat Sahakyan (1916–1999), an Armenian historian, Armenologist, teacher and professor
- Varvara Sahakyan, an Armenian politician

== Saakian ==
- Sumbat Saakian (1951–1993), a politician in the Government of Abkhazian Autonomous Republic

== Saakyan ==
- Mariya Saakyan (1980–2018), Russian film director

== Ter-Sahakyan ==
- Samvel Ter-Sahakyan (born 1993), Armenian chess grandmaster

== Sahakyants ==
Sahakyants is an archaized form of Sahakyan (as is the case with other Armenian surnames ending with -ts).

- Robert Sahakyants (1950–2009), Armenian animation film director

== See also ==
- Armenian surnames
- Isaac of Armenia
