= Ciobanu (surname) =

Ciobanu is a Romanian surname, common in Romania and Moldova. Notable persons with the surname include:

- Ghenadie Ciobanu (born 1957), Moldovan politician
- Gheorghe Ciobanu (1909–1995), Romanian ethnomusicologist and Byzantine specialist
- Gheorghe Ciobanu (21st century), Moldovan politician
- Ilarion Ciobanu (1931–2008), Romanian actor
- Ion Constantin Ciobanu (1927–2001), Moldovan writer
- Maia Ciobanu (born 1952), Romanian composer
- Mihaela Ciobanu (born 1973), Romanian-Spanish handball player
- Nelly Ciobanu (born 1974), Moldovan singer
- Radu Ciobanu (born 1975), Romanian footballer
- Sebastian Ciobanu (born 1985), Romanian kickboxer
- Ștefan Ciobanu (born 1979), Romanian footballer
- Ștefan Ciobanu (1883–1950), Bessarabian and Romanian politician
- Vitalie Ciobanu (born 1964), Moldovan journalist
- Vladimir Ciobanu (born 1953), Moldovan politician
