= Filip Kaczmarek (footballer) =

Polish footballer

Personal information
- Full name: Filip Kacper Kaczmarek
- Date of birth: 6 January 2007 (age 19)
- Place of birth: Kudowa-Zdrój, Poland
- Positions: Left winger; striker

Team information
- Current team: Loko Prague (on loan from Sparta Prague B)
- Number: 16

Youth career
- –2014: Włókniarz Kudowa-Zdrój
- 2014–2017: Náchod
- 2018–2022: Hradec Králové
- 2023–2025: Sparta Prague

Senior career*
Years	Team	Apps	(Gls)
2025–	Sparta Prague B	9	(0)
2026–	→ Loko Prague (loan)	3	(0)

International career^{‡}
2023	Poland U16	3	(1)
2023	Poland U17	3	(0)
- * Club domestic league appearances and goals as of 19:25, 23 August 2026 (UTC) ‡ National team caps and goals as of 24 May 2026

Filip Kacper Kaczmarek (born 6 January 2007) is a Polish professional footballer who plays as a left winger or striker for Bohemian Football League club Loko Prague, on loan from Sparta Prague B.

Born in the border town of Kudowa-Zdrój, he has spent his career almost solely in the Czech Republic and was considered by their national for a youth call-up. He has represented Poland at under-16 and under-17 levels.
