= Erind Prifti =

Greek-born Albanian footballer

Personal information
- Full name: Erind Prifti
- Date of birth: 27 May 1991 (age 35)
- Place of birth: Larissa, Greece
- Height: 1.83 m (6 ft 0 in)
- Position: Goalkeeper

Team information
- Current team: Apollon Larissa
- Number: 21

Youth career
- 2007–2010: AEL

Senior career*
Years	Team	Apps	(Gls)
2010–2013	AEL	1	(0)
2013	→ AEP Paphos (loan)	7	(0)
2013–2015	Tyrnavos 2005	46	(0)
2015–2016	Chania	18	(0)
2016–2017	Anagennisi Karditsa	22	(0)
2017–2019	Ierapetra	41	(0)
2019–2020	Diagoras Stefanovikeiou	20	(0)
2020–	Apollon Larissa	0	(0)
- * Club domestic league appearances and goals as of 26 August 2020

Erind Prifti (born 27 May 1991) is a Greek-born Albanian professional footballer who plays as a goalkeeper for Super League 2 club Apollon Larissa.

== Club career ==
Prifti played for AEL's U-21 team from 2007 to 2010. In the summer of 2010 he signed a 5-years contract and moved to the first squad. Since then, he managed to play only one game in the 2011–12 Football League against Fokikos.On 30 January 2013 he was given on loan to AEP Paphos till the end of the season.

On 15 September 2019 it was confirmed, that Prifti had joined Diagoras Stefanovikeiou.

== International career ==
In January 2010 Prifti was screened by Albania under-21.
