= Hoxhaj =

Origin
- Language: Albanian via Turkish from Persian
- Meaning: son of the (or little) Hoxha
- Region of origin: Albania

Other names
- See also: Hocaoğlu, Hodžić, Hoxha, Hoca, Hodža

Hoxhaj is an Albanian surname. Its literal meaning is "son of the (or little) hodja", which is similar to that of the Bosnian surname Hodžić and the Turkish family name Hocaoğlu. Notable people with the name include:

- Ardit Hoxhaj (born 1994), Albanian football player
- Enver Hoxhaj (born 1969), Kosovan academic
- Labinot Xhoxhaj (born 1993), Kosovan professional boxer
- Nertil Hoxhaj (born 1997), Albanian footballer
- Petrit Hoxhaj (born 1990), Dutch football player
