= Petrit =

- Gender: Male

Origin
- Region of origin: Albania, Kosovo

Petrit (lit. 'Falcon') is an Albanian masculine given name and can refer to:

- Petrit Ago, General Director of Customs of Albania
- Petrit Bushati (1948–2014), Albanian ambassador
- Petrit Çeku (born 1985), Kosovar classical guitarist
- Petrit Dibra (born 1953), Albanian footballer
- Petrit Dume (1920–1975), Albanian general and politician
- Petrit Fejzula (born 1951), Yugoslav handball player
- Petrit Frrokaj (born 1985), Swiss footballer
- Petrit Halilaj (born 1986), Kosovar visual artist
- Petrit Hoxhaj (born 1990), Kosovar-Dutch footballer
- Petrit Selimi (born 1979), Kosovar politician
- Petrit Vasili (born 1958), Albanian politician
- Petrit Zhubi (born 1988). Swedish footballer
