= Eva Dichand =

Austrian media manager

- Born: Eva Kriebernegg; 26 February 1973 (age 53); Graz, Austria
- Education: Economic University in Vienna
- Occupations: Media manager, publisher
- Spouse: Christoph Dichand
- Children: 3

Eva Dichand (née Kriebernegg, born 26 February 1973) is an Austria media manager, art collector and philanthropist. Since 2006, she is the publisher of the newspaper Heute. She serves as president of the university council of the Medical University of Vienna and as deputy chairwoman of the Albertina board of trustees. She has built up a significant collection of contemporary art.

== Career ==
After graduating from the HTL Matura in Graz, she studied at the University of Economics in Vienna and graduated with a dissertation on real estate offshore models in Eastern Europe. For two years she practiced as a consultant at Roland Berger. After working in the private equity area at CA, she was employed by Unternehmens Invest AG (UIAG) and supported projects for companies such as Andritz AG, Wolford, ETM professional control GmbH, Bene AG and Palfinger. She got into the newspaper business through her husband, Krone editor-in-chief and publisher Christoph Dichand. For two years she headed the now discontinued monthly magazine Our City. Since 2005 she has been managing director of the free daily newspaper Heute and from 2006 also publisher. Today brought out the weekend magazine Live in 2007, which was sold to Mediaprint shortly before it was discontinued in 2008 and no longer exists today. In 2015, she withdrew from the operational activities at Heute and spent a year with her husband and their three children in the US to get to know the (especially digital) media landscape there and to intensify contacts in the field of contemporary art.

In 2016, Dichand sold the majority of the daily newspaper Heute (AHVV GmbH) to the listed Swiss group Tamedia.

Dichand was named Media Manager of the Year 2005 by the specialist magazine “Der Österreichische Journalist”. The 2007 ExtraDienst communicator ranking selected her as the winner among women. In 2010, the World Economic Forum chose Dichand as the only Austrian as a Young Global Leader (YGL). She is also involved in social and cultural institutions and is a member of Rotary.

Since 2016, she has been a member of the International Council of the Metropolitan Museum, New York and the Musée d’Art Moderne de la Ville de Paris.

Since 2018, Dichand is Chair of the University Council of the Medical University of Vienna. In addition, in 2020, she was appointed deputy chairwoman of the board of trustees of the Albertina Museum in Vienna.

== Art Collection ==
Eva Dichand has been building up a significant collection of contemporary art over the past two decades. In this area, too, she was inspired by her father-in-law, who had assembled one of the most impressive collections of classical modernism in Austria. While the Hans Dichand collection consists of figurative art of the early 20th century from Austria (Klimt, Schiele, Kokoschka, Kubin and Wotruba), the Eva Dichand collection is open for different styles and focuses on international artists of her own generation.

Among the show pieces of the Eva Dichand collection are the paintings Hands Up (2014) by Swiss artist Miriam Cahn and Cobinnah (2019) by Ghanaian painter Amoako Boafo. Jokingly, the collector said in 2023 that she can no longer afford a Boafo painting today, considering the explosively rising prices for this artist. Even though Eva Dichand talks a bit more openly about her collection than her father-in-law did about his collection, the scope of her collection remains mysterious. What is certain is that in 2019, she already owned more than 400 works of art, and the value of the collection amounted to several millions of Euros. According to press reports, the following artists are represented in the Eva Dichand collection: the Austrians Brigitte Kowanz, Anouk Lamm, Tobias Pils, Rudolf Polanzsky, Franz West and Heimo Zobernig, the Germans Kerstin Brätsch, Imi Knoebel, Sigmar Polke, Daniel Richter and Thomas Schütte, the Italian Maurizio Cattelan, the Spanish Secundino Hernandez, the Dane Jeppe Hein, the British Thomas Houseago, the Americans Sarah Crowner, Donna Huanca and David LaChapelle, the Mexican Jose Dávila, the Argentinian Tomás Saraceno, the Venezuelian Alvaro Barrington as well as the Kosovar-Spanish duo Petrit Halilaj and Álvaro Urbano.

== Family ==
Dichand grew up as the daughter of an entrepreneur and a pharmacist in Graz. She is married to Christoph Dichand, the editor-in-chief and publisher of the Kronen Zeitung. Her father-in-law, Hans Dichand, was the founder and half-owner, editor-in-chief and publisher of the Kronen Zeitung until his death in June 2010. Eva Dichand lives with her husband and their three children, Constantin (born 2004), Arthur (born 2007) and Annabelle Gracia (born 2009) in Vienna and Paris.

== Sources ==
- Careernetwork medianet Freitag 18. Mai 2007 Seite 75
- Woman 19/2007, 14. September 2007, Karriere Medientage, Seite 95
- Der Standard 30. Jänner 2007
- Bestseller Magazin für Marketing, Werbung und Medien 9/2006 Seite 22
- Format Nr 7 17. Februar 2006
- Austrian Business Woman Nr 1, Dezember 2007 „Ladies mit Reichweite“
- Der Österreichische Journalist www.journalist.at 8+9/2007
- Extradienst ED12/ 21. Dezember 2007 Kommunikator 2007 www.mucha.at
- Format Nr 7 17. Februar 2006
- Der Österreichische Journalist www.journalist.at 8+9/2007
- Grazetta 1/2008
- https://www.pressreader.com/austria/heute-wien-ausgabe/20200130/281913070090302
- MCI Distingueshed Guest Livetalk with Eva Dichand
