= Sara Rossberg =

German-born artist based in London (born 1952)

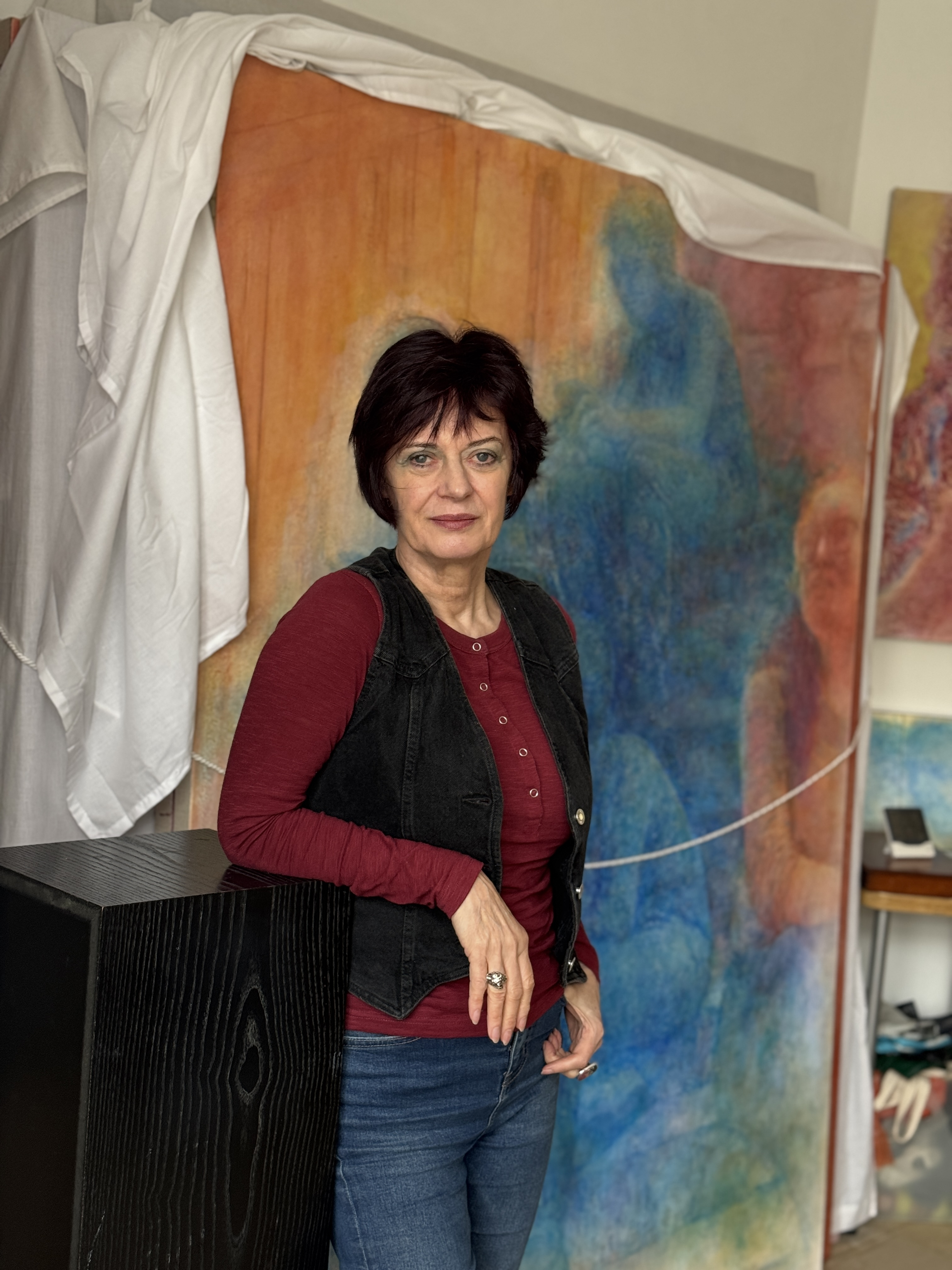
- Born: 1952 (age 73–74); Recklinghausen, Germany
- Education: Städelschule (Academy of Fine Arts, Frankfurt am Main); Camberwell College of Arts
- Known for: Painting; drawing
- Awards: Joshua Donkor Guest Judge’s Choice Award, Jackson’s Art Prize (2025); Prize winner, John Moores Exhibition 16 (1989)
- Website: Official website

Sara Rossberg (born 1952) is a German-born artist based in London. She works in painting and drawing.

== Early life and education ==
Rossberg was born in 1952 in Recklinghausen, Germany. She studied at the Academy of Fine Arts (Städelschule) in Frankfurt am Main (1971–1976), then completed postgraduate studies at Camberwell College of Arts in London (1976–1978).

== Career ==
Rossberg has lived and worked in London since the mid-1970s. Her work has been described by the National Portrait Gallery as ranging from detailed pencil drawings to large painted figures with variable surface texture.

In 1990 she was a runner-up in the National Portrait Gallery’s BP Portrait Award. In 1995 she was commissioned to make a portrait of Dame Anita Roddick for the National Portrait Gallery’s collections.

In 1989 she was among the prize winners in the John Moores Exhibition 16 at the Walker Art Gallery, Liverpool.

In 2021 she was a selected recipient of the Repaint History Call For Art Fund (February 2021 round).

In 2025 she received Joshua Donkor’s Guest Judge’s Choice Award in Jackson’s Art Prize for Emergence.

== Awards and honours ==
- 2025 – Joshua Donkor Guest Judge’s Choice Award, Jackson’s Art Prize (Emergence).
- 2021 – Recipient, Repaint History Call For Art Fund (February 2021 round).
- 1995 – Commissioned portrait: Dame Anita Roddick (National Portrait Gallery, London).
- 1990 – Runner-up, BP Portrait Award (National Portrait Gallery).
- 1989 – Prize winner, John Moores Exhibition 16 (Walker Art Gallery).

== Selected exhibitions ==
(Selection; additional exhibitions are listed on the artist’s official website.)

- 2025–2026 – Repose, William Hine Gallery, London (group exhibition).
- 2004 – The Women’s Art Collection, New Hall College, Cambridge (solo exhibition).
- 1996 – Turnpike Gallery, Leigh (solo exhibition).

== Works in collections ==
Rossberg’s portrait Dame Anita Roddick (1995) is held by the National Portrait Gallery, London.
