= Johann Friedrich Städel =

German banker (1728–1816)

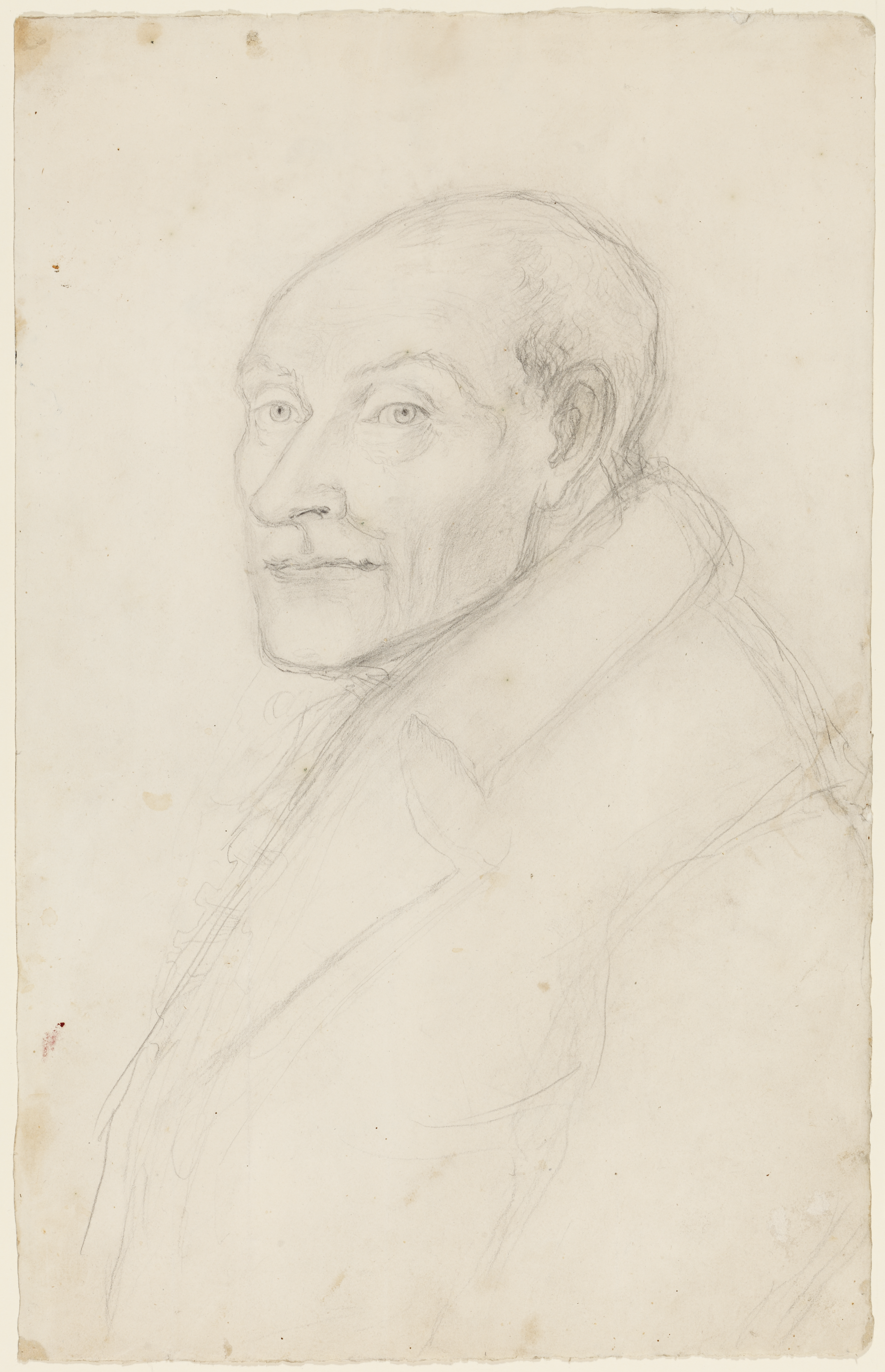
A drawing of Städel by Johann David Passavant

Johann Friedrich Städel (1728–1816) was a German banker and patron of the arts. He founded the Städel Art Institute in his will, donating his entire fortune, art collection and house to the institute.

== Life ==
Städel was born to Johann Daniel Städel, a spice trader who moved to Frankfurt in 1718, and Maria Dorothea Petzel, the daughter of a wealthy merchant. After his parents' deaths in 1777 and 1778, Städel took over the business, but soon transferred to banking. He was very successful in this business, doubling his wealth between 1783 and his death in 1816. He lived in his parents' house in the Kornmarkt until 1777 before moving into his own home on the Roßmarkt.

Städel began collecting paintings and drawings in 1770. By the time of his death, his collection contained around 500 paintings, mostly by Flemish, Dutch and German painters of the 17th and 18th centuries. The collection also contained over 4000 drawings. Johann Wolfgang von Goethe, the famous playwright and poet, visited the collection several times.

Städel did not marry and had no children. Since 1793 he had planned to create an art institute. In 1811 he requested permission to found an institute from Karl Theodor von Dalberg, the Grand Duke of Frankfurt. In Städel's will, he stipulated that both a public art collection (the Städel Kunstinstitut) as well as an art school (the Städelschule) be created in his name. He also stated that his paintings could be sold, and the institute should seek the "best" possible collections. All of the artworks owned by Städel were transferred to the collection upon his death in 1816.
