= Hans Janitschek =

Austrian writer

Hans Janitschek (6 November 1934 – 21 February 2008) was an Austrian writer, a former Secretary General of the Socialist International, and the U.S. correspondent for the Austrian newspaper, the Kronen Zeitung.

== Early life ==
Born on 6 November 1934, in Vienna, Austria, Hans Janitschek first came to the United States in 1953 as a Fulbright Program scholar at Haverford College in Pennsylvania. On his return to Austria he became Staff Correspondent of United Press International and in 1957 he joined Reuters as Senior Editor. In 1959 he became Foreign Editor of Austria’s largest daily newspaper, Kurier.

He joined the Austrian Foreign Service in 1964 and returned to the U.S. to serve as Director of the Austrian Information Service in New York for two years. In 1966 he was appointed Special Assistant to the Chairman of the Austrian Socialist Party, Bruno Kreisky.

== Secretary General of the Socialist International ==
In 1969, Hans Janitschek was elected Secretary General of the Socialist International, based in London. In this role he made his mark on the international political scene as a champion of the independence movement in Bangladesh and as an outspoken supporter of President Salvador Allende’s Popular Unity government in Chile. He was actively involved in the return to democracy of Greece, Portugal and Spain. He strongly opposed Indira Gandhi’s emergency rule in India and played a significant role in the release from prison of opposition leader George Fernandes. He supported B.P. Koirala’s freedom fight in Nepal and was instrumental in his return from exile.

== At the United Nations ==
In 1977, at the invitation of the Secretary-General, Janitschek became a Consultant to the United Nations where he served in the fields of public information, the peaceful uses of outer space, Palestine, human rights and population. During his time at the United Nations, he became involved in the Bulgarian artist Mihail Simeonov’s "Cast the Sleeping Elephant Project" for which he gained the full support of the United Nations as well as the governments of Namibia, Nepal and Kenya. He also served as president of the United Nations Society of Writers for many years, where he created the Award of Excellence, which was presented to many outstanding international public figures. One of his proudest accomplishments was to persuade the Secretary General to appoint Muhammad Ali Peace Ambassador to the UN. Janitschek gave Ali his own office and had his name plate on the door replaced with that of Ali.

He was president of the Earth Society and served as trustee of Friends World College, New York, he presented the Martin Luther King Jr. International Peace Award, to President Mikhail S. Gorbachev, Bruno Kreisky, Oscar Arias and Willy Brandt among others.

On his retirement from the United Nations, Janitschek returned to his journalistic roots as the US correspondent for the Kronen Zeitung, where in addition to reporting on current political affairs, he wrote a weekly column entitled "New York New York". He also contributed frequent news reports for Austrian radio station "Krone Hit". Most recently he joined iCastNews.com as news anchor and host of a daily news program broadcast over the internet from the United Nations.

== Author ==
Janitschek is the author of several political biographies including those of Mario Soares, president of Portugal, Oscar Arias president of Costa Rica and Governor Arnold Schwarzenegger, as well as a biography of the publisher of the Kronenzeitung, Hans Dichand. He co-authored the autobiography of Kurt Waldheim, former Secretary General of the United Nations and former president of Austria. He was also the publisher of more than a dozen books ranging from volumes of poetry, to political treatises and an autobiography of his good friend, property developer Guntram Weissenberger. His last project was a book by Mihail Simeonov depicting the story of the "Cast the Sleeping Elephant" project. As president of the "Austrians Abroad Committee" he played a fundamental role in gaining Austrians living abroad the right to vote.

On 21 February 2008 Janitschek died suddenly at the United Nations Headquarters in New York.

== Awards ==
On 1 June 2005 Hans Janitschek was awarded the Decoration of Honour in Gold for Services to the Republic of Austria.

== Books ==
- Nur ein Journalist. Hans Dichand. Ein Mann und drei Zeitungen, Wien, München und Zürich 1993 (ISBN 3-7015-0265-X)
- Arnold von Kalifornien. Der steile Weg des Steirerbuben Arnold Schwarzenegger, Wien 2003 (ISBN 3-85485105-7)
