= Portrait of a Young Woman (Botticelli, Frankfurt) =

Painting by Sandro Botticelli

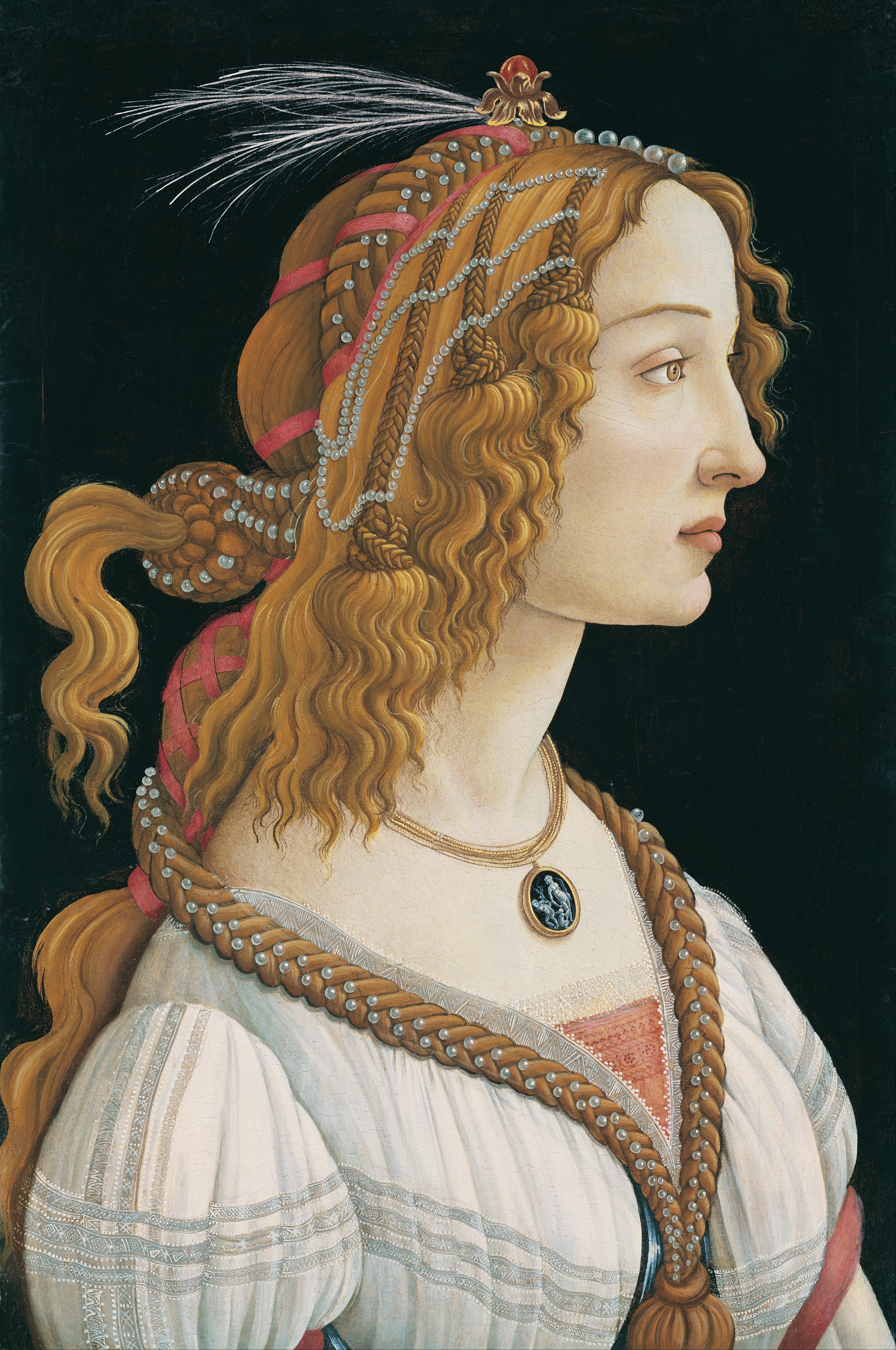
- Artist: Sandro Botticelli
- Year: 1480–1485
- Medium: Tempera on wood
- Dimensions: 82 cm × 54 cm (32 in × 21 in)
- Location: Städel Museum

Portrait of a Young Woman is a painting attributed to the Italian Renaissance painter Sandro Botticelli, who is thought to have executed it between 1480 and 1485, although some authorities attribute authorship to Jacopo da Sellaio.

The woman is shown in profile but with her bust turned in three-quarter view to reveal a cameo medallion she is wearing around her neck. The medallion in the painting is a copy in reverse of "Nero's Seal", a famous antique carnelian representing Apollo and Marsyas, which belonged to Lorenzo de' Medici. Art historian Emanuele Lugli has suggested that the three "tassels" of hair at the center of the painting represents downward flames, symbolising the love that onlookers ought to experience when looking at the portrait since, in the Renaissance it was thought that "hair inflames desire".

The art historian Aby Warburg first suggested the painting was an idealised portrait of Simonetta Vespucci. This challenged a previous interpretation, put forward by German scholars, according to which the painting describes an ideally beautiful young woman mythologised as a nymph or goddess, a view reflected in the title given it by the Städel. It belongs to a group of such paintings by Botticelli or his workshop.

The painting is housed in the Städel Museum of Frankfurt, Germany. Other similar Botticelli paintings are to be found in the National Gallery, London, the Gemäldegalerie, Berlin, and in the Marubeni Collection, Tokyo.

== Gallery ==
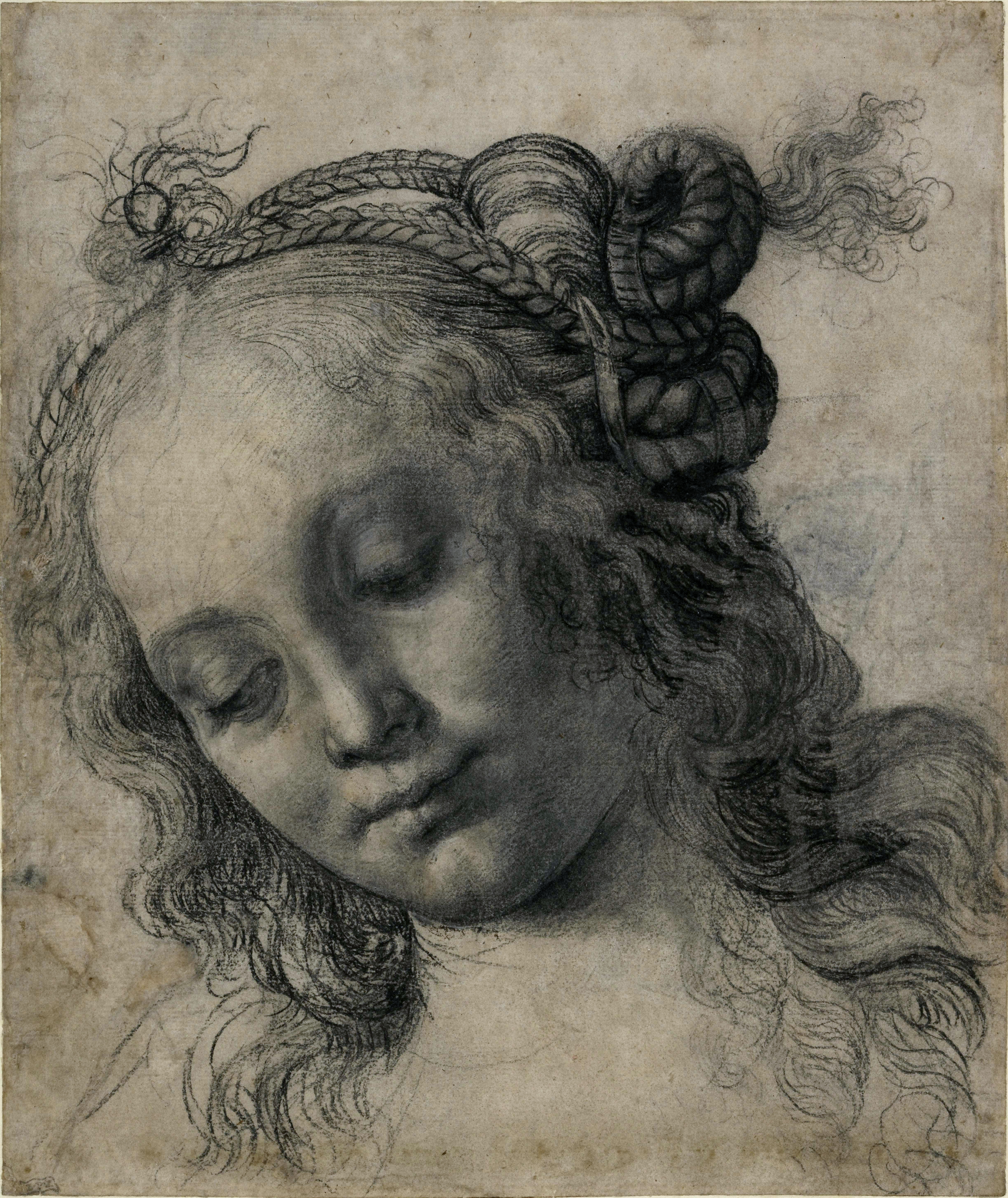
Andrea del Verrocchio - Head of a Woman, (verso & recto), c. 1475, charcoal (some oiled?), heightened with lead white, pen and brown ink (r.), charcoal (v.), 324 x 273 mm., British Museum. Verrocchio is credited with inventing this type of ideal beauty.

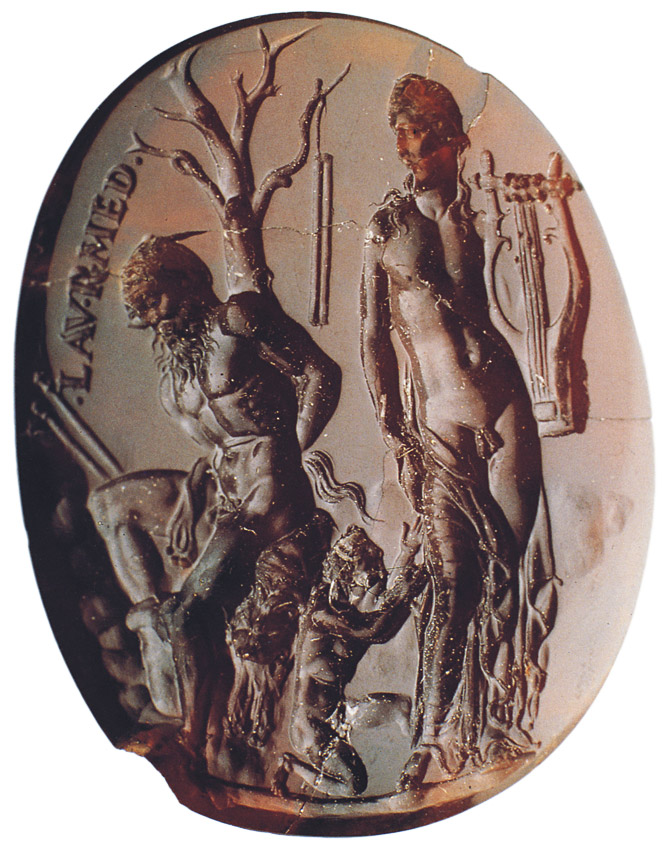
Seal of Nero, a carnelian engraved gem dating from the time of Augustus once in the possession of Lorenzo de’ Medici, currently in the Naples National Archeological Museum

== See also ==
- List of works by Sandro Botticelli

== Sources ==
Bibliography

- Brown, David (2001). Virtue & beauty : Leonardo's Ginevra de' Benci and Renaissance portraits of women. Washington: National Gallery of Art. ISBN 978-0-691-11456-9. OCLC 46314886.
- Gibson, Mary Jo. "What was really in the Medici Treasury?". This Write Life. Archived from the original on 30 August 2012.
- Malaguzzi, Silvia (2004). Botticelli. Florence: Giunti. ISBN 88-09-03677-8. OCLC 55698818.
- Musa, Mark (1999). Petrarch: The Canzoniere. Indiana University Press. ISBN 978-0-253-21317-4.
- Quint, David L. (2005). The Stanze of Angelo Poliziano. Penn State University Press. ISBN 978-0-271-02871-2.
- Wivel, Matthias (2010). "Traces of Soul, Mind, and Body". The Metabunker. Archived from the original on 30 October 2013.
