= The Blinding of Samson =

Painting by Rembrandt

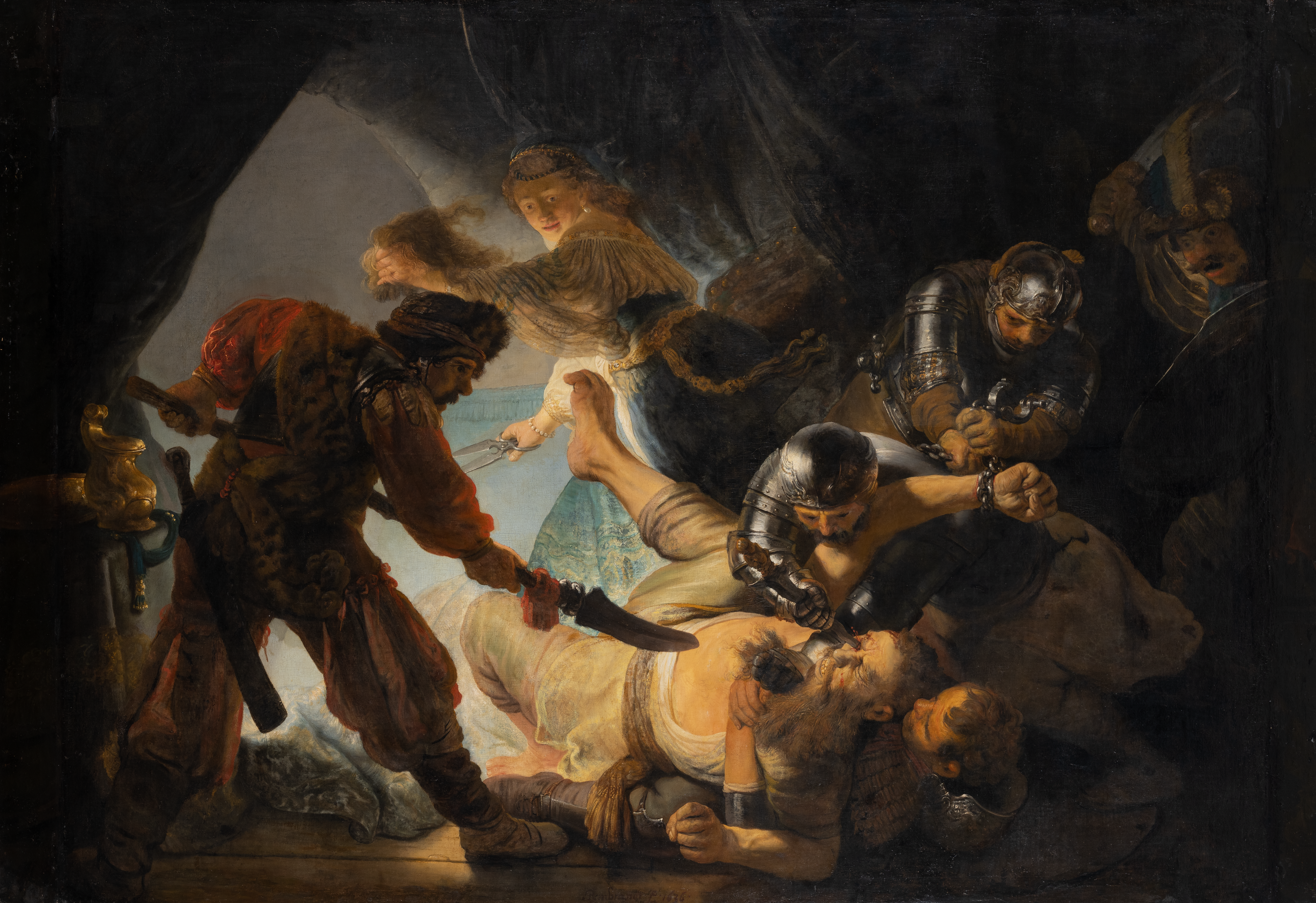
- Artist: Rembrandt
- Year: 1636
- Medium: Oil on canvas
- Dimensions: 219.3 cm × 305 cm (86.3 in × 120 in)
- Location: Städel, Frankfurt am Main

The Blinding of Samson is a 1636 painting by Rembrandt, now in the Städel (in Frankfurt). The painting is the first of its kind in pictorial tradition. No other artist at the time had painted this specific narrative moment.

This painting was a gift to the House of Orange, Rembrandt's then patron of a few commissioned paintings, via its secretary Constantijn Huygens, as an excuse for the delay of the commissioned Passion paintings. Later it was acquired by Friedrich Karl von Schönborn and remained in the Palais Schönborn-Batthyány in Vienna until it was acquired by the Städel in 1905.

== Description ==
The Blinding of Samson shows an episode from the biblical story of Judge Samson. Samson was a Nazarite, which gave him special strength when he kept three conditions, such as not cutting his beard and hair. The scene depicted follows the cutting of Samson's hair by Delilah, who betrayed him to the Philistines. This aspect of the plot is repeated in this painting, since Delilah is shown in the background fleeing with a shock of hair and scissors in hand.

Rembrandt also portrayed different aspects of the plot with the other characters. After his hair had been cut off, Samson had to be wrestled to the ground and tied up before his eyes were gouged out. This is what Rembrandt conveyed through the combatants, one of whom fearfully enters the scene, another holds Samson to the ground, one ties him up and one gouges out his eyes. The immediate action of the painting is the climax of the story, the blinding with the penetrating knife and the spurting blood. However, the viewer can reconstruct the entire action via the image.

== See also ==
- List of paintings by Rembrandt
