= Hans Dichand =

Austrian publisher, journalist and art collector (1921–2010)

Hans Dichand (29 January 1921 in Graz – 17 June 2010 in Vienna) was an Austrian journalist, writer, and media businessman. He published the tabloid newspaper Kronen Zeitung, Austria's largest newspaper in terms of readership, in which at the time of his death he held a 50% stake. As the publisher and majority owner of this newspaper Dichand became a highly significant political power factor during recent decades. Although this influence is direct only in Austria, it indirectly affects the European Union through the behavior of the Austrian government, which cannot afford to ignore the Kronen Zeitung.

He was also an important art collector, focusing himself on Art Nouveau from Austria.

== Youth and service in World War II ==
Information on Hans Dichand's early life has to rely on information published in two authorized biographies (one by the U.S. correspondent of the Kronen Zeitung Hans Janitschek and another one by Austrian writer Lore Jarosch to which Arnold Schwarzenegger has written the preface), and his autobiography. If Jarosch states in her book that "Austria's most powerful man is a mystery," this is true to the extent that little or no independently verified information has been published on the youth of Hans Dichand, or on the early stages of his career.

According to the aforementioned sources Dichand's father Johann had been a leather cutter and later a master craftsman who supplied semi-finished leatherware for the Humanic shoe factory in Graz. His mother Leopoldine worked as a society entertainer in the household of Count Carl Attems, and it appears that young Hans Dichand has lived there for some time. However, it is uncertain how much access he had to aristocratic lifestyle and culture. In the biography written by Janitschek (who had been Secretary General of the Socialist International) Dichand describes himself as a "true working class child." (Janitschek p. 19.)

At some point during the economically difficult period which Austria experienced during the inter-war period, Johann Dichand's leathermaker business folded. The family was compelled to leave the Attems Villa, exchanging it for accommodation in a housing project. Hans found it difficult to adapt to his new social environment: "When he wanted to play with the other children he was ridiculed or beaten." (Janitschek p. 34) His father subsequently left the family.

During this time Hans Dichand became an avid reader, and began to aspire to journalism: "It was the writing, all the time only the writing about the experiences and observations of what I saw happening around me, that kindled my interest." (Janitschek p. 47) At the age of 14 years (implying the year 1935) he wrote to Austrian newspapers asking for advice how to become a journalist. The editor in chief of the Kronen Zeitung recommended an apprenticeship as a typesetter. Dichand did so, while also attending evening courses for his high school education.

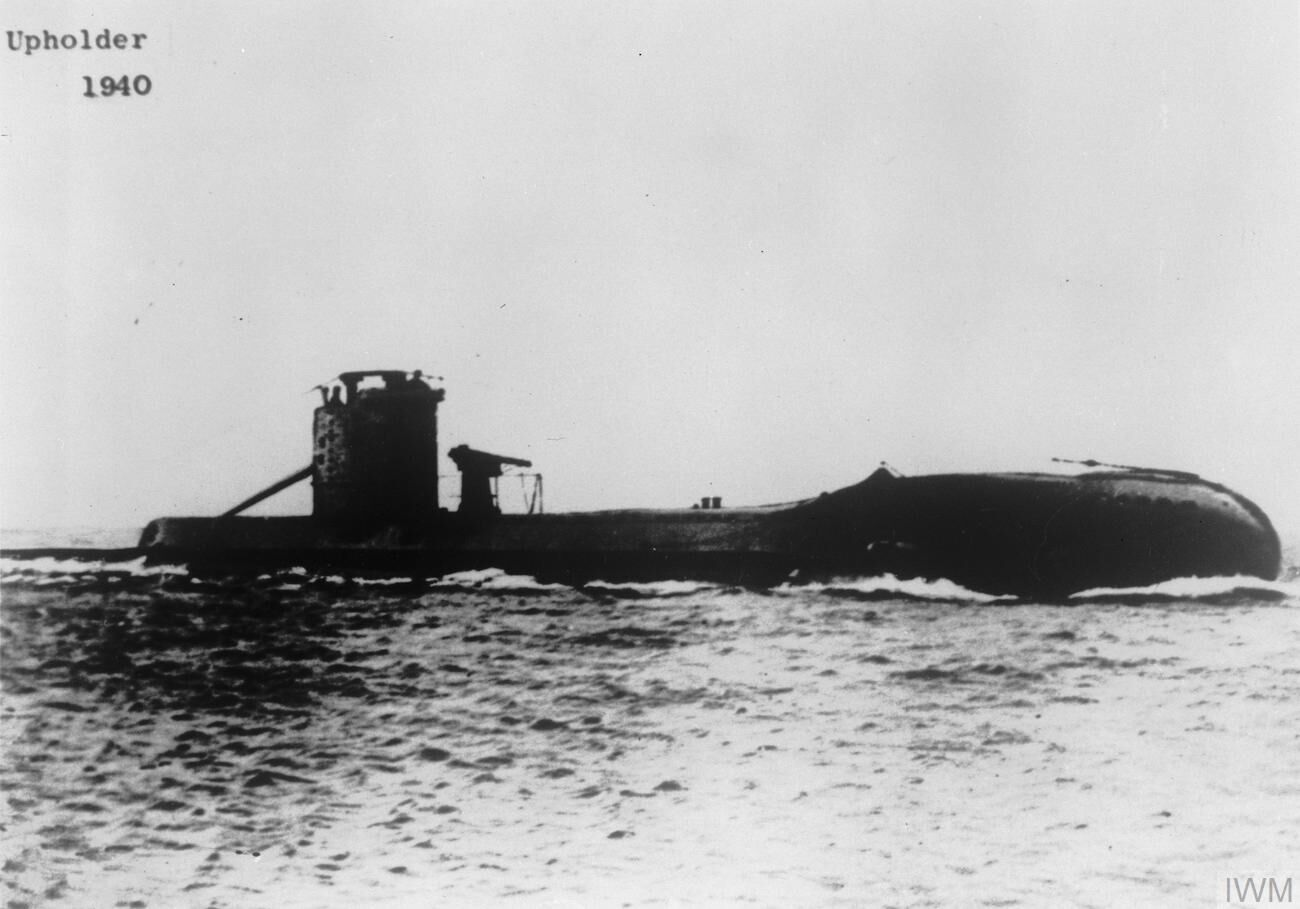
HMS Upholder which almost killed Hans Dichand in 1941

When World War II began 18-year-old Hans Dichand volunteered for the Kriegsmarine and was initially stationed at Naples, for service in an anti-aircraft detachment tasked with protecting the naval supply routes for the North African theatre. As Dichand has stated in 2007 the hastily converted armed merchantman Leverkusen on which he served was attacked and sunk on 1 May 1941 by the British submarine Upholder. Dichand fractured a leg when he jumped ship, narrowly avoided being sucked down with the sinking hull, was rescued by an Italian destroyer, and brought to a navy hospital near Tripoli. Nothing is known about his further military record until 1943, when he served as a gunner on "the Italian warship Orsa." (This might refer not to an individual ship, but merely to an Orsa-class torpedo boat.) When Italy changed sides he managed to be transferred to an Axis-run navy academy in Liepāja. When the Red Army approached the Baltic the academy was evacuated, and Dichand eventually became a British prisoner of war.

Hans Dichand denied having been a member of the Nazi Party. When in 2006 the 85-year-old powerful newspaper publisher learned during an interview that the German Wikipedia had assigned his biography article to the category "NSDAP member" he angrily exclaimed, "I never even came close to the NSDAP! I even managed to avoid compulsory membership in the Hitlerjugend!"

== Journalist in post-war Austria ==
Again according to the self-written or approved biographies, Dichand was released from British captivity in October 1945, returned to Graz in November, and became a journalist at the British news service for Allied-occupied Austria where he was tasked with recording content broadcast by the BBC radio service and with processing it for publication in the Neue Steirischen Zeitung.

In 1946, at age 25, Dichand became editor-in-chief of the Judenburg newspaper Murtaler Zeitung which at that time was jointly owned by the conservative, socialist, and communist parties of Austria. In 1949 he secured himself an equivalent position at the newly founded independent Kleine Zeitung which was facing a boycott by the party-controlled Austrian state news agency. Building on his experience in British service, Dichand was able to solve that problem by accessing international newswires. During the following five years he developed the Kleine Zeitung into Austria's largest regional daily newspaper.

In 1954 Dichand became editor in chief of the Wiener Kurier, the predecessor of today's Kurier. However, Dichand soon faced increasing opposition from his staff because he prevented extensive reporting on the many legal proceedings against war criminals that were ongoing at this time. "He instinctively felt that a paper with a more conciliatory stance towards former Nazi Party members would be met with sympathy, and he aligned his paper's attitude with that of the populace." (Janitschek p. 103). Dichand managed to control this internal opposition but left in 1958 when differences of opinion developed with the newspaper's owner over the sale of the recently acquired newspaper Bildtelegraph.

== Founding the Neue Kronen Zeitung ==
When Dichand walked away from the Wiener Kurier in October 1958 six leading journalists (which included the author and theatre critic Hans Weigel) left with him. These journalists formed the initial core team for a new newspaper, conceived by Dichand and his partner Friedrich Dragon, with the intent of reviving the time-honored name Kronen-Zeitung. Franz Olah, then president of the powerful Austrian Trade Union Federation, provided a contact with the businessman Kurt Falk and also facilitated substantial funding for the project, from sources that ultimately remained untraced. The rise of the Neue Kronen Zeitung to an unprecedented degree of readership coverage, especially since the mid-1960s and especially in the densely populated Northeast of Austria, became inextricably entwined with the person of Hans Dichand and his personal leadership.

== Media power, attitudes, and criticism ==
The newspaper which Dichand created and shaped allowed him to attain a position of public opinion-moving power which most politicians feel they could oppose only at the peril of their careers. In June 2009 a commentary in the Wiener Zeitung summarized: "In this country he exercises power comparable only to that of the Roman imperators; merely by lifting or lowering his thumb he can point a two-digit percentage of the electorate this way or that." Helmut Kukacka, a former Secretary of State and media contact of the conservative Austrian People's Party, was cited by the major German newspaper Die Zeit as saying with (careful but unusually direct) reference to Dichand, "One has his fears. One makes his arrangements." In the commentary part of the same article Die Zeit was more outspoken: "Where Dichand's wrath falls, destruction reigns."

However, Dichand (who wrote using the pseudonym Cato, in apparent reference to the Roman statesmen Cato the Elder and/or Cato the Younger) has always presented himself as being

"...not interested in personal power at all. What am I supposed to do with power? I'd rather stay at home and fuss with my dog. What I am after, and what I defend, is success; and for me success lies in convincing readers, in amplifying the trends that arise in the populace. Beyond that, I shall be completely content if I can master myself." (Janitschek p. 20)

When asked four years later if he really considered himself as having set foot only "in the anteroom of power" (an allusion to the title of Dichand's autobiography), he replied in a very similar fashion:

"I simply wouldn't know what to do with personal power; I'd rather pat my dog at home. But exerting power on behalf of our readers is a different matter entirely. It's not as if we would parrot them; we want to be a step ahead of them, to show them perspectives which they might not have considered."

In 2003 the Swiss daily Neue Zürcher Zeitung cited him as saying that "we perceive ourselves as a political corrective in a time of mediocre politics", and did not fail to point out that "using the 'we' in this fashion indicates the majestic plural which this phenomenon of an Austrian publisher is fond of."

The support which the Kronen Zeitung has always given to controversial politicians such as Kurt Waldheim, Jörg Haider and Barbara Rosenkranz, as well as to various populist calls for increased surveillance and strict punishment, has made Hans Dichand a habitual and unfailing target of criticism by libertarians, leftists, and privacy advocates. In 2007 he was named a recipient of one of the Austrian Big Brother Awards, for the work of his "life as a manipulator of the republic".

== Relevance for the European Union ==
The Kronen Zeitung had supported the Austrian government's successful referendum campaign for EU accession in 1994, but after that time Dichand (and his newspaper) turned highly critical of the European Union and its expansion, frequently citing the most bizarre myths and making unverifiable allegations. Although the Kronen Zeitung is hardly known beyond Austria's borders its influence on the country's politics has already affected Austria's representation in the European Parliament by Dichand's massive support for the extremely EU-critical Hans-Peter Martin's List, and in 2008 the leaders of the Social Democratic Party of Austria wrote an open letter to Dichand in which they committed themselves to making Austrian consent to "all important EU matters that impact Austria" contingent on a public referendum in Austria, specifically naming changes in the Treaties of the European Union and the accession of Turkey to the European Union as examples.

== Art collection ==
The Hans Dichand collection is one of the most mysterious in Europe. Only a few works belonging to the collection are known, such as the Danaë by Klimt or 150 graphics by Kubin, shown in 1999 in an exhibition in Eisenstadt. Reports from visitors to his villa confirm that it is one of the most significant private art collections in Austria.

It predominantly consists of works from the Art Nouveau movement and Classical Modernism from Austria, with a focus on Klimt, Schiele, Kokoschka, Moll, Egger-Lienz, Gerstl, Boeckl, and Wotruba. The collection is spread across the various residences of the family and partly in duty-free warehouses in Switzerland. The value of the collection is estimated at several hundred million Euros.

Dichland's daughter-in-law, Eva Dichand, is also a renowned art collector, however with a different focus. She collects international contemporary art.

== Personal life ==
Dichand was briefly hospitalized after suffering a fall in August 2008 but soon returned to his personal office from where he directed the Kronen Zeitung as its chief executive and 50-percent owner, although in 2003 he installed his youngest son Christoph as his successor in the role of editor in chief.

Dichand, who was married, had another son (Michael) and a daughter, Johanna. He dismissed as baseless a rumor that had claimed the head of the socialdemocratic party and chancellor of Austria, Werner Faymann to be an extramarital son.

== Books by Hans Dichand ==
- Kronen Zeitung : Die Geschichte eines Erfolges. Orac Verlag, Vienna 1977
- Begegnung mit Paris. Wien 1982; ISBN 3-217-01229-1
- Die Künstler der klassischen Moderne in Österreich. Propyläen Verlag, Berlin and Vienna 1989; ISBN 3-549-05311-8
- Im Vorhof der Macht. Iberia & Molden Verlag, Vienna 1996; ISBN 3-900436-36-3
