= Städel =

Art museum in Frankfurt, Germany

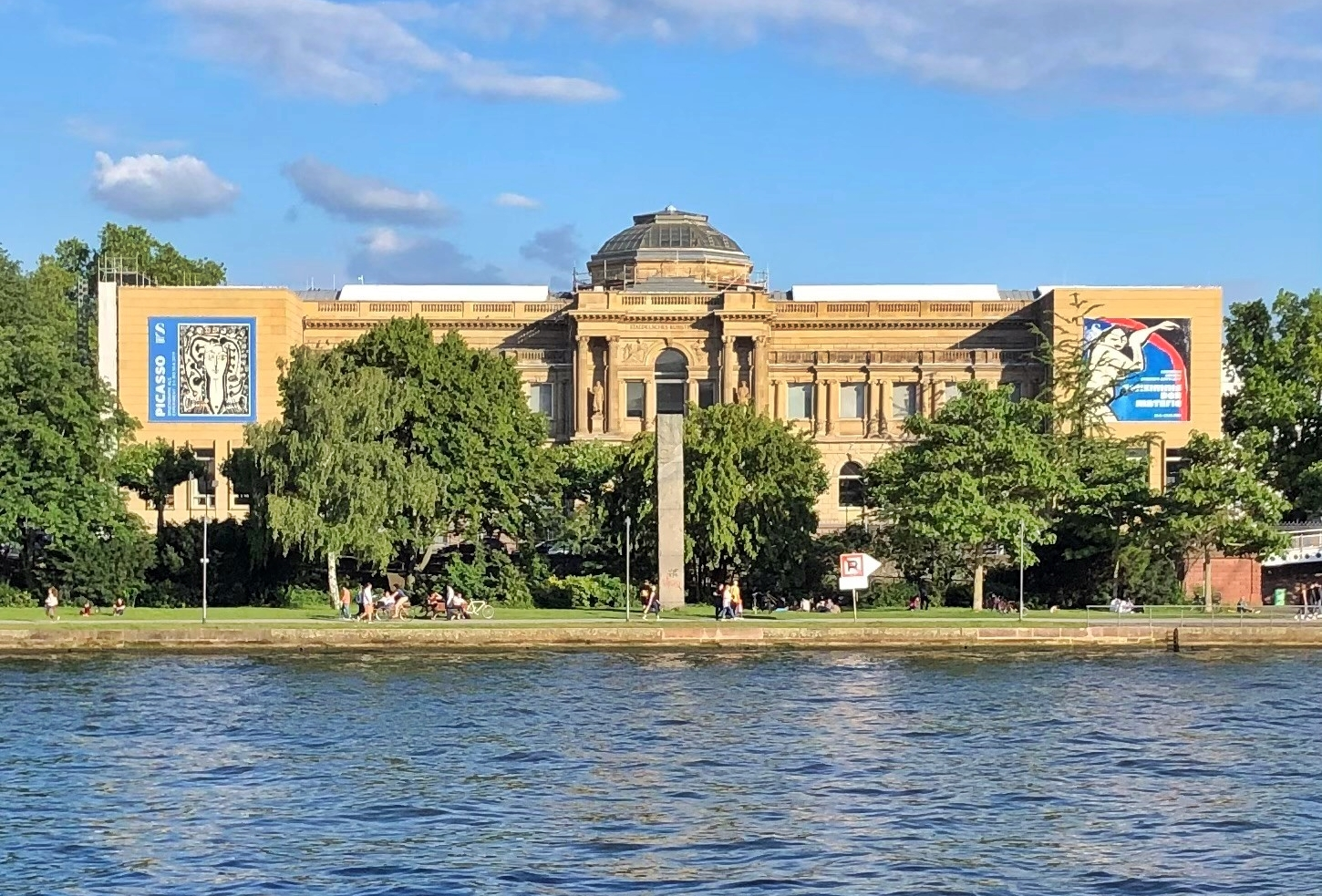
- The Städel Museum, August 2022
- Interactive fullscreen map
- Established: 1817; 209 years ago
- Location: Schaumainkai 63, Museumsufer, Frankfurt, Germany
- Coordinates: 50°06′12″N 8°40′26″E
- Type: Art museum
- Key holdings: Lucas Cranach the Elder, Albrecht Dürer, Sandro Botticelli, Rembrandt van Rijn, Jan Vermeer, Claude Monet, Pablo Picasso, Max Beckmann, Gerhard Richter
- Collections: Old Masters; Modern Art; Contemporary Art; Department of Prints and Drawings; Photography
- Collection size: 3,100 paintings; 660 sculptures; 4,600 photographs; 100,000 drawings and prints
- Visitors: 370,716 (2025)
- Founder: Johann Friedrich Städel
- Director: Philipp Demandt
- Architects: Oskar Sommer (1878); Johannes Krahn (rebuild 1966); Gustav Peichl (extension building 1990); Schneider+Schumacher (extension 2012)
- Employees: 121 (2025) together with Liebieghaus
- Public transit access: Schweizer Platz (10 min); 15, 16 Otto-Hahn-Platz (4 min)
- Website: www.staedelmuseum.de

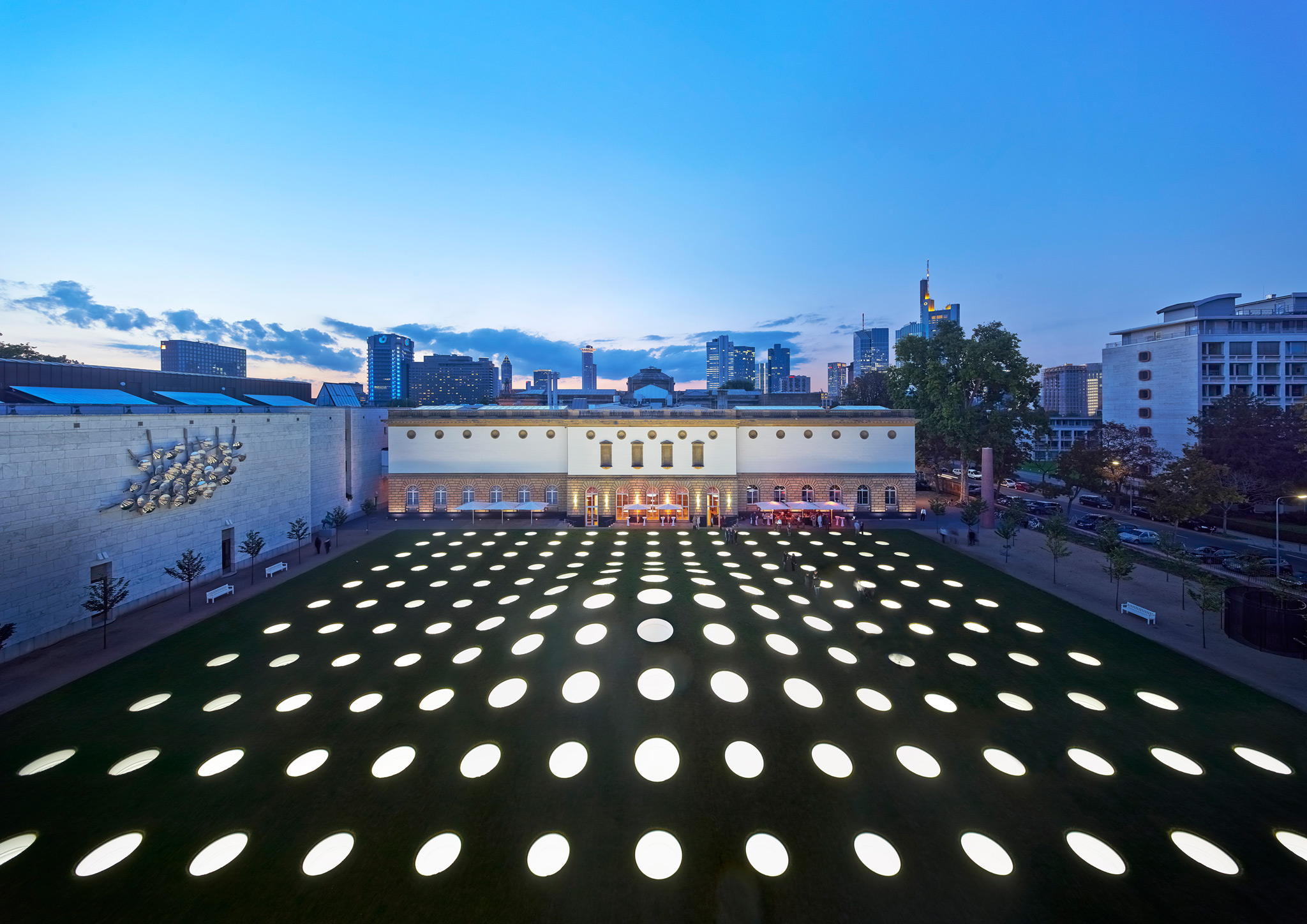
The Städel Museum with Städel Garden, October 2014

The Städel, officially the Städelsches Kunstinstitut und Städtische Galerie, is an art museum in Frankfurt, with one of the most important collections in Germany. The museum is located at the Museumsufer on the Sachsenhausen bank of the River Main. The Städel Museum owns 3,100 paintings, 660 sculptures, more than 4,600 photographs and more than 100,000 drawings and prints. It has around 7,000 m^{2} (75,000 ft^{2}) of display and a library of 115,000 books.

In 2012, the Städel was honoured as Museum of the Year by the German art critics association AICA. In the same year the museum recorded the highest attendance figures in its history, of 447,395 visitors. In 2020 the museum had 318,732 visitors, down 45 percent from 2019, due to the COVID-19 pandemic. It ranked 71st on the list of most-visited art museums in 2020.

== History ==
=== 19th century ===
The Städel was founded in 1817, and is one of the oldest museums in Frankfurt. The founding followed a bequest by the Frankfurt banker and art patron Johann Friedrich Städel (1728–1816), who left his house, art collection and fortune with the request in his will that the institute be set up. In the early years, Städel's former living quarters at Frankfurt's Roßmarkt were used to present his collection. (Note: 1782–1833: Zum Goldenen Bären, Roßmarkt 18.) The collection received its first exhibition building at the Neue Mainzer Straße in 1833. (Note: 1833–1878: Haus Vrints-Treuenfeld, Neue Mainzer Straße Nr. 47–49.)

=== 19th-century building ===
In 1878, a new museum building, in the Neo-Renaissance style, was erected by Oskar Sommer on Schaumainkai, a street along the south side of the river Main.

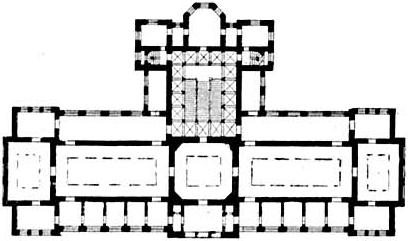
Floor plan, 1894

=== 20th century ===
In 1937, 77 paintings and 700 prints were confiscated from the museum when the National Socialists declared them "degenerate art".

In 1939, the collection of the Städel Museum was removed to avoid destruction from the Allied bombings, and the collection was stored in the Schloss Rossbach, a castle owned by the Baron Thüngen near Bad Brückenau in Bavaria. There, the museum's paintings and library were discovered by Lt. Thomas Carr Howe, USN, of the American Monuments, Fine Arts and Archives program.

=== Renovations and extensions ===
The gallery was substantially damaged by air raids in World War II, it was rebuilt in 1966 following a design by the Frankfurt architect Johannes Krahn. An expansion building for the display of 20th-century work and special exhibits was erected in 1990, designed by the Austrian architect Gustav Peichl. Small structural changes and renovations took place from 1997 to 1999.

An underground wing for the presentation of contemporary art was designed by the Frankfurt architectural firm Schneider+Schumacher and opened in February 2012. This was the largest extension in the museum's history, increasing its total display area from 4,000 m^{2} (43,000 ft^{2}) to 7,000 m^{2} (75,000 ft^{2}).

== Digital expansion ==
The Städel has been significantly enlarging its activities and outreach through a major digital expansion on the occasion of its 200-year anniversary in 2017. An exhibition 'digitorial' and free WiFi access are already available to visitors throughout the museum and its grounds. The museum offers to visitors a Städel app, the possibility of listening to audio guides on their own devices, and a new 'cabinet of digital curiosities'. Around its 200-year anniversary, several projects were in development, including an online exhibition platform; educational computer games for children; online art-history courses and a digital art book.

=== Creative commons ===
The Städel Museum made more than 22,000 works in its Digital Collection available for free downloading under the Creative Commons licence CC BY-SA 4.0.

== Collection ==
The Städel has European paintings from seven centuries, beginning with the early 14th century, moving into Late Gothic, the Renaissance, Baroque, and into the 19th, 20th and 21st centuries. The large collection of prints and drawings is not on permanent display and occupies the first floor of the museum. Works on paper not on display can be viewed by appointment.

The gallery has a conservation department that performs conservation and restoration work on the collection.

== Temporary exhibitions ==
Most visited exhibitions:

- "Making Van Gogh" 2019/2020 (505,750 visitors)
- "Monet und die Geburt des Impressionismus" 2015 (432,121 visitors)
- "Botticelli" 2009/2010 (367,033 visitors)
- "Dürer. Kunst – Künstler – Kontext" 2013/2014 (258,577 visitors)

Recent exhibitions:

- "Holbein" 2023/2024

== Selected works ==
- Robert Campin, Flémalle Panels, c. 1428–1430, mixed technique, 160.2 × 68.2 cm, 151.8 × 61 cm, 148.7 × 61 cm
- Jan van Eyck, Lucca Madonna, c. 1437, mixed technique, 66 x 50 cm
- Fra Angelico, Madonna with Child and Twelve Angels, 1430–1433, tempera on panel, 37 x 27 cm
- Rogier van der Weyden, Medici Madonna, c. 1460–1464, oil on panel, 61.7 x 46.1 cm
- Master of the Frankfurt Paradiesgärtlein, Paradiesgärtlein, between 1400 and 1420, mixed technique on oak, 26 x 33 cm
- Hieronymus Bosch, Ecce Homo, c. 1476, oil on panel, 75 x 61 cm
- Sandro Botticelli, Portrait of a Young Woman, 1480–85, mixed technique on a poplar panel, 82 x 54 cm
- Bartolomeo Veneto, Portrait of a Young Woman, between 1500 and 1530, mixed technique on a poplar panel, 44 x 34 cm
- Rembrandt Harmenszoon van Rijn, The Blinding of Samson, 1636, oil on canvas, 205 x 272 cm
- Johannes Vermeer, The Geographer, 1668–1669, oil on canvas, 52 x 45.5 cm
- Johann Heinrich Wilhelm Tischbein, Goethe in the Roman Campagna, 1787, oil on canvas, 164 x 206 cm
- Claude Monet, The Luncheon, 1868–1869, oil on canvas, 231.5 x 151.5 cm
- Edgar Degas, Musicians in the Orchestra, 1872, oil on canvas, 69 x 49 cm
- Auguste Renoir, After the Luncheon, 1879, oil on canvas, 100.5 x 81.3 cm
- Franz Marc, Dog Lying in the Snow , c. 1911, oil on canvas, 62.5 x 105 cm
- Max Ernst, Aquis Submersus, 1919, oil on canvas, 54 × 43.8 cm

The museum also features works by the 20th-century German artist Max Beckmann, who taught at the Städelschule.

== Gallery ==
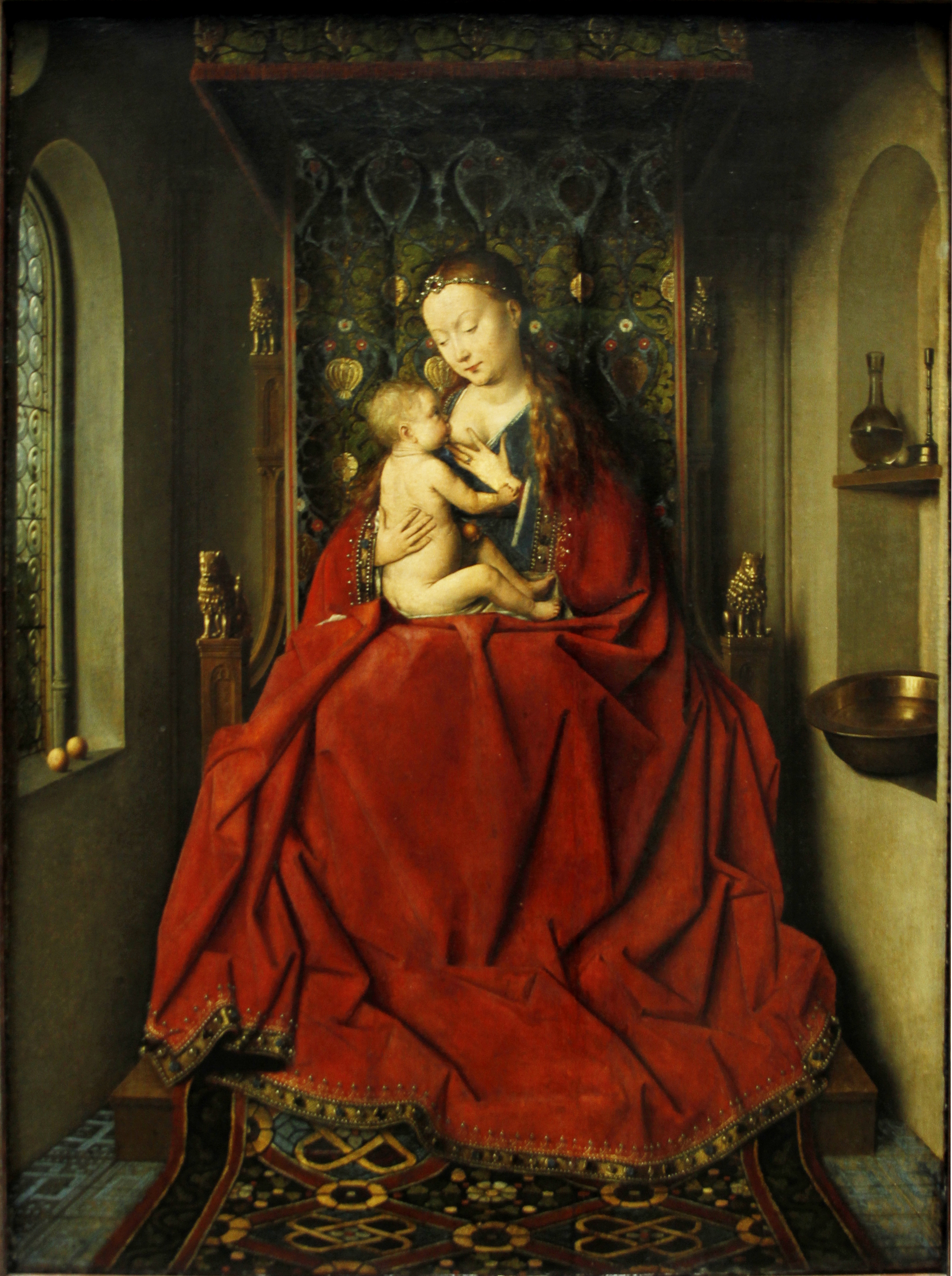
Jan van Eyck, Lucca Madonna

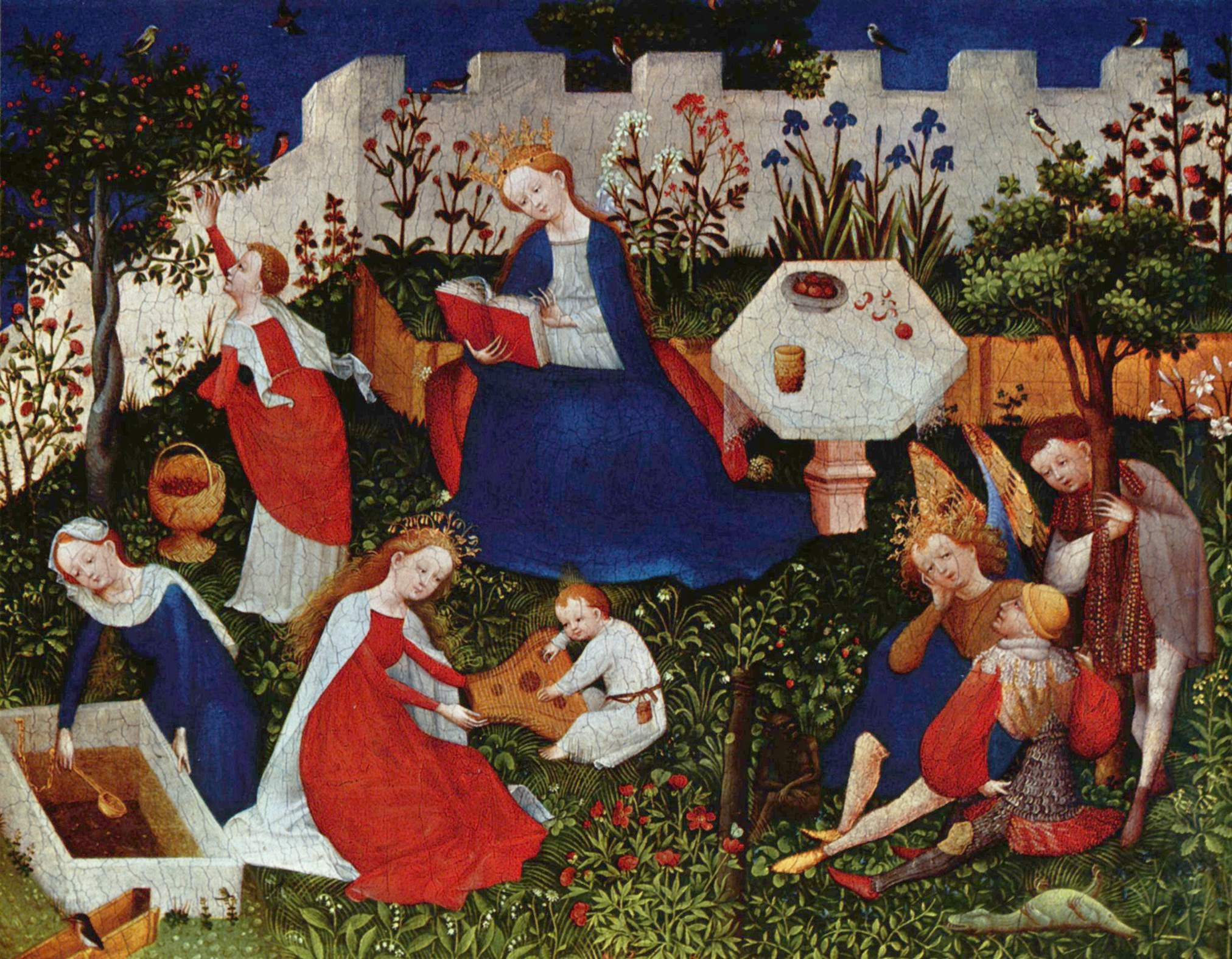
Oberrheinischer Meister, Paradiesgärtlein

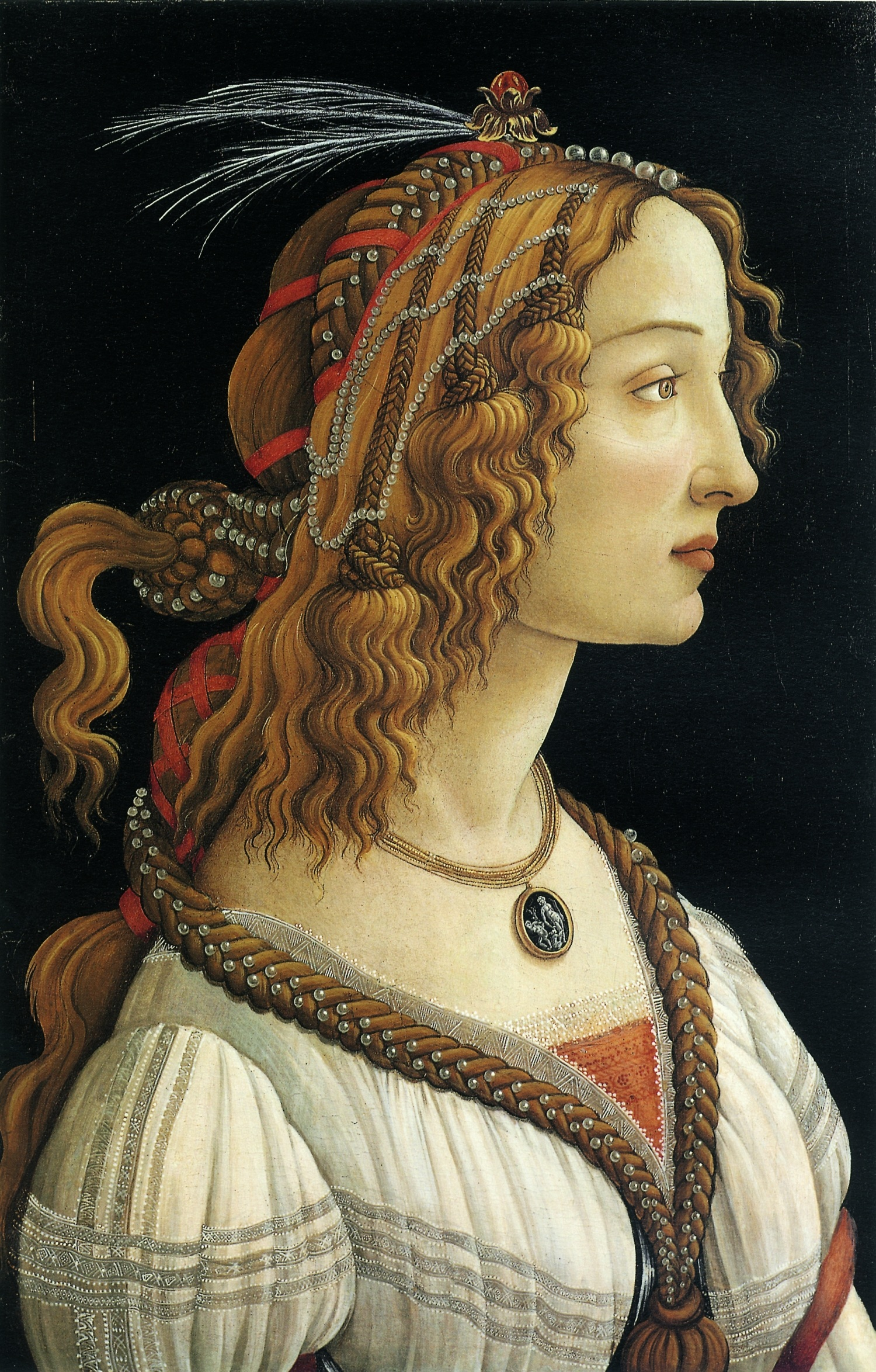
Sandro Botticelli, Portrait of a Young Woman

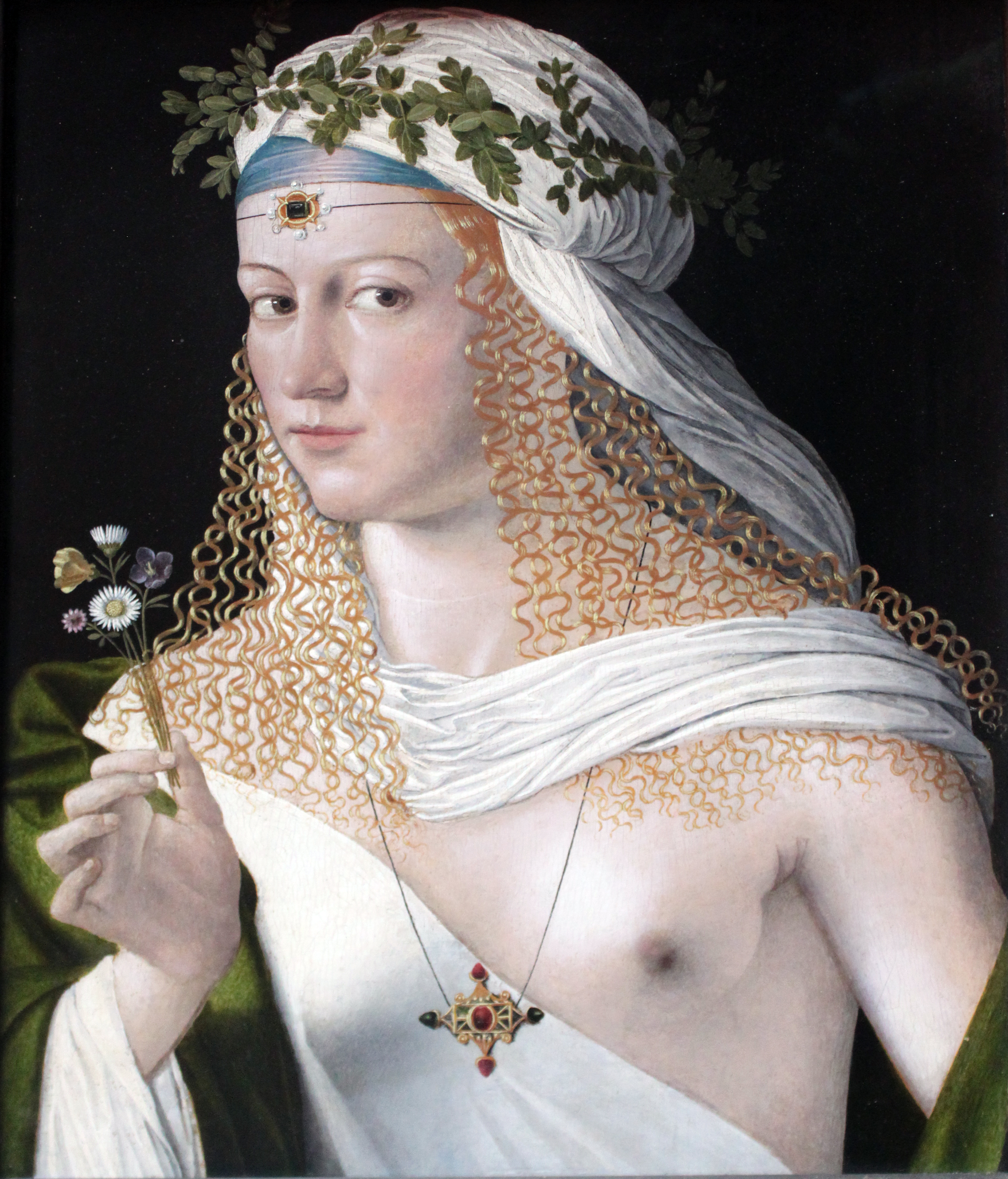
Bartolomeo Veneto, Portrait of a Young Woman

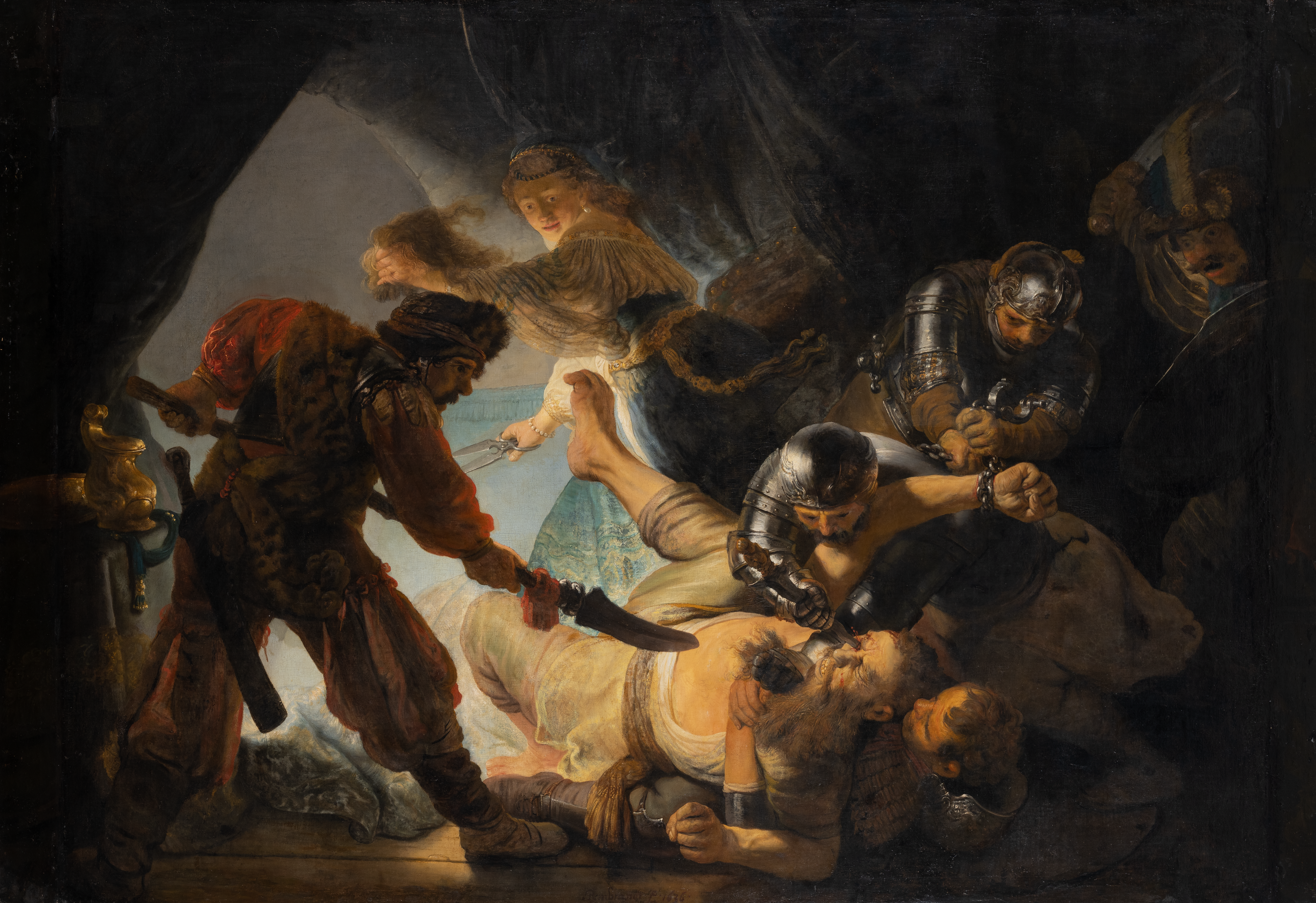
Rembrandt Harmenszoon van Rijn, The Blinding of Samson

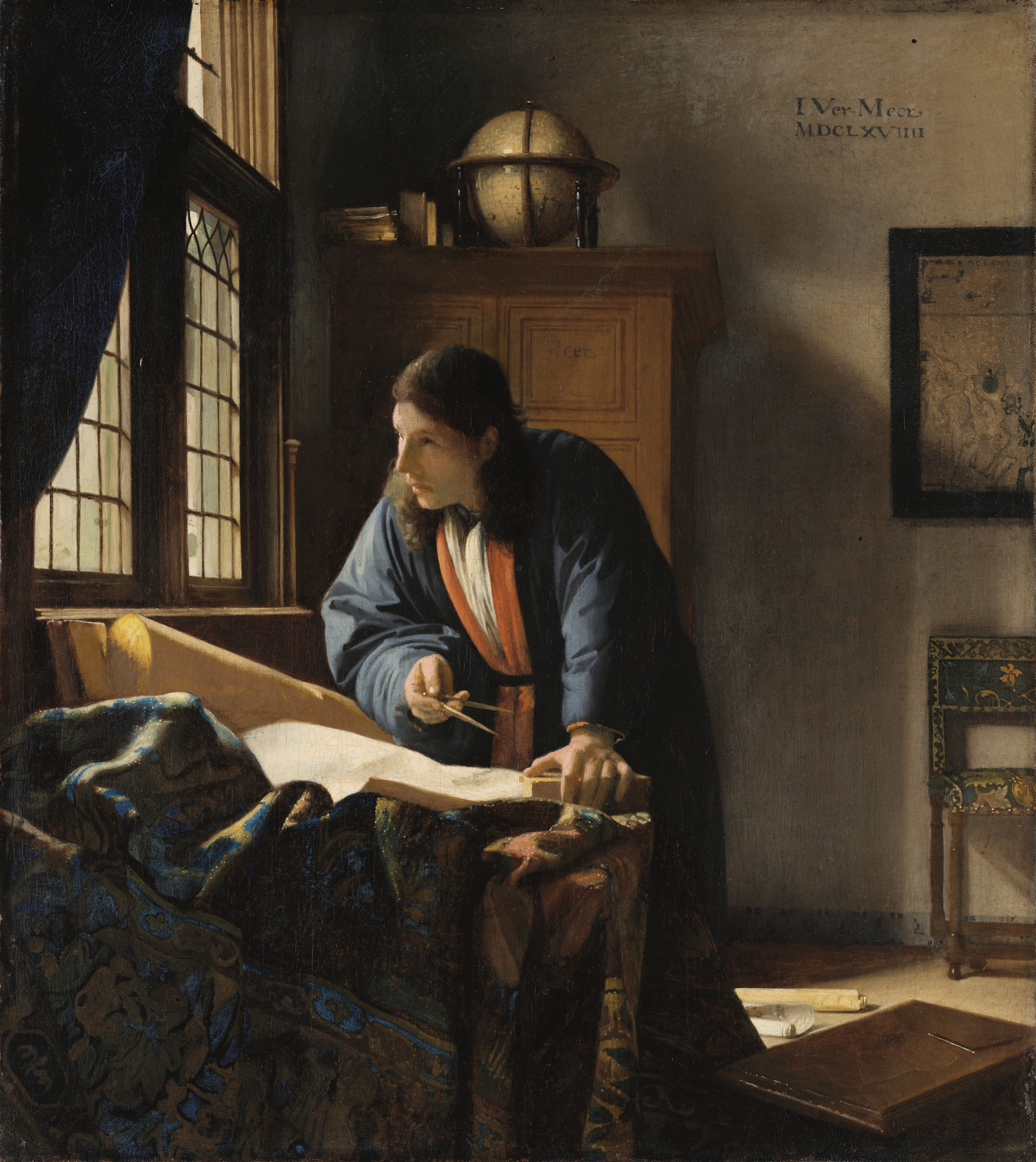
Johannes Vermeer, The Geographer

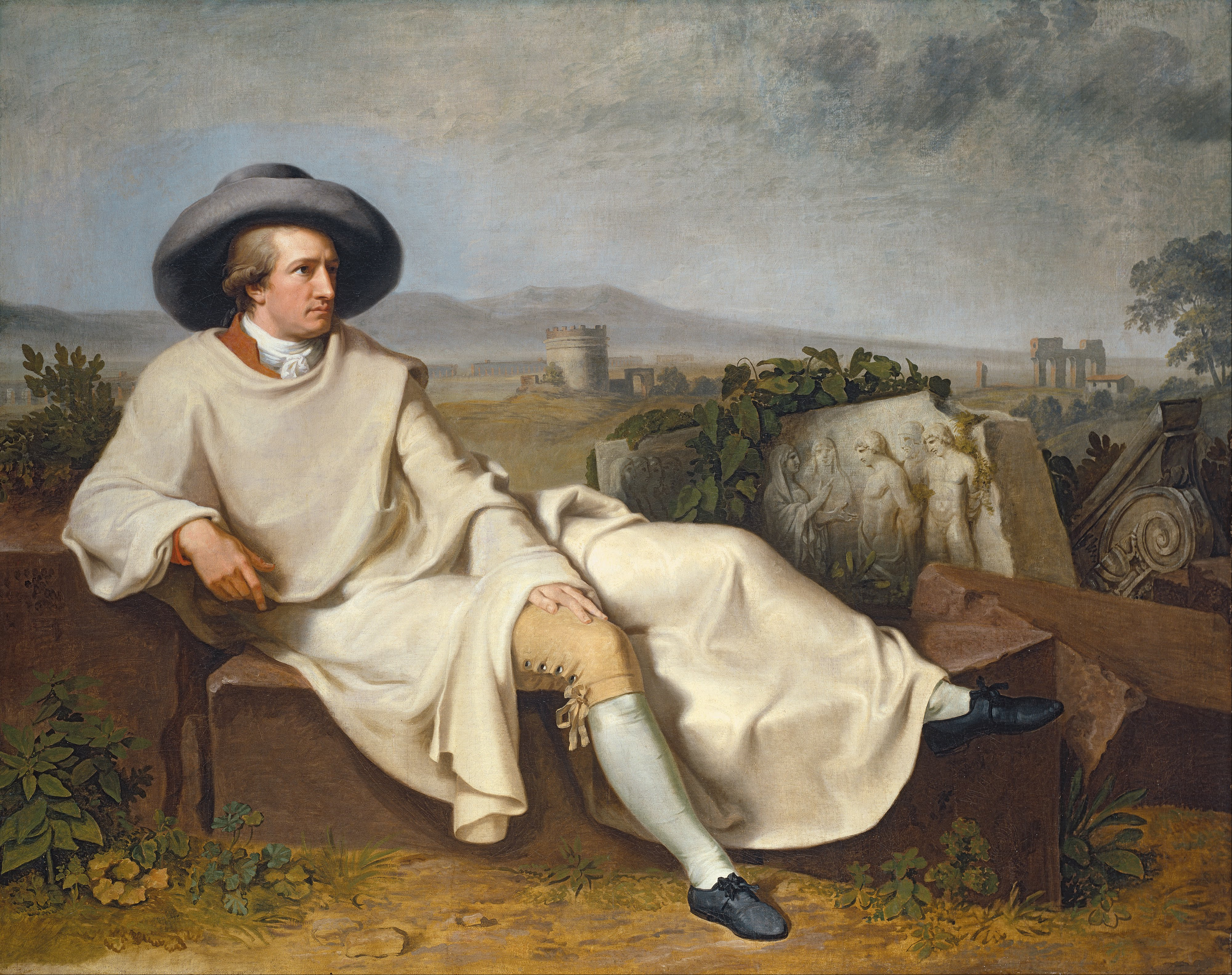
Johann Heinrich Wilhelm Tischbein, Goethe in the Roman Campagna

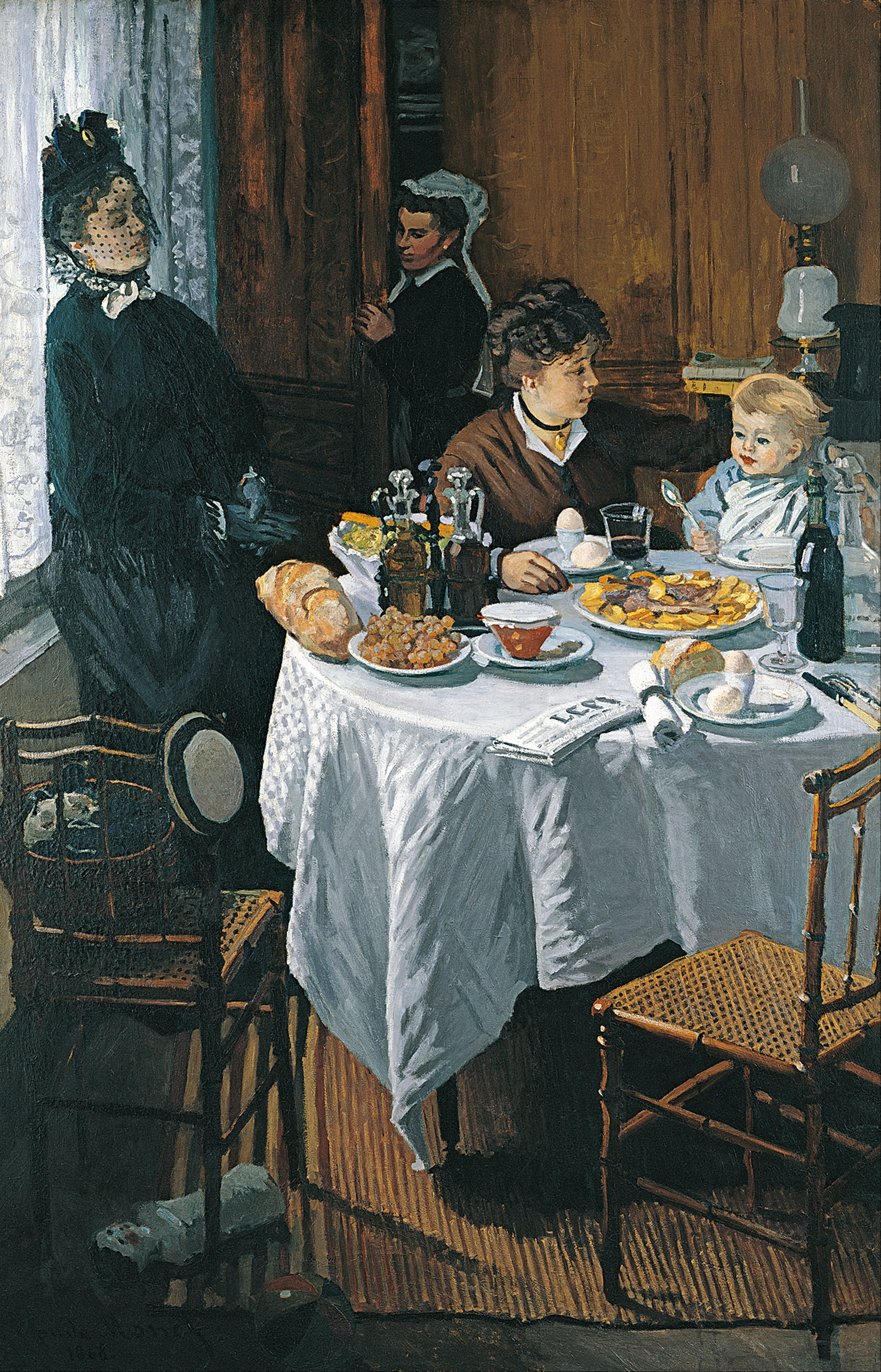
Claude Monet, The Luncheon

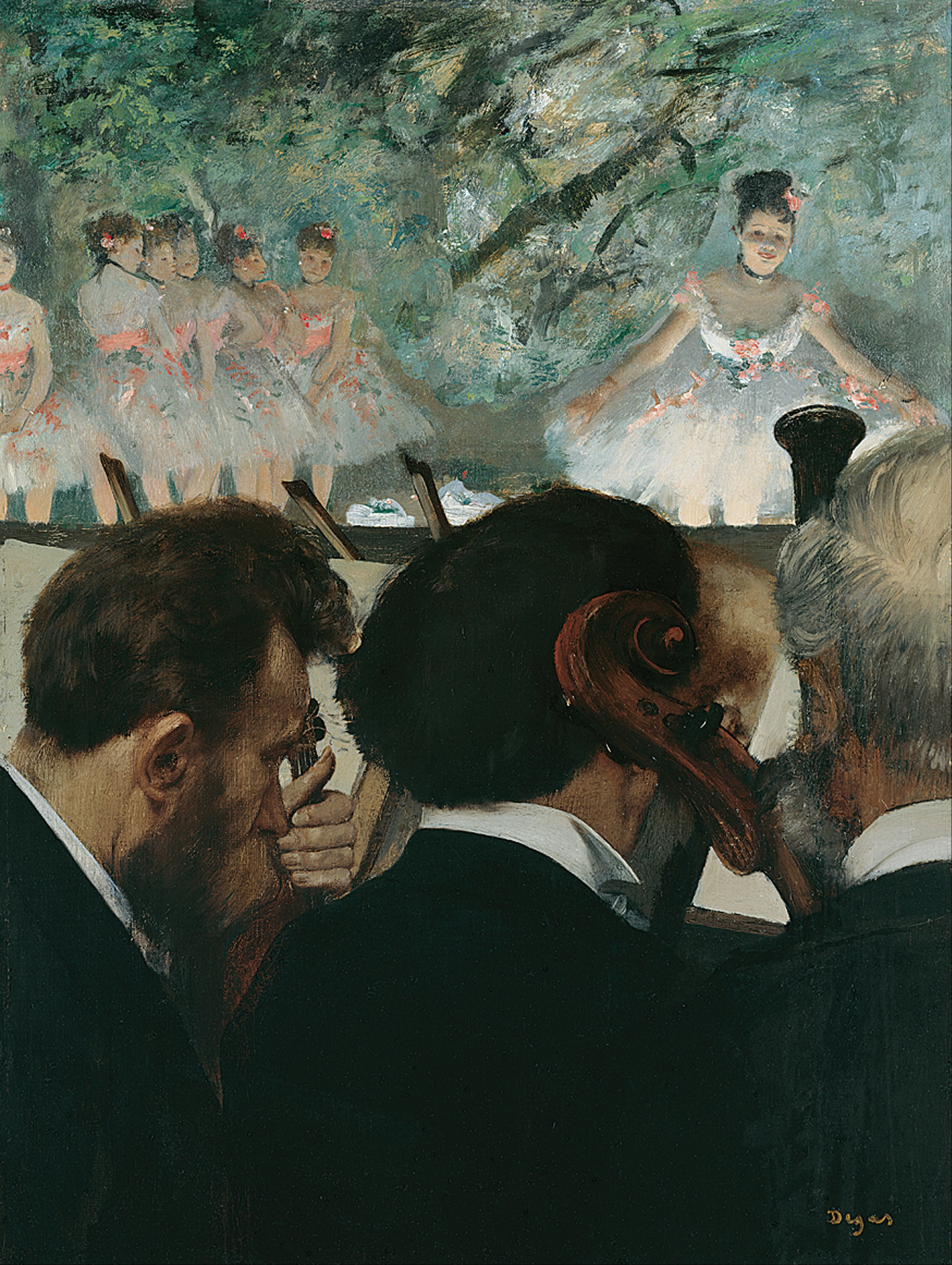
Edgar Degas, Musicians in the Orchestra

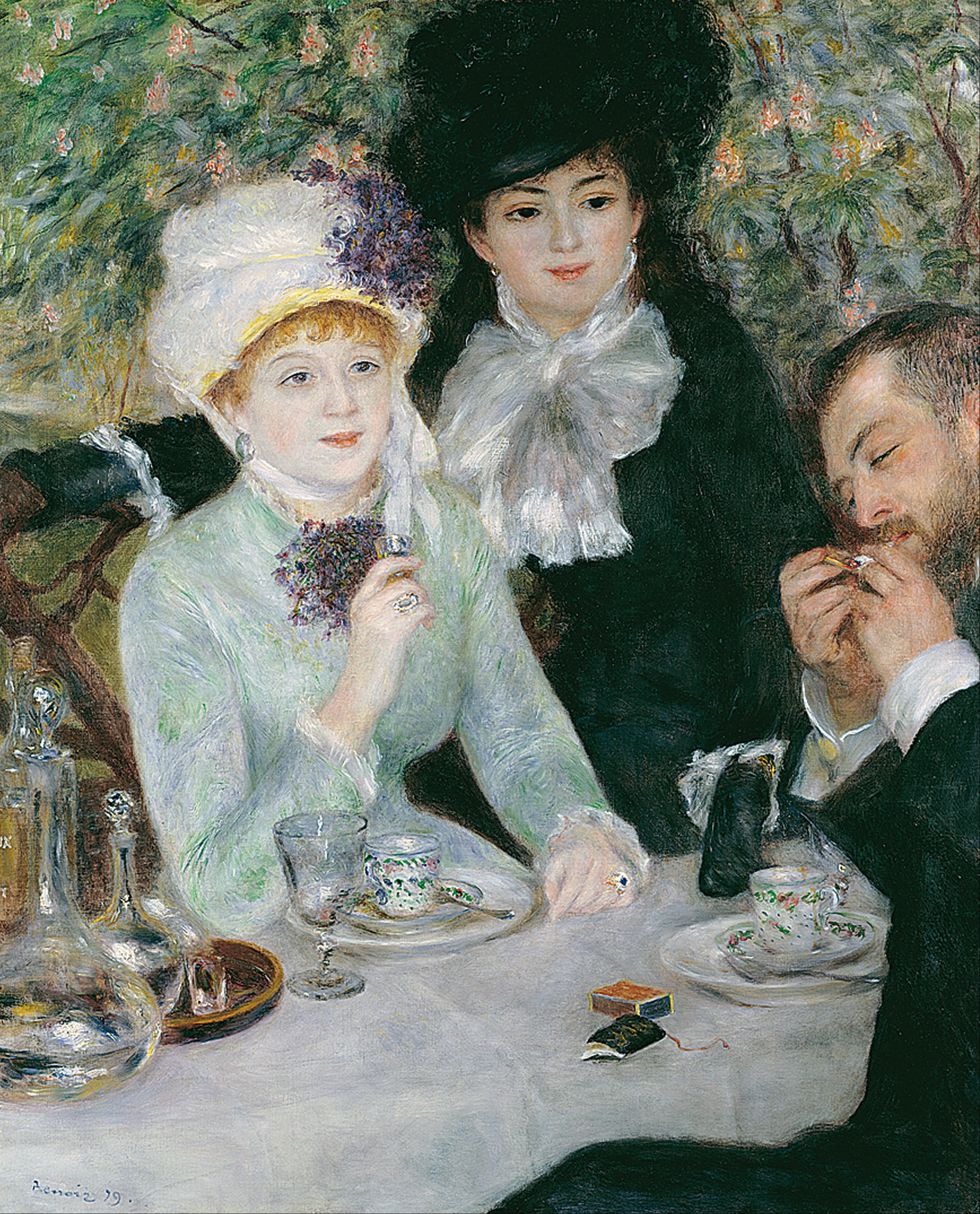
Auguste Renoir, After the Luncheon

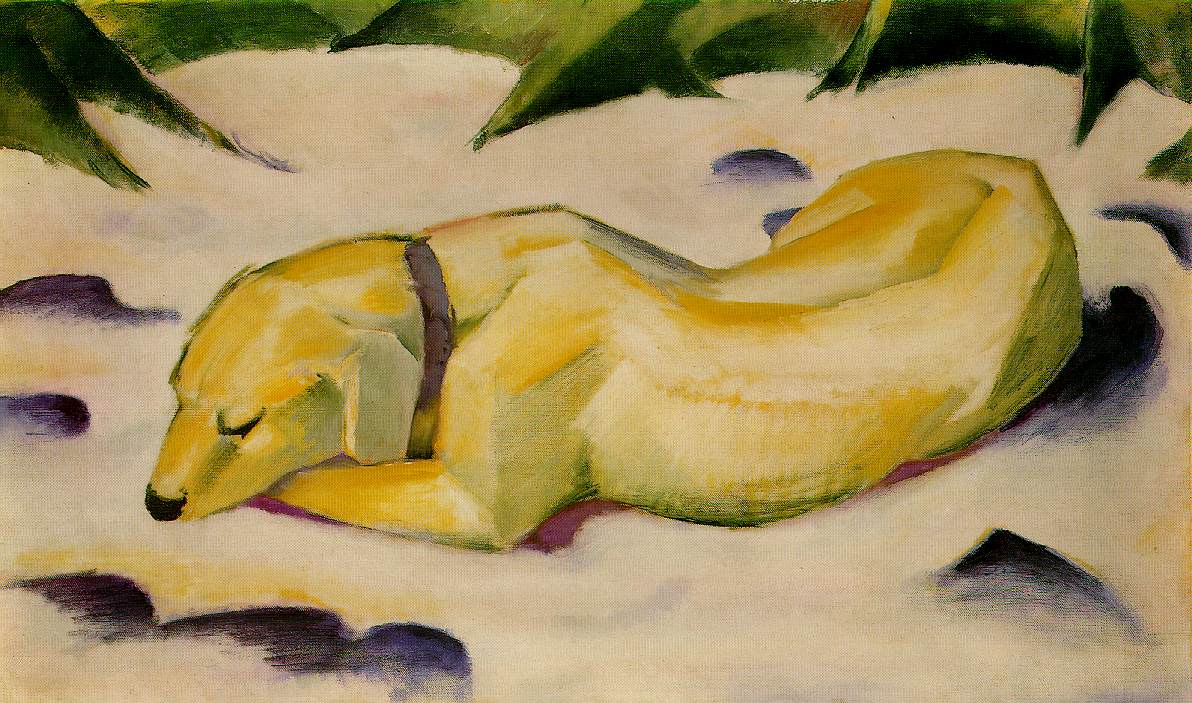
Franz Marc, Dog Lying in the Snow

== Directors ==
The directors of the Städel Museum:

- Carl Friedrich Wendelstadt 1817–1840
- Philipp Veit 1830–1843
- Johann David Passavant 1840–1861
- Gerhard Malß 1861–1885
- Georg Kohlbacher 1885–1889
- Henry Thode 1889–1891
- Heinrich Weizsäcker 1891–1904
- Ludwig Justi 1904–1905
- Georg Swarzenski 1906–1937
- Ernst Holzinger 1938–1972
- Klaus Gallwitz 1974–1994
- Herbert Beck 1994–2006
- Max Hollein 2006–2016
- Philipp Demandt since 2016

== See also ==
- Städelschule
- List of museums in Germany
- List of art museums
- Dresden Gallery, Alte Pinakothek Munich, Altes Museum Berlin

== Literature ==
- Mongi-Vollmer, Eva; Städel Museum (2007). Meisterwerke im Städel Museum ausgewählte Werke aus der Sammlung des Städel Museums (in German). Frankfurt am Main. ISBN 978-3-9809701-3-6. OCLC 199141987.
- Brinkmann, Bodo (1999). Städelsches Kunstinstitut und Städtische Galerie Frankfurt a.M. (in German). München. ISBN 978-3-7913-2204-9. OCLC 237356740.
- Brinkmann, Bodo; Kemperdick, Stephan; Städelsches Kunstinstitut (2005). Deutsche Gemälde im Städel 1500-1550 (in German). Mainz am Rhein: Von Zabern. ISBN 3-8053-3350-1. OCLC 60333359.
- Brinkmann, Bodo; Sander, Jochen (1999). Deutsche Gemälde vor 1800 im Städel (in German). Frankfurt am Main: Blick in die Welt. ISBN 3-88284-003-X. OCLC 71547451.
- Van Dyke, John Charles (1914). Munich, Frankfort, Cassel; critical notes on the Old Pinacothek, the Staedel Institute, the Cassel Royal Gallery. New York: C. Scribner's Sons. OCLC 518907.
- Baensch, Tanja (31 December 2011). "Das Museum als "lebendiger" Körper". Museum im Widerspruch. Akademie Verlag. pp. 25–92. doi:10.1524/9783050062358.25. ISBN 978-3-05-004919-9.
- Pollmer-Schmidt, Almut; Weber, Christiane; Wolf, Fabian; Städtische Galerie im Städelschen Kunstinstitut Frankfurt am Main (2021). Deutsche Gemälde im Städel Museum 1550–1725 (in German). Berlin. ISBN 978-3-422-98516-2. OCLC 1285908347.
- Städtische Galerie im Städelschen Kunstinstitut Frankfurt am Main; Engler, Martin; Hollein, Max (2012). Gegenwartskunst 1945-heute im Städel Museum (in German). Ostfildern: Hatje Cantz Verlag. ISBN 978-3-7757-3028-0. OCLC 775065939.
- Krämer, Felix; Hollein, Max; Grobien, Felicity; Lemke, Kristina; Oehsen, Kristine von; Städtische Galerie im Städelschen Kunstinstitut Frankfurt am Main (2014). Lichtbilder : Fotografie im Städel Museum von den Anfängen bis 1960 = Photography at the Städel Museum from the beginnings to 1960. Frankfurt am Main. ISBN 978-3-941399-39-6. OCLC 890127728.
- Meyer, Corina; Graf, Bernhard; Savoy, Bénédicte (2013). Die Geburt des bürgerlichen Kunstmuseums - Johann Friedrich Städel und sein Kunstinstitut in Frankfurt am Main (in German). Berlin. ISBN 978-3-940939-26-5. OCLC 868261686.
- Gallwitz, Klaus; Städtische Galerie im Städelschen Kunstinstitut Frankfurt am Main (1986). Besuche im Städel : Betrachtungen zu Bildern (in German). Frankfurt am Main: Insel. ISBN 3-458-32639-1. OCLC 30099262.
- Fleckner, Uwe; Hollein, Max (2011). Museum im Widerspruch : das Städel und der Nationalsozialismus (in German). Berlin. ISBN 978-3-05-006235-8. OCLC 754580441.
- Städtische Galerie im Städelschen Kunstinstitut Frankfurt am Main. Graphische Sammlung; Schütt, Jutta; Sonnabend, Martin; Städtische Galerie im Städelschen Kunstinstitut Frankfurt am Main (2008). Masterpieces of the Department of Prints and Drawings : drawings, watercolours and collages. Frankfurt am Main: Städel Museum. ISBN 978-3-86568-177-5. OCLC 226372377.
- Schiffer, Helen (2012). Augen für die Kunst - das neue Städel Fotografien von Hellen Schiffer, die für die Architekten Schneider + Schumacher die Baustelle des Städel Museums Frankfurt fotografisch begleitet hat; 10.02.2010 bis 15.01.2012; [anlässlich der Eröffnung des Erweiterungsbaus, Städel Museum Frankfurt am Main] (in German). Frankfurt, M. ISBN 978-3-942921-54-1. OCLC 794943152.
- Baldessari, John; Engler, Martin; Baumann, Jana (2015). John Baldessari : the Städel paintings. München: Hirmer Verlag GmbH. ISBN 978-3-7774-2449-1. OCLC 912278095.
- Gaehtgens, Thomas W.; Städelsches Kunstinstitut und Städtische Galerie (2015). ... zum Besten hiesiger Stadt und Bürgerschaft : 200 Jahre Städel; eine Festschrift (in German). München: Prestel. ISBN 978-3-7913-5452-1. OCLC 906052843.
- "Testament von 1816 des Johann Friedrich Städel dem Stifter des Frankfurter Städel Museum". Politik - Netz-Trends (in German). 3 January 2020.
