= Álvaro Urbano =

Spanish contemporary artist

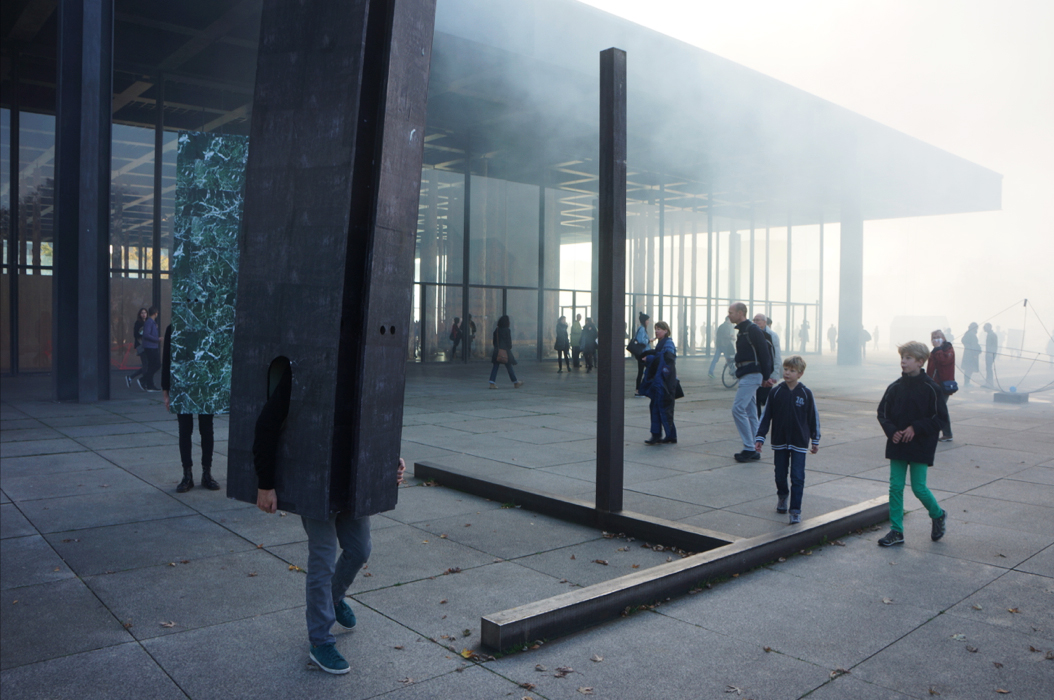
- Performance by Urbano at Neue Nationalgalerie in Berlin, Germany, 2014
- Born: 1983 (age 42–43); Madrid, Spain
- Education: ETSAM, Madrid; Universität der Künste, Berlin
- Occupation: Artist
- Known for: Sculpture, installation art, performance

Álvaro Urbano (born in Madrid, 1983) is a Spanish contemporary artist living and working in Berlin. His art is mainly known for his work with installation and sculpture.

Urbano was a teacher in the École Nationale Supérieure des Beaux-Arts in Paris, holding a joint professorship with Petrit Halilaj from 2019 until 2025.

== Life ==
Álvaro Urbano grew up in Madrid, Spain. He studied interior architecture at the ETSAM. Later he moved to New York where he started to experiment with performance art. In 2009 he moved to Berlin and started to study fine arts in the Institut für Raumexperimente of the Universität der Künste, in a class that was taught by Olafur Eliasson. Álvaro Urbano continues to work in Berlin today. In 2026 he will be a guest professor at Städelschule in Frankfurt during the summer semester.

== Work ==
Urbano's work is characterized by the creation of installations. He uses theatrical and cinematic techniques to affect the public's perception, often collaborating with lighting designers, scenographers and sound engineers to develop immersive environments. Within these spaces Urbano displays hyper-realistic sculptures that simulate plants of different types and everyday objects.

Many of the recent projects by Urbano take inspiration in forgotten or destroyed architectural spaces. For his solo exhibition El despertar, presented in 2020 at La Casa Encendida, Madrid, Urbano recreated the Pabellón de los hexágonos. This was presented by Spain at the 1958 Brussels World's Fair and it was designed by the architects José Antonio Corrales and Ramón Vázquez Molezún. The exhibition explored the possible intersections between modernist architecture and fascism, and more specifically with the Franco regime in Spain.

In 2023, Álvaro Urbano presented an exhibition in two parts in the Mexican outposts of the Spanish gallery Travesía Cuatro, in Guadalajara and Mexico City. For this project Urbano aimed to create a fictional encounter between the Spanish poet Federico García Lorca and the Mexican architect Luis Barragán. Urbano created realistic replicas of plants that can be found in Barragan's gardens and in Lorca's writings. The pairing of plants across the space suggested a possible conversation between the artists when Barragán visited the Alhambra in 1924. Urbano explained the intention of the project as follows: "my objective was to transform the two characters into botanical sculptures, and that they could have a dialogue between each other".

Urbano presented his solo exhibition TABLEAU VIVANT in SculptureCenter, Queens New York, in 2024. This project revolved around the figure of Scott Burton, a relevant figure of the New York art scene of the 70's and 80's. His legacy is mostly overlooked and many of his public sculptures are being removed or have fallen into disarray in recent times. Urbano managed to access the recently dismantled Atrium Furnishment sculptural group that was exhibited within the lobby of the AXA Equitable Center building in Manhattan. After renovations, the disassembled piece was stored in upstate New York without a clear future. Urbano managed to loan it with assistance from Jeremy Johnston, who was in charge of the rescue and posterior storage and cataloguing of the artwork. Atrium Furnishment was presented in a new arrangement within SculptureCenter along with different botanical sculptures from Urbano that are representative of the flora that can be found in The Ramble, a famous cruising spot in Central Park. Urbano intended to present this exhibition as an homage to Burton, who died from complications due to AIDS in 1989, and to bring attention to the conservation of his legacy.

=== Collaborative work with Petrit Halilaj ===
Álvaro Urbano creates collaborative works with his partner, the Kosovar artist Petrit Halilaj. They have presented exhibitions jointly in institutions such as Ocean Space, Venice (2023); the Biennale of Sydney (2024); MACBA, Barcelona (2024); among others. They started to collaborate in 2012 when they published the fanzine Kush te tu ta?, one of the first publications in the Balkans dealing with queer topics.

Urbano and Halilaj often create animal alter-egos for their projects. For their residency at MAK Center in Los Angeles (2017) the artists wore raccoon costumes to roam across the streets of the city. In 2023 and 2024, Halilaj and Urbano presented their performance Lunar Ensamble for Uprising Seas, first in Venice and later in Barcelona. The project involved a large group of metal sculptures representing different marine animals which also functioned as musical instruments. The artists dressed up as seagulls and accompanied the musicians throughout the exhibition space. In the 24th edition of the Biennale of Sydney (2024) Halilaj and Urbano dressed up as foxes wearing hyper-realistic costumes and performed within the White Bay Power Station and in different public areas of Sydney.

== Selection of solo exhibitions ==
- Tableau Vivant, SculptureCenter, New York, USA (2024)
- La eterna adolescencia, Tenerife Espacio de las Artes, Santa Cruz de Tenerife, Spain (2023)
- Granada Granada, Travesía Cuatro, Guadalajara and Mexico City, Mexico (2023)
- The Great Rings of Saturn, Storefront for Art and Architecture, New York, USA (2021)
- El despertar, La Casa Encendida, Madrid, Spain (2020)

== Selection of group exhibitions ==
- pure intention, Singapore Biennale 2025
- Whispers on the Horizon, Taipei Biennial 2025
- Tea and Dry Biscuits, Georg Kolbe Museum, Berlin, DE (2025)
- Viaje a la luna, CCA Wattis Institute for Contemporary Arts, San Francisco, USA (2025)

== Awards and recognitions ==
- Villa Romana Prize, Florence, Italy (2014)
- Villa Empain, Boghossian Foundation, Brussels, Belgium (2016)
- MAK Residency, Los Angeles, USA (2016–2017)
- Chanel Next Prize (2026)
