= Johann David Passavant =

German painter (1787–1861)

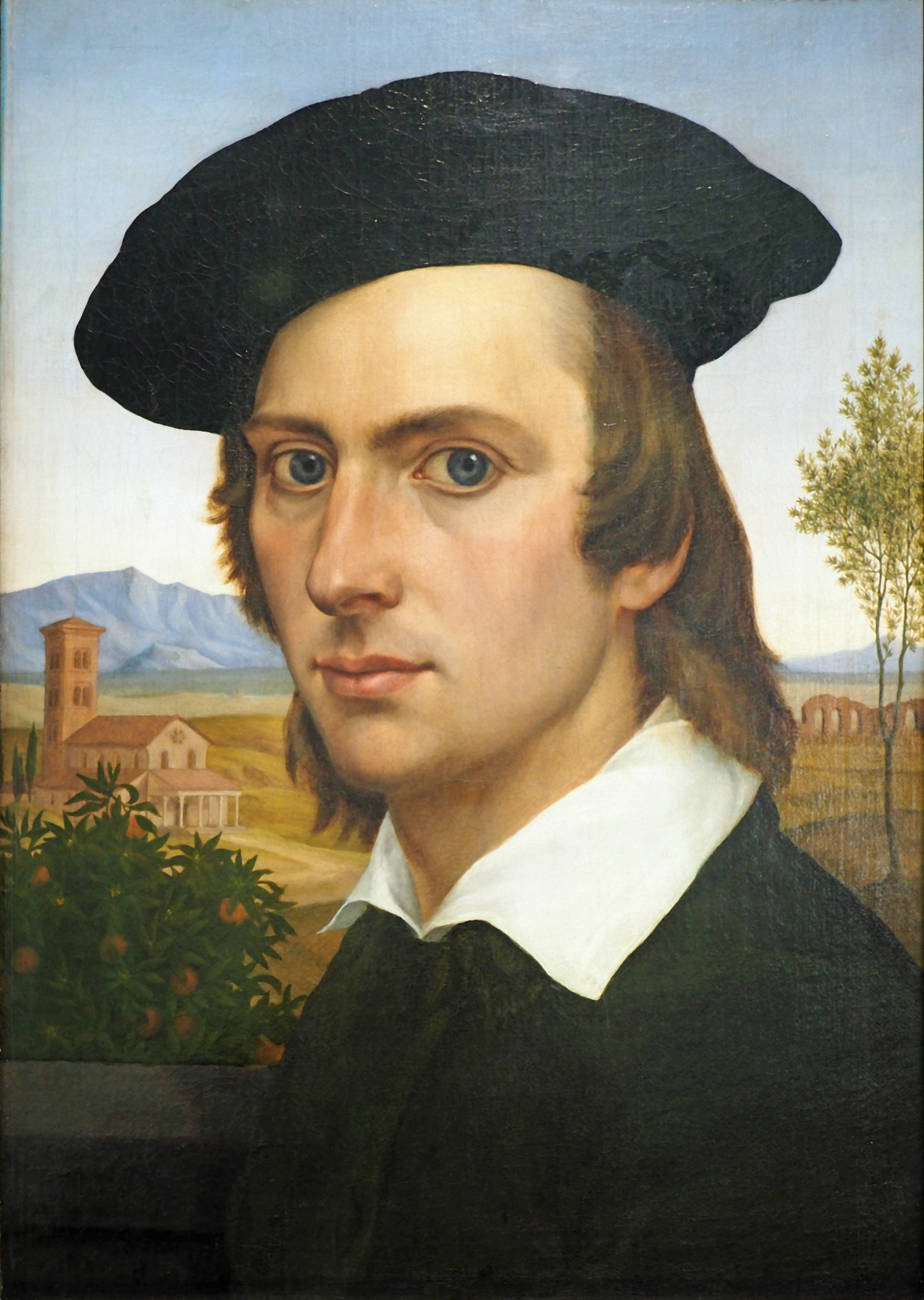
- Self-portrait
- Born: 18 September 1787; Free City of Frankfurt, Holy Roman Empire
- Died: 17 August 1861 (aged 73); Free City of Frankfurt, German Confederation
- Occupations: painter, curator
- Known for: painting

Johann David Passavant (18 September 1787 – 17 August 1861) was a German painter, curator and artist.

== Biography ==
Passavant was born in 1787 in the Free City of Frankfurt, now part of Germany. His interest in the arts was evident by an early correspondence with the artist Franz Pforr (1788–1812). He moved to Paris in 1809 to further his business interests. He returned to Frankfurt in 1824 where art history evermore occupied his interest. His Tour of a German artist in England (1833 in German; 1836 translated into English by Lady Eastlake) remains a significant source for art historians, as do his catalogues of old master prints, whose numbering is still followed by some collections.

In the year 1839 he became Inspektor (curator) of the Städelsches Kunstinstitut in Frankfurt. There he acquired important works in the prints and drawing area, mounted exhibitions, and taught. Passavant developed the three principal genres of art writing important for the next two centuries: the scholarly artistic biography, the aesthetic travelogue, and the reference survey. As a historian, he followed the romantic tradition. His paintings include Holy Family with Elizabeth and John 1819, Städtische Galerie im Städelschen Kunstinstitut, Frankfurt and A Visitation, Christ and the Samaritan c. 1820, Neue Nationalgalerie, Berlin. He died in 1861 in Frankfurt am Main.
