= Städelschule =

Art school in Frankfurt am Main, Germany

Hochschule für Bildende Künste–Städelschule
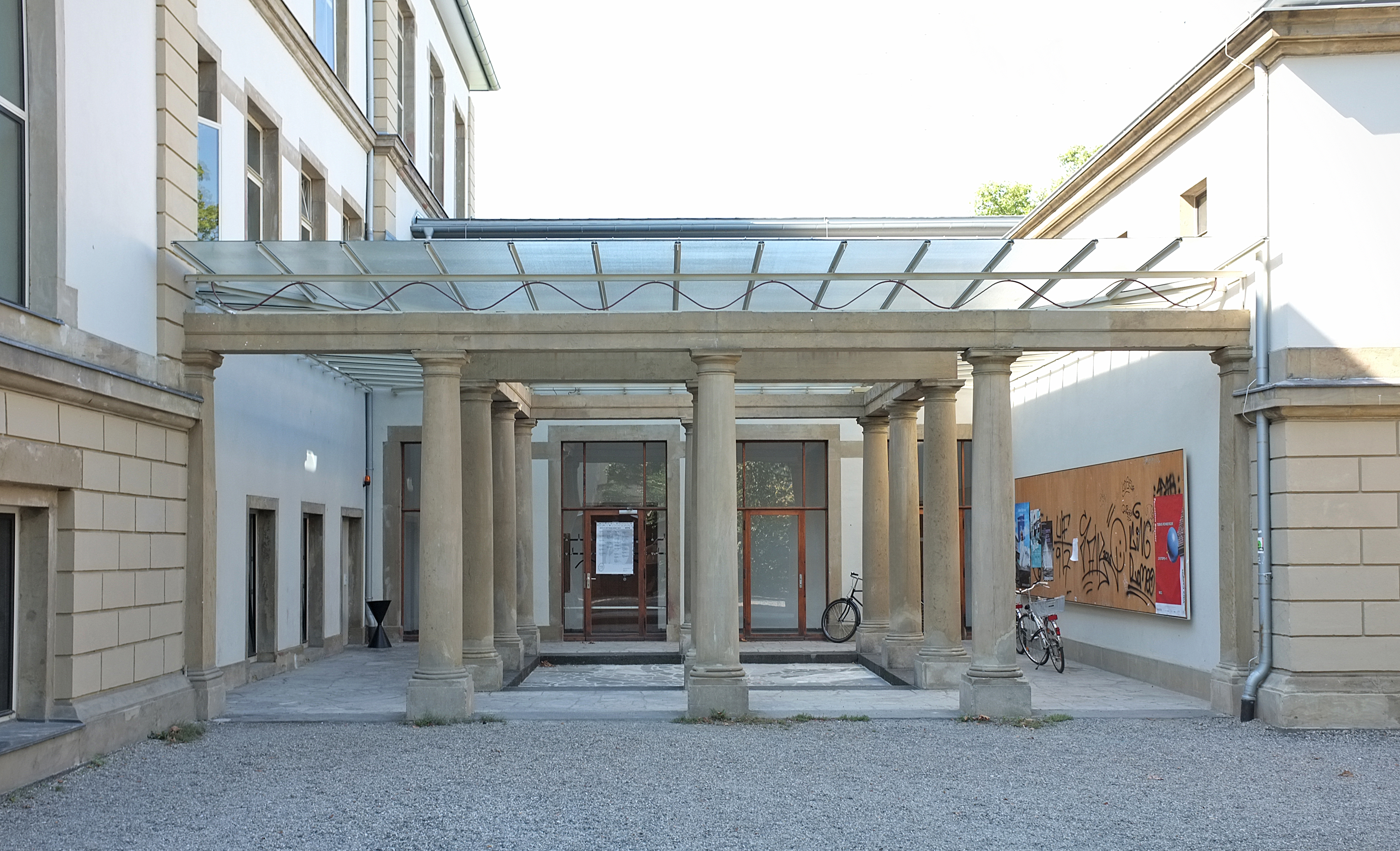
- Entrance to the school
- Former names: Städelschule Frankfurt am Main; Städelschule: Staatliche Hochschule für Bildende Künste
- Established: 1817; 209 years ago
- Founders: Städel Institute
- Rector: Barbara Clausen
- Students: about 150
- Location: Frankfurt am Main, Hesse, Germany; 50°06′08″N 08°40′30″E
- Language: English
- Website: staedelschule.de

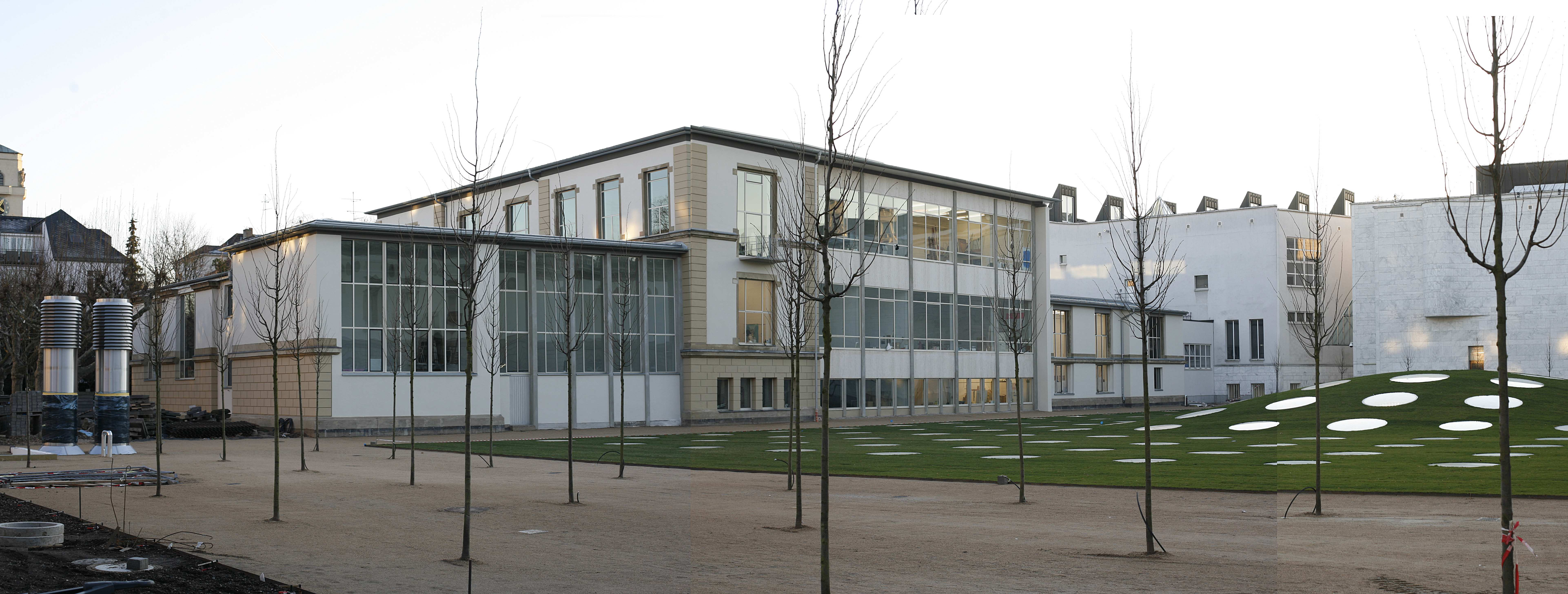
The school

The Städelschule, (Note: German pronunciation: [ˈʃtɛːdl̩ʃuːlə]) full name Hochschule für Bildende Künste–Städelschule, is a tertiary school of art in Frankfurt am Main, Germany. It accepts about 20 students each year from around 500 applicants, and has a total of approximately 150 students of visual arts; until 2020 there were also about 50 students of architecture. About 75% of the students are not from Germany, and courses are taught in English.

== History ==
The Städelschule was established by the Städel Institute in 1817, following an endowment left by Johann Friedrich Städel (1728–1816), a wealthy banker and patron of the arts. In a deed dated 15 March 1815 he left his house, his art collection and his fortune to establish a museum – now the Städel Museum – and to pay for the training in art and architecture of deserving students, in the hope that they might be "...educated to become valuable and useful citizens and artists".

Städel died on 2 December 1816, and from 1817 scholarships were given out. It was Städel's intention only that funds should be provided to pay for students' tuition at other schools, however the institute employed its first teacher, Johann Andreas Benjamin Reges (1772–1847), from 1817. He taught students in his house, and, from Summer 1817, at an orphanage; nineteen students were taught in the first year. In 1829 it was decided that the Städel Institute of Art would be an art education institute and the teachers Philipp Veit (1793–1877, painting), Friedrich Maximilian Hessemer (1800–1860, architecture) and Johann Nepomuk Zwerger (1796–1868, sculpture) were appointed. Around 1930, the Frankfurt Kunstgewerbeschule (established 1878) was incorporated into the Städelschule.

The school was later taken over by the city of Frankfurt. Until the end of 2018 it was the only tertiary institution in Germany to be funded by a city rather than state administration; in 2007 it received €3.8 million from the city. From 1 January 2019 the school became an educational institution of the state of Hesse, and is funded by that state.

Günther Bock succeeded Johannes Krahn as head of the architecture class in 1972, and in 1978 started a postgraduate course entitled Konzeptionelles Entwerfen ('conceptual design'), from which the Master of Advanced Design course later developed. The architecture department was later led by Peter Cook, Enric Miralles, Ben van Berkel and Johan Bettum. It was not funded by the state of Hesse, and was closed down in October 2020 for reasons associated with the COVID-19 pandemic.

== Teaching staff ==
Many noted artists teach or have taught at the school. Max Beckmann taught there during the Weimar Republic, but was classed as a "degenerate artist" and dismissed from his position under the Nazi régime; his work was shown in the Degenerate Art Exhibition of 1937.

In 2026 Willem de Rooij, Haegue Yang, Gerard Byrne, Hassan Khan and Tobias Rehberger were among the teaching staff. Guest professors have included Andrea Fraser, Álvaro Urbano and Sung Tieu. Rectors in the last fifty years have included Raimer Jochims, Peter Kubelka, Kasper König, Daniel Birnbaum, Nikolaus Hirsch, Philippe Pirotte and Yasmil Raymond.
