= Petrit Frrokaj =

Swiss footballer (born 1985)

Personal information
- Full name: Petrit Frrokaj
- Date of birth: 16 January 1985 (age 41)
- Height: 1.83 m (6 ft 0 in)
- Position: Midfielder

Team information
- Current team: BSC Old Boys

Senior career*
Years	Team	Apps	(Gls)
2004–2006	FC Baden	50	(2)
2006–2008	FC Locarno	43	(3)
2008–	BSC Old Boys		
- * Club domestic league appearances and goals

Petrit Frrokaj (born 16 January 1985) is a Swiss footballer of Albanian descent. He plays for BSC Old Boys.
