= Hocaoğlu =

Hocaoğlu is a Turkish surname. Notable people with the surname include:

- Ece Hocaoğlu (born 1994), Turkish volleyball player
- Hakkı Hocaoğlu (born 1975), Turkish football player
- Meltem Hocaoğlu (born 1992), Turkish female karateka
- Tuğçe Hocaoğlu (born 1988), Turkish female volleyball player

== See also ==
- Hocaoğlu, Bartın
- Hocaoğlu, Düzce
