= Mihail Simeonov =

Bulgarian artist (1929–2021)

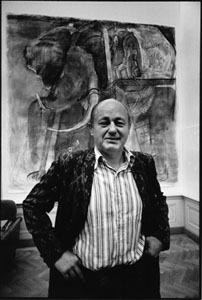
Mihail Simeonov (1983)

Mihail Asen Simeonov (Bulgarian: Михаил Симеонов) (May 31 1929 – December 29 2021) was a Bulgarian-born artist who moved to Tunis, then New York City, and finally Pawtucket, Rhode Island.

He is best known for his Cast the Sleeping Elephant Project, a life-size bronze statue of an African elephant. It was produced by making an alginate cast in 1980 of a live, wild Kenyan elephant bull, which survived the 72-minute process unharmed. The bronze statue made from the cast was inaugurated in 1998 by UN Secretary General Kofi Annan and is installed outside UN Headquarters in New York.

Simeonov v. Tiegs, a lawsuit that Simeonov brought in 1993 against model Cheryl Tiegs, is a leading case in the field of artists' rights under U.S. law. The court held that Simeonov's First Amendment right to free speech in making casts of Tiegs's body outweighed her right to privacy.

Since 2005, Simeonov resided in Pawtucket, Rhode Island. In September 2019, to celebrate his 75th anniversary as a practicing sculptor, he was honored with an exhibit in Pawtucket City Hall as well a Key to the City presented by Mayor Donald Grebian.
