= Petrit Halilaj =

Kosovar visual artist

- Born: 1986 (age 39–40); Kostërc, District of Mitrovica, Kosovo
- Known for: sculpture, installation art

Petrit Halilaj (born 1986) is a Kosovar visual artist living and working between Germany, Kosovo, and Italy. The name "Petrit" literally means "Falcon". His work is based on documents, stories, and memories related to the history of Kosovo.

With his husband Alvaro Urbano, Halilaj is a joint tutor at Beaux-Arts de Paris, in Paris, France.

== Early life ==
Born in SFR Yugoslavia, now Kosovo, Halilaj left the country at the age of 13 with his family during the Yugoslav Wars of 1991–2001. At a refugee camp in Albania, a team of Italian psychologists, hoping to help the children process the trauma of the war, gave Halilaj felt-tip markers, with which he began to make drawings about his experiences.

Settled in Italy, Halilaj studied at the Brera Academy of Fine Arts in Milan.

== Career ==
During the 6th Berlin Biennale in 2010, Halilaj exhibited a sculptural reconstruction of a house built by his parents, to replace the family home that was levelled by bombing during the 1998–1999 Kosovo war.

Halilaj represented the Republic of Kosovo at the 55th Venice Biennale in 2013.

Halilaj had several solo exhibitions, including one at the New Museum in New York in 2017–2018 and one at the Hammer Museum in Los Angeles in 2018–2019.

Halilaj created a large site-specific installation of giant sculptural flowers in 2020 for Madrid's Palacio de Cristal.

In 2020 Halilaj dropped out of the 58th October Salon – Belgrade Biennale, claiming that the Cultural Center of Belgrade, which organises it, would not recognize his Kosovar nationality.

In July 2021, Halilaj and Urbano collaborated on an installation of "huge fabric flowers" at the Kosovo National Library to celebrate the 5th annual Kosovo Pride Week. According to the New York Times:

[The flowers] included a replica of a lily that had been part of [Urbano and Halilaj's] engagement bouquet. Kosovo is still a macho society, Halilaj said, yet no one had "thrown tomatoes" or protested against the artists' celebration of gay love. "When this happened, under the flowers, I felt home for the first time in my life."

In October 2021, an exhibit opened at Tate St Ives of an installation by Halilaj inspired by his youthful marker drawings done in the refugee camp.

He revisited the pictures [in 2020] and was surprised by what he'd drawn. Among the violence, he said, "I saw all these birds — peacocks and doves — and they were as big as the soldiers, as happy and proud. ... It was like I was saying, 'Yes, it was awful, but I can dream and love, too.'"

In the exhibit, visitors walk among hanging cutouts of images from the drawings blown up to a huge scale. Approached from the entrance, the cutouts show "a fantasy landscape of exotic birds and palm trees," but when the visitors turn back to the entrance, "they find that some of the suspended forms have been printed on the reverse with a more macabre selection of Halilaj's doodles: soldiers, tanks, wailing figures, burning houses."

== Exhibitions ==
- 2009 – Back to the Future, curated by Albert Heta, at Stacion – Center for Contemporary Art Prishtina, Pristina, Kosovo
- 2018–2019 – Hammer Projects: Petrit Halilaj, organised by adjunct curator Ali Subotnick and curatorial associate MacKenzie Stevens, at Hammer Museum, Los Angeles, CA, USA
- 2018–2019 – Shkrepëtima, curated by Leonardo Bigazzi, at Fondazione Merz, Turin, Italy
- 2020 – To a raven and hurricanes that from unknown places bring back smells of humans in love, Palacio de Cristal, Madrid
- 2023 – Runik, Museo Tamayo, Mexico City, Mexico
- 2024 – The Roof Garden Commission: Abetare, at Metropolitan Museum of Art, New York, USA
- 2024 – Ensamble lunar para mares al alza, at MACBA, Barcelona, Spain (with Álvaro Urbano)
- 2025 - An Opera of Our Time, at Hamburger Bahnhof, Berlin, Germany
- 2026 – Who does the earth belong to while painting the wind?!, ChertLüdde, Berlin, Germany

== Collections ==
- Centre Pompidou, Paris, France
- Museo Ettore Fico, Turin, Italy
- Museum of Contemporary Art Chicago, Chicago, IL, USA
- Museum of Modern Art, Warsaw, Warsaw, Poland
- Tate Modern, London, UK

== Awards ==
Halilaj received the Mario Merz Prize and a special mention of the jury at the 57th Venice Biennale, both in 2017. He did a Smithsonian Artist Research Fellowship, Washington, D.C. in 2018. Halilaj received the Kunstpreis Berlin awarded by the Akademie der Künste, Berlin, in 2023. On 2 October 2025, Halilaj was named the 2027 Nasher Prize Laureate by the Nasher Sculpture Center, Dallas, Texas. The Prize comes with a "$100,000 and the opportunity to devise public programming with the Nasher Sculpture Center."
