= Petrit Hoxhaj =

Dutch footballer

Personal information
- Date of birth: 5 February 1990 (age 36)
- Place of birth: Cërmjan, SFR Yugoslavia
- Position: Midfielder

Youth career
- Grootegast
- 2003–2009: Groningen

Senior career*
Years	Team	Apps	(Gls)
2009–2012	Veendam	37	(2)
2012–2013	WKE	4	(0)
2013–2014	Be Quick 1887	19	(1)
2014–2017	Pelikaan-S		
2017–2019	Katwijk	14	(0)
2019	ACV		
2020–2023	PKC '83		
- * Club domestic league appearances and goals as of 7 April 2021

Petrit Hoxhaj (born 5 February 1990) is a Dutch retired footballer who played as a midfielder.

== Career ==
In 1994, Hoxhaj's family fled from Kosovo to the Netherlands. He played youth football at amateur club FC Grootegast, and from 2002 at FC Groningen. In 2003 his family was threatened with deportation. In 2009, he exchanged the youth academy of Groningen for SC Veendam. Hoxhaj made his debut on 12 March 2010 against Volendam, coming on as a substitute in the 82nd minute for Lars Lambooij. A year later, on 4 March 2011, the midfielder scored his first goal for Veendam in a 4–1 win against Fortuna Sittard.

Hoxhaj played in the lower tiers of Dutch football, after leaving Veendam in 2012. First, he played one season for WKE, before moving to Be Quick 1887. He then joined Pelikaan-S who had recently been promoted to the ninth-tier Vierde Klasse in March 2014. There, he would play alongside former professional players such as FC Groningen legend Martin Drent and Kurt Elshot, and reach successive promotions. Following three years at the club, he moved to VV Katwijk in March 2017. Already in April 2019 it was confirmed, at Hoxhaj would join ACV Assen in the Dutch Hoofdklasse from the 2019–20 season. In April 2020, it was announced that he would join Eerste Klasse club PKC '83 together with his brother Handrit Hoxhaj.

== Personal life ==
After retiring from professional football, Hoxhaj continued working as an account manager at IT advisor Bossers & Cnossen in Groningen.
