= Romanian name =

A name in Romanian tradition consists of a given name (prenume) and a family name (surname) (nume or nume de familie). In official documents, surnames usually appear before given names.

== Given names ==
Romanians have one, two, or more given names, e.g. Ana Cristina Maria (three given names), all being chosen by the child's parents. One of them, usually the first, is used in daily life while the others are solely for official documents, such as birth, marriage, or death certificates.

=== Saints ===
Traditionally, most people were given names from the Romanian Orthodox calendar of saints. Common names of this type are Ion or Andrei for males and Maria or Elena for females. Given names with a Christian lineage have an identifiable English equivalent: Andrei (Andrew), Constantin (Constantine), Cristian (Christian), Daniel/Dan (Daniel/Dan), Gheorghe/George (George), Grigore (Gregory), Ilie (Elijah), Ion/Ioan (John), Iacob (Jacob/James), Iosif (Joseph), Laurențiu (Lawrence), Luca (Luke), Marcu (Mark), Matei (Matthew), Mihail/Mihai (Michael), Nicolae/Niculaie (Nicholas), Pavel/Paul (Paul), Petru/Petre (Peter), Ștefan (Stephen), Vasile (Basil).

The most common name, Maria is the equivalent of Mary. Maria has led to many closely related names such as Mariana, Marioara, Maricica, Maricela, Măriuca, Mara, Marina, Marilena, Marieta, Marinela, Marisa, Marița, Marusia, Mia, Mioara. Over 2,6 million Romanians have the name Maria or another name derived from it (1.486.913 women are named Maria, and there are also 316.800 men named Marian, as of 2024). Also, over 2 million Romanians have a name derived from Ioan (John) (eg. Ioan, Ion, Ionuţ, Ionel, Ioana, Ionela).

=== Roman names ===
Roman heritage is reflected in Roman given names such as Traian (Trajan), Titus, Marius, Octavian, Ovidiu (Ovid), Aurel (Aurelius), Cornel (Cornelius), Liviu (Livius) etc. Such names are common especially in Transylvania. During the Hungarian rule of Transylvania, a policy of Magyarization encouraged the translation of personal names into Hungarian. Adopting Classical Roman names with a difficult equivalence in Hungarian was a method of Romanian nationalist resistance. Dacian heritage is reflected through the name Decebal (from king Decebalus), or Dacian/Daciana.

=== Nature-inspired names ===
Some names are inspired from nature, such as Sorin/Sorina (soare, "sun"), Codruț/Codruța or Codrin/Codrina (codru, "woods"), or flowers: Crin/Crina, Narcis/Narcisa, Viorel/Viorica, Anemona, Brândușa, Camelia, Iolanda, Lăcrămioara etc. The word floare ("flower") has led to several names such as Florin/Florina, Florentin/Florentina, Florian/Floriana, Florica, Floarea.

Traditional Romanian names which come from Romanian words include Doina which means "doina", a traditional Romanian musical tune style, or Luminița, meaning "little light", from the word "lumină" (light). The name Lăcrămioara refers to the name of a flower (lily of the valley), but also means "little tear", from the word "lacrimă" (tear). Crenguța means "little branch", from the word "creangă" (branch).

=== Slavic names ===
Slavic influence on Romanian is present at all linguistic levels, including names. These include names containing the Slavic root -mir. Examples of Slavic names in Romanian, or names introduced from the surrounding Slavic areas, include Bogdan, Dragoș, Mircea, Radu, Tihomir, Vlad, Vladislav, Vladimir, Miroslav, Casimir, Anastasia, Irina, Milena, Olga, Raisa.

Some common names are the names born by historical rulers (domnitori/voievozi), such Ștefan (Ștefan cel Mare), Mihai (Mihai Viteazu), Mircea (Mircea cel Bătrân), Vlad (Vlad Țepeș), Rareș (Petru Rareș), although not all parents make such associations, especially when the name is that of a Christian saint.

Alexandru/Alexandra are very common names. They also include the variants of Alex, Alexia, Alexandrina, or the 'foreign' variants of Alessia, Alessandra, Alexa (see below).

=== Spanish and Italian names ===
In the 1990s, as telenovelas started to be broadcast in Romania, Spanish/Latin American names have become popular; and the trend of giving children such names has been reinforced by the migration or travel of parents to Spain or Italy. As such, names like Mario, Antonio, Alberto, Esmeralda, Gianni, Giovanni, Alessia etc. are relatively common. Indeed, Mario, Antonio and Alessia were in the top 50 as baby names in 2009. Carmen may be a Spanish influence but was also popular earlier due to the pseudonym Carmen Sylva.

=== Trends ===
The prevalence of given names follows trends, with some names being popular in some years, and some considered definitely out-of-fashion. As an example, few children born since 1980 would bear the names of Gheorghe, Vasile, or Ilie, which are generally associated with the idea of an elderly man (while the name of Gheorghe is rare among the younger generation, the variant George is more common). However, such "old-fashioned" names are sometimes used as middle names. By contrast, some names are associated with the younger generations: for example the feminine name Andreea become popular from the 1970s onwards, being one of the most common given names in the younger generations, ranking third in popularity among feminine names given to children born in 1989, second in 2009, and fourth in 2014.

=== Compound names ===
Compound given names are uncommon, with only one notable exception, i.e. Ana-Maria (sometimes spelled Anamaria). In that case this is not considered to be two separate given names. Diminutives are often used as names (e.g. Ionuţ, Ionel, Ionela, Anişoara). Ionuţ, a diminutive from Ion/Ioan, is one of the most common names in Romania. It ranked second in popularity among male names given to children born in 1989, third in 2009, ninth in 2014, and eighth in 2022.

=== Name genders ===
Romanian male given names end in a consonant (Adrian, Ion, Paul, Ștefan, Victor) or in any vowel other than -a (Alexandru, Andrei, Mihai), with some exceptions (Mircea, Mihnea), while almost all female names end in -a (Ana, Elena, Ioana, Maria), with only very few exceptions such as Carmen. This is most easily seen in the male-female name pairs: Gabriel-Gabriela, Ioan-Ioana, George-Georgiana, Mihai-Mihaela, Nicolae-Nicoleta, etc.

=== Common names ===
The most common Romanian name is Maria, with approximately 1.38 million females having it as one of their given names. Also, almost 1.37 million Romanians have Ion, Ioan and Ioana as one of their given names. The most common names are:

- For males: Alexandru, Adrian, Andrei, Mihai, Ionuţ, Florin, Daniel, Marian, Marius, Cristian for all males. For boys born in 2022 they are: Andrei, Ștefan, Matei, Gabriel, Alexandru, David, Ioan, Ionuț, Nicolas, Luca.
- For females: Ana-Maria, Mihaela, Andreea, Elena, Alexandra, Cristina, Daniela, Alina, Maria, Ioana for all females. For girls born in 2022, they are: Maria, Ioana, Elena, Ștefania, Sofia, Anastasia, Andreea, Eva, Antonia, Gabriela.

=== Changes ===
The given name can be changed on request, but it is necessary to prove a legitimate interest for the change (usually that the current name is a cause of mockery etc.).

== Surnames ==
Like in most of Europe, in Romania it is customary for a child to take the father's surname, and a wife her husband's surname. In cases where paternity is not established, the child takes the mother's surname. The law however is flexible, allowing for the couple to choose their family name, and thus the surname they would use for all their children. Typically it is the father's surname (in keeping with the tradition), but parents may also opt to use the mother's surname; or for both of the spouses to have both surnames; or for one spouse to use a double-barrelled name. Romanian law does not require any of the spouses to change their surname, but in practice in most families both spouses will have the husband's original surname. If parents have different surnames, a child will have either the surname of one of them, or both surnames.

Romanian surnames remain the same regardless of the sex of the person (unlike in Slavic languages, for example, where surnames have different forms for men and women).

After a divorce, the spouse who changed the surname (usually the wife) will generally revert to the original surname. However, the married surname can be retained, either with the consent of both spouses, or by court order. If the other spouse does not consent to the retaining of the surname, the spouse who wants to retain it can petition the court and ask it for permission. The relevant laws are Art. 282, Art. 383 Art. 449 Art. 450. of the Civil Code of Romania.

Until the 19th century, the names were primarily of the form "[given name] [father's name] [grandfather's name]". The few exceptions are usually famous people or the nobility (boyars). The name reform introduced around 1850 had the names changed to a western style consisting of a given name followed by a family name (surname). As such, the name is called prenume, while the family name is called nume or, when otherwise ambiguous, nume de familie ("family name"). Middle names (second given names) are also fairly common.

Many Romanian names are derivative forms obtained by the addition of some traditional Romanian suffixes, such as -așcu, -escu (Marinescu), -ăscu, -eanu (Largeanu), -anu, -an (Zizian), -aru, -atu, or -oiu. These uniquely Romanian suffixes strongly identify ancestral nationality.

Historically, when the family name reform was introduced in the mid-19th century, the default was to use a patronym, or a matronym when the father was dead or unknown. A typical derivation was to append suffixes like -escu or -așcu to the father's name, e.g. Ionescu ("Ion's child") and Petrescu ("Petre's child") or Pătrașcu ("Petru's child") and Ghițăraşcu ("Ghiță's child"). The suffix -escu is derived from Latin -iscum, and cognate with Italian -esco and French -esque.

Another common derivation was to append the suffix -eanu or the simpler forms -anu and -an to the name of a place, river, village, or region, e.g. Ardeleanu (from Ardeal), Moldoveanu (from Moldova), Mureșanu (from the Mureș River), Sadoveanu (from Sadova) etc. (cognate to Italian -(i)ano). They may indicate a country or ethnic origin (e.g. Grecu - from Greece, Ungureanu - from Hungary, Rusu - from Russia, Sârbu - from Serbia, Turcu - from Turkey). https://en.wikipedia.org/wiki/Lupu The suffix -cea (as in Mihalcea, Grigorcea, Neculcea, Oncea, etc.) is Slavic.

Furthermore, the Slavic influence on Romanian has manifested itself by way of the emergence of Romanian surnames of Slavic origin (as in Chirilov, Covaci, Levandovschi, Marcovici, Novac, Popoviciu, etc.).

There are also descriptive family names derived from occupations or nicknames, e.g. Ciobanu ("shepherd"), Păcuraru ("pitch-maker", "pitch-vendor"), Croitoru ("tailor"), Fieraru ("smith"), Moraru ("miller"), Bălan ("blond"), Țăranu ("peasant") etc. Also some Romanian surnames come from various animals and plants, most probably being former nicknames, with or without the addition of various suffixes, e.g. Bourean(u) ("ox"), Căpreanu ("goat"), Jderoiu ("marten"), Lupu ("wolf"), Ursu ("bear"), Zimbrean ("bison"), Vidraru ("otter"). Some surnames come from colors: e.g. Roșu ("red"), Negru ("black"), Albu ("white").

The most common Romanians surnames in 2007 were Popa (191,938 people), meaning "priest" and Popescu (147,784 people), meaning "priest's son/daughter".

== Usage in official documents ==
Currently, multiple given names have to be separated by a hyphen symbol ("-") on birth certificates and other civil status documents. For short period of time the law permitted multiple given names being registered without hyphen separation (between Government Ordinance 80/2011 and Law 61/2012) but the Law 61/2012 reverted to the original convention where hyphens are used to separate all given names (such as first name and middle name(s)), and separately the same is true for all surnames/last names. This naming convention is used in Romanian official documents to reduce any confusion related to middle names. Without the hyphen convention, a middle name could be interpreted either as a second given name/middle name or a first surname.

Because of this practice, the Romanian ID document ("Carte de Identitate"/"Buletin") and the Romanian passport typically use the same naming convention, although the law covers birth certificates and civil status documents only. However, many other documents (such as the driver license or any legal document) may or may not use hyphens.

Citizens that have been born overseas may be allowed to use their names as recorded in the original foreign document.

== See also ==
- Surnames by country § Romania
- List of most common surnames in Europe § Romania

== Sources ==
- Felecan, Oliviu (15 March 2012). Name and Naming: Synchronic and Diachronic Perspectives. Cambridge Scholars Publishing. pp. 407–. ISBN 978-1-4438-3807-8.
- Hasdeǔ, Bogdan Petriceǐcǔ (1898). Etymologicum magnum Romaniæ. Stab. grafic Socec & Teclu.
