= Bechet (disambiguation) =

Bechet is a town in Romania.

Bechet may also refer to:

== Places ==
- Bechet, a village in Orodel Commune, Dolj County, Romania
- Bechet, a village in Bobicești Commune, Olt County, Romania
- Bechet, a tributary of the Ghimbav (river), Romania
- Bechet (crater), on Mercury

== People ==
- Étienne Nicolas Marie Béchet, Sieur de Rochefontaine, birth name of Stephen Rochefontaine (1755–1814), French aristocrat and American military engineer
- Ron Bechet (born 1956), American artist
- Sidney Bechet (1897–1959), American jazz musician

== See also ==
- Behçet (disambiguation)
