= Lupulescu =

Lupulescu is a Romanian-language surname: lup (=wolf) + -ul (Romanian definite article, making lupul="the wolf") + -escu (patronymic suffix). It may also be transcribed via Cyrillic alphabet and back to Latin as Lupulesku. Notable people with this surname include:

- Constantin Lupulescu
- Ilija Lupulesku
- Jasna Lupulesku, name by the first marriage of Jasna Fazlić, Yugoslavian-American table tennis player
