= Romanian numbers =

Names of numbers in the Romanian language

Romanian numbers are the system of number names used in Romanian to express counts, quantities, ranks in ordered sets, fractions, multiplication, and other information related to numbers.

In Romanian grammar, the words expressing numbers are sometimes considered a separate part of speech, called numeral (plural: numerale), along with nouns, verbs, etc. (Note that the English word "numeral" can mean both the symbols used for writing numbers and the names of those numbers in a given language; also, Romanian număr only partially overlaps in meaning with English number.) Nevertheless, these words play the same roles in the sentence as they do in English: adjective, pronoun, noun, and adverb. This article focuses on the mechanism of naming numbers in Romanian and the use of the number names in sentences.

The symbols for numbers in Romanian texts are the same as those used in English, with the exception of using the comma as the decimal separator and the period or the space (ideally a narrow space) for grouping digits by three in large numbers. For example, in Romanian 1,5 V means one and a half volts, and 1.000.000 or 1 000 000 means one million.

== General characteristics ==
As in other numeral systems, the Romanian number names use a limited set of words and combining rules, which can be applied to generate the name of any number within sufficiently large limits.

The general characteristics of the number formation rules in Romanian are:

- The numeration base used is decimal.
- Word order is big-endian with the exception of numbers from 11 to 19.
- Large numbers use a combined form of the long and short scales.
- Connection words are used in certain situations.
- Some number names have two gender-specific forms.

== Cardinal numbers ==
Cardinal numbers are the words we use for counting objects or expressing quantity.

=== Number name for 0 ===
The number 0 is called zero. Like in English, it requires the plural form of nouns: zero grade "zero degrees", with grade being the plural form of grad). Unlike English, the reading of number/numeral 0 is always zero and never replaced with words like oh, naught, nil, love, etc.

=== Numbers from 1 to 10 ===
The number names from 1 to 10 derive from Latin. The table below gives the cardinal numbers in Romanian and the three other Eastern Romance languages (sometimes considered to be its dialects): Aromanian, Megleno-Romanian and Istro-Romanian.

Number	Romanian	Aromanian	Megleno-Romanian	Istro-Romanian	Latin
1	unu^{1}	unu^{1}	unu^{1}	ur^{1}	unus
2	doi^{1}	doi^{1}	doi^{1}	doi^{1}	duo
3	trei	trei	trei	trei	tres
4	patru	patru	patru	påtru	quattuor
5	cinci	ținți^{2}	ținți	ținț	quinque
6	șase	șase	șasi	șåse	sex
7	șapte^{3}	șapte	șapti	șåpte	septem
8	opt	optu	uopt	opt	octo
9	nouă	noauă	nou	devet^{4}	novem
10	zece	zațe	zeți	deset^{4}	decem

Notes

1. When counting, the number names for 1 and 2 have the forms given in the table; however, when used in a sentence, they change according to the gender of the noun they modify or replace. It is worth noting that the two adjectival forms of the cardinal number for 1 (un and o) are identical with the corresponding indefinite articles.

- un băiat "one boy, a boy",
- unul dintre băieți "one of the boys",
- o fată "one girl, a girl",
- una dintre fete "one of the girls",
- doi băieți "two boys",
- două fete "two girls".

2. The name for number five in Aromanian, written ținți or tsintsi, might be responsible for nicknaming the Aromanians țințar.

3. Sometimes pronounced as șepte (initially a regionalism), more common when communicating telephone numbers, in order to avoid a possible confusion between șase and șapte.

4. In Istro-Romanian, depending on the speaker, some number names are replaced with their Croatian (Slavic) equivalents.

=== Numbers from 11 to 19 ===
Unlike all other Romance languages, Romanian has a consistent way of naming the numbers from 11 to 19. These are obtained by joining three elements: the units, the word spre (derived from Latin super "over", but now meaning "towards" in Romanian), and the word for "ten". For example, fifteen is cincisprezece cinci + spre + zece, which literally means "five over ten". This is the only exception to the big-endian principle of number naming.

The table below gives the forms of all nine such number names. Each number in the series has one or more shortened variants, often used in informal speech, where the element '-sprezece is replaced by -șpe. Prescriptive grammarians consider the informal variants to be indicative of careless speech.

Number	Formal Romanian	Informal Romanian	Aromanian
11	unsprezece	unșpe	unsprăd̦ațe
12	doisprezece^{1}	doișpe	doisprăd̦ațe
13	treisprezece	treișpe	treisprăd̦ațe
14	paisprezece^{2}	paișpe	pasprăd̦ațe
15	cincisprezece^{3}	cinșpe (not cincișpe)	tsisprăd̦ațe
16	șaisprezece^{2}	șaișpe	șasprăd̦ațe
17	șaptesprezece	șapteșpe, șaptișpe	șaptesprăd̦ațe
18	optsprezece^{4}	optișpe, optâșpe/optîșpe, opșpe	optusprăd̦ațe
19	nouăsprezece	nouășpe	naosprăd̦ațe

Notes

1. The number name for 12 given in the table is the masculine form; this is the only number in this range that also has a feminine form: douăsprezece (informal douășpe). However, the masculine form is sometimes used even with feminine nouns, especially when the number follows the noun it determines, as in ora doisprezece "12 o'clock" or clasa a doisprezecea ("12th grade", see below for ordinal numbers); such use is considered incorrect.

2. Number names for 14 and 16 do not exactly follow the forming rule, possibly under the influence of the number names for 12 and 13. The forms patrusprezece and șasesprezece do exist, but are perceived as hypercorrect and very rarely used (one might hear them in telephone conversations, for the sake of correct transmission).

3. Instead of cincisprezece sometimes cinsprezece is used.

4. The number name for 18 is notorious for being the word in Romanian with the longest consonant cluster (five consonants with no intervening vowels): ptspr, split into two syllables, opt-spre-ze-ce. For this reason, the variants opsprezece (with a missing t) and optâsprezece/optîsprezece or optisprezece (with an additional vowel to break the consonant cluster) are frequent.

=== Numbers from 20 to 99 ===
The numbers in this range that are multiple of 10 (that is, 20, 30, ..., 90) are named by joining the number of tens with the word zeci (the plural of zece), as shown in the table below. Note that they are spelled as a single word.

Number	Romanian	Aromanian
20	douăzeci	yinghiț^{3}
30	treizeci	treid̦îți
40	patruzeci	patrud̦îți
50	cincizeci^{1}	țind̦îți
60	șaizeci^{2}	șaid̦îți
70	șaptezeci	șaptid̦îți
80	optzeci^{1}	opd̦îți
90	nouăzeci	naud̦îți

Notes

1. Cincizeci is often pronounced (but not written) cinzeci. Similarly, optzeci is often pronounced obzeci.

2. șaizeci does not follow the formation rule exactly. The expected form șasezeci does not exist.

3. This is a direct descendant of Latin vīgintī, which did not survive in Romanian.

The other numbers between 20 and 99 are named by combining three words: the number of tens, the conjunction și "and", and the units. For example, 42 is patruzeci și doi.

For those numbers whose unit figure is 1 or 2 the corresponding number name has two gender-dependent forms:

- masculine: treizeci și unu de bărbați "31 men"; treizeci și doi de bărbați "32 men";
- feminine: treizeci și una de femei "31 women"; treizeci și două de femei "32 women";
- neuter: treizeci și unu de grade "31 degrees"; treizeci și două de grade "32 degrees".

==== Short versions ====
The numbers from 20 to 99 also have an informal, simplified pronunciation: The part zeci shortens to ș /ʃ/ when the units name starts with an unvoiced consonant or a vowel. For 50 and 80 this contraction is incomplete, zeci reducing only to zeș. When the next word starts with a voiced consonant the same rule applies except that ș is pronounced voiced as j /ʒ/. The same rule applies if the units number is 0 and if the next word is the preposition de. Examples:

- șaptezeci și cinci → șapteșcinci ("75");
- cincizeci și unu → cinzeșunu ("51");
- optzeci și opt → obzeșopt ("88");
- treizeci și doi → treijdoi ("32");
- douăzeci de ori → douăjde ori ("20 times").

In regional speech further simplification is possible (cincizeci și becoming cinș and optzeci și becoming opș). Also, the number 48, when it refers to the revolutions of 1848, is pronounced pașopt, which also gave words like pașoptist (meaning "participant in the Romanian 1848 Revolution" or "supporter of its ideology").

=== Numbers from 100 to 999 ===
Any given number from 100 to 999 can be named by first saying the hundreds and then, without any connecting word, the two-digit number of tens and units; for example, 365 is trei sute șaizeci și cinci.

Note that the word for "hundred" is sută, and that if the number of hundreds is 2 or larger, the plural sute is required. The noun sută itself is feminine and as such the numbers 100 and 200 are o sută and două sute.

In fast utterances, the numbers 500 and 800 are usually pronounced cinsute and opsute, instead of the standard forms cinci sute and opt sute, respectively. In writing, however, the informal variants are only used for stylistic effects.

=== Large numbers ===
The table below lists the numbers representing powers of 10 larger than 100, that have a corresponding single-word name. The word for 1000 is feminine, all the others are neuter; this is important in the number naming. In Romanian, neuter nouns behave like masculine in the singular and like feminine in the plural.

Number	Singular	Plural
100	o sută	(două) sute
1.000	o mie	(două) mii
1.000.000	un milion	(două) milioane
1.000.000.000	un miliard, un bilion	(două) miliarde, bilioane
1.000.000.000.000	un trilion	(două) trilioane
1.000.000.000.000.000	un cvadrilion (occasionally triliard)	(două) cvadrilioane (occasionally triliarde)
1.000.000.000.000.000.000	un cvintilion	(două) cvintilioane
1.000.000.000.000.000.000.000	un sextilion	(două) sextilioane
...	...	...

To say any cardinal number larger than 1000 the number is split in groups of three digits, from right to left (into units, thousands, millions, etc.), then the groups are read from left to right as in the example below.

12,345,678 (written in Romanian 12.345.678) = douăsprezece milioane trei sute patruzeci și cinci de mii șase sute șaptezeci și opt

When a digit is zero, the corresponding quantity is simply not pronounced:

101,010 (written in Romanian 101.010) = o sută una mii zece

In writing, the groups of three digits are separated by dots. The comma is used as decimal separator. This may be confusing for native English speakers, who use the two symbols the other way around.

=== Decimal fractions ===
Numbers represented as decimal fractions (for example 1.62) are expressed by reading in order the integer part, the decimal separator, and the fractional part. This is the same as in English, with the following exceptions:

- The decimal separator is the comma, in Romanian virgulă. For example, 2.5 is written 2,5 and pronounced doi virgulă cinci.
- The fractional part is read as a multi-digit number, not by saying each digit independently. For example, 3.14 (written 3,14) is pronounced trei virgulă paisprezece (literally three comma fourteen). However, when the number of decimals is too large, they can be read one by one as a string of digits: trei virgulă unu patru unu cinci nouă (3.14159).
- Decimal fractions whose integer part is 0 (such as 0.6) are always written and pronounced in Romanian together with the initial zero: 0,6 is read zero virgulă șase, unlike English point six.

In some situations it is customary to say cu "with" instead of virgulă. For example, medical staff might be heard stating the body temperature in words like treizeci și șapte cu cinci, meaning 37.5 °C.

=== Percents ===
Percentages (%) and permillages (‰) are read using the words la sută and la mie, like in the examples: cinci la sută (5%), nouă la mie (9‰). For percentages an alternative reading uses the neuter noun procent, meaning 1%; the previous example becomes cinci procente.

=== Negative numbers ===
Negative numbers are named just like in English, by placing the word minus, pronounced [ˈminus], at the beginning: −10 m is minus zece metri.

=== Preposition de ===
Syntactically, when a cardinal number determines a noun and when the number has certain values, the preposition de (roughly equivalent to of) is inserted between the number name and the modified noun in a way similar to English hundreds of birds. Example: șaizeci de minute "sixty minutes".

The rules governing the use of preposition de are as follows:

- For numbers from 0 to 19 de is not used. The same applies to numbers whose last two digits make a number in the range from 1 to 19. Examples: șapte case "seven houses", șaisprezece ani "16 years (old)", o sută zece metri "110 meters".
  - An exception to this rule is when the objects that are counted are symbols (letters, numbers). In this case, for better understanding the meaning, de can be used, although the practice is sometimes criticized. Example: se scrie cu doi de i "it's written with two i's", doi de zece "two tens", "two A grades".
  - Another exception is for numbers whose last two digits are 01, in which case an optional de is sometimes used. Examples: o mie una de ori "1001 times", o sută unu de dalmațieni "101 Dalmatians". In the latter case the choice might be influenced by euphony (avoidance of the alliteration).
- For integer numbers from 20 to 100, preposition de is placed between the number name and the modified noun. The same applies to numbers whose last two digits are either 00 or make a number in the range from 20 to 99. Examples: douăzeci de metri "twenty meters", o mie de ori "a thousand times".
  - In technical contexts, to save space, the preposition de may be dropped, especially in writing: 200 metri plat "200 meters sprint". In expressing quantities using measurement unit symbols the preposition de is never written, but usually pronounced: 24 V → douăzeci și patru de volți "24 V, twenty-four volts".
- For non-integer decimal numbers de is never used: 20,5 kg (read douăzeci virgulă cinci kilograme, "20.5 kg").
- For negative numbers all the rules and exceptions above apply unchanged: −20 °C is minus douăzeci de grade Celsius, −5 m is minus cinci metri, −23,4 V is minus douăzeci și trei virgulă patru volți, etc.

The preposition de is also used within the syntax of the number itself, for stating the number of thousands, millions, billions, etc.: douăzeci de mii "twenty thousand" (also note the plural mii, unlike the singular thousand in English). The rules for this de are the same as those described above: it is used when the last two digits of the number of thousands, millions, etc. are 00 or 20–99. Again, in technical contexts, this de may be dropped: treizeci milioane euro "thirty million euros".

=== Agreement between number name and modified noun ===
The number name and the noun it modifies must agree in number and gender.

The rule for number agreement is simple: When the number is 1, the modified noun is put in its singular form, otherwise it takes the plural form, including the case of number 0 and all non-integer numbers.

The gender agreement is somewhat complicated by the fact that the Romanian nouns are classified into three genders: masculine, feminine, and neuter. Specifically, the neuter gender is a combination of the other two: A neuter noun behaves like a masculine noun in the singular, and like a feminine noun in the plural. The gender has implications on the morphology of some of the grammatically connected words, including the number names.

When the units digit of a number is 1 or 2, its name has two distinct forms, masculine and feminine. The only exception is unsprezece "eleven" which has only one form used for both genders.

The gender agreement requires the choice of masculine number names for masculine nouns, and feminine number names for feminine nouns. For the neuter nouns the agreement is obtained by choosing the masculine name of the number not just for number 1, but for all other numbers whose units digit is 1, despite the fact that the noun behaves as feminine; for numbers whose last digit is 2 the feminine numeral is chosen. Examples:

Number	Masculine noun	Neuter noun	Feminine noun
Number	copil "child"	scaun "chair"	oră "hour"
1	un copil	un scaun	o oră
2	doi copii	două scaune	două ore
11	unsprezece copii	unsprezece scaune	unsprezece ore
12	doisprezece copii	douăsprezece scaune	douăsprezece ore
21	douăzeci și unu de copii	douăzeci și unu de scaune^{1}	douăzeci și una de ore
22	douăzeci și doi de copii	douăzeci și două de scaune	douăzeci și două de ore

Note

1. Although, as a neuter noun in the plural, scaune behaves like a feminine noun, the masculine form of the numeral douăzeci și unu is used. This is because unu "one" also represents a number by itself; in the singular, the neuter noun requires a masculine modifier. If the noun is also modified by an adjective, the feminine form of the adjective is used: douăzeci și unu de scaune galbene "21 yellow chairs".

== Distributive numbers ==
Distributive numbers are used to show how a larger quantity is divided into smaller, equal portions. These numbers are named using the cardinal number names and the word câte (or cîte, depending on the spelling convention), roughly meaning "each", but requiring a different word order. The following examples show some distributive numbers in various cases:

- Punem câte patru prăjituri pe fiecare farfurie. "We put four cakes on each plate."
- Copiii merg doi câte doi. "The children are walking two by two."
- Hai să ne despărțim în grupe de câte trei. "Let's split in groups of three each."
- Au fost expuse desenele a câte doi elevi din fiecare clasă. "The drawings of two students in each class were displayed."
- Am dat formularele câte unui copil din fiecare grupă. "I gave the forms to one child in each group." – Am dat formularele la cîte doi copii din fiecare grupă. "I gave the forms to two children in each group."

== Collective numbers ==
Collective numbers are used when all members of a group are referred to by their number, like English all four wheels. Generally, for sets of more than a few elements, the word toți / toate ("all", masculine / feminine) is used together with the cardinal number. The use of the demonstrative cei / cele is optional in the nominative-accusative, but required in the genitive-dative. The genitive-dative form is tuturor celor for both genders. In the following examples note that the modified noun always has the nominative form, and that the definite article goes to the demonstrative where it is used:

- nominative-accusative:
  - masculine: toți șapte piticii, toți cei șapte pitici "all seven dwarfs";
  - feminine: toate trei fiicele, toate cele trei fiice "all three daughters";
- genitive-dative:
  - tuturor celor șapte pitici "of/to all seven dwarfs";
  - tuturor celor trei fiice "of/to all three daughters";
- genitive (another pattern, using the preposition a):
  - numele a toți șapte piticii, numele a toți cei șapte pitici "the names of all seven dwarfs";
  - numele a toate trei fiicele, numele a toate cele trei fiice "the names of all three daughters";
- dative (another pattern, using the preposition la):
  - le-am spus la toți șapte piticii, le-am spus la toți cei șapte pitici "I told all seven dwarfs";
  - le-am spus la toate trei fiicele, le-am spus la toate cele trei fiice "I told all three daughters".

=== Special words ===
When the number is 2 or sometimes 3 or 4, special words are used instead of toți, just as the word both replaces *all two in English. The most frequent of these words are:

- amândoi/amîndoi, amândouă/amîndouă "both", with the genitive-dative form amândurora/amîndurora, which does not follow the usual declension rules;
- ambii, ambele (also "both", but somewhat formal);
- tustrei, tustrele "all three". This and the following collective numerals are used mainly for people and reflects a rather old style.
- câteșitrei/cîteștrei, câteșitrele/cîteștrele "all three";
- tuspatru "all four";
- câteșipatru/cîteșipatru "all four".

== Adverbial numbers ==
The adverbial number is the number used to show the repetition of a certain event, in constructions such as de cinci ori "five times". The table below shows a few examples of adverbial numbers.

Number	Adverbial number	English
1	o dată	once
2	de două ori	twice
3	de trei ori	three times (thrice)
12	de douăsprezece ori	twelve times
21	de douăzeci și una de ori	twenty-one times
22	de douăzeci și două de ori	twenty-two times

For number 1 the usual form is o dată ("once", "one time"). The construction o oară is possible, but rarely used. In the plural, the adverbial numbers are formed using the preposition de, the cardinal number in the feminine, and the noun ori "times", which is the plural of the feminine noun oară.

Sample sentences:

- Am citit cartea de trei ori. "I've read the book three times."
- „Poștașul sună întotdeauna de două ori” "The postman always rings twice"

Approximate numbers can be used, like in the examples below.

- ți-am spus de zeci de ori că nu mă interesează. "I've told you dozens (textually: tens] of times I'm not interested."
- Am ascultat cîntecul acesta de sute de ori. "I've listened to this song hundreds of times."

== Multiplicative numbers ==
For some numbers, special words are used to show multiplication of size, number, etc. The table below gives the most frequent such words, with their English equivalents.

Number	Multiplicative number		Adverbial equivalent	English
Number	traditional	neologism	Adverbial equivalent	English
2	îndoit	dublu	de două ori mai (mult)	double, twice as (much)
3	întreit	triplu	de trei ori mai (mult)	triple, three times as (much)
4	împătrit	cvadruplu	de patru ori mai (mult)	quadruple, four times as (much)
5	încincit	cvintuplu	de cinci ori mai (mult)	quintuple, five times as (much)
10	înzecit	–	de zece ori mai (mult)	ten times as (much)
100	însutit	–	de o sută de ori mai (mult)	a hundred times as (much)
1000	înmiit	–	de o mie de ori mai (mult)	a thousand times as (much)

The traditional multiplicative numbers are formed from the respective cardinal number with the prefix în- (changed into îm- when the following sound is a bilabial plosive), and the suffix -it, the same used to form the past participle of a large category of verbs.

In contemporary Romanian the neologisms are more frequently used.

The multiplicative number can be used as adjective and as adverb. Examples:

- Adjective (note the gender agreement):
  - salariu întreit, salariu triplu ("triple wage", "wage three times as much");
  - putere întreită, putere triplă "three times more power".
- Adverb (no agreement required):
  - Am muncit întreit. Am muncit triplu. "I worked three times harder."
  - Am economisit înzecit față de anul trecut. "I saved ten times as much as last year."

Often instead of the multiplicative numbers an adverbial construction is used. This can be applied for any number larger than 1.

- Am muncit de trei ori mai mult față de anul trecut și am primit un salariu de zece ori mai mare. "I worked three times more than last year and earned a salary ten times bigger."

== Fractional numbers ==
Numbers expressed as parts of a unit (such as "two thirds") are named using the cardinal number, in its masculine form, with the suffix -ime. Other morphological changes take place, as shown below.

Number	Name	Notes
1/2	(o) doime	Also: o jumătate and, by haplology, o jumate, o juma, o jumăta
1/3	(o) treime	
1/4	(o) pătrime	Also: un sfert
1/5	(o) cincime	
1/6	(o) șesime	
1/7	(o) șeptime	
1/8	(o) optime	
1/9	(o) noime	
1/10	(o) zecime	
1/100	(o) sutime	
1/1000	(o) miime	
1/1,000,000	(o) milionime	

A number like 3/5 is expressed as trei cincimi "three fifths". Since all the fractional number names behave like feminine nouns, when the numerator is 1, 2, or any other number with a distinct feminine form, that form must be used: două treimi (2/3). The preposition de is used depending also on the numerator: douăzeci de sutimi (20/100), o sută zece miimi (110/1000).

In music several other such words are frequently used for note lengths:

- șaisprezecime "sixteenth note";
- trezecișidoime "thirty-second note" - often pronounced treijdoime (informal);
- șaizecișipătrime "sixty-fourth note" - often pronounced șaișpătrime (informal).

Fractions involving larger numbers tend to become hard to read. Especially in mathematics it is common to read fractions only using cardinal numbers and the words pe or supra ("on", "over"). For example, două treimi "two thirds" becomes doi pe trei or doi supra trei.

== Ordinal numbers ==
The ordinal number (linguistics) is used to express the position of an object in an ordered sequence, as shown in English by words such as first, second, third, etc. In Romanian, with the exception of number 1, all ordinal numbers are named based on the corresponding cardinal number. Two gender-dependent forms exist for each number. The masculine form (also used with neuter nouns) ends in -lea, whereas the feminine form ends in -a. Starting from 2 they are preceded by the possessive article al / a.

Examples:

- Am terminat de scris al treilea roman. "I finished writing the third novel."
- Locuim la a cincea casă pe dreapta. "We live in the fifth house on the right."

=== Basic forms ===
The basic forms of the ordinal number are given in the table below. All other forms are made using them.

Number	Ordinal number		Meaning
Number	masculine	feminine	Meaning
1	primul (întâiul/întîiul)	prima (întâia/întîia)	"the first"
2	al doilea	a doua	"the second"
3	al treilea	a treia	"the third"
4	al patrulea	a patra	"the fourth"
5	al cincilea	a cincea	"the fifth"
6	al șaselea	a șasea	"the sixth"
7	al șaptelea	a șaptea	"the seventh"
8	al optulea	a opta	"the eighth"
9	al nouălea	a noua	"the ninth"
10	al zecelea	a zecea	"the tenth"
100	al o sutălea	a o suta	"the one hundredth"
1000	al o miilea	a o mia	"the one thousandth"
10^{6}	al un milionulea	a o milioana	"the one millionth"
10^{9}	al un miliardulea	a o miliarda	"the one billionth"
...	...	...	...

=== 11-19 ===
Ordinal numbers in this range can be formed by modifying the corresponding cardinal number: the ending -zece is transformed into -zecelea and -zecea for the masculine and feminine ordinal number. Examples:

- al unsprezecelea, a unsprezecea "the 11th";
- al doisprezecelea, a douăsprezecea "the 12th", note the gender difference doi-, două-;
- al treisprezecelea, a treisprezecea "the 13th", and so on.

=== 20-99 ===
Ordinal numbers in this range that have the unit digit 0 are formed by replacing the ending -zeci of the corresponding cardinal number with -zecilea and -zecea (masculine and feminine):

- al douăzecilea, a douăzecea "the 20th";
- al treizecilea, a treizecea "the 30th", and so on.

When the unit digit is not 0, the cardinal number is used for the tens and the ordinal number for the units. The only exception is when the unit digit is 1; in this case, instead of primul, prima a different word is used: unulea, una. Examples:

- al douăzeci și unulea, a douăzeci și una "the 21st";
- al douăzeci și doilea, a douăzeci și doua "the 22nd";
- al douăzeci și treilea, a douăzeci și treia "the 23rd", and so on.

=== All other numbers ===
The general rule for ordinal number formation is to combine the following elements:

- the possessive article al, a;
- the cardinal number without the last pronounced digit;
- the ordinal number corresponding to the last pronounced digit.

Examples:

- 101st: al o sută unulea, a o sută una;
- 210th: al două sute zecelea, a două sute zecea;
- 700th: al șapte sutelea, a șapte suta;

As seen in the last example above, the ordinal form of the plural of 100, 1000, etc. is needed for this process. These forms are:

Number	Ordinal number	
Number	masculine	feminine
n × 100	sutelea	suta
n × 1000	miilea	mia
n × 10^{6}	milioanelea	milioana
n × 10^{9}	miliardelea	miliarda
...	...	...

Examples with large numbers:

- 1500th: al o mie cinci sutelea, a o mie cinci suta;
- 2000th: al două miilea, a două mia;
- 17,017th: al șaptesprezece mii șaptesprezecilea, a șaptesprezece mii șaptesprezecea
- 20,000th: al douăzeci de miilea, a douăzeci de mia;
- 2,000,000th: al două milioanelea, a două milioana;
- 2,000,000,000th: al două miliardelea, a două miliarda;
- 5,500,000,000th: al cinci miliarde cinci sute de miloanelea, a cinci miliarde cinci sute de miloana
- 8,621,457,098th: al opt miliarde, șase sute douăzeci și unu de milioane, patru sute cincizeci și șapte de mii, nouăzeci și optulea; a opt miliarde, șase sute douăzeci și una de milioane, patru sute cincizeci și șapte de mii, nouăzeci și opta

=== Reverse order ===
In certain situations the word order in expressing the ordinal number is reversed. This occurs when the object is not necessarily perceived as an element in a sequence but rather as an indexed object. For example, instead of al treilea secol the expression secolul al treilea "third century" is used. Note that the noun must have the definite article appended. Other examples:

- etajul al cincilea "fifth floor";
- partea a doua "second part, part two";
- volumul al treilea "third volume, volume three";
- grupa a patra "fourth group".

For simplification, often the cardinal number replaces the ordinal number, although some grammarians criticize this practice: The form secolul douăzeci is seen as an incorrect variant of secolul al douăzecilea "20th century".

For number 1, the form of the ordinal number in this reverse-order construction is întâi (or întîi), in both genders: deceniul întâi "first decade", clasa întâi "first grade". For the feminine, sometimes întâia is used, which until recently used to be considered incorrect by normative works.

The same reverse order is used when naming historical figures:

- Carol I (read Carol Întâi);
- Carol al II-lea (read Carol al Doilea).

As seen above, ordinal numbers are often written using Roman numerals, especially in this reverse order case. The ending specific to the ordinal numbers (-lea, -a) must be preserved and connected to the Roman numeral with a hyphen. Examples:

- secolul al XIX-lea "19th century";
- clasa a V-a "5th grade";
- volumul I, volumul al II-lea "volume I, II".

== Pronunciation ==
In the morphological processes described above, some pronunciation changes occur that are usually marked in writing. This section gives a few details about those pronunciation aspects not "visible" in the written form.

=== Non-syllabic "i" ===
The letter i in the word zeci (both as a separate word and in compounds), although thought by native speakers to indicate an independent sound, is only pronounced as a palatalization of the previous consonant. It does not form a syllable by itself: patruzeci "forty" is pronounced /patruˈzet͡ʃʲ/. The same applies to the last i in cinci: /ˈt͡ʃint͡ʃʲ/, including compounds: 15 is pronounced /ˈt͡ʃint͡ʃʲ.sprezet͡ʃe/ and 50 is /t͡ʃint͡ʃʲˈzet͡ʃʲ/.

However, in the case of ordinal numbers in the masculine form, before -lea the nonsylabic i becomes a full syllabic i in words like douăzecilea "20th" /dowəˈzet͡ʃile̯a/ and in cincilea "5th" /ˈt͡ʃint͡ʃile̯a/.

Semivocalic i can remain a semivowel or switch to a full vowel when followed by -lea: doi /ˈdoj/, al doilea /al ˈdojle̯a/ or /al ˈdo.ile̯a/ ("the second", masculine). It remains a semivowel when followed by -a: a treia /a ˈtreja/ ("the third", feminine).

=== Stress ===
The stress in numbers from 11 to 19 is on the units number, that is, the first element of the compound. Since in all nine cases that element has the stress on its first syllable, the compound itself will also have the stress on the first syllable. The same is valid for the informal short versions:

- unsprezece /ˈunsprezet͡ʃe/, unșpe /ˈunʃpe/ (11);
- șaptesprezece /ˈʃaptesprezet͡ʃe/, șapteșpe /ˈʃapteʃpe/ (17);

Numbers in the series 20, 30, ..., 90 have the normal stress on the element -zeci. However, a stress shift to the first element often occurs, probably because that element carries more information:

- treizeci /trejˈzet͡ʃʲ/ (30);
- „șaizeci? – Nu, șaptezeci!” /ˈʃaptezet͡ʃʲ/ "Sixty? – No, seventy!"

== Etymology ==
With few exceptions, the words involved in the formation of Romanian number names are inherited directly from Latin. This includes the names of all the non-zero digits, all the connecting words (și, spre, de), most of the words and prefixes used to express the non-cardinal types of numbers (toți, ori, al, în- etc.), and part of the multiple names (zece, mie). The remainder are borrowings from Latin and French, such as zero, dublu, triplu, minus, plus, virgulă, milion, miliard, etc., most of which are used internationally.

But the most remarkable exception is the word sută, whose origin is still debated. It is possibly an old slavic borrowing that entered vulgar latin, as the phonetic evolution from slavic sŭto to sută proves hard to explain. A Persian origin has also been suggested.

== Usage ==
Dates. Calendar dates in Romanian are expressed using cardinal numbers, unlike English. For example, "the 21st of April" is 21 aprilie (read douăzeci și unu aprilie). For the first day of a month the ordinal number întâi is often used: 1 Decembrie (read Întâi Decembrie; upper case is used for names of national or international holidays). Normally the masculine form of the number is used everywhere, but when the units digit is 2, the feminine is also frequent: 2 ianuarie can be read both doi ianuarie and două ianuarie; the same applies for days 12 and 22.

Centuries. Centuries are named using ordinal numbers in reverse order: "14th century" is secolul al paisprezecelea (normally written secolul al XIV-lea). Cardinal numbers are often used although considered incorrect: secolul paisprezece. See above for details.

Royal titles. Ordinal numbers (in reverse word order) are used for naming ruling members of a monarchy and the Popes. For example: Carol al II-lea, Papa Benedict al XVI-lea. See above for details.

== Particularities ==
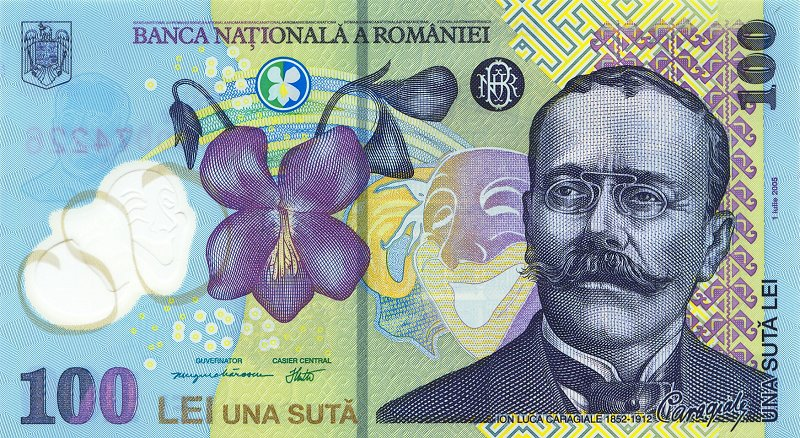
Banknote labeled "una sută lei" (2005 issue).

- In Romanian, a number like 1500 is never read in a way similar to English fifteen hundred, but always o mie cinci sute "one thousand five hundred".
- Sometimes, the numbers 100 and 1000 are spelled out as una sută and una mie, instead of the usual o sută, o mie. This is to ensure that the number of hundreds or thousands is understood correctly, for example when writing out numbers as words, mostly in contexts dealing with money amounts, in forms, telegrams, etc. For example, the 100 lei note is marked with the text "UNA SUTĂ LEI". Such a spelling is very formal and used almost exclusively in writing.
- The title of the book Arabian Nights is translated into Romanian as O mie și una de nopți (textually One thousand and one nights), using the conjunction și although not required by the number naming rules.

== See also ==
- Names of numbers in English
