= Fierarul River =

Fierarul River may refer to:

- Fierarul, a tributary of the Cormoș in Covasna County
- Fierarul, a tributary of the Pârâul Șeii in Covasna County

== See also ==
- Fieru River (disambiguation)
- Fieraru (surname)
- Fierăria River
