= Pătrașcu =

Pătrașcu is a Romanian surname. Notable people with the surname include:

- Bogdan Pătrașcu (born 1979), Romanian footballer
- Cerasela Pătraşcu (born 1992), Romanian artistic gymnast
- Florin Pătrașcu (born 1986), Romanian footballer
- Mihai Pătrașcu (disambiguation), multiple people
- Nicolae Pătrașcu (1580–1627), titular Prince of Wallachia
- Pătrașcu cel Bun (died 1557), ruler of Wallachia
