= Fieru River =

Fieru River may refer to:

- Fieru River (Cojoci)
- Fieru River (Iacobeni)

== See also ==
- Fierarul River (disambiguation)
- Fieraru (surname)
- Fierăria River
