= Doina (disambiguation) =

Doina is a traditional Romanian music genre.

Doina may also refer to:

- Doina (Eminescu), 1883 poem by Mihai Eminescu
- Doina (film), a short film by Nikolas Grasso
- Doina (given name), a Romanian feminine given name
- Doina (moth), a genus of moths
- Doina, Cahul, a commune in Cahul District, Moldova
- Doina, a village in Girov commune, Neamț County, Romania
- Doina, a village in Răuseni commune, Botoșani County, Romania
