= Marcovici =

Marcovici is a Romanian surname. Notable people with the surname include:

- Sébastien Marcovici, French dancer
- Silvia Marcovici (born 1952), Romanian violinist
- Șmil Marcovici, Romanian communist

== See also ==
- Marković
- Markovics
