= Fieraru =

Fieraru and Fierarul are Romanian-language surname of occupational derivation, meaning "blacksmith" ('-ul' corresponds to a definite article). Notable people with the surname include:

- Alfred Fieraru or Alfred Eisenbeisser (1908–1991), Romanian footballer and figure skater
- Gheorghe Fieraru, Romanian Olympic volleyball player (1964 men's team)

== See also ==
- Fierarul River (disambiguation)
- Fieru River (disambiguation)
