= Mihai Viteazu (disambiguation) =

Mihai Viteazu or Michael the Brave (1558–1601) was the Prince of Wallachia (1593–1601), Transylvania (1599–1600), and Moldavia (1600), and is currently a Romanian national hero.

Mihai Viteazu may also refer to:

== Places ==
- Mihai Viteazu, Cluj, a commune in Cluj County
- Mihai Viteazu, Constanța, a commune in Constanța County
- Mihai Viteazu, a village in Ungureni Commune, Botoșani County
- Mihai Viteazu, a village in Vlad Țepeș Commune, Călărași County
- Mihai Viteazu, a village in Saschiz Commune, Mureș County

== Other uses ==
- Ordinul "Mihai Viteazul", the highest Romanian military award in time of war
- Mihai Viteazul (film), a 1970 Romanian film

== See also ==
- Mihai Pătrașcu (disambiguation)
