= Croitoru =

Croitoru, Croitor are Romanian-language surnames derived from the occupation of croitor, meaning "tailor".

- Adrian Croitoru (born 1971), Romanian judoka
- Alexandra Croitoru (born 1975), Romanian photographer
- B. Croitoru (Ştrul Leiba Croitoru) birth name of Ion Călugăru (1902–1956), Romanian writer, journalist and critic
- Constantin Croitoru (born 1952), former Chief of the Romanian Air Force Staff
- Florin Croitoru (born 1993), Romanian weightlifter
- Ion Croitoru (1963–2017), Canadian professional wrestler
- Lucian Croitoru (born 1957), Romanian economist
- Marius Croitoru (born 1980), Romanian professional football manager
- Ştrul Leiba Croitoru, birth name of Ion Călugăru
