= Andreea =

Andreea is a Romanian feminine given name. It is the feminine of Andrei, the Romanian form of Andrew. The name Andreea become popular from the 1970s onwards, being one of the most common given names in the younger generations, ranking third in popularity among feminine names given to children born in 1989, second in 2009, and fourth in 2014.

Notable persons with that name include:

- Andreea Acatrinei (born 1992), Romanian artistic gymnast
- Andreea Arsine (born 1988), Romanian race walker
- Andreea Bălan (born 1984), Romanian singer
- Andreea Bănică (born 1978), Romanian singer
- Andreea Cacovean (born 1978), Romanian artistic gymnast
- Andreea Chițu (born 1988), Romanian judoka
- Andreea A. Creanga, Romanian physician-scientist and epidemiologist
- Andreea Diaconu (born 1991), Romanian fashion model
- Andreea Ehritt-Vanc (born 1973), Romanian tennis player
- Andreea Erciulescu, Romanian statistician
- Andreea Esca (born 1972), Romanian television journalist
- Andreea Grigore (born 1991), Romanian artistic gymnast
- Andreea Isărescu (born 1984), Romanian artistic gymnast
- Andreea Laiu (born 1986), Romanian association football player
- Andreea Marin (born 1974), Romanian television personality
- Andreea Mitu (born 1991), Romanian tennis player
- Andreea Ogrăzeanu (born 1990), Romanian sprinter
- Andreea Preda (born 2006), Romanian artistic gymnast
- Andreea Răducan (born 1983), Romanian artistic gymnast
- Andreea Stefanescu (born 1993), Italian rhythmic gymnast
- Andreea Ulmeanu (born 1984), Romanian artistic gymnast
- Andreea Voicu (born 1996), Romanian association football player

== See also ==
- Andrea
