= Romanian grammar =

Grammar of the Romanian language

Standard Romanian (i.e. the Daco-Romanian language within Eastern Romance) shares largely the same grammar and most of the vocabulary and phonological processes with the other three surviving varieties of Eastern Romance, namely Aromanian, Megleno-Romanian, and Istro-Romanian.

As a Romance language, Romanian shares many characteristics with its more distant relatives: Italian, French, Spanish, Portuguese, Catalan, etc. However, Romanian has preserved certain features of Latin grammar that have been lost elsewhere. This could be explained by a host of factors such as: relative isolation in the Balkans, possible pre-existence of identical grammatical structures in its substratum (as opposed to the substrata over which the other Romance languages developed), and existence of similar elements in the neighboring languages. One Latin element that has survived in Romanian while having disappeared from other Romance languages is the morphological case differentiation in nouns. Nevertheless, declensions have been reduced to only three forms (nominative/accusative, genitive/dative, and vocative) from the original six or seven. Another, that is only seen marginally in other Romance languages such as Italian, is the retention of the neuter gender in nouns.

Romanian is attested from the 16th century. The first Romanian grammar was Elementa linguae daco-romanae sive valachicae by Samuil Micu and Gheorghe Șincai, published in 1780. Many modern writings on Romanian grammar, in particular, most of those published by the Romanian Academy (Academia Română), are prescriptive; the rules regarding plural formation, verb conjugation, word spelling and meanings, etc. are revised periodically to include new tendencies in the language.

== Nouns ==
=== Gender ===
Romanian nouns are categorized into three genders: masculine, feminine, and neuter. The neuter behaves like the masculine in the singular and the feminine in the plural, unlike the neuter in Latin which had distinct forms. Nouns which in their dictionary form (singular, nominative, with no article) end in a consonant or the vowel/semivowel -u are mostly masculine or neuter; if they end in -ă or -a they are usually feminine. In the plural, the ending -i corresponds generally to masculine nouns, whereas feminine and neuter nouns often end in -e. In synchronic terms, Romanian neuter nouns can also be analysed as "ambigeneric", that is as being masculine in the singular and feminine in the plural (see below) and even in diachronic terms certain linguists have argued that this pattern, as well as that of case differentiation, was in a sense "re-invented" rather than a "direct" continuation of the Latin neuter. However, most noun genders correspond to Latin categorization, such as first declension which remained feminine. Similarly third declension nouns retained the gender from Latin, neuter included, most likely reinforced by the Latin plural form -ores which gave the feminine plural -uri in Romanian. Second declension nouns were reanalysed on their semantic characteristic (cervus >cerb "stag" remained masculine but campus >câmp "field" became neuter). As for the fourth declension, the nouns were analysed in regards to their plural endings as the declension collapsed into the second, being reassigned as neutral based on the -ores plural form. The change of gender can thus be explained by syncretism and homophony.

Examples:

- Masculine: om ('man, human being'), bou ('ox'), copac ('tree');
- Neuter: drum ('road'), cadou ('present, gift'), exemplu ('example');
- Feminine: bunică ('grandmother'), carte ('book'), cafea ('coffee').

For nouns designating people the grammatical gender can only be masculine or feminine, and is strictly determined by the biological sex, no matter the phonetics of the noun. For example, nouns like tată (father) and popă (priest) are masculine as they refer to male people, although phonetically they are similar to typical feminine nouns.

For native speakers, the general rule for determining a noun's gender relies on the "one-two" test, which consists in inflecting the noun to both the singular and the plural, together with the numbers one and two. Depending on the gender, the numbers will have different forms for each of the three genders: masculine nouns will be un-doi; feminine nouns, o-două; neuter nouns, un-două.

- Masculine: un om, doi oameni ('one human being', 'two human beings'), un iepure, doi iepuri ('one rabbit', 'two rabbits'). In this case both un and doi are in their masculine forms.
- Feminine: o fată, două fete ('one girl', 'two girls'), o pasăre, două păsări ('one bird', 'two birds'). In this case both o and două are in their feminine forms.
- Neuter: un corp, două corpuri ('one body', 'two bodies'), un sertar, două sertare ('one drawer', 'two drawers'). In this case un is in its masculine form while două is in its feminine form. This is the only case in which the two numbers have different genders.

Romanian numbers generally have a single form regardless of the gender of the determined noun. Exceptions are the numbers un/o ('one') doi/două ('two') and all the numbers made up of two or more digits when the last digit is 1 or 2; these have masculine and feminine forms. In Romanian there is no gender-neutral form for numbers, adjectives or other noun determiners.

=== Number ===
Romanian has two grammatical numbers: singular and plural. Morphologically, the plural form is built by adding specific endings to the singular form. For example, nominative nouns without the definite article form the plural by adding one of the endings -i, -uri, -e, or -le. The plural formation mechanism, often involving other changes in the word structure, is an intrinsic property of each noun and has to be learned together with it.

Examples:

- -i: pom – pomi ('tree'), cal – cai ('horse'), tată – tați ('father'), barcă – bărci ('boat');
- -uri: tren – trenuri ('train'), treabă – treburi ('job, task'), cort – corturi ('tent');
- -e: pai – paie ('straw'), masă – mese ('table, meal'), teatru – teatre ('theater'), muzeu – muzee ('museum');
- -le: stea – stele ('star'), cafea – cafele ('coffee'), pijama – pijamale ('pajama').

=== Case ===
Romanian has inherited three cases from Latin: nominative/accusative, dative/genitive and vocative. Morphologically, the nominative and the accusative are identical in nouns; similarly, the genitive and the dative share the same form (these pairs are distinct in the personal pronouns, however). The vocative is less used as it is normally restricted to nouns designating people or things which are commonly addressed directly. Additionally, nouns in the vocative often borrow the nominative form even when there is a distinct vocative form available.

The genitive-dative form can be derived from the nominative. For feminine nouns the form used in the dative/genitive singular is most often identical to the nominative plural, for example o carte – unei cărți – două cărți (a book – of/to a book – two books).

If the noun is determined by a determiner other than the definite article (an indefinite article, a demonstrative, an indefinite quantifier), then the genitive-dative affixes are applied to this determiner, not to the noun, for example un băiat – unui băiat ('a boy' – 'of/to a boy'). Similarly, if the noun is determined by the definite article (an enclitic in Romanian, see that section), the genitive-dative mark is added at the end of the noun together with the article, for example băiatul – băiatului ('the boy' – 'of/to the boy'), cartea – cărții ('the book' – 'of/to the book'). Masculine proper names designating people form the genitive-dative by placing the article lui before the noun: lui Brâncuși ('of/to Brâncuși'); the same applies to feminine names only when they don't have a typically feminine ending: lui Carmen.

In usual genitival phrases such as numele trandafirului ('the name of the rose'), the genitive is only recognized by the specific ending (-lui in this example) and no other words are necessary. However, in other situations, usually if the noun modified by the genitive attribute is indefinite, the genitival article is required, as for example in câteva opere ale scriitorului ('some of the writer's works').

Romanian dative phrases exhibit clitic doubling similar to that in Spanish, in which the noun in the dative is doubled by a pronoun. The position of this pronoun in the sentence depends on the mood and tense of the verb. For example, in the sentence Le dau un cadou părinților ('I give a present to [my] parents'), the pronoun le doubles the noun părinților without bringing any additional information.

As specified above, the vocative case in Romanian has a special form for most nouns. The tendency in contemporary Romanian is to use the nominative forms, however. The traditional vocative is retained in speech, however, especially in informal speech, or by people living in the countryside. It is seen as a mark of unrefined speech by the majority of city-dwellers, who refrain from its usage. The forms of the vocative are as follows. (Note that the vocative does not have both definite and indefinite forms. The following rules are to be applied for the indefinite form of the nouns):

- Singular feminine nouns and proper names ending in an unstressed -ă/-a take the ending -o e.g. fată → fato ('girl!'). Some popular vocative forms are different, though: Maria → Mărie! ('Mary!').
- Singular feminine nouns ending in an unstressed -e take the ending -eo e.g. punte → punteo! ('bridge!'). Sometimes, the e is dropped altogether.
- Singular feminine nouns ending in a stressed -a take the ending -auo e.g. nuia → nuiauo! ('stick!').
- Singular masculine and neuter nouns ending in a consonant take the ending -ule e.g. băiat → băiatule! ('boy!'). The vocative for animate nouns is sometimes formed as if the noun were a proper name: băiat → băiete! (see below).
- Singular masculine and neuter nouns ending in unstressed -e/-ă take no extra ending (-Ø) e.g. frate → frate! ('brother!').
- Masculine proper names take the ending -e e.g. Ștefan → Ștefane! ('Stephen!'). Some words also experience some change in their vowels (Ion → Ioane! 'John!').
- All plural nouns take the ending -lor e.g. mere → merelor! ('apples!').

Here are some examples of nouns completely inflected:

| | Without a definite article | | | | | |
| | Masculine | | Feminine | | Neuter | |
| | Singular | Plural | Singular | Plural | Singular | Plural |
|---|---|---|---|---|---|---|
| Nominative Accusative | băiat [bəˈjat] | băieți [bəˈjet͡sʲ] | mamă [ˈmamə] | mame [ˈmame] | ou [ow] | ouă [ˈowə] |
| Genitive Dative | băiat [bəˈjat] | băieți [bəˈjet͡sʲ] | mame [ˈmame] | mame [ˈmame] | ou [ow] | ouă [ˈowə] |

| | With a definite article | | | | | |
| | Masculine | | Feminine | | Neuter | |
| | Singular | Plural | Singular | Plural | Singular | Plural |
|---|---|---|---|---|---|---|
| Nominative Accusative | băiatul [bəˈjatul] | băieții [bəˈjet͡sij] | mama [ˈmama] | mamele [ˈmamele] | oul [ˈo.ul] | ouăle [ˈowəle] |
| Genitive Dative | băiatului [bəˈjatuluj] | băieților [bəˈjet͡silor] | mamei [ˈmamej] | mamelor [ˈmamelor] | oului [ˈo.uluj] | ouălor [ˈowəlor] |

| | Masculine | | Feminine | | Neuter | |
| | Singular | Plural | Singular | Plural | Singular | Plural |
|---|---|---|---|---|---|---|
| Vocative | băiatule/băiete [bəˈjatule, bəˈjete] | băieților [bəˈjet͡silor] | mamo [ˈmamo] | mamelor [ˈmamelor] | oule [ˈo.ule] | ouălor [ˈowəlor] |

== Articles ==
=== Definite article ===
An often cited peculiarity of Romanian, which it shares with Aromanian, Megleno-Romanian, and Istro-Romanian, is that, unlike all other Romance languages, the definite articles are usually attached to the end of the noun as enclitics (as in Albanian, Bulgarian, Macedonian and North Germanic languages) instead of being placed in front (See Balkan sprachbund). These enclitic definite articles are believed to have been formed, as in other Romance languages, from Latin demonstrative pronouns. The table below shows the generally accepted etymology of the Romanian definite article.

| | Masculine | | Feminine | |
| | Singular | Plural | Singular | Plural |
|---|---|---|---|---|
| Nominative Accusative | Lat. acc. illum → Rom. -ul → -l, -le, -ul | Lat. nom. illī → Rom. -l'i → -i | Lat. acc. illam → Rom. -euă → -eau → -a | Lat. nom. illae → Rom. -le |
| Genitive Dative | Late Lat. dat. illui, influenced by cui and vulgar illaei → Rom. -lui | Lat. gen. illōrum → Rom. -lor | Lat. dat. illī, influenced by cui → Rom. -ei | Lat. gen. illōrum (gender distinction lost) → Rom. -lor |

Examples:

- Masculine nouns (singular, nominative/accusative):

codru – codrul ('forest' – 'the forest');
pom – pomul ('tree' – 'the tree');
frate – fratele ('brother' – 'the brother');
tată – tatăl ('father' – 'the father').

- Neuter nouns (singular, nominative/accusative):

teatru – teatrul ('theater' – 'the theater');
loc – locul ('place' – 'the place');

- Feminine nouns (singular, nominative/accusative):

casă – casa (house – the house);
floare – floarea (flower – the flower);
cutie – cutia (box – the box);
stea – steaua (star – the star);

=== Indefinite article ===
The Romanian indefinite article, unlike the definite article, is placed before the noun, and has likewise derived from Latin:

| | Masculine | | Feminine | |
| | Singular | Plural | Singular | Plural |
|---|---|---|---|---|
| Nominative Accusative | Lat. acc. ūnum → Rom. un | Lat. nescio quid → Rom. niște | Lat. acc. ūnam → Rom. o | Lat. nescio quid → Rom. niște |
| Genitive Dative | Lat. dat. ūnī, infl. by cui → Rom. unui | Lat. gen. ūnōrum → Rom. unor | Lat. gen./dat. ūnae, infl. by cui → Rom. unei | Lat. gen. ūnōrum (gender distinction lost) → Rom. unor |

(The Latin phrase nescio quid means "I don't know what".)

Nouns in the vocative case cannot be determined by an indefinite article.

Examples of indefinite article usage:

- Masculine:
  - nominative/accusative: singular un copil (a child) – plural niște copii ([some] children);
  - genitive/dative: singular unui copil (of/to a child) – plural unor copii (of/to [some] children);
- Neuter:
  - nominative/accusative: singular un loc (a place) – plural niște locuri ([some] places);
  - genitive/dative: singular unui loc (of/to a place) – plural unor locuri (of/to [some] places);
- Feminine:
  - nominative/accusative: singular o masă (a table) – plural niște mese ([some] tables);
  - genitive/dative: singular unei mese (of/to a table) – plural unor mese (of/to [some] tables);

=== Article appended to adjectives ===
When a noun is determined by an adjective, the normal word order is noun + adjective, and the article (definite or indefinite) is appended to the noun. However, the word order adjective + noun is also possible, mostly used for emphasis on the adjective. Then, the article and the case marker, if any, are applied to the adjective instead:

- Noun + adjective (normal order):

un student bun (a good student);
studentul bun (the good student);
unui student bun (to a good student);
studentului bun (to the good student).

- Adjective + noun (reversed order):

un bun student (a good student);
bunul student (the good student);
unui bun student (to a good student);
bunului student (to the good student).

=== Demonstrative article ===
The demonstrative article is used to put emphasis on the relative superlative of adjectives. The forms are cel and celui (m. sg.), cea and celei (f. sg.), cei and celor (m. pl.) and cele and celor (f. pl.).

=== Genitival article ===
There are situations in Romanian when the noun in the genitive requires the presence of the so-called genitival (or possessive) article (see for example the section "Genitive" in "Romanian nouns"), somewhat similar to the English preposition of, for example in a map of China. In Romanian this becomes o hartă a Chinei, where "a" is the genitival article. The table below shows how the genitival articles depend on gender and number.

| | Masculine | Neuter | Feminine |
| Singular | al | | a |
| Plural | ai | ale | |

The genitival article also has genitive/dative forms, which are used only with a possessive pronoun. They are: alui (m. sg.), alei (f. sg.), and alor (pl., both genders). These forms are rarely used—especially the singular ones—and the sentences are usually rephrased to avoid them.

== Adjectives ==
Romanian adjectives determine the quality of things. They can only fulfill the syntactical functions of attribute and of adjectival complement, which in Romanian is called nume predicativ (nominal predicative).

=== Adjective inflection ===
Adjectives in Romanian inflect for number and gender (and for case in the feminine singular genitive/dative). Most adjectives have distinct forms for all combinations (especially those with the basic form ending in consonants, or -u), some that distinguish gender only in the singular (often ending in -g or -c or in a diphthong), others that do not distinguish gender (usually ending in -e), and a few that distinguish neither gender nor number (often colors, or loanwords).

Adjectives such as amar ("bitter, rude"), curat ("clean") inflect for both gender and number, having four distinct forms:

| | Singular | Plural |
|---|---|---|
| Masculine | amar | amari |
| Neuter | amar | amare |
| Feminine | amară | amare |

Adjectives such as lung ("long"), mic ("small"), nou ("new") inflect for gender in the singular only, showing -i in plural forms:

| | Singular | Plural |
|---|---|---|
| Masculine | lung | lungi |
| Neuter | lung | lungi |
| Feminine | lungă | lungi |

Adjectives such as verde ("green"), mare ("big"), moale ("soft") only inflect for number:

| | Singular | Plural |
|---|---|---|
| Masculine | verde | verzi |
| Neuter | verde | verzi |
| Feminine | verde | verzi |

Borrowed adjectives such as oranj ("orange") is called invariable, having just one inflected form.

Adjective
oranj

Adjectives that have more than one inflected form are called variable.

=== Adjective syntax ===
Syntactical functions of the adjective can be:

- Attribute, in case it defines a noun, pronoun or numeral. (e.g.: The blond boy is here. Băiatul blond este aici.)
- Adjectival complement, in case it defines a copulative verb. (e.g.: The boy is blond. Băiatul este blond.)

=== Degrees of comparison ===
An adjective also can have degrees of comparison.

- Positive Degree (frumos, beautiful)
- Comparative Degree:
  - Of equality (la fel de frumos, as beautiful as)
  - Of inequality (note that the following degrees are written as "comparative of superiority/inferiority", not as "comparative of inequality of superiority/inferiority")
    - Of superiority (mai frumos, more beautiful)
    - Of inferiority (mai puțin frumos, less beautiful)
- Superlative Degree:
  - Relative Superlative
    - Of superiority (cel mai frumos, the most beautiful)
    - Of inferiority (cel mai puțin frumos, the least beautiful)
  - Absolute Superlative (foarte frumos, very beautiful)
    - Of superiority (foarte frumos, translated as "very beautiful")
    - Of inferiority (foarte puțin frumos, roughly translated as "very little beautiful"). This form is not used very much, though, as antonyms can be used (foarte puțin frumos becomes foarte urât, "very little beautiful" becomes "very ugly")

== Pronouns ==
=== Personal pronouns ===
Personal pronouns come in four different cases, depending on their usage in the phrase.

==== Nominative case ====
There are eight personal pronouns (pronume personale) in Romanian:

| | | Singular | Plural |
|---|---|---|---|
| First person | | eu | noi |
| Second person | | tu | voi |
| Third person | Masc. | el | ei |
| Third person | Fem. | ea | ele |

The pronouns above are those in the nominative case. They are usually omitted in Romanian unless it is necessary to disambiguate the meaning of a sentence. Usually, the verb ending provides information about the subject. The feminine forms of plural pronouns are used only for groups of persons or items of exclusively female gender. If the group contains elements of both genders, the masculine form is used. Pronouns in the vocative case in Romanian, which is used for exclamations, or summoning, also take the forms of the nominative case.

==== Accusative case ====
The accusative forms of the pronouns come in two forms: a stressed and an unstressed form:

| | | Singular | | Plural | |
| | | Stressed | Unstressed | Stressed | Unstressed |
|---|---|---|---|---|---|
| First person | | (pe) mine | mă | (pe) noi | ne |
| Second person | | (pe) tine | te | (pe) voi | vă |
| Third person | Masc. | (pe) el | îl | (pe) ei | îi |
| Third person | Fem. | (pe) ea | o | (pe) ele | le |

The stressed form of the pronoun is used (in phrases that are not inverted) after the verb while the unstressed form is employed before the verb. Romanian requires both forms of a pronoun to be present in a sentence if a relative clause is employed, which also reverses the order of the forms (stressed before unstressed). Otherwise, the stressed form is usually left out, the only exception being its usage for adding emphasis to the pronoun.

- Îl văd – I see him/it (a statement of fact)
- Îl văd pe el – I see him (It is him that I see, and no other)
- Fata pe care o văd – The girl whom I see

==== Dative case ====
The dative forms of the pronouns:

| | | Singular | | Plural | |
| | | Stressed | Unstressed | Stressed | Unstressed |
|---|---|---|---|---|---|
| First person | | mie | îmi | nouă | ne |
| Second person | | ție | îți | vouă | vă |
| Third person | Masc. | lui | îi | lor | le |
| Third person | Fem. | ei | îi | lor | le |

==== Genitive case ====
The genitive forms of the pronouns (also called possessive pronouns, pronume posesive):

| | | | | Possessed | | | | | |
| | | | | Singular | | | Plural | | |
| | | | | Masculine | Neuter | Feminine | Masculine | Neuter | Feminine |
|---|---|---|---|---|---|---|---|---|---|
| Possessor | Singular | First person | | al meu | | a mea | ai mei | ale mele | |
| Possessor | Singular | Second person | | al tău | | a ta | ai tăi | ale tale | |
| Possessor | Singular | Third person | Masc. | al lui | | a lui | ai lui | ale lui | |
| Possessor | Singular | Third person | Fem. | al ei | | a ei | ai ei | ale ei | |
| Possessor | Plural | First person | | al nostru | | a noastră | ai noștri | ale noastre | |
| Possessor | Plural | Second person | | al vostru | | a voastră | ai voștri | ale voastre | |
| Possessor | Plural | Third person | | al lor | | a lor | ai lor | ale lor | |

The genitive is retained in the third person. The pronoun, like Latin eius, eorum, inflects according to the possessor, not according to the possessed.

=== Reflexive pronouns ===
These are the forms of the reflexive pronouns (pronume reflexive):

| | Accusative | | Dative | |
| | Singular | Plural | Singular | Plural |
|---|---|---|---|---|
| First person | pe mine / mă | pe noi / ne | mie / îmi | nouă / ne |
| Second person | pe tine / te | pe voi / vă | ție / îți | vouă / vă |
| Third person | pe sine / se | | sieși / își | |

The above reflexive pronouns are in the accusative and dative cases, and in both stressed / unstressed forms. As is made clear, the reflexive pronouns are identical to the personal pronouns, with the exception of the 3rd person, which has entirely new forms. The genitival forms of the reflexive pronouns are the same for the 1st and 2nd persons, but also differ in the 3rd person singular, which is al său. This is a direct continuation of Latin usage; Latin suus was used only when the possessor was the subject of the sentence.

=== Polite pronouns ===
The polite pronouns (pronumele de politețe) are a way of addressing someone formally. They are normally used for interaction with strangers, or by children talking to adults whom they don't know well, or to teachers as a sign of respect. When used in the plural, the second person pronoun is a polite one, for use in formal occasions, or among unacquainted adults, whereas its singular forms are less polite.

The polite pronouns were derived from old Romanian phrases used for addressing the sovereign, such as Domnia Ta, Domnia Voastră, Domnia Lui ("Your Majesty", "Your Majesty (plural)", "His Majesty", literally "Your Reign", etc.). By means of vowel elision, domnia became shortened to dumnea. It should also be noted that mata, mătăluță and similar pronouns were considered polite pronouns in the past, but nowadays only rural communities use them (for example, between neighbours).

The polite pronouns all have the same forms in all cases (the only exception being dumneata, with the genitive/dative form of dumitale), and they exist only in the second and third person, due to their not being used to refer to oneself:

| | | Singular | Plural |
|---|---|---|---|
| Second person | | dumneata, domnia ta | dumneavoastră, domniile voastre |
| Third person | Masc. | dumnealui, domnia lui | dumnealor, domniile lor |
| Third person | Fem. | dumneaei, domnia ei | dumnealor, domniile lor |

A peculiarity of Romanian among Romance languages is the development of an intermediary level of politeness created with the aid of Old Romanian dânsul/dânsa, a variant of the personal pronoun el/ea, formed from the preposition de and the focal particle îns, itself from the Latin pronoun ipse. Together with the singular second person polite pronoun it expresses a minimum of politeness, but higher than personal pronouns:

| | Personal | Intermediary | Polite |
|---|---|---|---|
| Second person singular | tu | dumneata | dumneavoastră |
| Third person singular | el / ea | dânsul / dânsa | dumnealui / dumneaei |
| Third person plural | ei / ele | dânșii / dânsele | dumnealor |

=== Demonstrative pronouns ===
There are many demonstrative pronouns (pronume demonstrative) in Romanian. They are classified as pronume de apropiere, pronume de depărtare, pronume de diferențiere, pronume de identitate, which mean, respectively, pronouns of proximity, pronouns of remoteness, pronouns of differentiation, and pronouns of identity.

==== Pronouns of proximity and remoteness ====
These pronouns describe objects which are either close to the speaker, or farther away from the speaker (formal register/informal register):

| | Pronoun of Proximity | | Pronoun of Remoteness | |
| | Singular | Plural | Singular | Plural |
|---|---|---|---|---|
| Masculine | acesta/ăsta | aceștia/ăștia | acela/ăla | aceia/ăia |
| Neuter | acesta/ăsta | acestea/ăstea | acela/ăla | acelea/alea |
| Feminine | aceasta/asta | acestea/ăstea | aceea/aia | acelea/alea |

==== Pronouns of differentiation and identity ====
These pronouns describe objects either different from an aforementioned object or the same:

| | Pronoun of Differentiation | | Pronoun of Identity | |
| | Singular | Plural | Singular | Plural |
|---|---|---|---|---|
| Masculine | celălalt | ceilalți | același | aceiași |
| Neuter | celălalt | celelalte | același | aceleași |
| Feminine | cealaltă | celelalte | aceeași | aceleași |

=== Intensive pronouns ===
The intensive pronouns and adjectives are used for emphasis.

| | Intensive pronoun | | | | | |
| | Singular | | | Plural | | |
| | Masculine | Neuter | Feminine | Masculine | Neuter | Feminine |
|---|---|---|---|---|---|---|
| First Person | însumi (myself) | | însămi (myself) | înșine (ourselves) | însene (ourselves) | |
| Second Person | însuți (yourself) | | însăți (yourself) | înșivă (yourself) | însevă (yourself) | |
| Third Person | însuși (himself) | | însăși (herself) | înșiși (themselves) | înseși (themselves) | |

=== Relative and interrogative pronouns ===
Pronumele relative și interogative, the two types of pronouns are identical in form but differ in usage. The relative pronouns are used to connect relative clauses to their main clause, but interrogative pronouns are used to form questions. The interrogative pronouns are usually written out with a question mark after them to differentiate them from their relative counterparts.

These are the most common relative/interrogative pronouns:

| Relative Pronoun | cine | (a/al/ai/ale) cui | care | pe care | ce | (a/al/ai/ale) cărui(a)/cărei(a)/căror(a) |
| English translation | who | (whose), to whom | which | which/whom | which/whom | (whose), to whom |

=== Negative and indefinite pronouns ===
Pronumele negative și nehotărâte, these two types of pronouns are used to express negation, as well as indefinite concepts. There are many indefinite pronouns, but only a limited number of negative pronouns.

The most common indefinite pronouns are:

| Indefinite Pronoun | mult | tot | unul/una | altul/alta | atât | puțin/nițel | destul |
| English translation | much | all | one | other | so much/as much | a little | enough |

The most common negative pronouns are:

| Negative Pronoun | nimeni/nimenea | nimic/nimica | niciunul/niciuna | niciunui(a)/niciunei(a) |
| English translation | nobody | nothing | none | to none (of none) |

== Numbers ==
In Romanian grammar, unlike English, the words representing numbers are considered to form a distinct part of speech, called numeral (plural: numerale). Examples:

- Cardinal
  - Proper: doi (two);
  - Multiplicative: îndoit (double);
  - Collective: amândoi (both);
  - Distributive: câte doi (in twos);
  - Fractional: doime (half) (pronounced [do.ime]);
  - Adverbial: de două ori (twice);
- Ordinal: al doilea (the second).

== Verbs ==
As in all Romance languages, Romanian verbs are inflected according to: person, number, tense, mood and voice. The usual word order in sentences is SVO (Subject – Verb – Object). Romanian verbs are traditionally categorized into four large conjugation groups depending on the ending in the infinitive mood. The actual conjugation patterns for each group are multiple.

- First conjugation: verbs ending in –a (long infinitive in –are), such as a da, dare "to give", a cânta, cântare "to sing", including those ending in hiatus ea, such as a crea, creare "to create". Verbs ending orthographically in –chea and –ghea are also included here as their conjugation pattern matches this group, although the long infinitive ends in –ere: a veghea, veghere "to ward".
- Second conjugation: verbs ending in –ea (long infinitive in stressed -ere), only when ea is a diphthong, such as a putea, putere "can", a cădea, cădere "to fall".
- Third conjugation: verbs ending in –e (long infinitive in unstressed –ere), such as a vinde, vindere "to sell", a crede, credere "to believe".
- Fourth conjugation: verbs ending in –i (long infinitive in –ire), such as a veni, venire "to come",.
- Fifth conjugation:verbs ending in -î (long infinitive in -âre), such as a hotărî, hotărâre, "to decide".

Conjugation Table
| | Group 1 - a da | Group 2 - a putea | Group 3 - a crede | Group 4 - a veni | Group 5 - a hotărî |
|---|---|---|---|---|---|
| Eu | dau | pot | cred | vin | hotărăsc |
| Tu | dai | poți | crezi | vii | hotărăști |
| El/Ea | dă | poate | crede | vine | hotărăște |
| Noi | dăm | putem | credem | venim | hotărâm |
| Voi | dați | puteți | credeți | veniți | hotărâți |
| Ei/Ele | dau | pot | cred | vin | hotărăsc |

== Adverbs ==
In Romanian, adverbs usually determine verbs (but, could also modify a clause or an entire sentence) by adding a qualitative description to the action. Romanian adverbs are invariant and identical to the corresponding adjective in its masculine singular form. An exception is the adjective-adverb pair bun-bine ("good" (masculine singular) – "well").

Some examples are:

- Băieții sunt jucători buni. – The boys are good players. (adjective)
- Băieții joacă bine. – The boys play well. (adverb)
- Cântecul acesta este frumos. – This song is beautiful. (adjective)
- Cântăreața cântă frumos. – The singer sings beautifully. (adverb)

== Prepositions ==
The preposition before a noun determines which case the noun must take.

No prepositions take nouns in the nominative case.

=== Prepositions with accusative ===
- pe is used to introduce a direct object when it is represented by a proper name, in which case it does not have a lexical meaning. Pe is also used with the accusative to introduce a circumstantial object of location (English on).
- cu (with) introduces the instrument of the action. It is used to indicate (among others) one's conversation partner, an association with an object, or a means of transport.
- la (at) indicates the location or time of the action or its direction. More specific forms are în (in), spre (towards), pe la (around)
- pentru (for) indicates the scope of an action, or the beneficiary thereof.

=== Prepositions with dative ===
The only prepositions that demand the Dative Case, are: grație (thanks to), datorită (through, with), mulțumită (thanks to), conform (as per), contrar (against), potrivit (according to), aidoma — archaic — (like, similar to), asemenea (such).

=== Prepositions with genitive ===
Other prepositions require the genitive case of nouns. Note that some prepositions of this sort have evolved from phrases with feminine nouns and, as a consequence, require a feminine possessive form when the object is a pronoun; e.g., împotriva mea (against me).

== Interjections ==
In Romanian there are many interjections, and they are commonly used. Those that denote sounds made by animals or objects are called onomatopee, a form similar to the English language onomatopoeia. Below, some interjections and their approximative equivalent in English are shown.

=== Common interjections ===
- Vai! – Oh, my! / Oh, dear!
- Ah! – same as in English
- Oau! – Wow! (often spelled "uau" to mirror english spelling)
- Of! – equivalent to a sigh
- Hmmm... – said when thinking
- Mamă-mamă – said when expressing something cool or extraordinary
- Iată – somewhat like behold!

=== Onomatopoeia ===
- lip-lip – the sound made when slurping liquids (usually by dogs)
- țuști – a sound designating a quick move
- mor-mor – the sound a bear makes
- cucurigu – the sound a rooster makes, cock-a-doodle-doo!
- ham-ham – the sound a dog makes, bark!
- miau – the sound a cat makes, meow!
- cip-cirip – the sound birds make, chirp!
- mu – the sound a cow makes, moo!
- mac-mac – the sound ducks make, quack!

=== Use within sentences ===
Within a sentence, interjections can function as attributes, verbal equivalents, or they can be used as filler, which has no syntactical function at all.

- Attribute: Mi-am luat o fustă mamă-mamă. I bought a cool skirt.
- Verbal Equivalent: Iată-l pe Ion. Look, there is Ion
- Filler: Hmmm... Mă gândesc ce să fac. Hmmm... I am thinking about what to do.

== Common greetings and phrases ==
These include:

- Bună – hello (informal)
- Salut – hello (informal)
- Bună ziua – good day (formal greeting)
- Bună dimineața – good morning
- Bună seara – good evening
- Da – yes
- Nu – no
- Mulțumesc – thank you
- Cu plăcere – you’re welcome
- Pa – bye (informal)
- La revedere – goodbye (formal)
- Pe curând - see you soon

== Phrase syntax ==
Romanian has terminology and rules for phrase syntax, which describes the way simple sentences relate to one another within a single complex sentence. There are many functions a simple sentence may take, their number usually being determined by the number of predicates. It is also noteworthy that Romanian terminology for the terms simple sentence, complex sentence, and phrase is somewhat counterintuitive. The Romanian term propoziție means as much as simple sentence (or clause). To describe a complex sentence (or compound sentence), Romanian uses the word frază, which can cause confusion with the English word phrase, which describes not a complex sentence, but a grouping of words. In consequence, Romanian doesn't have terms for the English noun phrase, or verb phrase, preferring the more commonly understood term predicate for the latter. The former has no formal equivalent in Romanian.

Simple sentences can be of two types: main clauses and subordinate clauses

=== Main clause ===
The main clause, within a complex sentence, does not rely on another sentence to be fully understood. In other words, it has stand-alone meaning. The following example has the verb phrase underlined.

Example:

Am văzut copiii din curtea școlii.
I have seen the children in the school courtyard.

Even though this sentence is long, it is still composed of a single simple sentence, which is a main clause.

=== Subordinate clause ===
A subordinate clause cannot have a stand-alone meaning. It relies on a main clause to give it meaning. It usually determines or defines an element of another clause, be it a main clause, or a subordinate one. The following example has the verb phrase underlined, and the element of relation, which is to say, the relative pronoun used to link the two sentences, in bold. The sentences are also separated and numbered.

Example:

Am văzut copiii ^{1}/ care sunt în curtea școlii. ^{2}/
I have seen the children ^{1}/ who are in the school courtyard. ^{2}/

There are also subordinate clauses other than the relative clause, which is an attributive clause, since it determines a noun, pronoun or numeral, and not a verb phrase. Here is a list of examples illustrating some of the remaining cases:

Direct Object Clause (propoziție subordonată completivă directă):

Înțeleg ^{1}/ ce zice profesoara. ^{2}/
I understand ^{1}/ what the teacher is saying. ^{2}/

Indirect Object Clause (propoziție subordonată completivă indirectă):

Mă gândesc ^{1}/ la ce spune profesoara. ^{2}/
I am thinking ^{1}/ about what the teacher is saying. ^{2}/

Subject Clause (propoziție subordonată subiectivă):

Ceea ce zice profesoara, ^{1}/ e corect. ^{2}/
What the teacher is saying, ^{1}/ is true. ^{2}/

Local Circumstantial Object Clause (propoziție subordonată completivă circumstanțială de loc):

Mă văd cu Ionuț ^{1}/ unde (mi-)a propus el. ^{2}/
I am meeting Johnny ^{1}/ where he proposed (to me). ^{2}/

=== Clauses introduced by coordinating conjunctions ===
Some conjunctions are called coordinating because they do not define the type of clause introduced. Rather, they coordinate an existing clause with another, making the new clause of the same type as the other one. The coordinating conjunctions are of four types (note that the list is not exhaustive):

- The copulative conjunctions are: și (and), nici (neither), and precum și (as well as).
- The adversative conjunctions are: dar/însă/ci (but) and iar (on the other hand).
- The disjunctive conjunctions are: sau/ori/fie (or/either).
- The conclusive conjunctions are: deci/așadar (thus), în concluzie (in conclusion), and prin urmare (therefore).

An example of two main clauses (^{1, 2}) linked together by a coordinative conjunction (bold) is:

Ana este o fată ^{1}/ și Ion este un băiat. ^{2}/
Ana is a girl, ^{1}/ and Ion is a boy. ^{2}/

Two subordinate clauses (^{2, 3}) can also be joined to the same end:

V-am spus despre băiatul ^{1}/ care este la mine în clasă, ^{2}/ și care este foarte bun la matematică. ^{3}/
I have told you about the boy ^{1}/ who is in my class, ^{2}/ and who is very good in mathematics. ^{3}/

The same effect of two main clauses (^{1, 2}) being tied together can also be achieved via juxtaposition of the sentences using a comma:

Am păzit palatul, ^{1}/ palatul era și foarte greu de păzit. ^{2}/
I guarded the palace, ^{1}/ the palace was very hard to guard, too. ^{2}/

== Bibliography ==
- Gabriela Pană Dindelegan, ed. The Grammar of Romanian. Oxford: Oxford University Press, 2013.
- Carmen Dobrovie-Sorin & Ion Giurgea, eds. A Reference Grammar of Romanian, vol. 1: The Noun Phrase. John Benjamins, 2013.
