= Păcuraru =

Păcuraru is a Romanian name, meaning "shepherd", derived from Latin pecurarius, from pecoris, "flock", a derivation of pecus , "sheep". Alternate spelling include Păcurar (especially in Transylvania), Păcurariu and Pekurar (among Romanian speakers in Vojvodina). It is a cognate of the standard Italian word for shepherd "pecoraio".

== People ==
- Johnny Pacar, born John Edward Pacuraru, American actor
- Mircea Păcurariu, Romanian theologian
- Vasile Păcuraru, Romanian football player

== See also ==
- Păcurarul River
