= Popoviciu =

Popoviciu is a Romanian surname, under the influence of Slavic Popovich. Notable people with the surname include:

- Elena Moldovan Popoviciu (1924–2009), Romanian mathematician
- Tiberiu Popoviciu (1906–1975), Romanian mathematician

== See also ==
- Popovici
