= Alexandra Croitoru =

Romanian photographer

Alexandra Croitoru (born 1975) is a Romanian photographer who is seeking to challenge accepted ideas of power sharing and gender in Romania through photography.

== Biography ==
Born in Bucharest, Croitoru studied from 1993 to 1998 in the Graphic Department at the National Academy of Arts. Since 1999, she has taught at the university's Photo-Video Department. In 2012, she participated in the artists' residency program at the 18th Street Arts Center in Los Angeles. In 2014, Croitoru got her PhD degree from National Academy of Arts in Bucharest. Her thesis focused on the "nationalization" of Brâncuși in Romania and was the base for her book published in 2015 in Romanian and translated in English in 2017, Brâncuși. O Viață Veșnică (Brâncuși. An Afterlife).

== Photography ==
Croitoru's work explores Romania's social and gender structures and examines the relationship between fact and fiction in documenting history. She is currently extending her work to cover transnational environments. Her approach began during her studies in the 1990s when she started to challenge power structures and gender as (in her own words) "the Academy was at the time an extremely patriarchal environment."

== Recent exhibitions ==
In addition to many group exhibitions, Croitoru has presented her work at a number of solo exhibitions:

- 2005: Documenting their Dream, Galeria Noua, Bucharest,
- 2006 : Another Black Site (cu Ștefan Tiron), Galeria Plan B, Cluj
- 2007: O lucrare despre muncă și un duel cu moartea, Centrul viitor de artă contemporană, Prague
- 2007: O expoziție de fotografie, Galeria Andreiana Mihail, Bucharest
- 2007: No Photo, Siemens_artLab, Vienna
- 2009: A Fresco for Romania (cu Stefan Tiron), Plan B, Berlin
- 2009: „RE-", Galleri Tom Christoffersen, Copenhagen
- 2012: The Cabbage Process, Galeria Plan B, Cluj
- 2015: The Sons and Daughters of Brancusi. A Family Saga (Act I), Timisoara Art Encounters, Galeria Helios, Timișoara; (Act II), Galeria Plan B, Cluj
- 2019: The Photographic Archive and history with a small h, Salonul de proiecte, Bucharest

== Published books ==
- 2017 Brancusi: An Afterlife, ACBooks, ISBN 978-3943620405
