= Mihai Pătrașcu =

Mihai Pătrașcu may refer to:

- Michael the Brave (or Mihai Viteazu), born Mihai Pătrașcu, prince of Wallachia and Romanian national hero
- Mihai Pătrașcu (computer scientist), Romanian-American computer scientist

== See also ==
- Mihai Viteazu (disambiguation)
