= Vasile Păcuraru =

Romanian footballer

Personal information
- Date of birth: 11 June 1987 (age 39)
- Place of birth: Constanța, Romania
- Height: 1.85 m (6 ft 1 in)
- Position: Right-back

Senior career*
Years	Team	Apps	(Gls)
2005–2010	Farul Constanța	57	(0)
2007	→ Delta Tulcea (loan)	9	(0)
2010–2012	Viitorul Constanța	36	(1)
2014–2015	Farul Tuzla		
Total		102	(1)

International career^{‡}
2007–2008	Romania U21	5	(0)
- * Club domestic league appearances and goals as of 17 July 2018 ‡ National team caps and goals as of 8 January 2008

Vasile "Vasilică" Păcuraru (born 11 June 1987) is a Romanian former professional football player who played as a right-back. He played in his career for Farul Constanța, Delta Tulcea and Viitorul Constanța before retiring in 2012, at only 25 years. After retirement Păcuraru started a new career, as the manager of a poker room, in a gambling salon from Constanța. In 2014 Păcuraru returned in football for a short period of time, signing with the Liga V team, Farul Tuzla.
