= Bechet (crater) =

Crater on Mercury

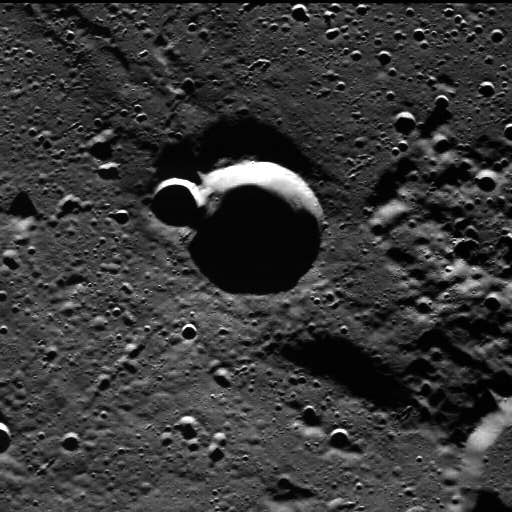
- MESSENGER image of Bechet, with much of its crater floor permanently shadowed from view
- Feature type: Impact crater
- Location: Borealis quadrangle, Mercury
- Coordinates: 83.08°N 93.66°W
- Diameter: 17.6 km
- Eponym: Sidney Bechet

Bechet is a crater on Mercury, located near the north pole. Most of the crater floor is in permanent shadow.

Its name was adopted by the International Astronomical Union in 2013, for the American jazz musician and composer Sidney Bechet.
