= Behçet =

Behçet is a Turkish name and may refer to:

== Given name ==
- Behçet Cantürk, Turkish mob boss
- Behçet Necatigil, Turkish author and poet
- Behçet Uz, Turkish politician and doctor

== Surname ==
- Hulusi Behçet, Turkish dermatologist and scientist

== Other uses ==
- Behçet's disease, Autoimmune disease
