= Romanian verbs =

Romanian verbs are highly inflected in comparison to English verbs, but markedly simple in comparison to Latin, from which Romanian has inherited its verbal conjugation system (through Vulgar Latin). Unlike its nouns, Romanian verbs behave in a similar way to those of other Romance languages such as French, Spanish, and Italian. They conjugate according to mood, tense, voice, person and number. Aspect is not an independent feature in Romanian verbs, although it does manifest itself clearly in the contrast between the imperfect and the compound perfect tenses as well as within the presumptive mood. Also, gender is not distinct except in the past participle tense, in which the verb behaves like an adjective.

== Verb paradigm ==
There are nine moods into which a verb can be put, with five of them being personal (having a different form for each person) and four non-personal. As an example, the tables below show the verb a face ("to do") at all moods, tenses, persons and numbers. Only positive forms in the active voice are given. The corresponding personal pronouns are not included; unlike English verbs, Romanian verbs generally have different forms for each person and number, so pronouns are most often dropped except for emphasis. The English equivalents in the tables (one for each mood and tense) are only an approximative indication of the meaning.

Personal moods
Mood	Tense	Number and person						English equivalent (only sg. 1st)
Mood	Tense	Singular			Plural			English equivalent (only sg. 1st)
Mood	Tense	1st	2nd	3rd	1st	2nd	3rd	English equivalent (only sg. 1st)
Indicative	Present	fac	faci	face	facem	faceți	fac	I do, I am doing
Indicative	Simple perfect (preterite)	făcui	făcuși	făcu	făcurăm	făcurăți	făcură	I have (just) done, I did
Indicative	Imperfect	făceam	făceai	făcea	făceam	făceați	făceau	I was doing, I used to do
Indicative	Pluperfect	făcusem	făcuseși	făcuse	făcuserăm	făcuserăți	făcuseră	I had done
Indicative	Compound perfect	am făcut	ai făcut	a făcut	am făcut	ați făcut	au făcut	I did, I have done
Indicative	Future	voi face	vei face	va face	vom face	veți face	vor face	I will do
Indicative	Future (popular, 1)	am să fac	ai să faci	are să facă	avem să facem	aveți să faceți	au să facă	I'll do
Indicative	Future (popular, 2)	o să fac	o să faci	o să facă	o să facem	o să faceți	o să facă (Note: In contemporary Romanian there is a tendency towards replacing o să with or să for the third person plural.See Gramatica limbii române, vol. I, p. 441.)	I'll do
Indicative	Future-in-the-past (popular)	aveam să fac	aveai să faci	avea să facă	aveam să facem	aveați să faceți	aveau să facă	I was going to do
Indicative	Future perfect	voi fi făcut	vei fi făcut	va fi făcut	vom fi făcut	veți fi făcut	vor fi făcut	I will have done
Subjunctive	Present	să fac	să faci	să facă	să facem	să faceți	să facă	that I do, to do
Subjunctive	Past	să fi făcut						that I did, to have done
Optative- Conditional	Present	aș face	ai face	ar face	am face	ați face	ar face	I would do
Optative- Conditional	Past	aș fi făcut	ai fi făcut	ar fi făcut	am fi făcut	ați fi făcut	ar fi făcut	I would have done
Presumptive	Present	oi face		o face	om face	oți face	or face	I might do
Presumptive	Present progressive	oi fi făcând		o fi făcând	om fi făcând	oți fi făcând	or fi făcând	I might be doing
Presumptive	Past	oi fi făcut		o fi făcut	om fi făcut	oți fi făcut	or fi făcut	I might have done
Imperative	Present	–	fă!	–	–	faceți!	–	do! (2nd person only)

Non-personal moods
Mood	Tense	Verb forms	English equivalent
Infinitive	Present	a face	to do
Infinitive	Past	a fi făcut	to have done
Participle	Past	făcut (sg., masc.) făcută (sg., fem.) făcuți (pl., masc.) făcute (pl., fem.)	done
Gerund	–	făcând	doing
Supine	–	de făcut	(something) to do

=== Usage ===
==== Simple perfect ====
Use of simple perfect in Romania: Area of use Area of partial use Area of infrequent use Not used Historical region of Oltenia highlighted

The simple perfect has been replaced by the compound perfect in most of the Romanian varieties; it is commonly used in the Oltenian vernacular (graiul oltenesc) to denote recent actions that still affect the present situation: mâncai (You have just eaten). In the literary standard, the simple perfect is used almost exclusively in writing, where the author refers to the characters' actions as they take place. For that reason, the second person is practically never used, whereas the first person appears only when the writer includes themself among the characters.

==== Imperfect ====
In Romanian, the compound perfect is often used where other Romance languages would use the imperfect. For example, the English sentence My father was Romanian requires the imperfect when translated into languages like French and Italian, whereas in this context in Romanian the compound perfect form Tatăl meu a fost român is frequently used instead of the imperfect Tatăl meu era român.

==== Past participle ====
Verbs in the past participle are used in their singular masculine form when they are part of compound tenses (compound perfect, future perfect, past subjunctive, etc.) in the active voice. As part of a verb in the passive voice, the past participle behaves like adjectives, and thus must agree in number and gender with the subject:

- Active voice: Am făcut curat în casă. (I cleaned the house.)
- Passive voice: Echipa adversă a fost făcută praf. (The opposing team was laid to waste.)

== Conjugation groups ==
From an etymological point of view, Romanian verbs are categorized into four large conjugation groups depending on the ending in the infinitive mood, and this is the verb classification that is currently taught in schools.

Conjugation	Ending	Examples	Notes
I	–a	a da (to give) a crea (to create) a veghea (to ward)	Verbs ending in hiatus ea are included here, as well as verbs ending in -chea and -ghea, due to their first conjugation-like behavior
II	–ea	a putea (to be able to, can) a cădea (to fall) a vedea (to see)	only when ea is a diphthong (also see above)
III	–e	a vinde (to sell) a crede (to believe) a alege (to choose)	
IV	–i or –î	a ști (to know) a veni (to come) a hotărî (to decide)	

Most verbs fall in the first conjugation group with another large number ending in –i (fourth group).

This classification only partially helps in identifying the correct conjugation pattern. Each group is further split into smaller classes depending on the actual morphological processes that occur. For example, a cânta (to sing) and a lucra (to work) both belong to the first conjugation group, but their indicative first person singular forms are eu cânt (I sing) and eu lucrez (I work), which shows different conjugation mechanisms.

A more appropriate classification, which provides useful information on the actual conjugation pattern, groups all regular verbs into 11 conjugation classes, as shown below.

Class	Identification	Examples (one from each sound change type)
V_{1}	infinitive ending in -a, present indicative without infix	a ajuta, a arăta, a aștepta, a ierta, a toca, a apăra, a îmbrăca, a prezenta, a apăsa, a măsura, a căpăta, a semăna, a pieptăna, a amâna, a intra, a lătra, a apropia, a mângâia, a tăia, a despuia, deochea
V_{2}	infinitive ending in -a, present indicative with infix -ez-	a lucra, a studia, împerechea
V_{3}	infinitive ending in -i, present indicative singular 3rd person ending in -e	a fugi, a despărți, a ieși, a repezi, a dormi, a muri, a veni, a sui, a îndoi, a jupui
V_{4}	infinitive ending in -i, present indicative singular 3rd person ending in -ă	a oferi, a suferi
V_{5}	infinitive ending in -i, present indicative singular 3rd person ending in -ește	a povesti, a trăi
V_{6}	infinitive ending in -î, present indicative singular 3rd person ending in -ă	a vârî, a coborî
V_{7}	infinitive ending in -î, present indicative singular 3rd person ending in -ăște	a hotărî
V_{8}	infinitive ending in diphthong -ea	a apărea, a cădea, a ședea, a vedea, a putea
V_{9}	infinitive ending in -e, past participle ending in -ut	a pierde, a cere, a crede, a bate, a cunoaște, a coase, a vinde, a ține, a umple
V_{10}	infinitive ending in -e, past participle ending in -s	a prinde, a rade, a roade, a plânge, a trage, a merge, a zice, a întoarce, a permite, a scoate, a pune, a rămâne, a purcede, a scrie
V_{11}	infinitive ending in -e, past participle ending in -t or -pt	a rupe, a fierbe, a înfrânge, a sparge, a frige, a coace

Nevertheless, even such a classification does not consider all possible sound alternances. A full classification, considering all combinations of sound changes and ending patterns, contains about seventy types, not including irregular verbs.

=== Irregular verbs ===
There are various kinds of irregularity, such as multiple radicals whose choice is conditioned phonetically or etymologically and exceptional endings. The following is a list of the most frequent irregular verbs:

- a avea "to have"
- a fi "to be"
- a vrea "to want"
- a sta "to sit, stand, or remain"
- a da "to give"
- a azvârli "to throw"
- a lua "to take"
- a bea "to drink"
- a ști "to know"
- a usca "to dry"
- a continua "to continue"
- a mânca "to eat"
- a întârzia "to come late"

== Bibliography ==
- Cojocaru, Dana. (2003). Romanian grammar. SEELRC.
- Pană Dindelegan, Gabriela (2019). Gramatica limbii române pentru gimnaziu. Univers Enciclopedic.
- (in Romanian) Maria Iliescu et al., Vocabularul minimal al limbii române, Editura Didactică și Pedagogică, 1981
- (in Romanian) Valeria Guțu Romalo et al., Gramatica limbii române, Editura Academiei Române, 2005
