= Andreea A. Creanga =

Romanian physician-scientist and epidemiologist

- Creanga in 2020
- Education: Carol Davila University of Medicine and Pharmacy; Johns Hopkins University
- Scientific career
- Fields: Maternal and perinatal health
- Workplaces: Centers for Disease Control and Prevention; Johns Hopkins University; University of Maryland

Andreea A. Creanga is a Romanian physician-scientist and epidemiologist who is an expert in maternal and perinatal health. She is a professor and chair of the department of epidemiology and public health at the University of Maryland School of Medicine.

== Life ==
Creanga earned a M.D. and completed a residency in obstetrics and gynecology at the Carol Davila University of Medicine and Pharmacy. She completed a Ph.D. in population and reproductive health at the Johns Hopkins Bloomberg School of Public Health. She conducted a fellowship at the Centers for Disease Control and Prevention's (CDC) epidemic intelligence service.

Creanga is an expert of maternal and perinatal health. In 2012, she was a researcher at the CDC. By 2020, she was an associate professor and director Maryland Maternal Health Innovation Program at the Johns Hopkins Bloomberg School of Public Health. In 2025, Creanga joined the University of Maryland School of Medicine as the Simon and Bessie Grollman Distinguished Professor chair of the department of epidemiology and public health. She was elected a member of the U.S. National Academy of Medicine in 2026.
