= Ron Bechet =

American visual artist

- Born: July 22, 1956 (age 69); New Orleans, Louisiana, U.S.
- Education: Yale University
- Known for: Painting Drawing

Ron Bechet is a visual artist who works in the traditional mediums of drawing and painting.

== Early life and education ==
Bechet was born in New Orleans, LA and currently lives and works in New Orleans, as well. He completed his BFA at University of New Orleans in Louisiana, and received an MFA from Yale University School of Art in New Haven, Connecticut. Xavier University of Louisiana Department of Art has enlisted him as chairman for over a decade, and, in addition, Bechet has served as Acting Chairman for the Department of Fine Arts & Philosophy at Southern University at New Orleans for many years.

== Career ==
Bechet's work has been exhibited nationally and internationally, culminating in a solo show in the summer of 2015 at the Acadiana Art Center in Lafayette, Louisiana called "Sense of Place" in which he examined the visual culture of the African Diaspora. He has collaborated in pieces and exhibitions with John Scott, with whom he shared studio space for many years. His work has been included in an exhibition curated by Edward Lucie-Smith in London, England in 1996 called "The Louisiana Story-The Next Generation", the imago mundi catalogue for the "Reparation: Contemporary Artists from New Orleans" exhibition, and the P.3 + McKenna Museum of African American Art site exhibition in New Orleans. Most recently, his work was exhibited at the Ogden Museum of Southern Art in New Orleans in the "Tina Freeman: Artist Spaces" show.

The natural world figures heavily in Bechet's practice, and his show "Back to Nature" at the Robert Bruno Gallery New Orleans in 2005 showcased his boundary pushing stylized and colorful landscapes. "Lush, expressive Louisiana landscapes" were depicted on large scale canvases in his show at the Palma Gallery in New Orleans in 2005. Bechet's work can be found in the collections of the New Orleans Museum of Art, The Pennsylvania College of Art and Design Museum, The Tulane School of Law, and the Ogden Museum of Southern Art in New Orleans, LA. His work was featured in an exhibition called Crevasse 22 in conjunction with Prospect.3 in early 2015. He is also involved in community outreach as one of the founding members of the Porch Cultural Arts Organization, and as a co-director of the Home New Orleans Project.
