= Ghiță =

Ghiță is a Romanian diminutive of Gheorghe, and may refer to:

- Ghiță Licu (1945–2014), Romanian handball player
- Ghiță Moscu (1889–1937), Romanian socialist and communist activist
- Ghiță Mureșan (born 1971), Romanian-American basketball player

It is also a surname:

- Daniel Ghiță (born 1981), Romanian kickboxer
- Nicolae Ghiță (born 1967), Romanian wrestler
- Radu Ghiță (born 1990), Romanian handballer
- Sebastian Ghiță (born 1978), Romanian businessman and politician

== See also ==
- Ghita of Alizarr
