= Doina (given name) =

Doina is a Romanian name. People with this name include:

- Doina Bumbea (1950 – 1997), Romanian painter and abductee in North Korea
- Doina Ciobanu (born 1994), fashion influencer and sustainability advocate
- Doina Cornea (1929 – 2018), Romanian human rights activist
- Doina Gherman, Moldovan politician
- Doina Melinte (born 1956), Romanian retired athlete
- Doina Precup, Romanian AI researcher
- Doina Rotaru (born 1951), Romanian composer
- Doina Ruști (born 1957), Romanian novelist and writer
