= Romanian nouns =

Romanian nouns, under the rules of Romanian grammar, are declined, varying by gender, number, and case.

== Gender ==
An intrinsic property of Romanian nouns is their gender, as in all Romance languages, which is a system they inherit from their common ancestor, Latin. Although Classical Latin had three genders, most modern Romance languages have only retained the masculine and feminine; however, this is not the case for Romanian, which has also kept the neuter (otherwise lost in many other Romance varieties).

In Latin, the neuter is a fully-separate gender, such that all determiners have three distinct forms (e.g. the adjective bonus, meaning 'good', has distinct nominative singular forms for all three genders: bonus [masculine] / bona [feminine] / bonum [neuter]). While the Romanian masculine and feminine are similarly distinct, the Romanian neuter is ambigeneric, meaning that it resembles a combination of the other two genders: neuter nouns decline like masculine nouns in the singular and feminine nouns in the plural, and there are no forms which are truly unique to the neuter. As such, all pronouns and noun determiners have a maximum of only two distinct forms for any given combination of case and number, despite there being three distinct gender paradigms, since two of those three paradigms will always be syncretic for any given form. Although the traditional analysis treats ambigeneric nouns as having a gender of their own, it is also possible to analyse Romanian as having only two grammatical genders (masculine and feminine), with the neuter nominals being hybrids that merely switch between the two genders depending on the grammatical number. Other terms for the class of neuter nouns include 'heterogenous', 'ambigenous', 'of both kinds', or 'mixed nouns'.

Depending on gender, otherwise similar nouns will inflect differently. For example, the nouns "câine" (dog, compare Latin canis) and "pâine" (bread, compare Latin panis) have phonetically identical endings in the main form (nominative singular), but the former is a masculine noun, while the latter is feminine. For this reason, when inflected they behave in very different manners:

- definite article: "câinele" (the dog) - "pâinea" (the bread);
- plural, with definite article: "câinii" (the dogs) - "pâinile" (the loaves of bread);
- genitive/dative: "câinelui" (of/to the dog) - "pâinii" (of/to the bread).

Also, the gender of a noun determines the morphology of most determiners, such as articles, adjectives, demonstratives, numerals. The two nouns taken as examples above will give:

- indefinite article: "un câine" (a dog) - "o pâine" (a loaf of bread);
- adjective: "câine alb" (white dog) - "pâine albă" (white bread);
- determinative demonstrative: "acest câine" (this dog) - "această pâine" (this bread);
- determinative possessive pronoun: "câinele meu" (my dog) - "pâinea mea" (my bread);
- cardinal numeral: "doi câini" (two dogs) - "două pâini" (two loaves of bread), etc.

While in many cases assigning the correct gender may be facilitated by the noun ending or meaning, the distinction is usually difficult for those learning Romanian as a second language. For natives, the one-two test is practically infallible: Saying "un câine - doi câini" makes it clear, by the form of the determining numerals, that "câine" is masculine. When the numerals take the forms "o ... - două ..." the noun in question is feminine, and finally the forms "un ... - două ..." are indicative of a neuter noun.

=== Gender assignment: phonetic ===
The following phonetic rules can be used, to some degree, to infer the grammatical gender for nouns when these are in their nominative singular form, and without any determiner that could help in recognizing the gender.

- Nouns ending in a consonant or in vowel or semivowel u are almost always masculine or neuter:
  - masculine: "om" (man, human being), "copil" (child), "bou" (ox, bull);
  - neuter: "ac" (needle), "drum" (road), "ou" (egg), "lucru" (thing, job);
  - feminine proper nouns of foreign origin or diminutives: "Carmen", "Corinuș" (diminutive from "Corina"), "Catrinel", "Lulu."
- Nouns ending in ă are feminine with very few exceptions:
  - feminine: "fată" (girl), "piatră" (stone), "haină" (coat);
  - masculine: "tată" (father), "popă" (priest);
- Nouns ending in stressed a (including those ending in stressed ea or ia) are feminine:
  - "sofa" (sofa), "cafea" (coffee), "nuia" (wicker).
- Nouns ending in e are generally feminine, but many masculine and a few neuter exceptions exist:
  - feminine: "carte" (book), "femeie" (woman), "mare" (sea), "cheie" (key);
  - masculine: "frate" (brother), "iepure" (hare, rabbit), "perete" (wall);
  - neuter: "nume" (name).
- Nouns ending in i are mostly masculine or neuter, with some feminine exceptions:
  - masculine: "ochi" (eye), "pui" (chicken), "unchi" (uncle);
  - neuter: "unghi" (angle), "ceai" (tea), "cui" (nail), "nai" (Pan's pipe);
  - feminine: "zi" (day), "tanti" (aunt).

These rules can be further refined when the noun is recognized as being derived from other words by use of specific endings, as follows:

- Masculine nouns:
  - -ist: "chimist" (chemist), "jurnalist" (journalist);
  - -an, -ian: "american" (American), "fizician" (physicist);
  - -or, -tor: "profesor" (teacher, professor), "muncitor" (worker);
  - -ez: "englez" (Englishman), "chinez" (Chinese);
  - -ar: "demnitar" (statesman), "fierar" (blacksmith);
  - others: "geamgiu" (glazier), "paznic" (guard), "frizer" (hairdresser), "român" (Romanian), etc.
- Neuter nouns:
  - -ism: "capitalism" (capitalism), "arhaism" (archaism);
  - -ment, -mânt: "amuzament" (amusement), "abonament" (subscription), "învățământ" (education) - but "ferment" (ferment) is masculine;
  - -ut, -it, -at, derived from the past participle of verbs: "început" (beginning), "trecut" (past), "sfârșit" (end), "morărit" (milling), "uscat" (land), "oftat" (sigh);
  - -aj: "sondaj" (poll), "garaj" (garage), "afișaj" (display).
- Feminine nouns:
  - -oare, -toare: "onoare" (honor), "înotătoare" (swimmer) - but "soare" (sun) is masculine;
  - -are, -ere, -ire, -âre, derived from the long infinitive of verbs: "salvare" (ambulance), "plăcere" (pleasure), "amintire" (recollection), "hotărâre" (decision);
  - -siune/tiune, abstract nouns: "emisiune" (broadcast, TV show), "versiune" (version), "dimensiune" (dimension), "chestiune" (question);
  - -tate, abstract nouns: "libertate" (liberty, freedom), "greutate" (difficulty), "calitate" (quality), "rapiditate" (quickness);
  - -tudine, abstract nouns: "longitudine" (longitude),"latitudine" (latitude);
  - others: "bucurie" (joy), etc.

=== Gender assignment: semantic ===
Rules other than phonetic can be used when the meaning of the noun is known or at least its semantic group is recognized. In this category obvious examples are proper names of people, or nouns designating nationality, profession, etc. Nouns referring to animals and birds are always specific to their biological gender, and often occur in pairs the same way as we have cow and bull in English. Less obvious situations are described below.

- Masculine nouns:
  - most tree names: "brad" (fir), "stejar" (oak), "mesteacăn" (birch), but some are feminine: "salcie" (willow), "magnolie" (magnolia);
  - mountains and mountain chains, often in the plural: "Carpați" (Carpathians), "Bucegi," "Retezat," "Făgăraș". (Because mountains are naturally referred to as, e.g., "the Carpathian mountains", and "mountain" is masculine, its gender "bleeds" to the proper noun, as if it were an adjective; it is possible to construct feminine versions of these names, though they are not used. This often happens for other notable reliefs.)
  - others: months of the year, letters of the alphabet, musical notes, figures, etc.
- Feminine nouns:
  - names of countries and continents when they end in a: "Franța" (France), "Japonia" (Japan), "America" (America), otherwise they are neuter: "Mexic" (Mexico), "Vietnam" (Vietnam);
  - the seasons of the year: "vară" (summer), "iarnă" (winter);
  - the days of the week: "luni" (Monday), "duminică" (Sunday). (The word for day is feminine, "zi".)

== Number ==
Like all Indo-European languages, Romanian differentiates morphologically the singular and the plural number of nouns. Within the Romance languages, regarding the plural formation, Romanian falls in the group East from the La Spezia–Rimini Line together with Italian. As such, the plural is formed by the addition or change of the final vowel of the singular noun, very often accompanied by other vocalic and/or consonantic shifts in the noun stem, consonant deletion, and/or the interposition of other phonemes. Occasionally, the plural noun has the same form as the singular. A few nouns are defective by missing either the singular or the plural. Finally, some nouns can form the plural in several ways, depending on the meaning. To illustrate, here are just a few examples:

- simple vocalic addition: "elev" - "elevi" (school student);
- simple vocalic replacement: "mamă" - "mame" (mother);
- vocalic shift in the stem: "măr" - "mere" (apple);
- consonantic shift in the stem: "perete" - "pereți" (wall);
- consonant deletion in the stem: "cal" - "cai" (horse);
- interposition of other phonemes: "cap" - "capete" (head);
- unchanged plural: "unchi" - "unchi" (uncle);
- singular only: "rouă" (dew);
- plural only: "grâne" (grain/crops)
- multiple plural forms: "cap" - "capete" / "capi" / "capuri" (head / leader / cape);

Most Romanian plural nouns, in their nominative non-articulated forms, end in "i" with another large category ending in "e". Only some recent borrowings make up the very few exceptions to this rule, which seems to be a very stable feature of the language. Among the old Romanian nouns the only exception is "ou" /ˈow/ (egg), which makes the plural "ouă" /ˈowə/.

Morphologically, the plural is built by using one of the following four endings: -i, -uri, -e, and -(e)le. Of these, the last one used to have few representatives, such as "stea" - "stele" (star) and "nuia" - "nuiele" (wicker). Subsequent borrowings enlarged this group, in particular a series of nouns from Turkish ending in stressed "a" which were assigned to the feminine gender (although Turkish nouns do not have gender).

=== Plural formation ===
Like the gender, the plural formation is an intrinsic property of the noun, and is acquired by native speakers one by one together with the respective noun. The tables below show the plural formation modes for nouns according to their gender, in the non-articulated nominative/accusative case. The asterisk (*) indicates irregular plural formation, requiring the insertion of consonants belonging neither to the stem nor to the plural ending, the deletion of stem consonants, or some unusual vocalic shifts.

Plural of masculine nouns
| Singular | Plural | Examples |
|---|---|---|
| -cons. | -cons.+i | pom - pomi (tree) doctor - doctori (doctor) copil -* copii (children) om -* oameni (man, human being) |
| -u | -i | codru - codri (forest) leu - lei (lion) |
| -e | -i | frate - frați (brother) pește - pești (fish) |
| -i | -i | ochi - ochi (eye) unchi - unchi (uncle) |
| -ă | -i | tată - tați (father) popă - popi (priest) |

Plural of feminine nouns
| Singular | Plural | Examples |
|---|---|---|
| -ă | -e | casă - case (house) fată - fete (girl) |
| -ă | -i | lună - luni (moon, month) barcă - bărci (boat) soră -* surori (sister) mână -* mâini (hand) |
| -ă | -uri | marfă - mărfuri (merchandise) dulceață - dulcețuri (jam) |
| -e | -i | carte - cărți (book) vale -* văi (valley) |
| -vowel+ie | -vowel+i | baie - băi (bathroom) gutuie - gutui (quince) |
| -cons.+ie | -cons.+ii | frecție - frecții (massage) farfurie - farfurii (plate) felie - felii (slice) |
| -a | -ale | basma - basmale (handkerchief) pijama - pijamale (pajamas) |
| -ea | -ele | cafea - cafele (coffee) saltea - saltele (mattress) |
| -i | | miercuri - miercuri (Wednesday) tanti - tanti (aunt) |

Plural of neuter nouns
| Singular | Plural | Examples |
|---|---|---|
| -cons. | -cons.+uri | vin - vinuri (wine) loc - locuri (place) |
| -cons. | -cons.+e | picior - picioare (foot, leg) oraș - orașe (city) cap -* capete (head) |
| -u | -uri | lucru - lucruri (thing) pariu - pariuri (bet) |
| -u | -e | muzeu - muzee (museum) teatru - teatre (theater) |
| -u | -ă | ou - ouă (egg) |
| -iu /ju/ | -ii /ij/ | exercițiu - exerciții (exercise) fotoliu - fotolii (armchair) |
| -iu /iw/ | -ie /i.e/ | sicriu - sicrie (coffin) burghiu - burghie (drill) |
| -i /j/ | -ie /je/ | tramvai - tramvaie (tram) pai - paie (straw) |
| -i /i/ | -iuri | taxi - taxiuri (taxi) |
| -e | | nume - nume (name) prenume - prenume (first name) |

=== Pronunciation of plural endings ===
In writing, all masculine nouns and part of the feminine and neuter nouns end in letter "i" in the plural. However, this letter can correspond phonetically to either vowel /i/, semivowel /j/, or non-syllabic /ʲ/ (see Romanian phonology). The exact pronunciation depends on the preceding phonemes:

- after a vowel, it is pronounced as semivowel /j/, as in
  - "lei" /ˈlej/ (lions),
  - "văi" /ˈvəj/ (valleys),
  - "exerciții" /eɡzerˈt͡ʃit͡sij/ (exercises);
- after a consonant or consonant group, it is pronounced as non-syllabic /ʲ/, as in
  - "frați" /ˈfrat͡sʲ/ (brothers),
  - "bărci" /ˈbərt͡ʃʲ/ (boats),
  - "locuri" /ˈlokurʲ/ (places);
- after a consonant group, in nouns that require an additional syllable, it is pronounced as vowel /i/. The need of an additional syllable is phonetic, and is indicated in the masculine singular by the presence of vowel /u/. Examples:
  - "codru" /ˈkodru/ - "codri" /ˈkodri/ (forest),
  - "zimbru" /ˈzimbru/ - "zimbri" /ˈzimbri/ (wisent),
  - but "tanti" /ˈtanti/ (both pl. and sg., aunt).

The plural ending "e" is always a vowel and does not represent a pronunciation problem.

Despite many plural endings changing the number of syllables in the nouns, the word stress does not generally shift. The only exceptions are a few irregular nouns such as: "soră" /ˈsorə/ - "surori" /suˈrorʲ/ (sister) and, "noră" /ˈnorə/ - "nurori" /nuˈrorʲ/ (daughter-in-law).

== Case ==
Syntactically, Romanian nouns can be in any of five grammatical cases:

- nominative, when the noun is the subject;
- accusative, when the noun is the direct object, often also required by prepositions;
- genitive, when the noun shows the possessor;
- dative, when the noun shows the receiver of an action;
- vocative, when the noun shows the (usually animate) addressee of what is said.

The short definitions above are only an approximate indication of the actual usage. Here are some examples with the noun "băiat" (boy) in the various cases:

| Case | Example |
|---|---|
| Nominative | Băiatul vecinilor mi-a adus scrisoarea. (The neighbors' boy brought me the letter.) |
| Accusative | Am dus băiatul până în fața casei lui. (I led the boy up to in front of his house.) |
| Genitive | Ochii băiatului erau plini de lacrimi. (The boy's eyes were full of tears.) |
| Dative | I-am spus băiatului să se liniștească. (I told the boy to calm down.) |
| Vocative | — Băiete, așteaptă până se întorc părinții tăi. (Boy, wait until your parents come back.) |

Indefinite article (a, an, some)

| | Singular | | | Plural |
| | Masculine | Neuter | Feminine | Plural |
|---|---|---|---|---|
| Nominative; Accusative | un | | o | niște |
| Genitive; Dative | unui | | unei | unor |

Morphologically, the five cases are expressed by giving the nouns three different forms. The nominative and the accusative share the same form, the distinction being made from the context, word order, or by the use of particular prepositions. Similarly, the genitive and the dative share the same form, distinguished syntactically or by the presence of possession articles when the nouns are in the genitive case. The vocative is less used than the other four, because it is limited to people, animals, or other things that can be addressed.

Comparatively, other Romance languages, although maintaining a syntactic distinction between cases, have reduced them to a single form and replaced morphological variation with the use of specific prepositions. Latin used to have up to seven cases, the Romanian five plus the ablative and the locative.

The case mark is always applied to the article, definite or indefinite, that determines the noun, and sometimes also to the noun itself. The indefinite article, like its English counterpart, is placed before the noun as a separate word, and has in Romanian different forms for the nominative/accusative and for the genitive/dative (the vocative cannot be determined by an indefinite article). On the other hand, the Romanian definite article is always appended as an ending (see enclitic). As the plural mark and the case mark are attached also at the end of the word, the declension becomes a complex process of combining all three endings: The definite article has special forms for the various cases and numbers, and is placed after the plural mark with possible phonetic changes to make the word easily pronounceable.

The table below gives the complete paradigm of the masculine noun "bou" (ox).

| | Singular | | Plural | |
| | Indefinite article | Definite article | Indefinite article | Definite article |
|---|---|---|---|---|
| Nominative; Accusative | un bou /un ˈbow/ (an ox) | boul /ˈbo.ul/ (the ox) | niște boi /niʃ.te ˈboj/ (some oxen) | boii /ˈbo.ij/ (the oxen) |
| Genitive; Dative | unui bou /unuj ˈbow/ (of/to an ox) | boului /ˈbo.uluj/ (of/to the ox) | unor boi /unor ˈboj/ (of/to some oxen) | boilor /ˈbo.ilor/ (of/to the oxen) |
| Vocative | — | boule /ˈbo.ule/ (you, ox) | — | boilor /ˈbo.ilor/ (you, oxen) |

=== Declension with the indefinite article ===
The general rule for the declension of nouns when they are accompanied by the indefinite article is that the article changes form and the noun keeps its main (nominative) form at all cases. The only exception is the singular of feminine nouns in the genitive/dative forms: they use their respective plural nominative forms in addition to inflecting the indefinite article. The tables below give a few examples. Three nouns from each gender were chosen as representatives:

masculine "pom" (tree), "frate" (brother), "tată" (father);
neuter "loc" (place), "scaun" (chair), "exercițiu" (exercise);
feminine "casă" (house), "floare" (flower), "cafea" (coffee).

| | Singular | | |
| | Masculine | Neuter | Feminine |
|---|---|---|---|
| Nominative; Accusative | un pom un frate un tată | un loc un scaun un exercițiu | o casă o floare o cafea |
| Genitive; Dative | unui pom unui frate unui tată | unui loc unui scaun unui exercițiu | unei case unei flori unei cafele |

| | Plural | | |
| | Masculine | Neuter | Feminine |
|---|---|---|---|
| Nominative; Accusative | niște pomi niște frați niște tați | niște locuri niște scaune niște exerciții | niște case niște flori niște cafele |
| Genitive; Dative | unor pomi unor frați unor tați | unor locuri unor scaune unor exerciții | unor case unor flori unor cafele |

=== Declension with the definite article ===
In the singular, in the nominative/accusative case, the definite article is -(u)l or -le for masculine and neuter nouns and (u)a for feminine nouns. When these forms are changed for the genitive/dative case, the definite article becomes -lui for masculine and neuter nouns and -i for feminine. To obtain these forms, the definite article for masculine and neuter simply affix the ending -ui after consonant l (after removing vowel e where it exists). In the case of feminine nouns, the genitive/dative is derived not from the singular but from the plural non-articulated forms, by adding a semivocalic -i at the end.

In the plural, in the nominative/accusative case, the definite article is -ii /iǐ/ for masculine nouns, and -le for neuter and feminine nouns. To put these forms into genitive/dative the masculine definite article is changed into -ilor, and the neuter and feminine definite article is changed into -lor.

Nouns with definite article can also be in the vocative case. In the singular, nouns are either left in their nominative/accusative forms, or given the endings specific to gender: -le for masculine and neuter nouns, and -o for feminine nouns.

The tables below show examples using the same nouns as previously.

| | Singular | | |
| | Masculine | Neuter | Feminine |
|---|---|---|---|
| Nominative; Accusative | pomul fratele tatăl | locul scaunul exercițiul | casa floarea cafeaua |
| Genitive; Dative | pomului fratelui tatălui | locului scaunului exercițiului | casei florii cafelei |
| Vocative | [pomule] frate tată | [locule] [scaunule] [exercițiule] | [casă] [floareo] [cafeao] |

| | Plural | | |
| | Masculine | Neuter | Feminine |
|---|---|---|---|
| Nominative; Accusative | pomii frații tații | locurile scaunele exercițiile | casele florile cafelele |
| Genitive; Dative | pomilor fraților taților | locurilor scaunelor exercițiilor | caselor florilor cafelelor |
| Vocative | pomilor fraților taților | [locurilor] [scaunelor] [exercițiilor] | [caselor] [florilor] [cafelelor] |

For the vocative, the square brackets are used where the respective forms can be imagined, but are not normally used. Additionally, some nouns can have two versions of vocative which can express slightly different attitudes toward the person (animal, thing, etc.) that is being addressed. For example, "iubit" (lover) has two vocative forms: "iubite" and "iubitule". The first sounds more direct and might be found in poems and song lyrics (Oh, my darling!), while the second sounds more natural in everyday life (Honey!) (Compare "my dear" in English which normally expresses close intimacy but is reduced to a mere formality when followed by the person's name: 'My dear Mr Smith').

The genitive/dative forms require a special mention in the case of proper nouns representing people's names. For men's names, the inflection is replaced by placing the article lui before the noun, as a separate word.

- Am citit poeziile lui Eminescu de nenumărate ori. (I've read Eminescu's poems countless times.)
- I-am dat lui Mihai prăjitura ta. (I gave your cake to Mihai.)

The same construction is sometimes applied to women's names, but the practice is considered by prescriptive grammar as incorrect, with the exception of feminine proper nouns that have a masculine-like ending:

- fusta Mariei / *fusta lui Maria (Mary's skirt)
- fusta lui Carmen / *fusta Carmenei (Carmen's skirt)

For proper nouns other than those referring to people, the genitive is constructed by inflection, like the common nouns.

=== Case usage ===
The following subsections describe the usage of each case.

==== Nominative ====
Nominative is the case of the subject and of the predicate nominal. Here are some examples:

- Subject:
  - Apa trece, pietrele rămân. (Water passes, rocks remain .)
  - Poștașul sună întotdeauna de două ori. (The postman always rings twice.)
  - Mă doare capul. (I have a headache. - lit. The head hurts me.)
  - Îmi plac merele. (I like apples - lit. Apples please me.)
- Predicate nominal:
  - Fotografia este o artă. (Photography is an art.)
  - Ochii sunt oglinda sufletului. (The eyes are the soul's mirror.)
  - Roma a devenit un imperiu. (Rome became an empire.)

==== Genitive ====
Genitive usually indicates possession or belonging, but is also used to show origin and others kinds of relationship. Additionally, while most prepositions require the noun they determine to take the accusative, there are some exceptions in which the genitive (or the dative) is required.

The genitive is most often used in the pattern noun for possessed + noun for possessor, with the noun denoting the possessor in the genitive case, like for example "balonul copilului" means child's balloon (lit. the balloon of the child). In such a construction, if the possessed ("balonul", the balloon) has the definite article attached to it—the most usual situation—and the possessor ("copilului", of the child) comes immediately after, no other words are necessary to express the genitival relationship.

- Ochii bunicului sunt albaștri. (Grandfather's eyes are blue.)
- Fiul vecinilor intră mereu în bucluc. (The neighbors' son always gets into trouble.)

In any other construction involving the genitive, a possessive article must be used, corresponding roughly to the English "of the". This can happen (1) when the possessed has the indefinite article, (2) when other words intervene between the two parts, or (3) when the possessed and possessor switch order in the sentence. The possessive article must agree in number and gender with the possessed, and has the forms below.

| | Masculine | Neuter | Feminine |
| Singular | al | | a |
| Plural | ai | ale | |

- Indefinite article:
  - Era un mare iubitor al artelor. (He was a great art lover. - lit. lover of the arts)
  - Au participat și reprezentanți ai guvernului. (Government representatives also took part. - lit. representatives of the government)
- Intervening words:
  - Diametrul aparent al Lunii este egal cu cel al Soarelui. (The Moon's apparent diameter is equal to the Sun's.)
  - Așa scrie în lecția 10 a manualului. (This is what lesson 10 in the textbook says. - lit. lesson 10 of the textbook)
- Reversal of possessed and possessor, especially in poetry:
  - Al vieții vis de aur ca un fulger, ca o clipă-i. (Eminescu: Life's golden dream is like a flash, like a blink.)

===== Prepositions requiring the genitive =====
Some prepositions and preposition compounds require the noun they determine to be in the genitive case. Examples:

- asupra (regarding): o discuție asupra fluxului de lucru (a discussion regarding the workflow, - lit. regarding the flow of the work);
- împotriva (against): voturi împotriva creșterii impozitului (votes against tax increase, - lit. against the increase of the tax);
- deasupra (above), înapoia (behind), înaintea (before), înăuntrul (inside);
- în fața (in front of), în timpul (during), în jurul (around);
- la începutul (at the beginning of), la mijlocul (in the middle of), la sfârșitul (at the end of);
- din cauza (because of), cu ocazia (on the occasion of), în numele (on behalf of).

Nouns in the genitive can occur in series, as in "culoarea jucăriei copilului prietenului meu" (my friend's child's toy's color), but as in English more than three successive nouns become difficult to understand and are considered bad use of the language.

==== Dative ====
The dative is used for the indirect object, that is, the noun representing the person/object that receives the action indicated by the verb. The dative is required by a particular series of verbs, many of which express the general idea of giving, hence the name. Examples:

- a da (to give): I-am dat câinelui sandvișul meu. (I gave my sandwich to the dog.);
- a spune (to tell): Le spui colegilor să nu vină mâine? (Will you tell your workmates not to come tomorrow?);
- a cere (to ask for), a explica (to explain), a oferi (to offer), a arăta (to show), etc.;
- Not related to the idea of giving: a folosi (to be useful to), a dăuna (to harm).

===== Clitic doubling =====
As in the examples above, the dative noun in such constructions is almost always doubled by a personal pronoun, itself in the dative case, which is placed near the verb no matter where the noun is in the sentence. Although not including this logically redundant pronoun does not affect the meaning and still produces grammatically correct sentences, native speakers seldom fail to include it. Depending on the verb mood, tense, and initial phoneme, the doubling personal pronoun will change in several regards: (1) which form, full or clitic, of the pronoun is used, (2) the position relative to the verb or verb parts, and (3) whether it is a true clitic attached phonetically to the verb or it is a separate word.

The table below shows these patterns on two verb examples—one starting with a consonant and the other with a vowel—, "a da" (to give) and "a arăta" (to show). For personal moods only the first person in the singular is shown, as the other forms behave identically. In each table cell, the upper example is for the singular of the personal pronoun, and the lower one for the plural. In all situations the pronoun has the same form for all genders and only changes with number.

| Mood | Tense | a da (to give) | a arăta (to show) |
|---|---|---|---|
Personal moods:
| Indicative | Present | îi dau le dau | îi arăt, i-arăt le arăt, le-arăt |
| Indicative | Compound perfect | i-am dat le-am dat | i-am arătat le-am arătat |
| Indicative | Pluperfect | îi dădusem le dădusem | îi arătasem, i-arătasem le arătasem, le-arătasem |
| Indicative | Imperfect | îi dădeam le dădeam | îi arătam, i-arătam le arătam, le-arătam |
| Indicative | Simple perfect | îi dădui le dădui | îi arătai, i-arătai le arătai, le-arătai |
| Indicative | Future in the past | aveam să-i dau aveam să le dau | aveam să-i arăt, aveam să i-arăt aveam să le arăt, aveam să le-arăt |
| Indicative | Future | îi voi da le voi da | îi voi arăta le voi arăta |
| Indicative | Popular future I | o să-i dau o să le dau | o să-i arăt, o să i-arăt o să le arăt, o să le-arăt |
| Indicative | Popular future II | am să-i dau am să le dau | am să-i arăt, am să i-arăt am să le arăt, am să le-arăt |
| Indicative | Future perfect | îi voi fi dat le voi fi dat | îi voi fi arătat le voi fi arătat |
| Indicative | Popular future perfect I | o să-i fi dat o să le fi dat | o să-i fi arătat o să le fi arătat |
| Indicative | Popular future perfect II | am să-i fi dat am să le fi dat | am să-i fi arătat am să le fi arătat |
| Subjunctive | Present | să-i dau să le dau | să-i arăt, să i-arăt să le arăt, să le-arăt |
| Subjunctive | Past | să-i fi dat să le fi dat | să-i fi arătat să le fi arătat |
| Conditional; Optative | Present | i-aș da le-aș da | i-aș arăta le-aș arăta |
| Conditional; Optative | Past | i-aș fi dat le-aș fi dat | i-aș fi arătat le-aș fi arătat |
| Presumptive | Present | i-oi da le-oi da | i-oi arăta le-oi arăta |
| Presumptive | Present progressive | i-oi fi dând le-oi fi dând | i-oi fi arătând le-oi fi arătând |
| Presumptive | Past | i-oi fi dat le-oi fi dat | i-oi fi arătat le-oi fi arătat |
| Imperative | | dă-i — nu îi da, nu-i da dă-le — nu le da | arată-i — nu îi arăta, nu-i arăta arată-le — nu le arăta, nu le-arăta |
Non-personal moods:
| Infinitive | Present | a-i da a le da | a-i arăta a le arăta, a le-arăta |
| Infinitive | Past | a-i fi dat a le fi dat | a-i fi arătat a le fi arătat |
| Gerund | | dându-i dându-le | arătându-i arătându-le |
| Participle | Past | dat dat | arătat arătat |
| Supine | | de dat de dat | de arătat de arătat |

As the examples show, when the verb is simple (not compound), the doubling pronoun is placed before the verb and has its full form. Exception to this rule make the imperative and the gerund, which require the clitic form bound at the end of the verb. Also, the past participle and the supine do not require the clitic doubling at all. When the verb is compound and includes the conjunction "să" (approximately equivalent to English to) or the infinitive preposition "a", the doubling pronoun is placed immediately after "să" / "a" and takes the clitic form in the singular ("să-i" and "a-i") and the full form in the plural ("să le" and "a le"). In all remaining situations the pronoun is placed before the first element of the compound verb and takes the clitic form, as in "i-am dat" and "le-am dat".

When the verb starts with a vowel and the doubling pronoun comes right before it the use of the full or clitic is optional. In such cases the shorter (clitic) version one is more frequent in speech and informal writing.

The gerund deserves a special mention, as not only is the doubling pronoun placed after the verb, but the verb itself receives an epenthetic "u". This "u" can be alikened to the vowels that take this position in the Latin gerund, and has become the Italian "o" as in "sto facendo" (I am doing).

When the full doubling pronoun "îi" is placed before the verb (all parts of the verb, if compound), it can turn into its clitic form if it binds through elision to the word before it, as in "nu-i dau" (I don't give him), "că-i dau" (that I give him), "și-i dau" (and I give him).

The imperative mood builds its affirmative and negative forms on different patterns, so that the position of the doubling pronoun is different. Compare "dă-i" → "nu-i da", "dă-le" → "nu le da".

In poetry, archaic or regional speech, or invectives, the order of the compound verb elements can switch, and with them the position of the doubling pronoun will change. Compare: "i-am dat" → "datu-i-am", "le-am dat" → "datu-le-am", "le-aș da" → "da-le-aș". Note also the use of the epenthetic "u" again where otherwise a consonant would come just before the pronoun.

Things are further complicated if another pronoun is present which claims a position near the verb, such as the pronoun that replaces or doubles the direct object. Here are some examples of how such situations are handled.

Depending on the gender of the direct object, the pronoun position can be different in certain cases:

| I l-am dat câinelui. | → | i | l- | am dat | câinelui. |
| | | dat. masc. sg. | acc. masc. sg. | | dat. masc. sg. |
| I gave it to the dog. | | to him (the dog) | it | I gave | to the dog. |

| I-am dat-o câinelui. | → | i- | am dat | -o | câinelui. |
| | | dat. masc. sg. | | acc. fem. sg. | dat. masc. sg. |
| I gave it to the dog. | | to him (the dog) | I gave | it | to the dog. |

If two pronouns having identical forms meet, the pronoun doubling the indirect object drops, as it is optional:

| Oasele i le dau câinelui. | → | oasele | i | le | dau | câinelui. |
| | | acc. neut. pl. | dat. masc. sg. | acc. fem. pl. | | dat. masc. sg. |
| I give the bones to the dog. | | the bones | to him (the dog) | them (the bones) | I give | to the dog. |

| Oasele le dau câinilor. | → | oasele | Ø | le | dau | câinilor. |
| | | acc. neut. pl. | dat. masc. pl. | acc. fem. pl. | | dat. masc. pl. |
| I give the bones to the dogs. | | the bones | to them (the dogs) | them (the bones) | I give | to the dogs. |

===== Words requiring the dative =====
Although most prepositions require the noun they determine to be in the accusative case, a few must be followed by a noun in the dative. Similarly, the dative is required by some adjectives, many of which conveying the general idea of being (or not) beneficial, or having derived from verbs that themselves require the dative. A few adverbs showing comparison fall into the same category. Examples:

- Prepositions:
  - datorită (owing to): Am reușit datorită ajutorului tău. (I succeeded owing to your help.);
  - mulțumită, grație (thanks to).
- Adjectives:
  - favorabil (favorable): Am primit numai mesaje favorabile proiectului noastru. (We received only messages in favor of our project.);
  - folositor, util (useful), propice (propitious), recunoscător (grateful), dăunător (harmful).
- Adverbs:
  - asemenea (like): De atâta fericire fața ei strălucea asemenea soarelui. (With so much happiness her face was shining like the sun.);
  - similar (similarly), conform (according to), contrar (contrary to).

Depending on the sentence syntax, the adverbs above can also work as adjectives, nevertheless requiring the dative.

==== Accusative ====
The accusative is mainly the case of the direct object, but other nouns can take the accusative form: those indirect objects which aren't in the dative case, as well as most circumstantials and attributes built with prepositions. Examples:

- Direct object:

Am spart o farfurie. (I broke a plate.)
Cunoști un profesor de chitară? (Do you know a guitar instructor?)

- Indirect object:

Fiul meu vorbește tot timpul despre avioane. (My son always talks about airplanes.)
Mă gândesc adesea la copilăria mea. (I often think about my childhood.)

- Circumstantial:

Am ajuns în sfârșit la gară. (We finally arrived at the station.)
Ne ducem la mare cu trenul. (We're going to the sea by train.)

- Attribute:

Am găsit numărul ei în cartea de telefon. (I found her number in the phonebook.)
Oamenii de la munte sunt duri. (Mountain people are tough.)

A particularity of Romanian is that the direct object is marked in certain situations by the preposition pe, which in such constructions loses its original meaning (on, above). The usage rules for this marker are complex and insufficiently codified; both semantics and morphology comes into play. Examples of direct object with marker "pe" are given below.

- When the noun designates a person or a personified animal/object:

L-am văzut ieri pe Mihai. (I saw Mihai [person's name: Michael] yesterday.)
L-a împușcat pe lup în cap. (He shot the wolf in the head.)

- When the noun designates an inanimate object, if the subject and the direct object are the same noun and they precede the verb:

Cui pe cui se scoate. (Proverb: A nail takes out a nail.)

- When the noun is preceded by the comparative adverb ca (like):

M-a privit ca pe un străin. (He looked at me as if I were a stranger.)

The same preposition pe is used not only with nouns in accusative, but also with other words having the role of the direct object: pronouns (personal, interrogative, relative, demonstrative, indefinite or negative), numerals acting as pronouns, etc.

==== Vocative ====
As the vocative case gives the noun a distinct charge of familiarity, directness, and immediateness, nouns in the vocative are rarely used alone, except when addressing or calling someone. Most of the time, and particularly in writing, such nouns are used together with specific adjectives such as drag (dear) and stimat (respected, dear). Also, such adjective+noun constructions often include a possessive pronoun. Examples:

- Vocative alone:
  - Băiete! (You, boy! or Waiter!)
  - Măi, Ioane, unde ești? (Hey, Ion, where are you?) - măi is one of a series of interjections used to address someone
  - Bleguților! (You, little silly buggers!)
  - Eleno! (Elena, dear!)
  - Doamnelor! (Ladies!)
- Vocative with adjective:
  - Dragă bunico, (Dear Grandma)
  - Stimate domnule director, (used to formally address in writing the manager of an institution)
- Vocative with possessive pronoun and adjective:
  - Dragul meu Radu, (My dear Radu)
  - Scumpii noștri prieteni, (Our beloved friends)
