= Ghimbav (river) =

- Location within Romania

Location
- Country: Romania
- Counties: Argeș County

Physical characteristics
- Source: Leaota Mountains
- Mouth: Dâmbovița
  - location: Upstream of Rucăr
  - coordinates: 45.3880°N 25.1984°E
- Length: 12 km (7.5 mi)
- Basin size: 42 km^{2} (16 sq mi)

Basin features
- Progression: Dâmbovița→ Argeș→ Danube→ Black Sea

The Ghimbav is a left tributary of the river Dâmbovița in Romania. Its source is in the Leaota Mountains. It flows into the Dâmbovița upstream from Rucăr. Its length is 12 km (7.5 mi) and its basin size is 42 km^{2} (16 sq mi).

== Tributaries ==
The following rivers are tributaries to the river Ghimbav (from source to mouth):

- Left: Cumpărata Mare, Valea Popii, Bragadiru, Fierăria, Pârâul cu Pietriș, Plaiul, Pita
- Right: Cumpărata Mică, Secăruia, Valea Andoliei, Pârâul Stânei, Pârâul Verde, Pârâul Rău, Bechet
