= Latvian name =

Latvian names, like in most European cultures, consist of two main elements: the given name (vārds) followed by family name (uzvārds). During the Soviet occupation (1940–1941; 1944–1991) the practice of giving a middle name (otrais vārds) was discouraged, but since the restoration of independence, Latvian legislation again allows the giving of up to two given names and it has become more common to give a middle name to children.

Latvian male names end in 1st or 2nd declension masculine endings, either -s/-š or -is (with a handful of mostly foreign exceptions ending in indeclinable -o, such as Ivo, Raivo, Gvido, Bruno, Oto and only a few belonging to the 3rd declension ending in -us, such as Ingus, Mikus, Edžus, Zemgus). Latvian female names have the feminine 4th or 5th declension endings -a or -e respectively.

For centuries, one of the most popular Latvian names has been Jānis, whose written use dates back to 1290. The vocative case is used when addressing someone directly, for example, Jāni for Jānis. The diminutive form is often used to express endearment or when addressing children, for example, addressing Jānis as Jānīt (vocative diminutive).

== Spelling ==
Writing of Latvian names always conform to the highly phonetic Latvian orthography and highly fusional Latvian grammar, and, in the case of foreign-born Latvian nationals or marriages between Latvian women and foreigners (whence they assume the family name of their husband), the foreign names are modified to conform to the phonetic spelling and to acquire the respective case ending. For example, Gerard Depardieu is Žerārs Depardjē, Joaquin Phoenix is Hoakins Fīnikss and Donald Trump is Donalds Tramps.

This has given rise to at least half a dozen lawsuits over the last couple decades, mostly ethnic Russian Latvian nationals not content with addition of case endings. Other examples include:

- a Latvian woman contesting her foreign husband's name being transcribed phonetically in her documents (Mentzen alias Mencena v. Latvia case) where the plaintiffs were turned down
- legal proceedings by a Latvian couple to allow them to register their child as Otto (instead of Oto)
- a claim filed with UN HRC by a Latvian national of Russian-Jewish Leonid Raihman whose claims were upheld.

== History ==
Before the Christianization of Latvia in 13th century Latvians commonly gave their children names of objects from natural surroundings, such as Irbe (partridge), Lācis (bear), Ieva (bird cherry) and Ābele (apple tree), many of whom later became last names. Names of the following 13th and 14th-century fief-owning Baltic vassals have been recorded – Manegints, Radiķis, Tontegode, Tots, Aulis, Mažeiki brothers, Grimeķis, Sirkants, Gaiža, Duvkants, Dumpjāts, Treinis, Gribonis, Mēlvaldis, Kantebute, Stegebute, Taites, Angutis, Poja, Krūms, Pitkejānis, Tautenis, Sentots, Cielava, Karīds etc. After the Christianized Latvians began giving their children Christian first names, such as Marija, Anna, and Pēteris. Lutheran priest Christoph Harder also coined a number of new names from Latvian words for different virtues like Dievmīlis (God-lover), Strādulis (hard-worker), Žēlīte (sorrowful one), and Skaidrīte (clear one).

Before the emancipation from serfdom (1817 in Courland, 1819 in Vidzeme, 1861 in Latgale) only noblemen, free craftsmen or people living in towns had surnames. Therefore, the oldest Latvian surnames usually originate from German or Low German, reflecting the dominance of German as an official language in Latvia till the 19th century. Examples: Meijers/Meijere (German: Meier, farm administrator; akin to Mayor), Millers/Millere (German: Müller, miller), Šmits/Šmite (German: Schmidt, smith), Šulcs/Šulca (German: Schulze, constable), Ulmanis (German: Ullmann, a person from Ulm), Godmanis (a God-man), Pētersons (son of Peter). Some Latvian surnames, mainly from Latgale are of Polish or Belarusian origin by changing the final -ski/-cki to -skis/-ckis, -czyk to -čiks or -vich/-wicz to -vičs, such as Sokolovskis/Sokolovska, Baldunčiks/Baldunčika or Ratkevičs/Ratkeviča. However, some surnames of Latvian origin (like Mucenieks, Kalns and Putns) have also been recorded as early as the 16th and 17th century, for example, among the transport workers.

The official records of Latvian names were often variously forcibly assimilated into the foreign culture dominant at times in Latvian lands. For example, local pastors, who were often of German descent, used to issue marriage and birth certificates with Germanized names: e.g., Kalns was written as Berg (both meaning "mountain" in Latvian and German respectively). Sometimes "de-Germanization" produced a slightly different name, e.g., Daugmants was Germanized as Daugmann and then de-Germanized into Daugmanis. Demographer Ilmārs Mežs has estimated that nowadays around a third of all the Latvian surnames are of German origin.

In rural regions it historically was common to identify individual by the name of the farmstead they lived in, rather than by a surname. Using surnames became mandatory after serfdom was abolished. Head of the family, usually the oldest living male, was required to choose the surname for his entire family. To document the newly adopted surnames in 1826 a special soul revision was conducted in the governorate of Livonia (in Vidzeme), in Courland the surnames were documented in 8th soul revision in 1835, while in Latgale serfdom was fully abolished only in 1866. Diminutives were the most common form of family names, such as Kalniņš/Kalniņa (small hill) and Bērziņš/Bērziņa (small birch).

During the times when Latvia was part of the Russian Empire and Soviet Union, in official usage Latvian names were commonly Russified. In particular, it followed the three-part pattern of Russian names: given name, patronymic, family name. Also, the masculine endings of first names were often truncated. For example, poet Imants Ziedonis was officially called Imant Yanovich Ziedonis (Имант Янович Зиедонис)

In the 20th century, in particular, in the interbellum period of the Latvian national movement and during the Ulmanis authoritarian regime in the late 1930s, when Baltic Germans left Latvia, there was a tendency to Latvianize their Germanic names. In one such example Minister of Interior Kornēlijs Veitmanis became Kornēlijs Veidnieks.

In the 21st century, the Latvian practice of transcribing foreign personal names into Latvian orthography and adding gender-specific endings has been criticized by some families with foreign spouses because the Latvianized spelling of a surname may differ from the original spelling used by the foreign spouse in their identity documents, which reportedly have resulted in difficulties with banking, border crossings, and proving family relationships, particularly when dealing with authorities outside Latvia.

== Name day ==
Latvia is among the European countries that celebrate name days (vārda dienas), a celebration almost comparable in importance to that of a birthday. Most of them are related to the Saints' days in the Church calendar, but in recent decades new names have been added to the calendar by a special commission. Some names and their name days bear a connection with important holidays, for example, arguably one of the most important holidays, summer solstice, referred to as Jāņi starts on June 23 with Līgo diena (name day for females named Līga) and continues through June 24 or Jāņi – name day for males named Jānis. Similarly Mārtiņi on November 10 coincides with the name day for males named Mārtiņš, Mārcis and Markuss.

== Most common Latvian names ==
Below are the most common ethnic Latvian names in 2006. However taking into account the large Eastern Slavic diaspora (Russians, Ukrainians, Belarusians) that make up around one third of Latvia's population, names popular among the Slavic population make it high on this list, for example, the most popular male name in Russia Aleksandr (or Aleksandrs in its Latvian rendition) makes it as the second most common name in Latvia if all ethnicities are counted.

| No. | Male names | Female names | Family names |
|---|---|---|---|
| 1 | Jānis | Anna | Bērziņš |
| 2 | Andris | Kristīne | Kalniņš |
| 3 | Juris | Inese | Ozoliņš |
| 4 | Edgars | Inga | Jansons |
| 5 | Māris | Ilze | Ozols |
| 6 | Aivars | Līga | Liepiņš |
| 7 | Mārtiņš | Dace | Krūmiņš |
| 8 | Pēteris | Anita | Balodis |
| 9 | Ivars | Marija | Eglītis |
| 10 | Valdis | Iveta | Pētersons |
