= Eglītis =

Origin
- Origin: Latvian
- Meaning: "little spruce"

Eglītis (Old orthography: Eg(g)li(h)t; feminine: Eglīte) is a Latvian surname, derived from the Latvian word for "spruce" (egle). Individuals with the surname include:

- Anšlavs Eglītis (1906–1993), Latvian writer, journalist and painter
- Baiba Eglīte (born 1989), Latvian basketball player
- Hilda Vīka-Eglīte (1897–1963), Latvian artist and writer
- Jānis Eglītis (1961–2013), politician
- Viktors Eglītis (1877–1945), writer and art theorist
- Zane Eglīte (born 1984), basketball player
