= Ozols =

Family name

Origin
- Origin: Latvian
- Meaning: "oak"

Ozols (masculine; old orthography: O(h)sol), feminine: Ozola is a Latvian surname, derived from the Latvian word for "oak". Notable persons with the surname include:

- Andris Ozols (born 1968), Latvian businessman
- Astra Goldmane (née Ozola, born 1956), Latvian chess player
- Auseklis Ozols (1941–2025), American painter
- Dainis Ozols (born 1966), Latvian cyclist
- Dana Reizniece-Ozola, Latvian politician and chess player
- Gena Ozols, American politician
- Guna Ozola, Latvian footballer
- Karlis Ozols (1912–2001), Australian chess player
- Kārlis Ozols-Priednieks (1896–1938), Latvian poet
- Otto Ozols (pen name of Mārtiņš Barkovskis; born 1970), Latvian writer and social activist
- Roberts Ozols (cyclist) (1905–2002), Latvian cyclist
- Roberts Ozols (footballer)
- Saskia Ozols (born 1978), American artist
- Voldemārs Ozols (1884–1949), Latvian politician

== See also ==
- Ozoliņš
- Ozolin
- Ozolas
