= Stefan Krivtsov =

Russian historian and activist (1885–1943)

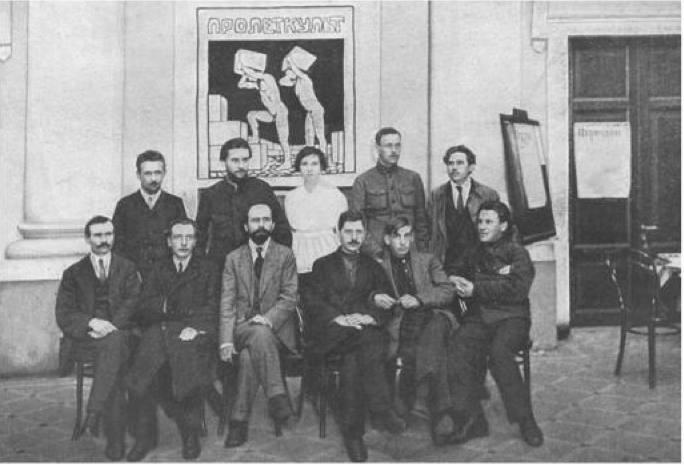
Praesidium of the national Proletkult organisation elected at the first national conference, September 1918. Sitting from left to right: Fedor Kalinin, Vladimir Faidysh, Pavel Lebedev-Polianskii, Aleksei Samobytnik-Mashirov I. I. Nikitin, Vasili Ignatov Standing from left to right: Stefan Krivtsov, Karl Ozol-Prednek, Anna Dodonova, N. M. Vasilevskii, Vladimir Kirillov

Stefan Savvich Krivtsov (Russian: Степан Саввич Кривцов; 1885–1943) was a Russian Soviet professor of history and cultural activist who played a major part in the ideological development of the Proletkult.

He graduated from the Faculty of History, Physics and Mathematics, Moscow State University.

He saw the role of Proletkult as being involved in life-building: "The Proletkult is striving to create a new proletarian culture, not just new songs, new music, new theatre, but rather a whole new mode of life. we must create an entirely new world from top to bottom". He wrote for Proletarskaya Kul'tura, often critically when the reality of the movement did not live up to his vision.

"In place of a club in Yaroslavl they have a cookhouse. The same goes for the club in Petrovsk. They named it after comrade Lenin and it should have the clearest and loftiest goals, such as the unification of the workers and the wakening of their interest in and love for art. Instead they have some sort of free love unions."

In 1928, following the death of Alexander Bogdanov, Krivtsov wrote an account of his memories of one of the founding figures of Proletkult for the Under the Banner of Marxism.

He died in 1943 and is buried in the Donskoy Cemetery, Moscow.
