= Lācis =

Family name

Origin
- Origin: Latvian
- Meaning: "bear"

Other names
- Variant form: Latsis

Lācis (Old orthography: Lahz(i)(s); feminine: Lāce) is a Latvian surname, derived from the Latvian word for "bear". Individuals with the surname include:

- Asja Lācis (1891–1979), Latvian actress
- Dzintars Lācis (1940–1992), Latvian cyclist
- Kārlis Lācis (born 1977), Latvian composer
- Vilis Lācis (1904-1966), Latvian author and Premier of Latvian SSR

== See also ==
- Latsis, same surname, transliterated from Russian
