= Ozoliņa =

Family name

Origin
- Origin: Latvian
- Meaning: "little oak"

Ozoliņa (Old orthography: O(h)solin(g); masculine: Ozoliņš) is a Latvian surname, derived from the Latvian word for "oak" (ozols). Individuals with the surname include:

- Agnese Ozoliņa (born 1979), Latvian swimmer
- Elvīra Ozoliņa (born 1939), Soviet javelin thrower
- Sinta Ozoliņa-Kovala (born 1988), Latvian javelin thrower

== See also ==
- Ozolin
