= Kharino =

Kharino (Russian: Харино) is the name of several rural localities in Russia:

- Kharino, Beryozovsky District, Perm Krai, a village in Beryozovsky District, Perm Krai
- Kharino, Gaynsky District, Perm Krai, a settlement in Gaynsky District, Perm Krai
