= Anna Dodonova =

Bolshevik activist and intellectual

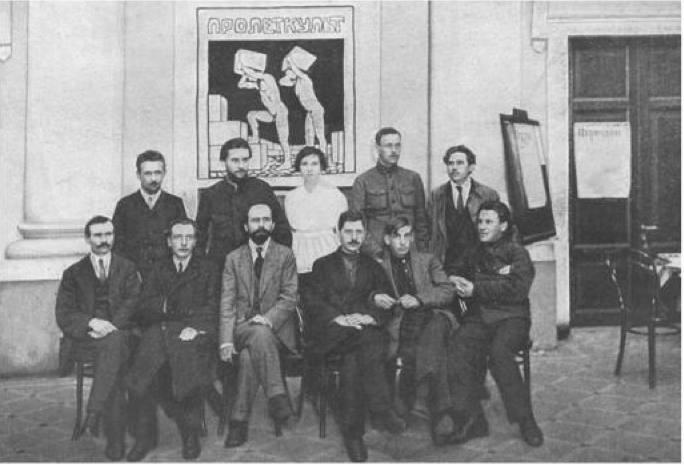
Praesidium of the national Proletkult organisation elected at the first national conference, September 1918. Sitting from left to right: Fedor Kalinin, Vladimir Faidysh, Pavel Lebedev-Polianskii, Aleksei Samobytnik-Mashirov I. I. Nikitin, Vasili Ignatov Standing from left to right: Stefan Krivtsov, Kārlis Ozols-Priednieks, Anna Dodonova, N. M. Vasilevskii, Vladimir Kirillov

Anna Andreevna Dodonova (1888–1967) was a Bolshevik activist and intellectual. She participated in the Bolshevik Revolution as a member of the Moscow Military Revolutionary Committee. Following the seizure of power she participated in the cultural division of the Moscow Soviet, serving as the head of the culture department. She was a member of the governing Presidium of Proletkult from its establishment in 1918 until disbandment in 1932.

From 1932 to 1935, she studied in postgraduate school and then engaged in scholarly and teaching work. She served as academic secretary of the Psychological Institute.

During the Great Patriotic War, she was chair of the Novosibirsk Regional Committee of MOPR.

She held a Doctor of Pedagogical Sciences degree and occupied senior positions in the Academy of Pedagogical Sciences. From 1957, she was on a personal pension.

She was married to Valerian Pletnev and helped him implement Lenin's plan to subordinate Proletkult as being entirely subordinate to the People's Commissariat for Education (Narkompros), which would in turn be subordinate to the Communist Party.

Dodonova died in 1967 and was buried at the Novodevichy Cemetery.
