= Valerian Pletnev =

Russian revolutionary, joiner and playwright

Valerian Fyodorovich Pletnyov (Russian: Валериан Фёдорович Плетнёв; 15 September 1886 – January 1942) was a Russian revolutionary who after many years as a joiner became a playwright and ideologue in the Proletkult, following the Russian Revolution.

He joined the Russian Social Democratic Labour Party in 1904. He worked as a carpenter, primarily in Moscow and Saint Petersburg, until 1917. He had two periods of exile, from 1911 to 1914 and then from 1915 to 1917. After the revolution he developed as a playwright and was very active in Proletkult, very much influenced by Alexander Bogdanov. He was chairman of the Central Committee of the Proletkult. His wife, Anna Dodonova, was also on the national presidium.

== 1922 articles in Pravda ==
In 1922 his article "On the Ideological Front" ("Na ideologicheskom fronte") was published in Pravda in September 1922. Here he defended Proletkult which was facing marginalization at that time. He rejected class compromise and the use of experts. He was against the participation of the peasantry, the bourgeoisie, and the intelligentsia in Proletkult. Proletarian culture was to be developed by the workers themselves and would provide a necessary antidote to the problems affecting post-revolutionary Soviet society. Influenced by Bogdanov, he defended the view that a proletarian science was necessary. He stated that the proletariat had to find new systems of knowledge, develop new ties between the different disciplines, which would require a monistic understanding of the world. As regards art, he stated that the new culture must be made by worker-artists, who aim to change the world, not merely to beautify it. He pointed out that the last four years in which Proletkult had existed was a very short period of time, compared to the period of the bourgeois domination of society.

In second article, "In the Proletkult" ("V Proletkulte"), published in Pravda, October 1922, he responded to his own question on whether "these first steps in proletarian culture should be considered as a utopian, unnecessary luxury?" by essentially arguing for continued state subsidies for Proletkult which were being reduced under the New Economic Policy. He praised the organizations literary output, including the role of drama as well as the development of production art.

== Later life ==
From 1933 to 1936 he was Deputy Head of the General Directorate of the Film Industry at the SNK of the USSR. After the start of the Great Patriotic War, Pletnyov volunteered for a people's militia in Moscow. He died in January 1942, aged 55.
