= Balodis =

Family name

Origin
- Origin: Latvian
- Meaning: "pigeon", "dove"

Other names
- Variant form: Baluodis

Balodis (Old orthography: Ballod; feminine: Balode) is a Latvian surname, derived from the Latvian word for "pigeon". Individuals with the surname include:

- Daniels Balodis (born 1998), Latvian footballer
- Jānis Balodis (1881–1965), army general and politician who was a principal figure in the foundation and government of independent Latvia
- Kārlis Balodis (1864–1931), Latvian economist, financist, statistician and demographist
- Ringolds Balodis (born 1986), Latvian politician
- Ves Balodis (1933–2020), Australian discus thrower who competed in the 1956 Summer Olympics

== See also ==
- 4391 Balodis
