= Latsis =

Latsis (Greek: Λάτσης; Russian: Ла́цис) can be either a Greek surname or a Russified form of the Latvian language surname Lācis. Individuals with the surname include:

- Spiros Latsis (born 1946), Greek banking and oil tycoon
- Yiannis Latsis (1910–2003), Greek shipping and oil tycoon
- Martin Latsis (1888–1938), Latvian-born Soviet politician, revolutionary and state security high officer
- Otto Latsis (1934–2005), Soviet and Russian journalist

== See also ==
- Latsis Foundation
