= Sarkani =

Sarkani may refer to:

- Sirkanay District, Konar Province, Afghanistan
- Sarkaņi parish, Latvia
