= Irbe (disambiguation) =

Irbe is a Latvian feminine name and surname.

Irbe may also refer to:

- Irbe River, Latvia
- Irbe Strait, Baltic Sea
