= Līvbērze Parish =

Parish of Latvia

- parish of Latvia
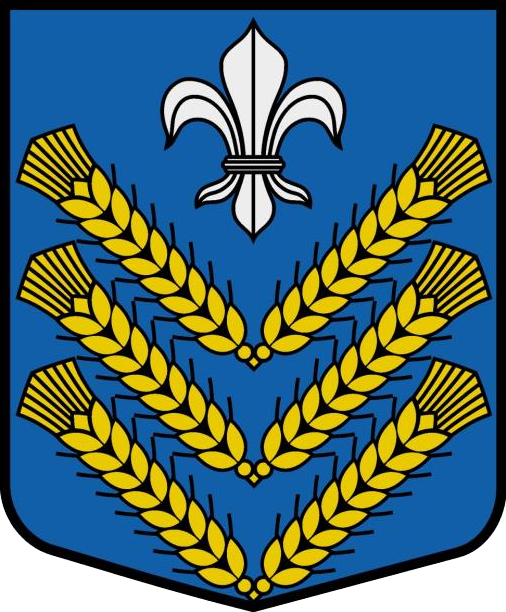
- Coat of arms

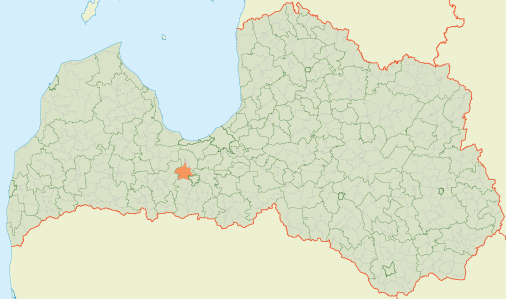
- Coordinates: 56°42′22″N 23°33′51″E
- Country: Latvia

Population (1 January 2026)
  - Total: 2,030

Līvbērze parish (Latvian: Līvbērzes pagasts) is an administrative unit of Jelgava Municipality in the Semigallia region of Latvia. Prior to the 2009 administrative reforms it was part of the Jelgava district

== Towns, villages and settlements of Līvbērze parish ==
- Līvbērze – parish administrative center

== Notable people from ==
- Kārlis Ozols-Priednieks (1896 July 1943).
