= Aleksandr Zugrin =

Russian painter

- Born: Aleksandr Ivanovich Zugrin; 1899
- Died: 1923 (aged 23–24)
- Known for: avant-garde painting Illustrations; Graphic design

Aleksandr Ivanovich Zugrin (Russian: Александр Иванович Зугрин; 1899–1923) was a Russian avant-garde painter, illustrator and graphic artist.

Zugrin was a member of Moscow Proletkult and soon became one of the most widely published artists in the period immediately following the Russian Revolution. He His provided engravings and lino-cuts as illustrations for journals such as Gorn (Furnace – published by Proletkult), Tvori! (Create! – Magazine of Ateliers of Moscow Proletkult), and Tvorchestvo (Creation), as well as the book jackets for various anthologies of proletarian poetry.
