= Viktors Eglītis =

Latvian poet

- Born: 15 April 1877; Sarkaņi Parish, Kreis Wenden, Governorate of Livonia, Russian Empire
- Died: 20 April 1945 (aged 68); Riga
- Occupation: Writer
- Spouse: Marija Eglīte (m. 1904–1926) Hilda Vīka (m. 1930–1945)

Viktors Eglītis (15 April 1877 – 20 April 1945) was a Latvian writer and art theorist. He was a leading figure in the Latvian decadent movement and an introducer of modernist poetics.

== Early life ==
Viktors Eglītis was born in Sarkaņi Parish on 15 April 1877. After dropping out of an Orthodox Christian seminary in Vitebsk, Eglītis studied drawing in Penza and enrolled at Maria Tenisheva's art studio in Saint Petersburg. There he became acquainted with the ideas of the Russian Silver Age and several of its prominent figures.

== Literary career ==
Back in Latvia, he adapted the ideas of Russian symbolism for Latvian literature and art theory. In 1902, he used the term "decadence" to designate his writings. In various articles, he laid out his poetics which were opposed to moral schemes, abstraction and realism, and instead promoted artistic individualism. He was well received by a number of young writers, who along with Eglītis wanted to refocus the language of poetry, which was dominated by well-defined lyrical forms and clear narratives, to symbols and signs that were not always easy to decipher. With this they wished to provide a sense of mystery and prophecy, and leave room for subtlety and subconscious impulses. This poetic is prominent in Eglītis' poetry collection Elēģijas (1907) and short story collection Vērtības pārvērtējot (1911). Eglītis also illustrated his own books with symbolic drawings. In addition to the enthusiasm from his followers, Eglītis' often aggressive introduction of modernist principles was also met with vocal opposition.

After the outbursts of his early works, the prolific Eglītis gradually turned to a more neoclassical and realistic expression; toward the end of his career he even launched the slogan "Away with modernism!" (Latvian: Nost ar modernismu!) In the 1920s he was an established and much read literary figure in Latvia, with works characterised by positivism and maximalism. From the end of the 1920s, he moved in an increasingly patriotic direction. He wrote historical fiction where he depicted the Baltic nations in opposition to other countries, primarily Germany. He turned to the Baltic neopaganism of the Dievturība movement. Late in his life he also came to express antisemitic views and support for the politics of Adolf Hitler.

== Death and legacy ==
In 1944, Eglītis was convicted in a Soviet court, accused of being a fascist collaborator. He died in prison on 20 April 1945. During the Soviet era, he was almost never discussed, remained unread and was largely forgotten. After Latvia regained its independence, Eglītis began to be rediscovered and gained status as the country's leading decadent writer. The literary scholar Vera Vāvere published a biography on Eglītis in 2012.

== Personal life ==
Eglītis married the teacher and translator Marija Eglīte (born Stalbova) in 1904. She died in 1926. In 1930 he married the painter and writer Hilda Vīka. With his first wife, he was the father of the writer, journalist and painter Anšlavs Eglītis (1906–1993).

== List of works ==
Bibliography adapted from Literatura.lv.

Poetry collections

- Elēģijas, 1907, self-published
- Hipokrēna, 1912, Zalktis
- Dievu sūtnes: sonetes, 1924, self-published
- Kastaļavots, 1924
- Zeme un mūžība, 1926, Latvju Kultūra
- Mana pasaule, 1937, Valters un Rapa
- Tīrā sēkla, 1942, Latvju Grānata

Epic poems

- Pelēkais barons. I. daļa, 1910, Imanta
- Upeslejas precības, 1920, Vaiņags
- Divas poēmas, 1921, Vaiņags
- Barons Maidels, 1923, Leta
- Pelēkais barons. II. daļa, 1933, Valters un Rapa

Prose fiction

- Vērtības pārvērtējot, short stories, 1911
- Latvietis Krievijā, novella, 1920, P. Liepa
- Līdzvainīgie, novel, 1920, A. Gulbis
- Dvēseles varā, novella, 1921, Leta
- Skolotāja Kalēja piedzīvojumi, novel, 1921
- Juku laikos. Zvēru dārzā, novellas, 1923, Valters un Rapa
- Laikmeta silueti, 1924, D. Zeltiņš
- Aizšautais vanags, 1924, Leta
- Mācītāja meita, 1924, Leta
- Nenovēršamie likteņi, novel, 1926, Valters un Rapa
- Tilti un pārigājēji, 1926, Leta
- Domājošā Rīga, 1934, self-published
- Lielā dzīve, short stories, 1936, A. Gulbis
- Meitenes stāsti, short stories, 1936, Zelta Grauds
- Apskaidrotie un mācītie, short stories, 1942, Kreišmanis

Drama

- Ceļa biedri: traģikomēdija, 1921, A. Gulbis
- Lauku miljonārs jeb re' kur vīrs!: komēdija, 1923, J. Roze
- Ministru sievas: komēdija, 1924, Valters un Rapa

Literary criticism

- Poruks, 1903, Burtnieks
- Fallijs: monogrāfija, 1921
- Andrievs Niedra savā dzīvē un darbos: monogrāfija, 1923, Lapsene

== See also ==
- List of unsolved deaths
