= Iribe =

Iribe is a surname of different origins. It may be of Basque or Japanese (入部) origin. Notable people with the surname include:

- Abraham Velázquez Iribe (born 1953), Mexican politician
- Brendan Iribe (born 1979), American computer programmer and businessman
- Paul Iribe (1883–1935), French illustrator and designer
- Shōtarō Iribe (born 1989), Japanese cyclist

== See also ==
- Irbe (disambiguation)
