= Ozoliņš =

Origin
- Origin: Latvian
- Meaning: "little oak"

Other names
- Variant form: Ozolin

Ozoliņš (Old orthography: O(h)solin(g); feminine: Ozoliņa) is a Latvian surname, derived from the Latvian word for "oak" (ozols). Individuals with the surname include:

- Alberts Ozoliņš (1896–1985), Latvian weightlifter
- Brigita Ozolins, Australian installation artist
- Kārlis Ozoliņš (1905–1987), Latvian Soviet politician and journalist
- Kārlis Ozoliņš (born 1994), Latvian ice hockey player
- Kārlis Ozoliņš (born 2002), Latvian tennis player
- Sandis Ozoliņš (born 1972), Latvian ice hockey player
- Valdemārs Ozoliņš (1896–1973), Latvian composer and conductor

== See also ==
- Ozolin
- Ozols
