= Proletkult =

Soviet cultural and artistic organization

- Proletarian Culture
- Пролеткульт
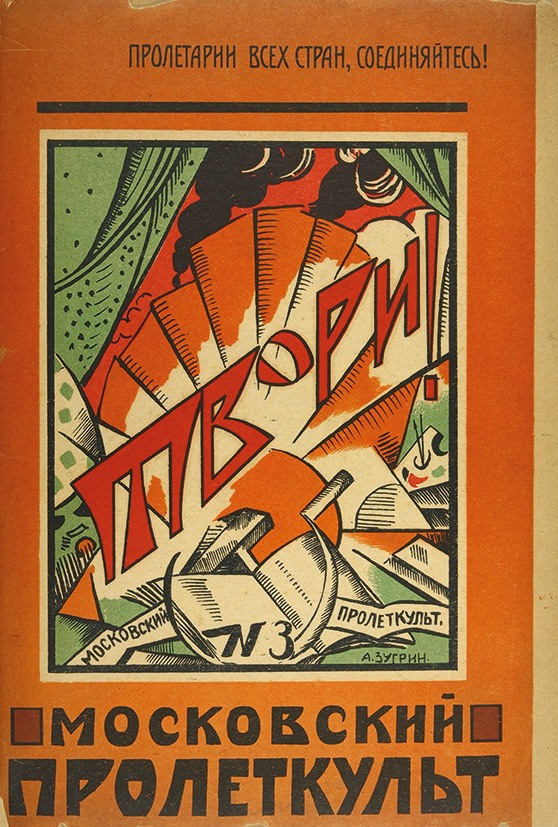
- Cover of the Moscow Proletkult journal Tvori! (Create!), no. 2 (1921), by Aleksandr Zugrin
- Formation: October 1917; 109 years ago
- Founder: Anatoly Lunacharsky
- Founded at: Moscow
- Dissolved: April 1932; 94 years ago
- Members: 84,000 (1920)
- Key people: Anatoly Lunacharsky; Alexander Bogdanov; Larissa Reissner; Fedor Kalinin; Pavel Lebedev-Polianskii; Valerian Pletnev; Platon Kerzhentsev
- Main organ: Proletarskaya Kul'tura
- Parent organization: People's Commissariat for Education

Proletkult (Russian: Пролеткульт, IPA: [prəlʲɪtˈkulʲt]), a portmanteau of the Russian words "proletarskaya kultura" (proletarian culture), was an experimental Soviet artistic institution that arose in conjunction with the Russian Revolution of 1917. This organization, a federation of local cultural societies and avant-garde artists, was most prominent in the visual, literary, and dramatic fields. Proletkult aspired to radically modify existing artistic forms by creating a new, revolutionary working-class aesthetic, which drew its inspiration from the construction of modern industrial society in agrarian Russia.

Although funded by the People's Commissariat for Education of Soviet Russia, the Proletkult organization sought autonomy from state control, a demand which brought it into conflict with the Communist Party hierarchy and the Soviet state bureaucracy. Some top party leaders, such as Lenin, sought to concentrate state funding and retain it from such artistic endeavors. He and others also saw in Proletkult a concentration of bourgeois intellectuals and potential political oppositionists.

At its peak in 1920, Proletkult had 84,000 members actively enrolled in about 300 local studios, clubs, and factory groups, with an additional 500,000 members participating in its activities on a more casual basis.

== History ==
=== Factional background ===
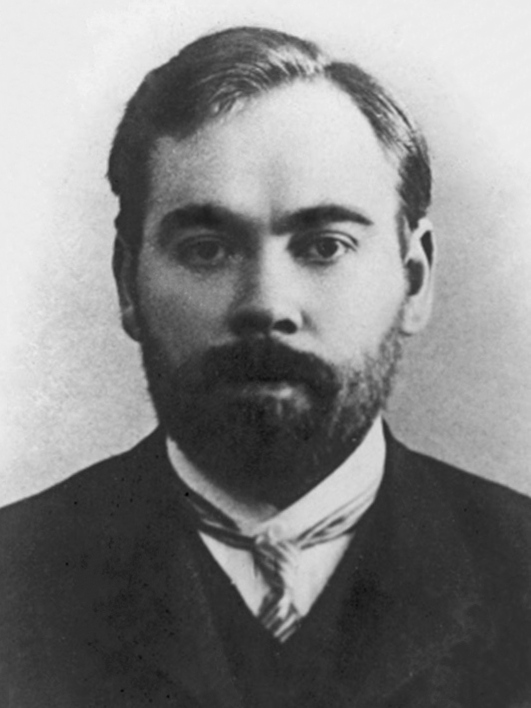
Bolshevik philosopher Alexander Bogdanov, one of the founding fathers of the Proletkult movement

The earliest roots of the Proletarian Culture movement, better known as Proletkult, are found in the aftermath of the failed 1905–1907 Revolution against Nicholas II of Russia. The censorship apparatus of the Tsarist regime had stumbled briefly during the upheaval, broadening horizons, but the revolution had ultimately failed, resulting in dissatisfaction and second-guessing, even within Bolshevik Party ranks.

In the aftermath of the Tsar's reassertion of authority a radical political tendency known as the "Left Bolsheviks" emerged, stating their case in opposition to party leader Lenin. This group, which included philosophers Alexander Bogdanov and Anatoly Lunacharsky and writer Maxim Gorky, argued that the intelligentsia-dominated Bolsheviks must begin following more inclusive tactics and working to develop more working class political activists to assume leadership roles in the next round of anti-Tsarist revolution.

Among the Left Bolsheviks, Anatoly Lunacharsky in particular had been intrigued with the possibility of making use of art as a means to inspire revolutionary political action. In addition, together with the celebrated Gorky, Lunacharsky hoped to found a "human religion" around the idea of socialism, motivating individuals to serve a greater good outside of their own narrow self-interests.

Working along similar lines simultaneously was Lunacharsky's brother-in-law Bogdanov, who even in 1904 had published a weighty philosophical tome called Empiriomonism which attempted to integrate the ideas of non-Marxist thinkers Ernst Mach and Richard Avenarius into the socialist edifice. (Lunacharsky had studied under Avenarius in Zurich and was responsible for introducing Bogdanov to his ideas.) Bogdanov believed that the socialist society of the future would require forging a fundamentally new perspective of the role of science, ethics, and art with respect to the individual and the state.

Together all these ideas of Bogdanov, Lunacharsky, Gorky, and their co-thinkers came to be known in the language of the day as "god-building" (bogostroitel'stvo).

These ideas did not exist in a vacuum; there was a political component as well. During the period between the failure of the 1905 revolution and the outbreak of World War I, Alexander Bogdanov stood as the chief rival to Lenin for leadership of the Bolshevik party.

To the intellectually rigid Lenin, Bogdanov was not only a political rival, but also a positive threat to the ideology of Marxism. Lenin saw Bogdanov and the "god-building" movement with which he was associated as purveyors of a reborn philosophical idealism that stood in diametrical opposition to the fundamental materialist foundation of Marxism. So disturbed was Lenin that he spent much of 1908 combing more than 200 books to pen a thick polemical volume in reply — Materialism and Empirio-Criticism: Critical Comments on a Reactionary Philosophy.

Lenin ultimately emerged triumphant in the struggle for hegemony of the Bolshevik faction. Relations between them in Western European exile remained tense. During the first decade of the 20th Century Bogdanov wrote two works of utopian science fiction about socialist societies on Mars, both of which were rejected by Lenin as attempts to smuggle "Machist idealism" into the radical movement. The second of these, a book called Engineer Menni (1913), was pronounced by Lenin to be "so vague that neither a worker nor a stupid editor at Pravda [a rival publication] could understand it." In 1913 Bogdanov, a student of the Taylor system of factory work-flow rationalization, published a massive work on the topic, General Organizational Science, which Lenin liked no better.

The pair went their separate ways, with Bogdanov dropping out of radical politics at the end of 1913, returning home with his wife to Moscow. He would later be reinvigorated by the course of events to become a leading figure in the Moscow Proletkult organization — a fact which emphasizes the tension between that organization and state authorities.

=== Birth of Proletkult ===
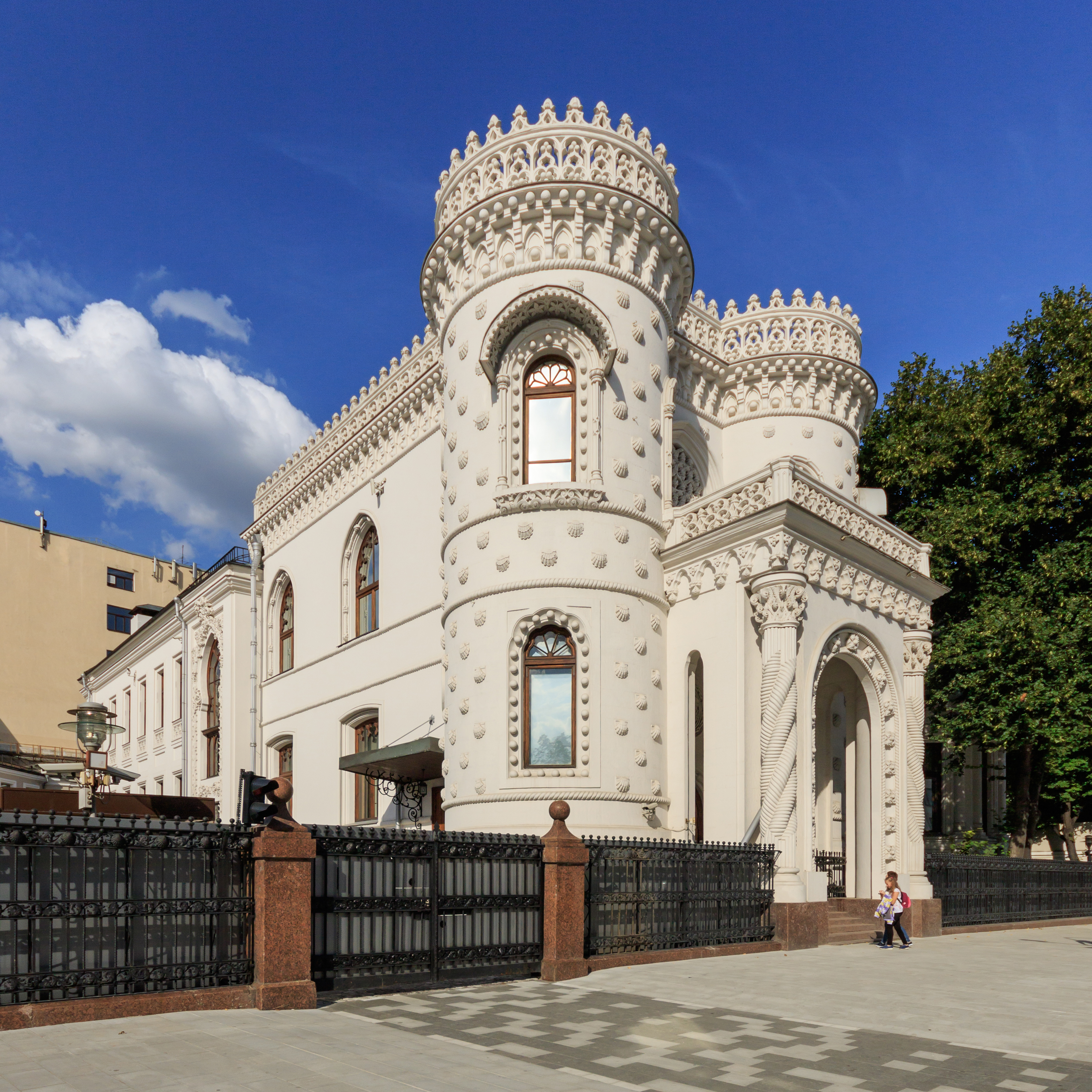
The Arseny Morozov House in Moscow was occupied as the home of Proletkult

==== Preliminary conference ====
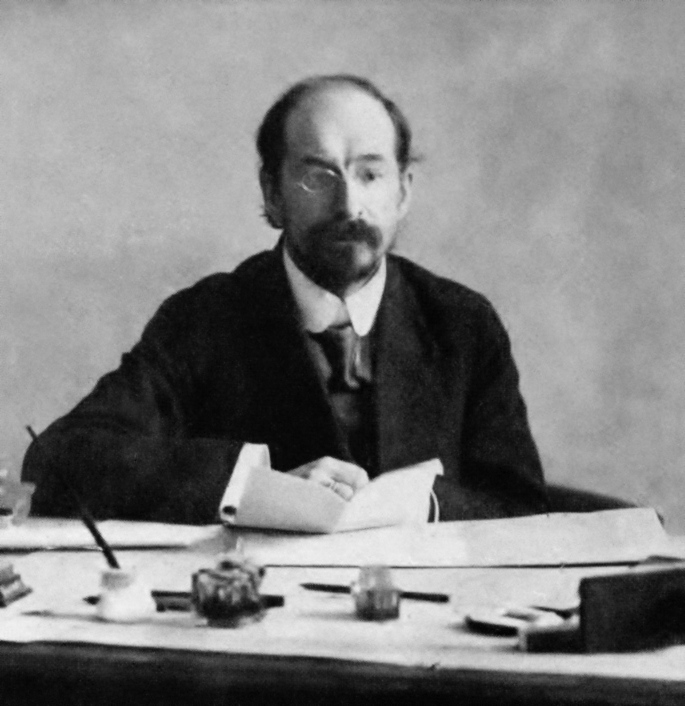
Anatoly Lunacharsky, a founding father of the Proletkult organization, was People's Commissar of Education of Soviet Russia from 1917 to 1929

Following the abdication of the Tsar and the success of the February Revolution of 1917, the October Revolution ousted the Russian Provisional Government of Alexander Kerensky and brought the Bolsheviks to power, which subsequently let to the Russian Civil War.

The radical intelligentsia of Russia was mobilized by these events. Anatoly Lunacharsky, who had briefly broken with Lenin and the Bolshevik Party to become a newspaper correspondent in France and Italy, returned to Russia in May 1917 and rejoined the party in August. Following the October Revolution, Lunacharsky was appointed Commissar of Education of the new government.

Lunacharsky's factional ally, Alexander Bogdanov, remained sharply critical of Lenin and his political tactics and never rejoined the Communist Party, however. Instead he served at the front as a doctor during World War I, returning home to Moscow in 1917 and becoming involved there as a founder of the Proletarian Culture organization, Proletkult.

The aim of unifying the cultural and educational activities of the Russian labour movements first occurred at the Agitation Collegium of the Executive Committee of the Petrograd Soviet which met on 19 July 1917 with 120 participants. It was attended by many different currents, and when the Menshevik Dementiev suggested that the meeting just be confined to public lectures and that the Bolsheviks should be excluded, but this was soundly rejected. Consequently, the Central Council of Factory Committees was instructed to work with the Petrograd Soviet to organise a second conference of "proletarian cultural-educational organizations" to bring them together in a centralized organization. A first conference of these groups was held in Petrograd from October 16 to 19, 1917 (O.S.). The conclave was called by Lunacharsky in his role as head of the Cultural-Educational Commission of the Petrograd Bolshevik organization and was attended by 208 delegates representing Petrograd trade unions, factory committees, army and youth groups, city and regional dumas, as well as the Petrograd Committee of the Bolshevik and Socialist-Revolutionary parties.

This October 1917 conference elected a Central Committee of Proletarian Cultural-Educational Organizations of Petrograd which included among its members Lunacharsky, Lenin's wife Nadezhda Krupskaya, talented young journalist Larisa Reisner, and a long-time Vpered associate of Bogdanov and Lunacharsky named Fedor Kalinin, among others. Also playing a key role was the future Chairman of the Organising Bureau of the National Proletkult, Pavel Lebedev-Polianskii, another former member of Bogdanov and Lunacharsky's émigré political group. Many of these would be catapulted into leading roles in the People's Commissariat of Education following the Bolshevik seizure of power which followed less than two weeks later.

==== After the Bolshevik seizure of state power ====
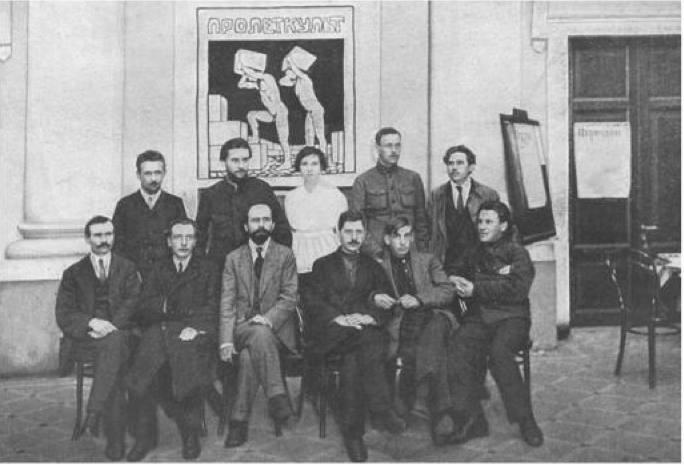
Praesidium of the national Proletkult organisation elected at the first national conference, September 1918. Sitting from left to right: Fedor Kalinin, Vladimir Faidysh, Pavel Lebedev-Polianskii, Aleksei Samobytnik-Mashirov I. I. Nikitin and Vasili Ignatov. Standing from left to right: Stefan Krivtsov, Karl Ozol-Prednek, Anna Dodonova, N. M. Vasilevskii and Vladimir Kirillov

The October Revolution led to a marked increase in the number of new cultural organizations and informal groups. Clubs and cultural societies sprung up affiliated with newly empowered factories, unions, cooperatives, and workers' and soldiers' councils, in addition to similar groups attached to more formal institutions such as the Red Army, the Communist Party, and its youth section. The new government of Soviet Russia was quick to understand that these rapidly proliferating clubs and societies offered a potentially powerful vehicle for the spread of the radical political, economic, and social theories it favored.

The chief cultural authority of the Soviet state was its People's Commissariat of Education (Narkompros), a bureaucratic apparatus which quickly came to include no fewer than 17 different departments. Headed by Anatoly Lunacharsky, this organization sought to expand adult literacy and to establish a broad and balanced general school curricula, in opposition to pressure from the trade unions and the Supreme Council of National Economy, which sought to give preference to vocational education. The as-yet loosely organized Proletkult movement emerged as another potential competitor to the primacy of Narkompros.

This confusing welter of competing institutions and organizations was by no means unique to the cultural field, as historian Lynn Mally has noted:

All early Soviet institutions struggled against what was called 'parallelism,' the duplication of services by competing bureaucratic systems. The revolution raised difficult questions about governmental organization that were only slowly answered during the first years of the regime. Political activists disputed the authority of the central state, the role of the Communist Party within it, and the influence national agencies should wield over local groups. Altercations over scarce resources and institutional authority were intertwined with theoretical debates over the ideal structure of the new policy.

Moreover, in the early revolutionary period control over local institutions by the central government of the Soviet state was weak, with factory workers often ignoring their trade unions and teachers the curriculum instructions of central authorities. In this political environment any centrally-devised scheme for a division of authority between Narkompros and the federated artistic societies of Proletkult remained largely a theoretical exercise. In the early days of the Bolshevik regime the local apparatus of Proletkult retained the most powerful hand.

With its adherent Anatoly Lunacharsky at the helm of Narkompros, the Proletkult movement had an important patron with considerable influence over state policy and the purse. This did not mean an easy relationship between these institutions, however. Early in 1918 leaders of Petrograd Proletkult refused to cooperate with an effort by Narkompros to form a citywide theatre organization, declaring their refusal to work with non-proletarian theatre groups.

Moscow Proletkult, in which Alexander Bogdanov played a leading role, attempted to extend its independent sphere of control even further than the Petrograd organization, addressing questions of food distribution, hygiene, vocational education, and issuing a call for establishment of a proletarian university at its founding convention in February 1918. Some hardliners in the Proletkult organization even insisted that Proletkult be recognized as the "ideological leader of all public education and enlightenment."

Ultimately, however, the vision of Proletkult as the rival and guiding light of Narkompros fell by the wayside, subdued by the Proletkult's financial reliance on the Commissariat for operational funding. Proletkult received a budget of 9.2 million gold rubles for the first half of 1918 — nearly one-third of the entire budget for Narkompros's Adult Educational Division. Requisitioned buildings were put to the organization's use, with the Petrograd organization receiving a large and posh facility located on one of the city's main thoroughfares, Nevsky Prospect — the name of which was actually changed to "Proletkult Street" (Ulitsa Proletkul'ta) in the organization's honor.

=== Proletarskaya Kul'tura ===
Proletarskaya Kul'tura (Proletarian Culture) was a journal issued by Proletkult from July 1918 to February 1921. The issues had a series numbered up to 21, which with double issues comprised 13 different publications

=== Development ===
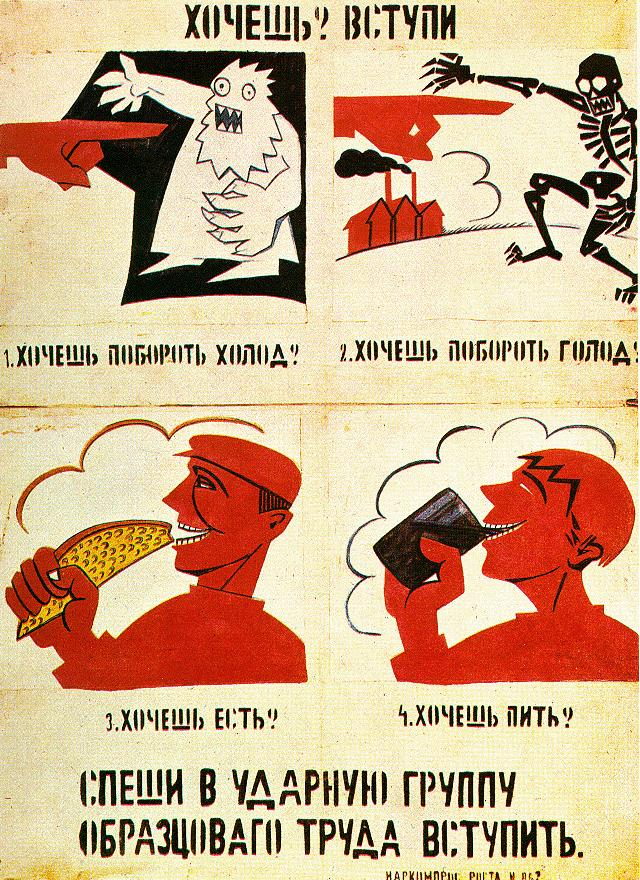
The poet as graphic artist: "proletarian art" in a civil war era poster by the futurist poet Vladimir Mayakovsky, published by Narkompros. Mayakovsky makes use of stencil, simple agitational poetry and primitive workerist graphics to create an almost folk art effect.

While the Proletkult movement began as independent groups in Petrograd (October 1917) and Moscow (February 1918), it was not long before the group's patrons in the Soviet state intervened to help forge a national organization. The Soviet government itself moved from Petrograd to Moscow in March 1918 and the center of Proletkult's own organizational gravity shifted simultaneously.

Lines became blurred between the Proletkult organization and the Division for Proletarian Culture of the People's Commissariat of Education, headed by Proletkult activist Fyodor Kalinin. While the organization retained its staunch supporters in the Narkompros apparatus seeking to coordinate activities, it also contained no small number of activists like Alexander Bogdanov who tried to promote the organization as an independent cultural institution with a homogeneous working class constituency.

In September 1918, the first national conference of Proletkult was convened in Moscow, including 330 delegates and 234 guests from local organizations from around Soviet Russia. While no delegate list has survived, the stenogram of the conference indicates that the bulk of attendees hailed from trade unions, factory organizations, cooperatives, and workers' clubs. Delegates were split between those favoring an autonomous and leading role for the organization in general education in Soviet society and those who favored a more narrow focus for the group as a subordinate part of the Narkompros bureaucracy.

While those favoring autonomy were in the majority at the first national conference, the ongoing problem of organizational finance remained a real one, as historian Lynn Mally has observed:

Although the Proletkult was autonomous, it still expected Narkompros to foot the bills. The government would supply the central Proletkult with a subsidy, to be distributed among provincial affiliates. But because financial dependence on the state clearly contradicted the organization's claims to independence, the central leaders held out the hope that their affiliates would soon discover their own means of support.

Proletkult and its desire for autonomy also had another powerful patron in the person of Nikolai Bukharin, editor of Pravda. Bukharin provided favorable coverage for Proletkult during the organization's formative period, welcoming the idea that the group represented a "laboratory of pure proletarian ideology" with a legitimate claim to independence from Soviet governmental control.

Proletkult made use of different organizational forms. In large industrial cities, the organization set up an elaborate bureaucratic apparatus resembling that of Narkompros. Moscow Proletkult, for example, had departments for literary publishing, theatre, music, art, and clubs. In addition to this central bureaucracy, Proletkult established factory cells attached to the highly concentrated mills and manufacturing facilities. Finally, Proletkult established "studios" — independent facilities in which workers learned and developed the techniques of the various arts.

Narkompros, for its part, sought to influence Proletkult to concentrate its efforts upon the expansion of the network of studios. In April 1919, People's Commissar of Education Lunacharsky declared that Proletkult "should concentrate all its attention on studio work, on the discovery and encouragement of original talent among the workers, on the creation of circles of writers, artists, and all kinds of young scholars from the working class".

Proletkult and its studios and clubs gained a certain measure of popularity among a broad segment of the urban Russian population, particularly factory workers. By the end of 1918 the organization counted 147 local affiliates, although the actual number of functioning units was probably somewhat fewer.

At the peak of the organization's strength in 1920, Proletkult claimed a total of 84,000 members in 300 local groups, with an additional 500,000 more casual followers.

Cover of Gorn (Furnace), an official organ of Proletkult, designed by Aleksandr Zugrin

A total of 15 different Proletkult periodicals were produced over the course of the organization's short existence, including most importantly Proletarskaia kultura (Proletarian Culture — 1918 to 1921) and Gorn (Furnace — 1918 to 1923).

=== Ideology ===
Historically, the relationship between the Russian liberal intelligentsia and the working class was that of teacher and student. This situation presumed a "higher" level of culture on the part of the aristocratic teachers — an accepted premise of the Bolsheviks themselves during the pre-revolutionary period.

Under Marxist theory, however, culture was conceived as a part of the superstructure associated with the dominant class in society — in the Russian instance, that of the bourgeoisie. Under a workers' state, some Marxist theoreticians believed, the new proletarian ruling class would develop its own distinct class culture to supplant the former culture of the old ruling order. Proletkult was seen as a primary vehicle for the development of this new "proletarian culture."

The nature and function of Proletkult was described by Platon Kerzhentsev, one of the movement's top leaders in 1919:

The task of the 'Proletkults' is the development of an independent proletarian spiritual culture, including all areas of the human spirit — science, art, and everyday life. The new socialist epoch must produce a new culture, the foundations of which are already being laid. This culture will be the fruit of the creative efforts of the working class and will be entirely independent. Work on behalf of proletarian culture should stand on a par with the political and economic struggle of the working class.

But in creating its own culture, the working class by no means should reject the rich cultural heritage of the past, the material and spiritual achievements, made by classes which are alien and hostile to the proletariat. The proletarian must look it over critically, choose what is of value, elucidate it with his own point of view, use it with a view to producing his own culture.

This work on a new culture ought to proceed along a completely independent path. 'Proletkults' should be class-restricted, workers' organizations, completely autonomous in their activities.

Proletkult's theorists generally espoused a hardline economic determinism, arguing that only purely working class organizations were capable of advancing the cause of the dictatorship of the proletariat. An early editorial from the official Proletkult journal Proletarskaia Kultura (Proletarian Culture) demanded that "the proletariat start right now, immediately, to create its own socialist forms of thought, feeling, and daily life, independent of alliances or combinations of political forces."

In the view of Alexander Bogdanov and other Proletkult theoreticians, the arts were not the province of a specially gifted elite, but rather were the physical output of individuals with a set of learned skills. All that was required, it was assumed, was for one to study basic artistic technique in a very few lessons, after which anyone was capable of becoming a proletarian artist. The movement by Proletkult to establish a network of studios in which workers could enroll was seen as an essential part of training this new cohort of proletarian artists.

Despite the organization's rhetoric about its proletarian exclusivity, however, the movement was guided by intellectuals throughout its entire brief history, with its efforts to promote workers from the bench to leadership positions largely unsuccessful.

=== Influence on the various arts ===
==== Literature ====
Proletkult expended great energy in attempting to launch a wave of worker-poets, with only limited artistic success. The insistence upon developing new poets of questionable talent led to a split of the Proletkult in 1919, when a large group of young writers, most of whom were poets, broke from the organization due to what they believed to be a stifling of individual creative talent.

These defectors from Proletkult initially formed a small, elite organization called Kuznitsa (The Forge) before again launching a new mass organization known as the All-Russian Association of Proletarian Writers (VAPP) a year later.

==== Theater ====
The Proletkult organizations of Petrograd and Moscow controlled their own dramatic theatrical network, including under its umbrella a number of smaller city clubs maintaining their own theatrical studios. Petrograd Proletkult opened a large central studio early in 1918 which staged a number of new and experimental works with a view to inspiring similar performances in other amateur theaters around the city. Moscow Proletkult opened its own central theater several months later.

Proletkult constituted the leading center of a radical minority within the theatrical community of the day which aspired to promote so-called "proletarian theater." Development of this new form was defined in one early conference resolution as "the task of workers themselves, along with those peasants who are willing to accept their ideology." Conventional modes of performance were discouraged, in favor of unconventional stagings designed to promote "mass action" — including public processions, festivals, and social dramas.

=== Contemporary criticism ===
Artists in the Proletkult movement, while not by any means a homogeneous bloc, were influenced to a great extent by the iconoclasm, technological orientation, and revolutionary enthusiasm bound up in the thematic movements of the day, futurism and constructivism. Despite lip service paid to classical forms of poetry, drama, writing, sculpture, and painting, strong encouragement was given to the use of new techniques and forms in so-called "proletarian art," including the use of photography, cinematography, and collage.

This commitment to experimentalism drew the fire of those party leaders who preferred more classical modes of artistic expression. Petrograd Communist Party leader Grigory Zinoviev took the lead at a conference of "proletarian writers" held in that city in the fall of 1919, declaring that while previously "we allowed the most nonsensical futurism to get a reputation almost as the official school of Communist art" and let "doubtful elements attach themselves to our Proletkults." it was henceforth "time to put an end to this," Zinoviev demanded.

Also among those critical of the Proletkult movement and its vision to create a wholly new proletarian culture was top Soviet party leader Vladimir Lenin. At a public speech in May 1919 Lenin declared any notions of so-called "proletarian culture" to be "fantasies" which he opposed with "ruthless hostility."

More specifically, Lenin had profound misgivings about the entire institution of Proletkult, viewing it as (in historian Sheila Fitzpatrick's words) "an organization where futurists, idealists, and other undesirable bourgeois artists and intellectuals addled the minds of workers who needed basic education and culture..." Lenin also may have had political misgivings about the organization as a potential base of power for his long-time rival Alexander Bogdanov or for ultra-radical "Left Communists" and the syndicalist dissidents who comprised the Workers' Opposition.

=== Dissolution ===
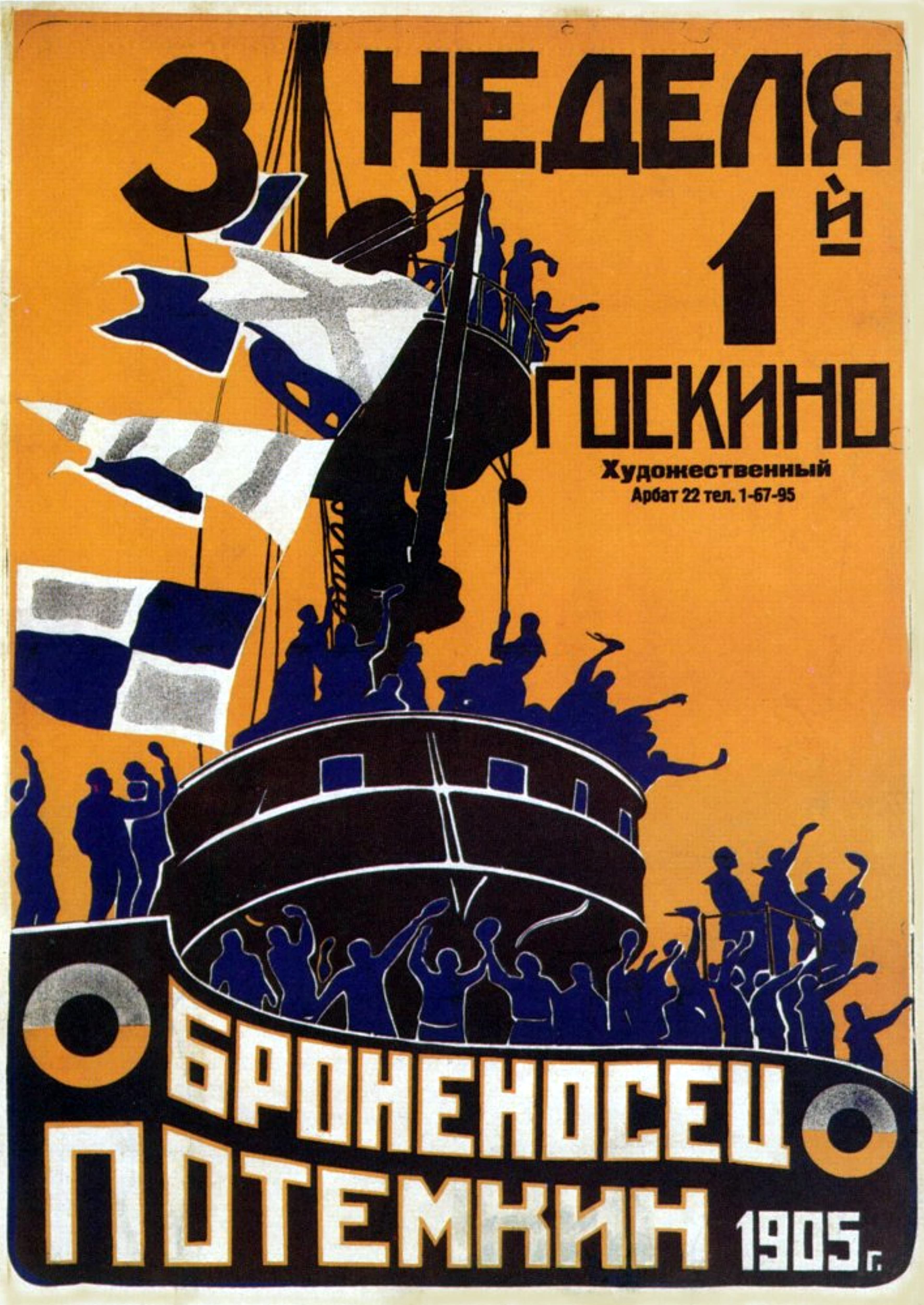
The ethic of Proletkult is found in the early cinematic works of Sergei Eisenstein. This promotional poster for his 1926 film The Battleship Potemkin, which makes use of indistinct masses of people and diagonal lines, is exemplary of constructivism.

By the fall of 1920, it became increasingly clear that the Soviet regime would emerge from the Russian Civil War victorious. With the fall of the Whites, a common enemy which united disparate factions around the Soviet banner, much unity was loosened. Dissident groups such as the so-called Workers' Opposition and the Democratic Centralists emerged in the Communist Party, widespread dissatisfaction among the peasantry over forced grain requisitioning resulted in isolated uprisings. All of these factors prompted a wave of debate about the institutions that had sprung up in Soviet society during wartime, including Proletkult.

Throughout its short history, Proletkult had sought both autonomy from state control and hegemony in the cultural field. This had created a substantial number of critics and rivals. These included leaders of the Soviet trade union movement, who saw the management of workers' cultural opportunities as part of their own purview; local Communist Party committees, which sought centralization under their own direction rather than a hodge-podge of autonomous civic institutions; and the People's Commissariat of Education (Narkompros), which believed its own mission included the cultural training of the working class. Of these, Narkompros proved the most outspoken and unyielding in its criticism.

Ever since 1918 Nadezhda Krupskaya — the wife of Vladimir Lenin — had sought to rein in Proletkult and integrate it under the agency in which she herself played a leading role, the Adult Education Division of Narkompros. A May 1919 conference of adult education workers had, spurred on by Krupskaya, determined that Proletkult was an adult education agency owing to its studio system, and therefore rightfully part of Narkompros.

Bureaucratic wrangling between top leaders of Proletkult and the Adult Education Division of Narkompros had produced a working agreement in the summer of 1919 bringing Proletkult formally under the auspices of the latter, albeit with its own separate budget. This proved, however, to be a stop-gap and institutional conflict remained.

Proletkult leaders subsequently made an effort to expand their movement on an international basis at the 2nd World Congress of the Communist International in August 1920, founding Kultintern, an international organization headed by Anatoly Lunacharsky. The group's grandiose vision and practical efforts to expand the Proletkult movement globally was particularly concerning to Lenin, himself a man of staid and traditional cultural tastes who had already come to see Proletkult as utopian and wasteful.

Spurred to action by Lenin, in the fall of 1920 the governing Central Committee of the Russian Communist Party (bolsheviks) began to take an active interest in the relationship of Proletkult with other Soviet institutions for the first time. Lenin sought and obtained information from Mikhail Pokrovsky, second in command at Narkompros, and top Proletkult leaders about the organization's budget and semi-independent status and pushed through a decision to absorb Proletkult into Narkompros to end the situation of parallelism once and for all.

The already scheduled National Congress of Proletkult, held in Moscow from October 5 to 12, 1920, was to be the occasion for the announcement. While Lunacharsky, head of Narkompros but a patron of Proletkult and its interests, dragged his feet on the merger, the congress eventually — following long debate and a stern appeal to party discipline — formally approved the Central Committee's decision to directly integrate Proletkult into Narkompros.

The integration was not a smooth one, however, and Proletkult activists fought to the last ditch to retain organizational autonomy even within Narkompros. The Central Committee reacted with a scathing decree denouncing Proletkult that was published in Pravda on December 1, 1920.

=== Legacy ===
Despite its formal termination as an organization, the Proletkult movement continued to influence and inform early Soviet culture. Historian Peter Kenez has noted the heavy influence of the Proletkult ethic in the work of pioneer Soviet filmmaker Sergei Eisenstein, director of the classic films Strike (1925), The Battleship Potemkin (1926), and October: Ten Days That Shook the World (1927):

The intellectual content of [Eisenstein's] early films was profoundly influenced by his earlier association with Proletkult, a complex politicocultural movement that reached the height of its influence during the revolutionary period. [...] [Its leaders] argued that the new, socialist culture would be profoundly different from what it replaced. In their view there could be no accommodation with the old world; the proletariat on the basis of its experience would create a new culture that would reflect the spirit of the collective. It followed that the new art had to emphasize not the accomplishments of individuals but those of the workers and peasants. Eisenstein was attracted to this movement because it justified the necessity of a complete break with the art of the 'bourgeois' world. All of his early films expressed, though in his own idiom, the ideology of Proletkult.

==== Resurgence of interest later in the twentieth century ====
There was a resurgence of interest in Bogdanov and Proletkult in the 1960s and 1970's. Dietrich Grille's PhD thesis Lenins Rival submitted in 1964 and published in 1966 was acclaimed by Zenovia Sochor in 1988 as "the most thorough of the early works".

==== Twenty first century interest ====
In 2018, the avant-garde writing collective Wu Ming published the New Italian Epic novel Proletkult.

== See also ==
- Proletcult Theatre
- Russian Association of Proletarian Writers
- Socialist realism
- Working-class culture
