= Mucenieks =

Origin
- Origin: Latvian
- Meaning: "cooper"

Mucenieks (Old orthography: Mutzeneek; feminine: Muceniece) is a Latvian occupational surname, derived from the Latvian word for "cooper". Individuals with the surname include:

- Agata Muceniece (born 1989), Latvian actress, model, and television presenter
- Aina Muceniece (1924–2010), Latvian doctor, inventor of the RIGVIR virotherapy
- Guntars Mucenieks, Latvian musician from Līvi
- Aivars Mucenieks, mayor of Ventspils Municipality, Latvia (as of 2013)
- Elvijs Mucenieks, Latvian sidecarcrosser
- Jēkabs Mucenieks, Brand designer
