= Brīvā Latvija =

Latvian newspaper

- Masthead
- Type: Weekly newspaper
- Format: Tabloid
- Owner: Latvian Publishers Association
- Publisher: ELPA
- Editor: Ligita Kovtuna
- Founded: 1986
- Language: Latvian
- Headquarters: Riga, Latvia, and Catthorpe, Leics., UK
- Price: Ls 0.40 in Latvia, varies elsewhere
- ISSN: 0934-6759
- Website: www.brivalatvija.lv

Brīvā Latvija (Free Latvia; ISSN 0934-6759) is a weekly newspaper for Latvians living outside Latvia, aimed mainly at those residing in western Europe. It was founded in 1986 through the merger of two émigré newspapers: the UK-based Londonas Avīze (London News; founded 1942) and Latvija (Latvia; founded 1946 in postwar DP camps), based in West Germany. BL is co-owned by the Latvian communities of western Europe. The Latvian communities in Britain, Germany, and Sweden each provide members for the newspaper's board. In the mid-1990s, after Latvia regained its independence, the printing of BL was moved for economic reasons to Riga, where the editorial office also later moved. This newspaper also uses the older Latvian orthography, with the letters Ch, Ō, and Ŗ. Those letters have since been abandoned from use in the Latvian language.

== See also ==
- Laiks (New York)
- Latvija Amerikā (Toronto)
