= Dietrich Grille =

German historian (1935–2011)

Dietrich Grille (25 November 1935 Gotha – 19 March 2011, Nuremberg) was a German political scientist and historian.

Grille studied in Jena and University of Marburg, where he received his doctorate in December 1964. His thesis concerning Alexander Bogdanov rivalry with Lenin. An edition of his PhD dissertation, Lenins Rivale, was published in 1966. This was regarded as being very thorough by subsequent scholars studying Bogdanov.

In 2005 he was awarded the Order of Merit of the Federal Republic of Germany.

== Works ==
- 1966 Lenins Rivale: Bogdanov und seine Philosophie Cologne: Verlag Wissenschaft und Politik
