= Kharino, Beryozovsky District, Perm Krai =

Kharino Харино
- Village
- Location within Perm Krai Location within Russia
- Coordinates: 57°32′N 57°47′E
- Country: Russia
- Region: Perm Krai
- District: Beryozovsky District
- Time zone: UTC+5:00

Kharino (Russian: Харино) is a rural locality (a village) in Asovskoye Rural Settlement, Beryozovsky District, Perm Krai, Russia. The population was 16 as of 2010. There are 3 streets.

== Geography ==
Kharino is located 34 km southeast of Beryozovka, the district's administrative centre, by road. Makaryata is the nearest rural locality.
