= Hilda Vīka =

Latvian artist, writer and poet

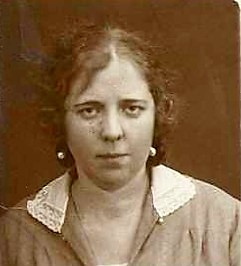
- 1928 passport photo of Hilda Vīka
- Born: Hildegarde Natālija Vīka; 5 November 1897; Riga
- Died: 14 February 1963 (aged 65); Riga
- Other names: Hilda Vīka-Eglīte
- Education: Tautas augstskola
- Occupations: Artist; Writer
- Spouse: Viktors Eglītis (m. 1930–1945)

Hilda Vīka (5 November 1897 – 14 February 1963), also known as Hilda Vīka-Eglīte, was a Latvian artist and writer. She made stylised watercolour and oil paintings of everyday life and dreamy visions. She wrote poetry, short stories and novels, illustrating her own works. Beginning in the 1930s, she incorporated Latvian mythology in her works. During the Soviet era she adapted to socialist realism but was expelled from the artist union for most of the 1950s. She was married to the writer Viktors Eglītis.

== Early life and education ==
Hildegarde Natālija Vīka, known as Hilda Vīka, was born in Riga on 5 November 1897. Her parents were the civil servant Otto Vīka and Elvīne Vīka (born Blosfelde). The father died when she was seven and she spent a part of her childhood in the countryside outside Dobele, where her mother's parents lived. She moved back to Riga when the mother remarried. Due to her mother's German ancestry, Vīka went to a German girls' school.

During World War I, Vīka served as an assistant nurse, worked as an educator and maid in Russia, Poland and Lithuania, and completed a course in accounting. Back in Riga after the war she worked as a civil servant and a bank clerk until 1935. While working she took art classes at the Tautas augstskola (transl. People's university) in 1920–1922 and studied under the painters Romans Suta (1921–1922), Augusts Zauers (1922–1925) and Uga Skulme (1925–1927).

== Creative works ==
Vīka's paintings were first exhibited in 1927 and she held her first solo exhibition in 1933 at the Riga City Art Museum. In the 1930s and 1940s, she made multi-colour watercolour and oil paintings of scenes from everyday life and dreamy visions, typically with women as central figures. The paintings are stylised and inspired by geometrical ornaments. She followed the conventions of Art Deco, trying to combine restraint, graceful body language, repetition and vitality. She debuted as a poet in a literary calendar in 1924 before her first poetry collection was published in 1932. She published poetry collections, short story collections and novels in the 1930s and 1940s, providing her own illustrations for her books.

From the early 1930s, Latvian mythology was important in Vīka's creative works, a result of her involvement in Latvian neopaganism. After World War II, she adapted to the socialist realism mandated by the Soviet Union. She was expelled from the Artists' Union of the Latvian SSR in 1950 "for remnants of formalism in her oeuvre" but was readmitted in 1957.

== Personal life ==
Vīka had several periods of illness. In 1928 she had a tumor removed which left her unable to have children. In December 1929 she met Viktors Eglītis, a writer 20 years her senior, and they married on 20 December 1930. Like her husband she joined the neopagan Dievturība movement and their wedding was officiated as a Dievturi ritual. She became the stepmother of her husband's sons Anšlavs and Vidvuds; the former became a successful writer in the 1930s and was influenced by her works and personality. Vīka's husband died in a Soviet prison in April 1945, having been arrested while attempting to preserve her paintings.

In the postwar period, Vīka lived in poverty, spending winters painting in Riga and summers in Dobele. Her mother died in 1950 and Anšlavs went into exile, leaving Vidvuds as her only relative in the country. After three years of illness, she died in Riga on 14 February 1963.

== Legacy ==
Lija Brīdaka compiled a collection of Vīka's works, Atmin̦ās, mākslā, rakstniecībā (lit. 'Memories, Art, Writing'), which was published in 1997. There is a street in Dobele named after Vīka. In 2021, the town announced a plan to create a cultural centre in her honour, located near the Dobele art school. More than 90 of her works are in the collection of Dobele's local history museum. To celebrate Vīka's 125th birthday in 2022, Latvijas Pasts released a postage stamp block featuring her and her works as part of its series Outstanding Latvian Artists.

== Publications ==
Bibliography adapted from Literatura.lv.

=== Poetry ===
- Spožie ūdeņi, 1932
- Mēnesnīca, 1935
- Zelta briedis, 1944

=== Prose ===
- Stāsti, 1934
- Atsegtas dvēseles, 1935
- Mūzu vaimanas, 1937
- Lielā slāpe, 1940
- Lielā taisnība, 1942
- Laimīgā dziesma, 1942
- Dievišķā vientiesība, 1944
- Naudas vara, 1944
