= Lāce =

Lāce is a surname. Notable people with the surname include:

- Agnese Lāce (born 1987), Latvian politician
- Anete Lāce (born 2003), Latvian figure skater
- Renāte Lāce (1943–1967), Latvian athlete
