= Ukrainians in Latvia =

Ethnic minority in Latvia

Ukrainians in Latvia (Latvian: Latvijas ukraiņi; Ukrainian: Українці Латвії) are an ethnic minority in Latvia that make up 2.3% of the Latvian population (around 43,000 people).

== History ==
The first known Ukrainian in Latvia was Ivan Malinovsky, a teacher at the Baltic Teachers' Seminar. At the beginning of the 20th century, Ukrainians in Latvia made their first attempts to organize, establishing in January 1911 the "Ukrainian Community" in Riga and in the spring of 1917, the Executive Council of Ukrainians of the 12th Army of the Russian Imperial Army, headquartered in Riga. A Riga branch of the Ukrainian Socialist-Revolutionary Party was also later formed. In January 1933, the "Latvian-Ukrainian Society" was founded in Riga. In 1998, the Ukrainian cultural society "Dnipro", the Ukrainian Youth Club and the Ukrainian Society "Slavutich" of the Balto-Slavic Society were formed. In 2003, the Ukrainian Cultural and Educational Society "Mriya" was founded in Daugavpil. Since the start of Russia's full-scale invasion of kraine in 2022, Latvia has taken many Ukrainian refugees, with more than 30,000 holding temporary protections status as of February 2026.

== Population ==
census year	number
1897	974
1920	1,040
1930	1,629
1935	1,844
1959	29,440
1970	53,641
1979	66,703
1989	92,101
2000	63,558
2011	45,669
2023	67,856

== Notable Ukrainians in Latvia ==
- Aleksandrs Antoņenko
- Kaspars Astašenko
- Ivans Lukjanovs
- Vitālijs Maksimenko
- Fedirs Kuļišs

== See also ==
- Latvia–Ukraine relations
- Russians in Latvia
