= Pētersons =

Surname

Pētersons (feminine: Pētersone) is a surname. Notable people with the name include:

- Aleksandrs Pētersons (born 1980), Icelandic handball player
- Armands Pētersons (born 1990), Latvian footballer
- Ēriks Pētersons (1909–1987), Latvian footballer and hockey player
- Karina Pētersone (born 1954), Latvian politician
- Kārlis Pētersons (1903–1980), Latvian wrestler
- Pēteris Pētersons (1923–1998), Latvian playwright, theatre director and drama critic
- Vineta Pētersone (born 1999), Latvian skier and cyclist
