= Anšlavs Eglītis =

Latvian writer

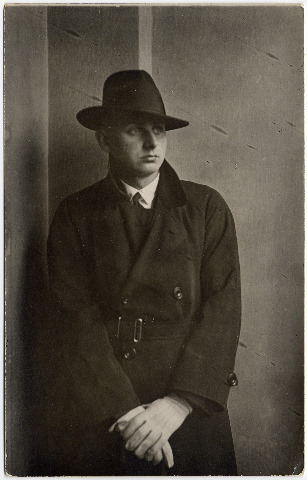
- Born: October 14, 1906; Rīga, Governorate of Livonia, Russian Empire (now Latvia)
- Died: March 4, 1993 (aged 86); Los Angeles, California, U.S.
- Occupations: Writer; novelist; journalist
- Spouse: Veronika Janelsiņa

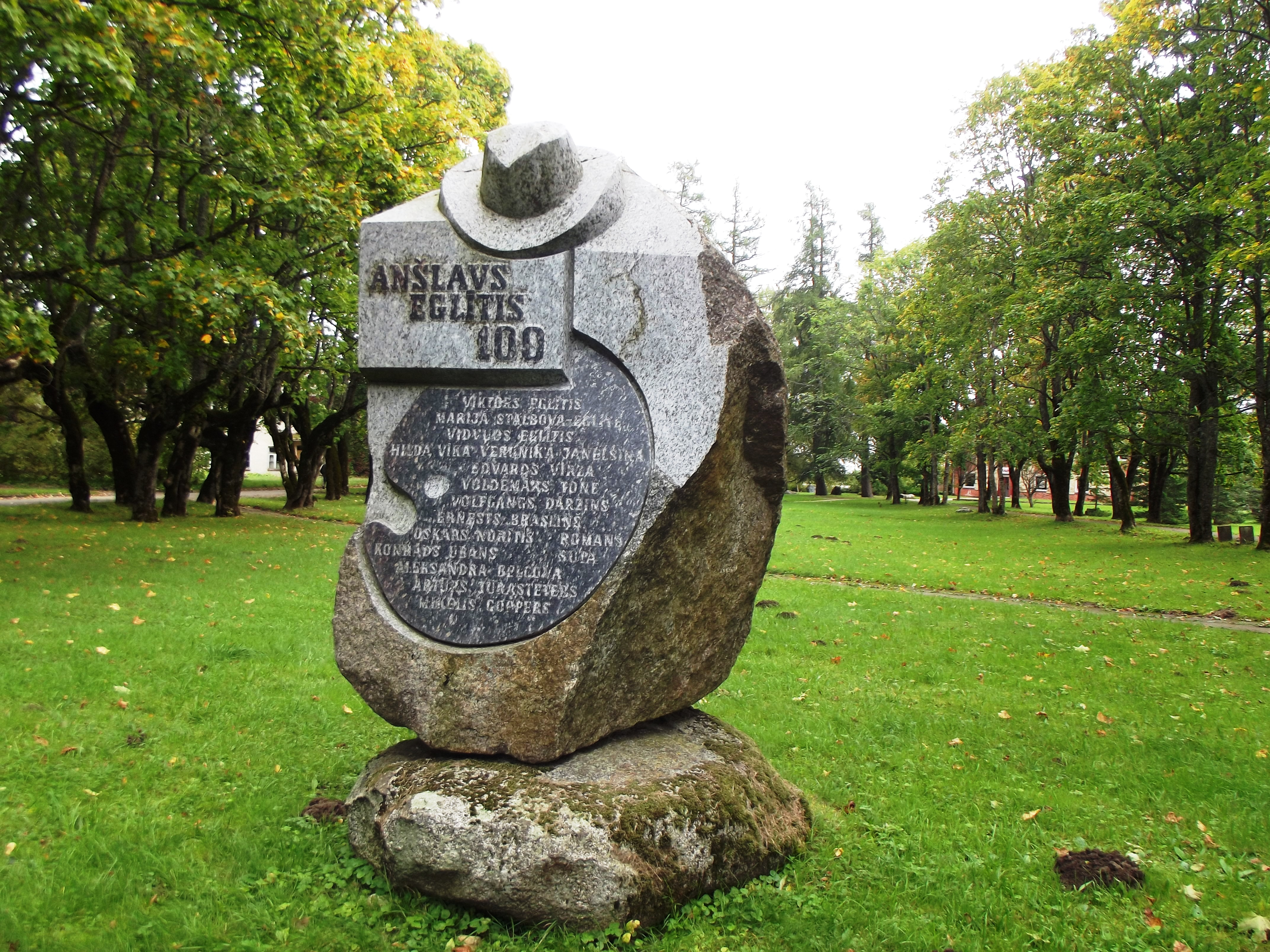
Monument to Anšlavs Eglītis in Inciems.

Anšlavs Eglītis (October 14, 1906 – March 4, 1993) was a Latvian writer, journalist and painter who became a war refugee in 1944. He had a prolific career as a novelist, and his later work often examined aspects of exile life.

== Biography ==
Anšlavs Eglītis was born in Riga, Latvia, the first of two children born to the writer Viktors Eglītis and the teacher and translator Marija Eglīte, née Stalbova. His father was one of the most notable representatives of Decadence in Latvian literature. During the First World War, his family lived in other parts of the Russian Empire, but returned to Latvia in 1918. For a short time they settled in Alūksne. After 1919, his family lived in Riga and Eglītis started his studies in Riga City gymnasium No. 2. He also studied painting in the studio of a Latvian painter Voldemārs Tone at this time.

The family spent all their summer holidays in Inciems cottage, which he later described in his novel Pansija pilī (1962). He caught tuberculosis in 1925. His mother, who suffered pulmonary disease, died in 1926, during his stay in Leysin sanatorium. In 1930, his father remarried the artist and writer Hilda Vīka, whose works and personality came to influence Anšlavs' literature.

He continued his studies in the Art Academy of Latvia and graduated in 1935. After graduation, he worked as a teacher of drawing. In 1936 his first collection of novels, Maestro was published. In 1938 Eglītis started to work as a journalist in the biggest Latvian newspaper Jaunākās ziņas. In 1940, he also collaborated on the magazine Atpūta.

He left Riga for Courland in October 1944 and later fled to Germany, where he settled in Berlin. During the Battle of Berlin his flat was destroyed in an air raid, and Eglītis moved to Switzerland. In 1950, he moved to California, US.

His father, writer Viktors Eglītis, was arrested, tortured and killed in the Cheka building in Riga in 1945. His grave is unknown.

In his American exile, Eglītis wrote more than 50 novels and short stories. Parallel to his literature career he became a theatre and film critic for the Latvian newspaper Laiks published in Brooklyn, New York, which also serialized a number of his novels. In 1957, his Neierasta Amerika began to be serialized in the Soviet Latvian magazine Zvaigzne, but it was immediately qualified as an 'import of bourgeois nationalism' and soon discontinued.

The success of his works resides in their avangardist flavour combined with loyalty to the popular taste. In post-Soviet Latvia, his Shameless Old Men, directed by Mihail Kublinskis, is one of the most successful productions of the National Theater.

He died of cancer in Los Angeles in 1993. In 2006, the Latvian Post issued a commemorative stamp in honor of Eglītis. A monument to the writer was installed in 2008 in Inciems.

In 2018, a movie was made based on the motifs of A. Eglītis novel "Homo Novus", which describes the passion in the life of Riga artists of the late 30s. Created in honor of Latvia 100.

== Sources ==
- Barkan, Elliott Robert (2013). Immigrants in American History: Arrival, Adaptation, and Integration. Greenwood: ABC-CLIO. p. 1931. ISBN 978-1-299-10408-2. OCLC 828140721.
