= Kārlis Ozols-Priednieks =

Latvian poet active in Proletkult

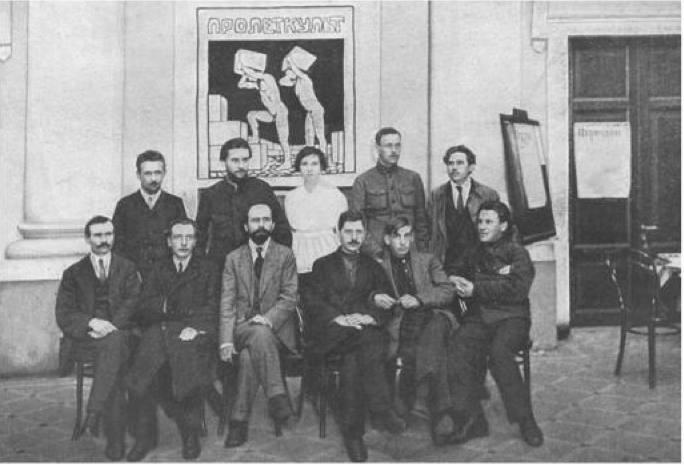
Praesidium of the national Proletkult organisation elected at the first national conference, September 1918. Sitting from left to right: Fedor Kalinin, Vladimir Faidysh, Pavel Lebedev-Polianskii, Aleksei Samobytnik-Mashirov I. I. Nikitin, Vasili Ignatov Standing from left to right: Stefan Krivtsov, Kārlis Ozols-Priednieks, Anna Dodonova, N. M. Vasilevskii, Vladimir Kirillov

Kārlis Ozols-Priednieks (aka Karl Ozol-Prednek, 3 March 1896, Līvbērze–7 July 1943) was a Latvian poet active in Proletkult.

He held a prominent position both in the Proletkult organisation in Petrograd, as well as in the national organisation. In 1918 he advocated that Proletkult membership should be restricted to members of the Russian Communist Party.

He was executed by the Soviet state on 2 February 1938.
