= Irbe =

Female given name

- Gender: Female
- Name day: March 20

Origin
- Meaning: Partridge
- Region of origin: Latvia

Irbe is a Latvian feminine given name and surname. The associated name day is March 20.

Notable people with the surname include:

- Artūrs Irbe (born 1967), Latvian ice hockey player and coach
- Kārlis Irbe (1861–1934), Latvian bishop
- Voldemārs Irbe (1893–1944), Latvian pastelist

== Fictional characters ==
- Gintars Irbe, protagonist of Gintars episode of American sitcom Brooklyn Nine-Nine

== See also ==
- Iribe
