= Inese =

Female given name

- Gender: Female
- Name day: 18 May

Origin
- Origin: variant form of Agnese
- Region of origin: Latvia

Inese is a feminine Latvian feminine given name and may refer to:

- Inese Jaunzeme (1932 – 2011), Latvian athlete
- Inese Galante (born 1954), Latvian soprano opera singer
- Inese Laizāne (born 1971), Latvian politician
- Inese Lībiņa-Egnere (born 1977), Latvian politician
- Inese Šlesere (born 1972), Latvian former model and politician
- Inese Vaidere (born 1952), Latvian politician
