= Production art =

Production art may refer to:

- a form of art, also called productivist art developed principally in Russia, applying art to factory production
- the work carried out by a Production artist
