= Dace (name) =

- Gender: Female

Origin
- Origin: From Dārta, from Doroteja (“Dorothy")
- Region of origin: Latvia

Other names
- Related names: Dārta, Doroteja, Dorothea, Dorothy

Dace is a feminine Latvian given name and may refer to:

- Dace Akmentiņa (1858–1936), Latvian actress
- Dace Melbārde (born 1971), Latvian politician
- Dace Munča, Latvian curler
- Dace Regža (born 1962), Latvian curler and curling coach
- Dace Reinika (born 1958), Latvian politician
- Dace Ruskule (born 1981), Latvian discus thrower
