= Kharino, Gaynsky District, Perm Krai =

Kharino Харино
- Settlement
- Location within Perm Krai Location within Russia
- Coordinates: 60°15′N 54°25′E
- Country: Russia
- Region: Perm Krai
- District: Gaynsky District
- Time zone: UTC+5:00

Kharino (Russian: Харино) is a rural locality (a settlement) in Gaynskoye Rural Settlement, Gaynsky District, Perm Krai, Russia. The population was 823 as of 2010. There are 16 streets.

== Geography ==
Kharino is located 7 km southeast of Gayny (the district's administrative centre) by road. Danilovo is the nearest rural locality.
