= Sarkaņi Parish =

Parish of Latvia

- parish of Latvia
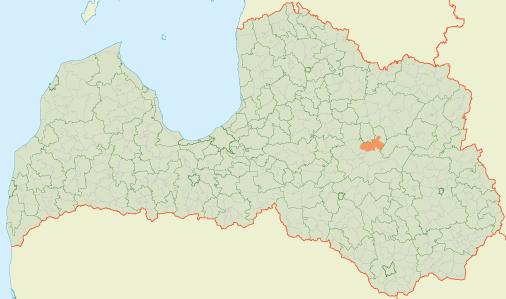
- 56°54′21″N 26°21′27″E
- Country: Latvia

Area
  - Total: 163.97 km^{2} (63.31 sq mi)
  - Land: 163.97 km^{2} (63.31 sq mi)
  - Water: 3.85 km^{2} (1.49 sq mi)

Population (1 January 2025)
  - Total: 1,145
  - Density: 6.983/km^{2} (18.09/sq mi)

Sarkaņi Parish (Latvian: Sarkaņu pagasts) is an administrative unit of Madona Municipality in the Vidzeme region of Latvia.
