= Ozolin =

Origin
- Origin: Latvian
- Meaning: "little oak"

Other names
- Variant form: Ozoliņš

Ozolin (Russian: Озо́лин) is a Russified form of the Latvian language surname Ozoliņš. Notable persons with the surname include:

- Edvin Ozolin (born 1939), Soviet sprinter and coach
- Nikolay Ozolin (1906–2000), Russian pole vaulter
