= Vladimir Kirillov =

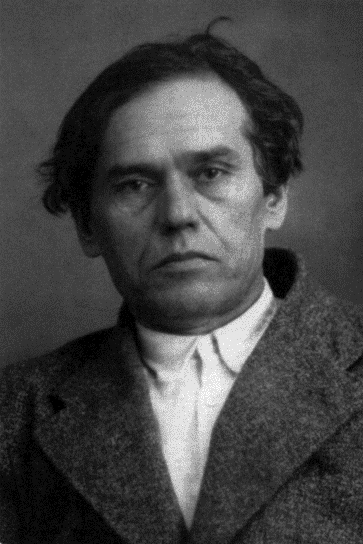
Kirillov in 1937

Vladimir Timofeïevitch Kirillov (Russian: Владимир Тимофеевич Кириллов; 2 October 1889, Kharino, Smolensk Governorate – 16 July 1937, Moscow) was a Russian proletarian poet associated with Proletkult.

Kirillov was born into peasantry and was active in the revolutionary movement from 1904. He was first published in 1913 and mostly wrote for working-class publications. In 1918 he was elected to the national praesidium of Proletkult and also became active in Kuznitsa. He opposed the introduction of the New Economic Policy and left the Russian Communist Party (Bolsheviks) in 1921.

He became one of the victims of the Great Purge and was arrested on January 30, 1937, and later executed on July 16.

He was rehabilitated in 1957.
