= List of Georgian princely families =

This is the alphabetic list of the upper class noble houses of Georgia. They were entitled as tavadi (Georgian: თავადი), roughly translated in English as "prince" and in Russian as "knyaz", a title which was eventually conferred upon most of these families under the Imperial Russian rule (1801–1917).

== A ==
- Abamelik
- Abashidze
- Agiashvili
- Akhvlediani
- Amatuni
- Amilakhvari
- Amirejibi
- Anchabadze
- Andronikashvili
- Apakidze
- Arghutashvili (Mkhargrdzeli-Argutashvili, Argutinsky-Dolgorukov)
- Asatiani
- Asikhmovanov (Osikhmovani)
- Avalishvili

== B ==
- Babadishvili
- Bagrationi-Davitishvili
- Bagration-Mukhraneli
- Baindurashvili
- Baratashvili
- Bebutov (Bebutashvili)
- Begtabegishvili
- Bejanidze
- Beriashvili

== C ==
- Chavchavadze
- Cherkezishvili
- Chichua
- Chijavadze
- Chikovani
- Chiladze
- Chkheidze
- Chkhotua
- Cholokashvili
- Charkviani
- Chkhetiani

== D ==
- Dadiani
- Dadishkeliani
- Devdariani
- Dgebuadze
- Diasamidze
- Dzapsh-Ipa (Zepishvili)
- Dididze
- Dvali

== E ==
- Emukhvari
- Eristavi of Aragvi
- Eristavi of Guria
- Eristavi of Ksani
- Eristavi of Racha

== G ==
- Gardapkhadze
- Gelovani
- Gedevanishvili
- Gobitashvili
- Gochashvili
- Goshadze
- Gruzinsky
- Gugunava
- Guramishvili
- Gurgenidze
- Gurieli
- Gurji-Revazishvili
- Gegechkori
- Gabunia

== I ==
- Iaralishvili
- Iashvili
- Inal-Ipa (Inalishvili)
- Iotamishvili

== J ==
- Jaiani
- Jambakuriani
- Jambakur-Orbeliani
- Jandieri
- Japaridze
- Jaqeli
- Javakhishvili
- Jorjadze

== K ==
- Kavkasidze
- Kashibadze
- Karmazanashvili
- Kherkheulidze
- Khidirbegishvili
- Khimshiashvili
- Khojaminasishvili
- Kobulashvili
- Kochakidze
- Kipiani
- Krawashvili
- Kiknadze

== L ==
- Lazishvili
- Lionidze
- Lortkipanidze

== M ==
- Machabeli
- Machavariani
- Machutadze
- Magalashvili
- Makashvili
- Maksimenishvili
- Mamukashvili
- Manvelishvili
- Marshania
- Melikishvili
- Mikeladze
- Mirimanidze
- Mkhargrdzeli
- Mkheidze

== N ==
- Nakashidze
- Nizharadze
- Nikoladze

== O ==
- Orbeliani

== P ==
- Pagava
- Palavandishvili
- Pavlenishvili
- Peradze

== Q ==
- Qaralashvili

== R ==
- Ratishvili
- Robitashvili
- Rusishvili

== S ==
- Saakadze
- Saginashvili
- Sakvarelidze
- Shalikashvili
- Sharvashidze (Shervashidze)
- Sidamon-Eristavi (Sidamonidze, Sidomonishvili)
- Sologashvili
- Sumbatashvili

== T ==
- Taktakishvili
- Tarkhnishvili (Tarkhan-Mouravi)
- Tavdgiridze
- Tsereteli
- Tsitsishvili (Panaskerteli)
- Tsulukidze
- Tumanishvili
- Turkestanishvili
- Tusishvili

== U ==
- Urjumelashvili

== V ==
- Vachnadze
- Vakhvakhishvili
- Vezirishvili

== Z ==
- Zubalashvili

== See also ==
- List of Georgian surnames
- Nobility of Georgia (country)
