= Machavariani =

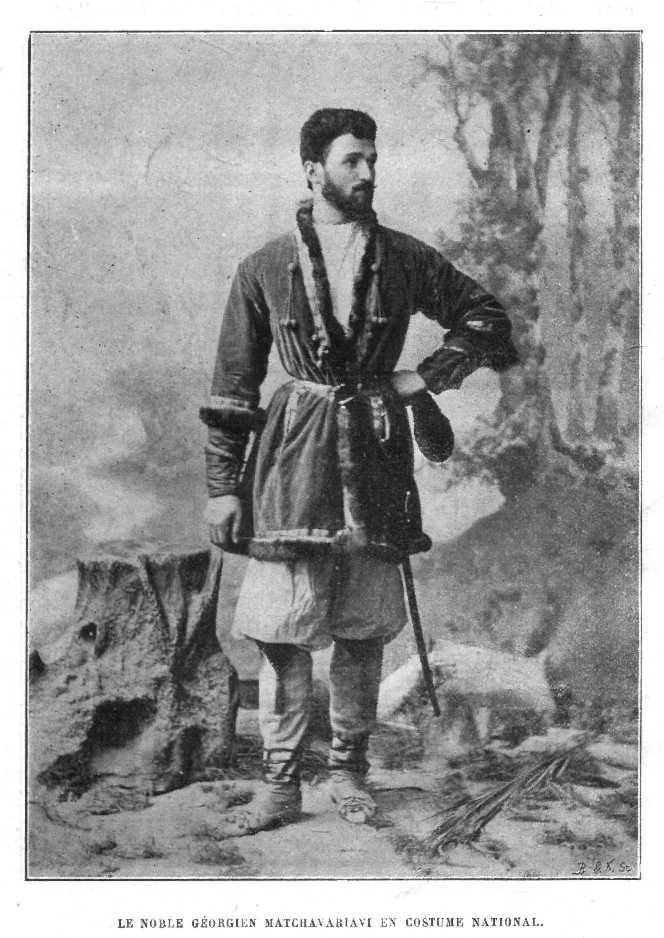
A nobleman from the Machavariani family in the national costume

The Machavariani family (Georgian: მაჭავარიანი) is an old Georgian noble family from the western part of Georgia, Kingdom of Imereti.

== History ==
Originally coming from Svaneti, mountainous region of Georgia, they established themselves in Upper Imereti as a noble family in the regions of Kharagauli, Zestaponi, Chiatura since 1452. Later they spread across Kingdom of Kartli - Shida Kartli and Kvemo Kartli regions. In ancient Georgian feudal hierarchy the Machavariani are mentioned as aznauri or takhtis aznauri of the Georgia royal (tavadi) families - House of Orbeliani, Amirejibi and few others.

After the annexation of Georgia in 1801 by the Russian Empire, the Machavariani were confirmed as part of the Russian nobility in their nobility title (dvoryanstvo) in 1850.

== Notable members ==
- Mikhail Sergeevich Machavariani (1888-1969) Russian pilot, Colonel, Commander of a Caucasian Airforce unit during World War I, awarded The Order of St. George in 1916, highest military decoration in Russian Imperial Army
- David Mikhailovich Machavariani (1886), Colonel, The Commander of the 490th Infantry Rzhevsky Regiment in Russian Imperial Army. Awarded the Order of St. George 4th Class.
- Aleksandr Machavariani (1913–1995), Soviet and Georgian composer and conductor
- Mukhran Machavariani (1929–2010), Soviet and Georgian poet, member of the Supreme Council of the Republic of Georgia in 1990–1992
- Vakhtang Machavariani (1951–2025), Georgian, Russian and Soviet conductor and composer
- Mikheil Machavariani (born 1968), Georgian politician, First Deputy Chairman of the Parliament of Georgia 2004–2008, one of the leaders of 'UNM' political party in Georgia
- Vano Machavariani Deputy Secretary General of the Security Council of Georgia, former Georgian President’s Adviser, first Rep. of Georgia Ambassador to Japan
- Gia Machavariani (born 1985), Georgian Olympic team weightlifter, Europe and World Championships medalist in the 105 kg events
- Mariam "Marie" Kevkhishvili Machavariani (born 1985), Georgian shot putter
- Mamuka Machavariani (born 1970), Soviet and Georgian football player
- Tsotne Machavariani (born 1997), Georgian pistol shooter, competed in 2016 Summer Olympics in Rio
