= Women in Georgia =

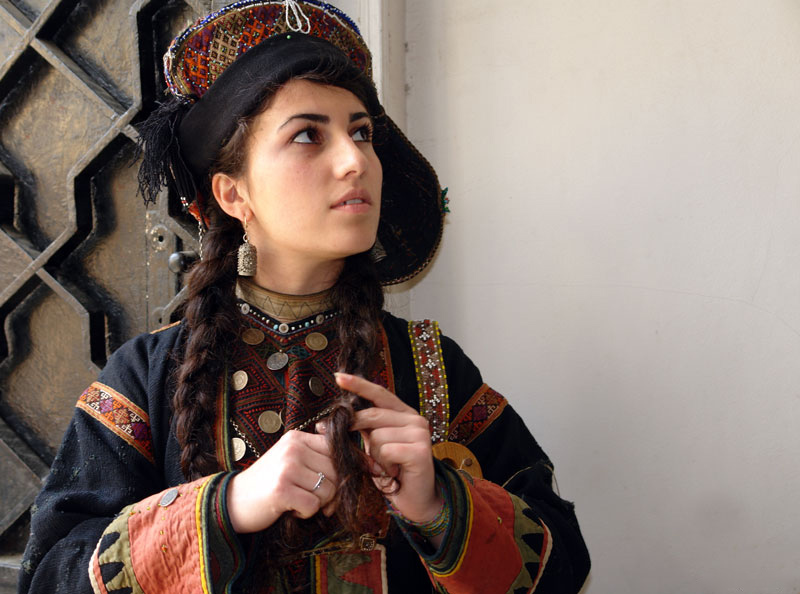
- A Georgian woman wearing a national costume

Gender Inequality Index
- Value: 0.280 (2021)
- Rank: 66th out of 191

Global Gender Gap Index
- Value: 0.731 (2022)
- Rank: 55th out of 146

Women in Georgia live in a society which has been changing over the centuries, where, after decades of Soviet regime, from the 1990s onwards, the culture has seen rapid social changes and new emerging values, but has also been affected by economic instability.

== Historical context ==
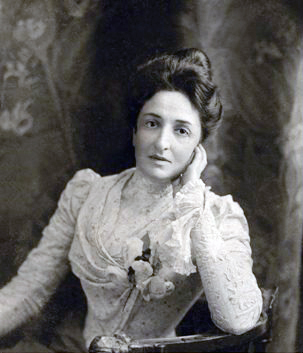
Mariam Jambakur-Orbeliani, 19th century Georgian philanthropist and feminist

On May 26, 1918, the National Council of Georgia unilaterally seceded from the crumbling Russian Empire by passing The Act of Independence of Georgia giving birth to the Democratic Republic of Georgia. According to this act, "the Democratic Republic of Georgia equally guarantees to every citizen within her limits political rights irrespective of nationality, creed, social rank or sex". Accordingly, in 1919, Georgian women were able to vote in the elections of the new Constituent Assembly of Georgia. The election saw fifteen women candidates stand for election, five of whom were elected to the 130-person assembly, all on the Social democratic ticket. The five elected assemblywomen were Ana Sologashvili, Elisabeth Nakashidze-Bolkvadze, Kristine Sharashidze, Eleonora Ter-Parsegova-Makhviladze and Minadora Orjonikidze-Toroshelidze.

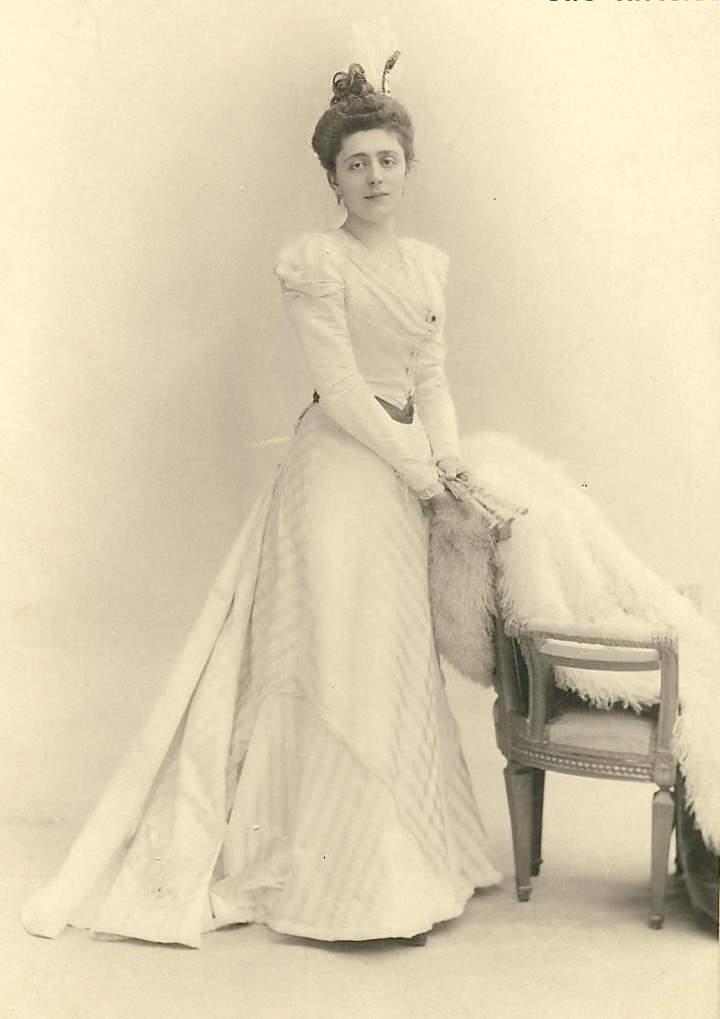
Elizabeth Orbeliani, first woman lecturer and co-founder of Georgia's first university.

In 1921 Georgia was annexed by the Red Army and remained a part of the USSR until its dissolution. In 1991, after the Soviet dissolution, Georgia became an independent country. As with other countries of the former communist bloc, the recovery from a socialist economy to a market economy was hard, and unemployment, economic destabilization, and conflicts have harmed the population, especially in the 1990s. In terms of population, more than 8 out of 10 inhabitants are ethnic Georgians, but there are also minorities such as Azeri, Armenians, Russians, and others. The vast majority of the population is Orthodox Christian, but about one in ten are Muslim. The urbanization of the country is 53.6% (est. 2015). The total fertility rate (TFR) of 1.76 children born/woman (est. 2015) is below the replacement rate. The maternal mortality rate is 36 deaths/100,000 live births (est. 2015).

== Constitutional provisions ==
The Constitution of Georgia states at Article 14 that:

Everyone is free by birth and is equal before law regardless of race, colour, language, religion, political and other opinions, national, ethnic and social belonging, origin, property and title, place of residence.

== Social role of women ==
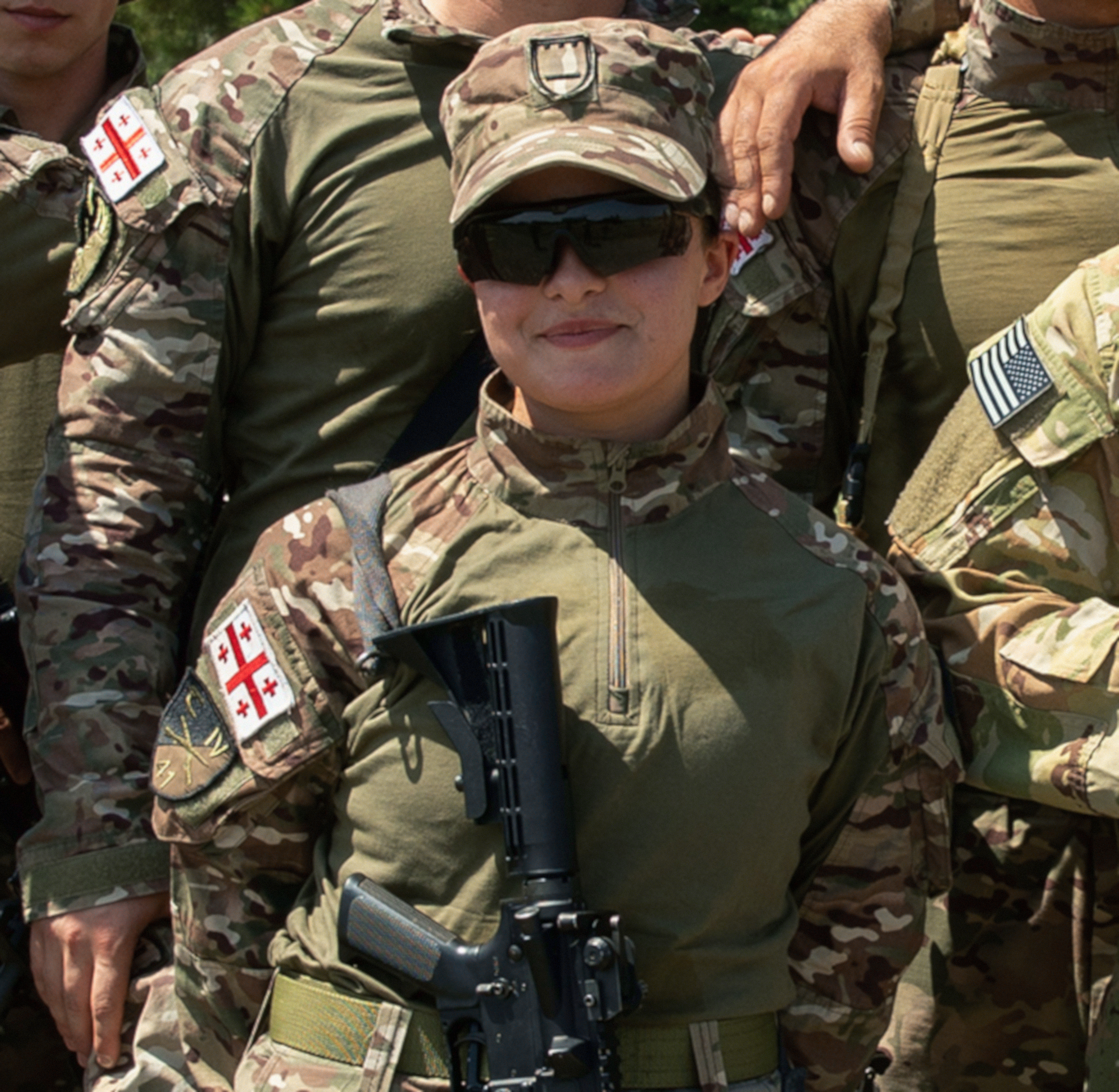
A woman soldier of the Georgian military

Because Georgian culture is a patriarchal one, women are accorded a chivalric form of respect. Women can have the role of both as "breadwinner and housewife". Most of the chores at home are done by women. There is no "explicit division of labor" according to gender, except in so-called "areas of physical labor" (an example is in the field of mining). The statue of Mother of Georgia (Kartlis Deda, or "Mother of Kartli") that stands at a monument in the hills above Tbilisi perhaps best symbolizes such national character: in her left hand she holds a bowl of wine with which she greets her friends and in her right is a sword drawn against her enemies. One of the most important and powerful rulers of Georgia was Queen (king of kings) Tamar the Great. In more recent history Georgian women have been able to acquire various positions in the military including being among the few professional fighter and helicopter pilots of the country's small air force and also a small number in the army's special operations forces. Many women also serve in the field of law enforcement and the government. However, no women are allowed to become priests of the Orthodox church. The so-called "traditional stereotypes of gender-defined social roles" are undergoing changes because of the education being received by new generation of women. Clothing norms stipulate that inside churches, head covering and dress or skirt for women are usually required.

== Employment ==
The Labour Code of Georgia has certain protections for women. Article 2 Labor Relations para. 3 prohibits discrimination based on "race, color, language, ethnic or social origin, nationality, origin, property, birth, place of residence, age, gender, sexual orientation, disability, membership of a religious, social, political or other associations, including the trade unions, by marital status, political or other opinion". Art. 27 grants maternity leave, and Art 36 and Art 37 in general (and explicitly at sections Art 36(2)g together with Art 37(3)c) protect women from dismissal due to maternity, childbirth and child care, leave for a newborn child adoption and additional leave for child care. The Law of Georgia on Gender Equality provides additional protections.

== Legislation ==
=== Domestic violence and human trafficking ===
In 2006, Georgia enacted Law of Georgia on Elimination of Domestic Violence, Protection and Support of Victims of Domestic Violence. Georgia also ratified the Council of Europe Convention on Action against Trafficking in Human Beings in 2007.

=== Legal reforms ===
Georgian authorities started preparing to ratify the Istanbul Convention in August 2015, and the UN Special Rapporteur on Violence Against Women visited Georgia in February 2016, following the X and Y v. Georgia case filed under the United Nations Convention on the Elimination of All Forms of Discrimination Against Women (CEDAW), the first case from the South Caucasus decided by CEDAW. The X and Y v. Georgia case, filed by the non-governmental organizations (NGOs) Interight, Rights Georgia (called at the time Article 42 of the Constitution), and the European Human Rights Advocacy Centre (EHRAC), concerned sexual violence against a mother X and her daughter Y, starting in 1987. RG and Interights initially represented X and Y at the European Court of Human Rights, which found the case inadmissible, and then submitted the case to the CEDAW committee, focussing on "sex-based discrimination inherent in the authorities' failure to prevent the violence suffered by the applicants". The CEDAW committee found the case admissible in 2013. The EHRAC together with RG continued representing X and Y from May 2014. In 2015, the committee found Georgia guilty of not enacting criminal law to protect women and girls from sexual violence, and issued legislative and training recommendations to the Georgian government. The finding was the first CEDAW committee finding against Georgia. Georgia ratified the Istanbul Convention on 19 May 2017 and the convention entered into force in Georgia on 1 September 2017.

== See also ==
- Women in Europe
- Women in Asia
