= Sologashvili =

Georgian noble family

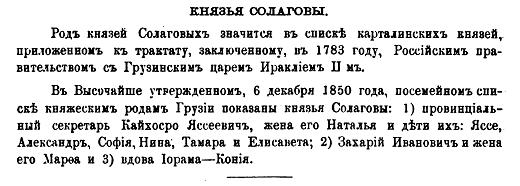
Register of Princes Solagov in the Russian nobility book from 1891

The House of Sologashvili (Georgian: სოლოღაშვილი), also known as Solagashvili (სოლაღაშვილი) or Salagashvili (სალაღაშვილი), is an old Georgian noble family, known from the 15th century. They were related to the House of Baratashvili and possibly shared a common origin with them from the House of Kachibadze (ქაჩიბაძე), which were possibly related to the Liparitids-Orbeli.

== History ==
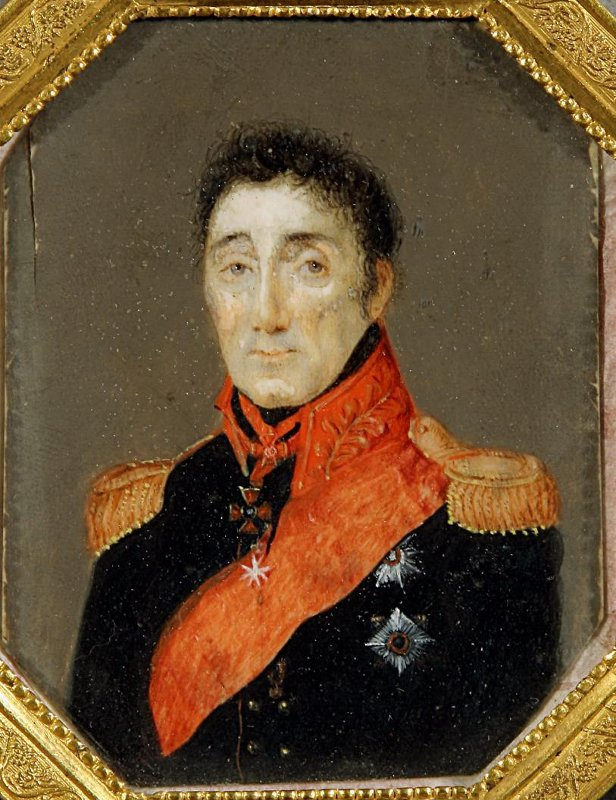
Portrait of Prince Semyon Ivanovich Salagov (1756-1820)

The family came from the southern Georgian province of Samtskhe, which they left for Kartli in the 15th century. The kings of Kartli granted them the dignity of Tavadi ("prince") and estates in the valleys of Algeti and Vere as well as in the environs of Tbilisi. The Sologashvili owned the fortresses of Kojori and Ch'apala, and the monastery of Kabeni, their familial burial ground. A branch emigrated, in 1724, to the Russian Empire, where they came to be known as Salagov (Салаговы). A member of this branch was General Semyon Ivanovich Salagov (1754–1820). The Georgian Sologashvili were assimilated into the Russian nobility and confirmed as princes (knyaz) of the Russian Empire in 1850.

== Notable members ==
- Anna Sologashvili (1882–1937), a Social-Democratic politician
