= Kristine Sharashidze =

Georgian politician

- ქრისტინე შარაშიძე (Georgian)
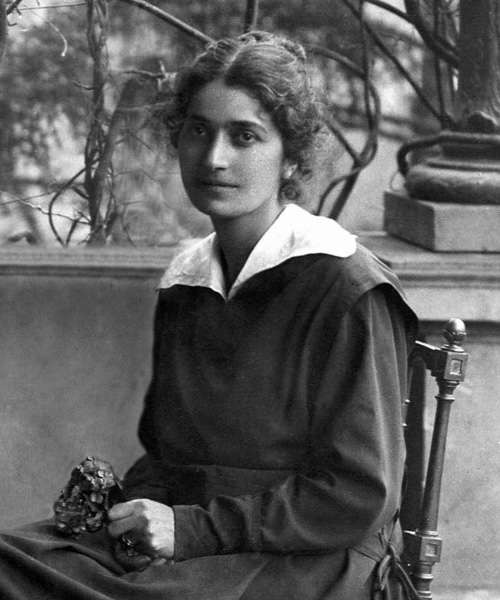

Personal details
- Born: 1889 Bakhvi, Kutais Governorate, Russian Empire
- Died: 1973 (aged 83–84) Tbilisi, Georgian SSR, USSR
- Party: Social Democratic Party of Georgia (Georgian Mensheviks)

Kristine Sharashidze (Georgian: ქრისტინე შარაშიძე; August 2, 1887 — 1973) was a Georgian politician, active in the Democratic Republic of Georgia and its Constituent Assembly.

== Biography ==
Kristine Sharashidze was born on August 2, 1887 in the village of Bakhvi. Her parents were Nina Kikodze and Gigo Sharashidze. She studied at school of village Bakhvi and then at St. Nino Women's Gymnasium in Kutaisi. In 1904 she became an organizer of pupils revolutionary movement.

She worked as a journalist and teacher. She was a member of the anti-Soviet movement and was repeatedly arrested. Kristine was one of the first women, who became member of the Constituent Assembly in 1919 (together with Eleonora Ter-Parsegova-Makhviladze, Minadora Toroshelidze, Liza Bolkvadze and Anna Sologashvili).
