= Peter Shalikov =

Peter Ivanovich Shalikov
- Пётр Иванович Шаликов
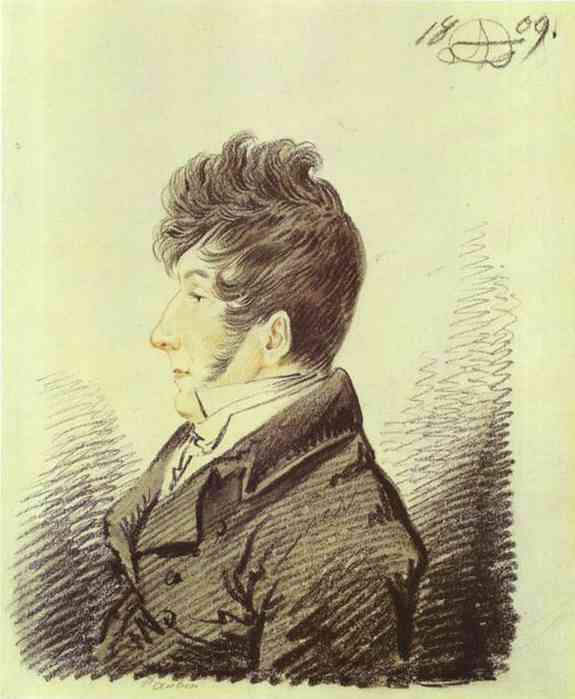
- Born: 1768
- Died: February 28, 1852 (aged 83–84); Moscow Governorate, Russian Empire
- Occupations: Journalist, author, poet
- Writing career
- Language: Russian

Prince Peter Ivanovich Shalikov (? – February 28, 1852, Serpukhov District of Moscow Governorate) was a Russian sentimentalist writer, journalist and publisher.

== Biography ==
The offspring of the Georgian princely family Shalikashvili. Born in the family of a cavalry officer. Received home education. He studied at the Noble Hostel at Moscow University. He entered the service in one of the cavalry regiments. He participated in the assault on Ochakov, then – in the Polish War. In 1797 he was prime major, squadron commander. After 8 years of officer service, he left military service (1799), settled in Moscow and indulged in literary pursuits.

During the Patriotic War of 1812, he could not leave Moscow, survived the French occupation in his house on Presnya, in 1813 he published memories of the French staying in Moscow: "Historical News of the French Staying in Moscow in 1812".

He was a member of the Moscow Masonic lodge "Alexander of Threefold Salvation", working under the Revised Scottish Charter.

He died on his estate in the Serpukhov District of Moscow Province. He was buried at the Vysotsky Cemetery in Serpukhov.

== Literary activity ==
He began to print in 1796 in the journal "Pleasant and Useful Forwarding of Time". He published collections of poems "The Fruit of Free Feelings" (parts 1–3, 1798–1801), "Flowers of Graces" (1802).

Under the influence of Karamzin's "Letters of a Russian Traveler" he wrote prose works "Journey to Little Russia" (parts 1–2, 1803–1804) and "Journey to Kronstadt" (1805). In 1819, "The Tales of Prince Shalikov" and "Collected Works" (part 1–2) were published. As a prose writer, he is ranked among the epigones of sentimentalism.

He was the publisher of the magazines "Moscow Spectator" (1806), "Aglaia" (1808–1812), and "Ladies' Magazine" (1823–1833). He was also the editor of the newspaper "Moskovskiye Vedomosti".

== Family ==
His sister and collaborator Alexandra (died 1862) was a poet and translator.

On July 9, 1813, in Moscow, Prince Peter Ivanovich married Alexander Fedorovna Leisnau (or Leisen), daughter of the major Georgievsky Internal Battalion, Franz Khristianovich Leisnau (Leisen). Prince Peter Vyazemsky wrote to Alexander Turgenev: "Do you know that Shalikov married a German woman, who smokes a pipe, drinking watered beer, and that with great difficulty, and only in the second week, could – his lordship".

Children:

- Natalia (1815–1878) – writer, first woman journalist in Russia;
- Gregory (1818–1872) – served in the Lublin Jaeger Regiment (1839), lieutenant colonel (1864); retired colonel;
- Andrei (1823–1896) – Vasily Pushkin's godson, studied at the Moscow Cadet Corps, retired cavalry lieutenant (1864), State Adviser;
- Sophia (August 2, 1832 – 1913) – the wife of Mikhail Katkov.

== Sources ==
- Peter Ivanovich Shalikov // Russian Biographical Dictionary: in 25 Volumes – Saint Petersburg, 1905 – Volume 22: Chaadaev – Shvitkov – Pages 492–496
- Peter Ivanovich Shalikov // Brockhaus and Efron Encyclopedic Dictionary: in 86 Volumes (82 Volumes and 4 Additional) – Saint Petersburg, 1890–1907
- Peter Shalikov (1813). The Historical News of the French Stay in Moscow in 1812. Moscow. p. 64.
- Russian Sentimental Story. Compilation, General Wording, Introductory Article and Comments by Pavel Orlov – Moscow, 1979
