= Ratishvili =

Georgian noble family

Coat of arms of Princes Ratishvili

The House of Ratishvili (Georgian: რატიშვილი) are a Georgian noble family. They had the status of prince (tavadi) in the kingdom of Kartli and they were confirmed in their rank in the Russian Empire as princes (knyaz) Ratiev (Russian: Ратиев, Ratiyev) in 1825.

== Origin ==
According to the list of Georgian noble families compiled by Prince Ioane of Georgia in the early 19th century, the Ratishvili sprang off the ducal dynasty (eristavi) of Ksani. This view was further developed by the modern genealogist Cyril Toumanoff, who identified Rati Tsirkvaleli Glonis-Tavadze, the prothonotary of Georgia (1458/68) and a son of Duke Kvenipnevel II of Ksani, as the forefather of the Ratishvili. An alternative hypothesis makes the Ratishvili a branch of the Baratashvili-Orbeliani dynasty; yet another has it that both these genealogies are correct and there were, in fact, two Ratishvili families of different origin.

== History ==
The first documented mention of the Ratishvili, in the person of Kaikhosro and his sons—Jesse, Bezhan, and Zurab—as princes occurs in the 1688 charter of Prince Royal Bagrat. A branch of the family was established in Russia in 1724 with the emigration of Prince Zurab Ratishvili (Igor Ratiev) in the suite of King Vakhtang VI. Those remaining in Georgia had their estate in Ksovrisi near the ancient capital of Mtskheta and were listed among the princes of Kartli in a document attached to the Russo–Georgian treaty of Georgievsk in 1783. After the Russian annexation of Georgia, the family was accepted among the princely nobility of the Russian Empire in 1825, with their members confirmed in a series of decrees from 1849 to 1858.

The Ratishvili had no officially confirmed coat of arms, but two versions of it are known, one found in Tsikhinsky's unpublished catalogue The Caucasian Armorial (1922), and the other given by Mikhail Vadbolsky in his book on the Georgian heraldry (1980).

== See also ==
- Ivan Ratiev
