= Gurgenidze =

Gurgenidze (Georgian: გურგენიძე) is a Georgian surname and may refer to:

- Gurgenidze (noble family), princely family in Georgia
- Bukhuti Gurgenidze (1933—2008), Georgian chess grandmaster
- Lado Gurgenidze (born 1970), former Prime Minister of Georgia
- Revaz Gurgenidze (born 1986), Russian acrobatic gymnast
- Inga Gurgenidze (born 2009), Georgian figure skater
