= Babadishvili =

Georgian noble family

Coat of arms of the Georgian Princes Babadishvili, 1783

The House of Babadishvili (Georgian: ბაბადიშვილი; also Babadishi, ბაბადიში) is a Georgian noble family claimed to have sprung off the royal Bagrationi dynasty of Kakheti in the 17th century.

== History ==
Prince Ioane of Georgia (1768–1830) reports that the Babadishvili descend from the Kakhetian ruler David II of Kakheti (Imam Quli Khan; 1678–1722), “corrected” by some modern genealogists to Joseph, a supposed grandson of King Teimuraz I (1589–1663). Professor Cyril Toumanoff considers the family to be related to the Beburishvili (ბებურიშვილი), possible descendants of the medieval House of Donauri.

== Titles ==
The family were entitled as the princes (tavadi) of the third rank in Georgia, and later incorporated into the Russian nobility and confirmed the title of Knyaz of the Russian Empire in 1850.

== See also ==
Bagration-babadish's Noble branch

Teimuraz I (1589–1663); King of Kakheti; 1606–1616; 1634–1648; King of Kartli-Kakheti; 1625-1633
Prince David (1612–1648)	Ioseb (Roseb) (~1635-1648)
Heraclius I (1642–1709); King of Kartli; 1688–1703; King of Kakheti; 1703-1709	Giorgi (~1660-1690)	Kumsa (~1670-1690)
Teimuraz II (1695–1762); King of Kakheti; 1732–1744; King of Kartli; 1744-1762	Ioseb (?–1740) ×	Rostom (~1715-1750)
United Kingdom of Kartli-Kakheti	Giorgi (~1753-1780)
Glakha (~1755-1804)	Zakaria (~1760-?)	Roseb (~1773-1821) ×	saphat (~1801) ×	pharan (~1801-1809) ×
Roseb (1790-1828)	Iosaphat (1791-1820) ×	Aleksandre (1801-1821) ×	Bagrat (1804-1829) ×	Simon (1795-?) ×
Giorgi (1817-1875)
Mikheil (1856-?)	Mariam (1867-?)
Ana (1898-1978) ×	Giorgi (1899-1975)	Nikoloz (1905-1989)
Elisabed (b.1928)	Mikheil (b.1930)	Thamar (b.1936)	Leila (b.1936)	Lali (1939-2006)	Ketevan (b.1950)
Andrey (1957-1993)	Irine (b.1977)
Natalia (b.1985)
