= Gaioz =

Gaioz (Georgian: გაიოზ) is a given name, a variant of Gaius. It may refer to:

- Gaioz Devdariani (1901–1938) Georgian revolutionary and Soviet politician
- Gaioz Jejelava (1914–2005), Georgian and Soviet football player
- Gaioz Nigalidze (born 1989), Georgian chess player.
