= Rusishvili =

Surname

The House of Rusishvili (Georgian: რუსიშვილი) is a historic Georgian noble family.

== History ==
The Rusishvili were a princely family, tavadi, in the eastern Georgian kingdom of Kakheti. A genealogical tradition enshrined in the writings of Prince Ioane of Georgia (1768–1830) traces the family's ancestry to the late 12th century, making them descended from a Rus guardsman of Prince Yuri of Novgorod, the first husband of Queen Regnant Tamar of Georgia. Yuri's guardsman is said to have stayed in Georgia and ennobled by Tamar. His progeny allegedly adopted the surname of Rusishvili, literally "children or scions of the Rus". The family is included in the list of the Georgian nobility attached to the Russo-Georgian treaty of Georgievsk of 1783. Members of the family occupied the office of Chief Treasurer at the court of the kings of Kakheti and, since 1724, the episcopal sea of Nekresi. After the Russian annexation of Georgia, the family was confirmed among the princely nobility (knyaz) of the Russian Empire in 1850. The surname was Russified as Rusiyev (Русиев).

The Robitashvili had no officially confirmed coat of arms, but a drawing of the familial arms is included in Tsikhinsky's unpublished Russian-language catalogue The Caucasian Armorial, dated to 1922.
