= Devdariani =

Devdariani is a surname. Notable people with the surname include:

- Gaioz Devdariani (1901–1938), Georgian revolutionary
- David Devdariani (1927–2006), Georgian law professor
- Davit Devdariani (born 1987), Georgian footballer
- Seit Devdariani (1879–1937), Georgian philosopher
