= Begtabegishvili =

Georgian noble family

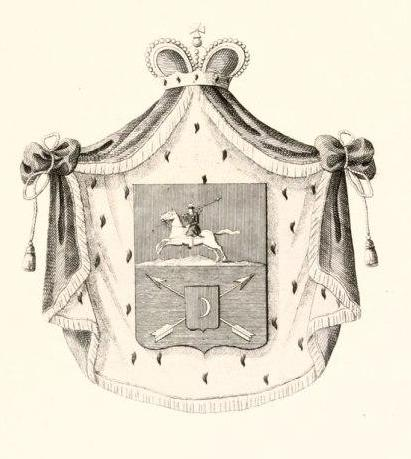
The coat of arms of the House of Begtabegishvili, later became incorporated into the Russian nobility, thus becoming Princes Bektabekov

The House of Begtabegishvili (Georgian: ბეგთაბეგიშვილი), Begtabegov or Bektabekov (Georgian: ბეგთაბეგოვი, Russian: Бегтабеговы, Бектабековы) was a Georgian noble family of Armenian origin.

== History ==
The ancestors of the family fled the Muslim conquest of Armenia and moved to Georgia in the seventeenth century. They were originally known as Shanshean-Martirozashvili (შანშეიან-მარტიროზაშვილი), and possibly also as T’aniashvili (თანიაშვილი). The Kartli-Kakhetian King Teimuraz I elevated the family to a princely dignity (tavadi), reportedly in 1633, and granted its head the hereditary office of mdivan-begi, i.e., royal secretary, whence the dynastic name adopted by the family.

The early 17th-century head of the house, Begtabeg, was a notable copyist who created one of the best manuscripts of the medieval Georgian epic The Knight in the Panther's Skin by Shota Rustaveli (Manuscript H-54, Georgian National Center of Manuscripts).

The Begtabegishvili were listed among the Georgian nobility in a special document attached to the Russo-Georgian Treaty of Georgievsk of 1783. They were the grandees of the second class under the Princes Baratashvili. After the Russian annexation of Georgia, the family was confirmed in the princely rank (knyaz) by the Tsar’s degrees of February 25, 1826 and December 6, 1850. Their official title was "Bagtabegov, Princes of Georgia" with a corresponding coat of arms (pictured). The best known 19th-century members of this family were the major general Solomon Begtabegov (died May 6, 1860) and Alexander Begtabegov (1819-1876), participants of the Caucasian War.
