= Rebellion in Guria (1841) =

Conflict in the former Georgian principality of Guria

- Map of Guria under the Russian Empire
Date	May–September 1841
Location	Guria, Russian Empire
Result	Russian victory: Some concessions made to the peasantry

Belligerents
Russian Empire	Gurian rebels

Commanders and leaders
(Russian Empire) Colonel Moisey Argutinsky-Dolgorukov (Russian Empire) David Dadiani	Abes Bolkvadze †; David Gugunava; Ambako Shalikashvili (POW)

Strength
Around 3,000	Around 7,000

Casualties and losses
At least 32 killed, 115 wounded, 17 POW	100+ killed, wounded, Prisoners of war

The Rebellion in Guria (1841) (Georgian: გურიის აჯანყება, romanized: guriis ajanq'eba; Russian: Мятеж в Гурии, myatezh v Gurii) was a conflict in the former Georgian principality of Guria, at that time part of the Georgia-Imeretia Governorate of the Russian Empire, that took place as a reaction to the government's newly introduced duties and taxes for the Georgian peasants. The rebels, joined by several nobles, were initially successful in overrunning much of Guria, but they were finally defeated by the Imperial Russian Army and the allied Georgian nobility in September 1841.

== Background ==
Guria, a small and poor Georgian rural province on the Black Sea, had been under the Russian hegemony since 1810. In 1829, the Russians eliminated the local autonomous princely rule and imposed a Russian administration. The province had already been a scene of anti-Russian insurrection in 1820 and would gain more notability with a popular Social-Democratic uprising in 1905.

== Rebellion ==
In 1841, without regard to local conditions, the Russian government ordered Gurian peasants to cultivate potatoes and to pay their taxes in Russian cash. Guria still maintained a primarily natural economy based on corn and millet. Rumors began to spread among the peasants that money payments would soon be required and that peasants would be drafted into the army.

When the tax collections began in May 1841, the peasants of the Lanchkhuti community resisted and took to arms on May 22, 1841. The disturbances spread through all Guria and soon the rebels had almost 7,200 men in their ranks. They took control of most fortified points in the province and blocked roads leading to the city of Kutaisi. On August 9, 1841, the insurgents headed by Abes Bolkvadze clashed with the Russian troops of Colonel Brusilov at Gogoreti, inflicted heavy casualties upon them and forced Brusilov to retreat. Twice that month the Gurians tried but failed to take Ozurgeti, the principal town of Guria and the last remaining outpost of the Russians. Dissension within the rebel ranks led to the defection of many noble allies, most importantly of Prince David Gugunava. Eventually, on September 5, some 2,500 regular Russian troops under Colonel Moisey Argutinsky-Dolgorukov—aided by the volunteer units provided by the pro-Russian nobles—attacked the rebels and defeated them, killing more than 60. By late September Guria was again calm and under the Russian control, but the government made no further effort to collect taxes in cash or cultivate potatoes. By 1842, most arrested rebel leaders were released, except Prince Ambako Shalikashvili, who was banished to Siberia. According to a Russian source published in 1901, the Russian losses in the rebellion were at least 32 killed, 115 wounded, and 17 captured.

The rebellion was described by the peasant writer Egnate Ninoshvili (1859–1894) in his historical novel, The Revolt in Guria (Georgian: ჯანყი გურიაში), which was screened by the pioneering Georgian film director Alexander Tsutsunava in 1928.
