= Shalikashvili =

Coat of arms of Princes Shalikashvili

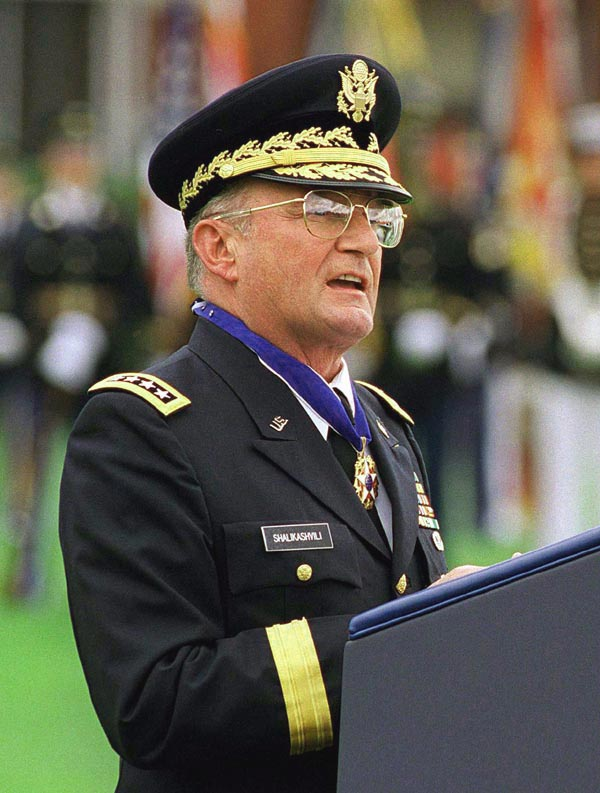
Gen. John M. Shalikashvili at his farewell ceremony on Sept. 30, 1997.

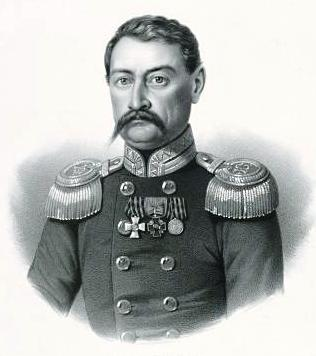
Ivan Osipovich Shalikov, Maior

The House of Shalikashvili (Georgian: შალიკაშვილი, IPA: [ʃalikʼaʃʷili]) is a Georgian noble family, originally from Samtskhe in southwest Georgia. With several notable members from the 16th century to the 20th, their descendants have survived in the United States (Gen. John Shalikashvili) and Georgia.

== History ==
The family, earlier known as Roch’ikashvili (როჭიკაშვილი), originated in the province of Samtskhe and had a fiefdom centered at the castle of T’mogvi. Remotely related to the local princely dynasty of Jaqeli, the Shalikashvili were both their most faithful allies and most dangerous rivals at different times. In the 16th century, the family, in the person of Ot'ar Shalikashvili, was instrumental in restoring the Jaqeli dynasty to the principate of Samtskhe of which they had been dispossessed by the western Georgian kings of Imereti from 1535 to 1547. Subsequently, the Jaqeli went on to curb the influence of the Shalikashvili, who responded with a revolt. By 1578, the family had been coerced to flee Samtskhe to Kartli in central Georgia, where they were recognized as princes (tavadi; confirmed under Russian rule, 1826) and maintained themselves into the 20th century. The 1921 Sovietization of Georgia and the ensuing crackdown on nobility forced the principal members of the family to relocate to Poland whence they removed to the United States in the wake of World War II. John Malchase Shalikashvili (1936–2011), who served as Chairman of the Joint Chiefs of Staff 1993–1997, was a descendant of this line.

Another branch of the Shalikashvili, now extinct in a male line, removed to Russia, following the Georgian king Vakhtang VI into his exile in 1724. They came to be known as Princes Shalikov (Russian: Шаликов) and had estates in the Moscow Governorate. A notable member of this family was the writer Pyotr Shalikov (1768–1852) whose daughter Sofia carried the Shalikov titles into the family of her husband, an influential journalist Mikhail Katkov (1818–1887).
