= Nizharadze =

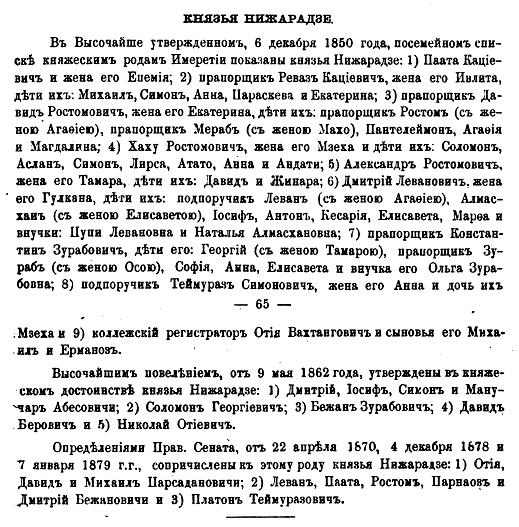
Princes Nizharadze in the Russian nobility book from 1892

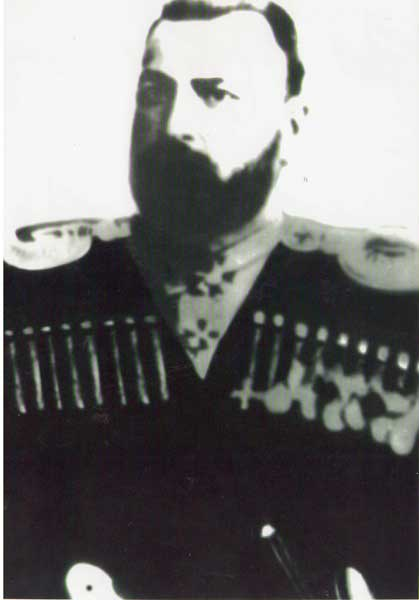
Prince David Nizharadze (1853–1922)

The House of Nizharadze (Georgian: ნიჟარაძე) is a Georgian noble family, known from the late 13th century. They had a status of tavadi (prince) in the western Georgian kingdom of Imereti and were confirmed in the rank of knyaz of the Russian Empire, in 1850 and 1862, after the Russian annexation of Imereti.

== History ==
A family legend of the Nizharadze, written down in the genealogical work by Prince Ioane of Georgia early in the 19th century, traces the family's origin to the Persian Nizhad who settled down in Imereti, his descendants being named Nizharadze, “the son of Nizhad”, after him. Popular memory has preserved another legend, according to which, the Nizharadze stem of the three brothers from the mountainous western Georgian province of Svaneti, two of whom had moved to Imereti and Adjara. In the kingdom of Imereti, they attained to a princely status and held the hereditary office of Great Pantiers of Imereti. By the mid-18th century, their fiefdom encompassed several villages west of the Imeretian capital of Kutaisi. These were Maghlaki, Kveda Okoni, Zeda Okoni, Opshkviti, Sakulia, Chkvishi, Namashevi, Mitsatsiteli and part of Ternali. The Nizharadze played a prominent role in the regional politics under the last kings of Imereti. Prince Rostom Nizharadze was a son-in-law of King Solomon II of Imereti and followed him into struggle for independence against the Russians in 1810 and ultimately in his Turkish exile. He even petitioned to the Emperor of the French Napoleon I, fruitlessly requesting aid for Solomon.

The Nizharadze were received among the princely nobility of the Russian Empire by the imperial decrees of 1850 and 1862. Many of these nobles served in the Imperial Army of Russia. Prince David Nizharadze (1853–1922) attained to a rank of general of the Russian army during World War I.
