= Azadan =

Class of Iranian nobles

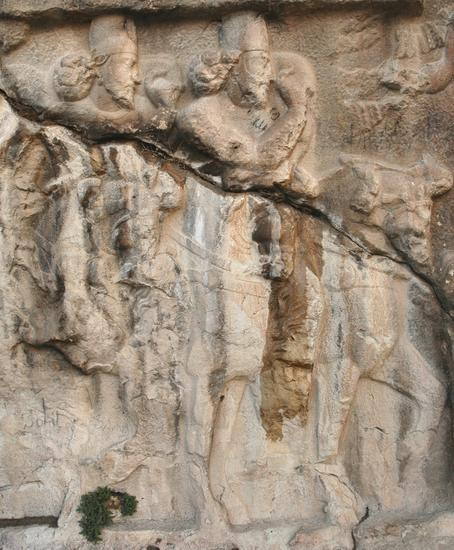
Sasanian-era rock relief in Bishapur depicting cavalrymen, who were generally drawn from the ranks of the azadan and wuzurgan

The Azadan (Middle Persian: āzādān, Parthian: āzātān; meaning 'free' and 'noble') were a class of Iranian nobles. They are probably identical to the eleutheroi ('the free ones') mentioned in Greek sources to refer to a group of Parthian nobles. According to the 1st-century Romano-Jewish historian Josephus (died 100 AD), the Parthian army led by prince Pacorus I during the invasion of Judea consisted of members of the eleutheroi. The Kingdom of Armenia adopted the same hierarchy as that of the Parthians, which included the azadan class (azat), which was used to label the Armenian middle and lower nobility. The name of the Georgian nobility, Aznauri, also corresponded to that of azadan. A class of azadan are also attested in Sogdia, an Iranian civilization located in Central Asia.

The Sasanians, who supplanted the Parthians in 224, maintained the same divisions of the nobility as their predecessor. Under the Sasanians, the azadan were members of the lower nobility and the last class-rank of the four types of the Sasanian nobility. The four ranks consisted of the shahrdaran (vassal kings and dynasts), the wispuhran (princes of royal blood), the wuzurgan (grandees) and the azadan (lower nobility). The azadan and wuzurgan formed the bulk of the cavalry (aswaran), which in turn formed the backbone of the Sasanian army. The azadan were analogous to the knights of Medieval Europe.

The azadan are first attested in the bilingual Hajjiabad inscription of the King of Kings (shahanshah) Shapur I (r. 240–270):

This is the range of the arrow shot by Us, the Mazda-worshipping god Shapur, the king of kings of Eran and Aneran, whose origin is from the gods, the son of the Mazda-worshipping god Ardashir, the king of kings of Eran, whose origin is from the gods, the grandson of the god Pabag, the king. And when we shot this arrow, we were shooting before the kings [landholders; shahrdaran], the princes [wispuhran], the grandees [wuzurgan] and the nobles [azadan].

They are later mentioned in the Paikuli inscription of 293, erected by Shapur I's grandson Narseh (r. 271–293), who mentions the azadan along with other groups of the nobility. They are likewise mentioned in the inscription of Shapur II (r. 309–379) at Meshkinshahr. According to the 5th-century Byzantine Armenian historian Faustus of Byzantium, the azadan formed the bulk of Shapur II's royal bodyguard regiment.

== Sources ==
- Chkeidze, Thea (2001). "Georgia v. Linguistic contacts with Iranian languages". In Yarshater, Ehsan (ed.). Encyclopædia Iranica. Vol. X/5: Geography IV–Germany VI. London and New York: Routledge & Kegan Paul. pp. 486–490. ISBN 978-0-933273-53-5.
- Daryaee, Touraj (2014). Sasanian Persia: The Rise and Fall of an Empire. I.B.Tauris. pp. 1–240. ISBN 978-0857716668.
- McDonough, Scott (2013). "Military and Society in Sasanian Iran". In Campbell, Brian; Tritle, Lawrence A. (eds.). The Oxford Handbook of Warfare in the Classical World. Oxford University Press. pp. 1–783. ISBN 9780195304657.
- Romeny, R. B. ter Haar (2010). Religious Origins of Nations?: The Christian Communities of the Middle East. Brill. ISBN 9789004173750.
- Shaki, Mansour (1991). "Class System iii. In the Parthian and Sasanian Periods". In Yarshater, Ehsan (ed.). Encyclopædia Iranica. Vol. V/6: C̆ihrdād Nask–Class system V. London and New York: Routledge & Kegan Paul. pp. 652–658. ISBN 978-0-939214-73-0.
- Waters, Matt (2014). Ancient Persia: A Concise History of the Achaemenid Empire, 550–330 BCE. Cambridge University Press. pp. 1–272. ISBN 9781107652729.
- Toumanoff, C.; Chaumont, M. L. (1987). "Āzād (Iranian Nobility)". In Yarshater, Ehsan (ed.). Encyclopædia Iranica. Vol. III/2: Awāʾel al-maqālāt–Azerbaijan IV. London and New York: Routledge & Kegan Paul. pp. 169–170. ISBN 978-0-71009-114-7.
- Wiesehöfer, Josef (2001). Ancient Persia. Translated by Azodi, Azizeh. I.B. Tauris. ISBN 978-1-86064-675-1.
- Zakeri, Mohsen (1995), Sasanid Soldiers in Early Muslim Society: The Origins of 'Ayyārān and Futuwwa, Otto Harrassowitz Verlag, ISBN 9783447036528
