= Asikhmovanov =

Descendant of the family, Ivane Tulashvili - military topographer, engineer-colonel with prominent Georgian contemporaries

The House of Asikhmovanov (Russian: Асихмованов) or Osikhmovani (Georgian: ოსიხმოვანი) was a Russo-Georgian noble family.

== History ==
The family descended from the Georgian petite noble (aznauri) Tulashvili (თულაშვილი; in Russian Tulaev, Тулаев) who went to Russia in the suite of King Vakhtang VI in 1724. He elevated them to the princely dignity (tavadi) and they later took the name of Osikhmovani (Asikhmovanov). Prince Iotam Tulaev was granted an estate in Little Russia in 1742. Several members of the family served in the Imperial Russian army and are last heard of in 1843.
