= Kavkasidze =

Georgian noble family

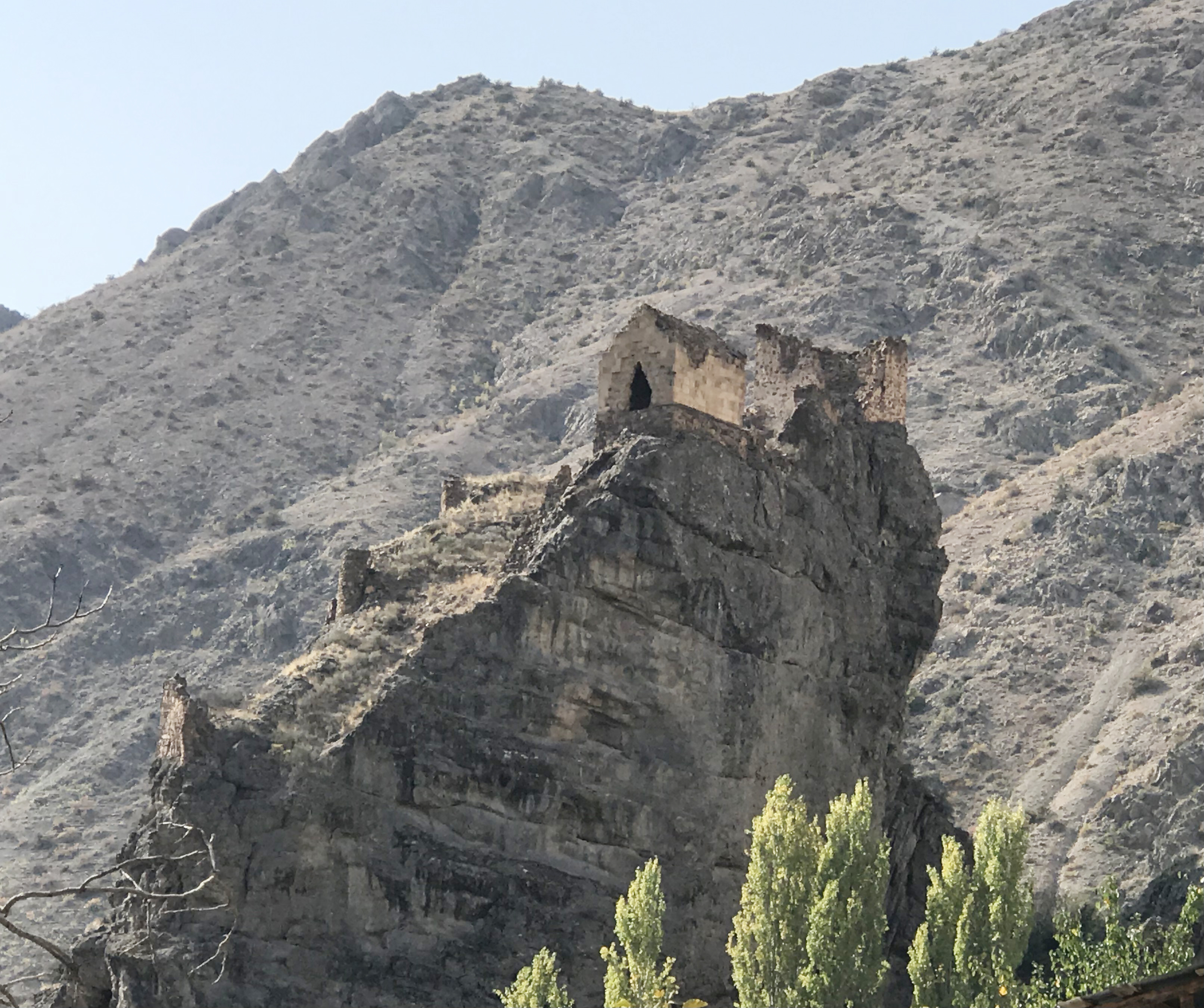
Ruins of the Kavkasidze fortress, Tekkale, Yusufeli, Artvin

The House of Kavkasidze (Georgian: კავკასიძე; Russian: Кавкасидзе), later Kavkasidzev (Кавкасидзевы), was a Georgian-Russian noble house, founded by a Georgian nobleman Eprem Kalatozishvili who accompanied Bakar of Kartli in his Russian exile in 1724.

== History ==
The Kalatozishvili family was known in Georgia since the 15th century, and were listed as royal aznauri, i.e., the petite nobility directly under the king's vassalage. It was already in emigration that they were conferred with the title of Prince and assumed the name of Kavkasidze. In 1741, the family became Russian subjects, and received a hereditary estate in the Chernigov Governorate.

The family should not be confused with the medieval Georgian noble house of Kavkasidze known in Tao-Klarjeti from the 11th century into the 15th. Their authority seems to have extended even to the monastery of Otkhta Eklesia and their ruined castle still stands near this monastery in what is now northeastern Turkey.
