= Robitashvili =

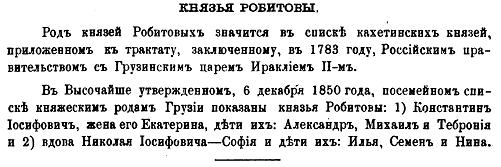
Princes Robitov in the Russian nobility book from 1892

The House of Robitashvili (Georgian: რობიტაშვილი) is a Georgian noble family, which also belonged to the Russian nobility.

== History ==
The Robitashvili had the title of tavadi (prince) in the Kingdom of Kakheti and were included in the list of the Georgian nobility attached to the Russo-Georgian treaty of Georgievsk of 1783. After the Russian annexation of Georgia, the family was confirmed among the princely nobility (knyaz) of the Russian Empire in 1850. The surname was Russified as Robitov (Russian: Робитов).

The Robitashvili had no officially confirmed coat of arms, but a drawing of the familial arms is included in Tsikhinsky's unpublished Russian-language catalogue The Caucasian Armorial, dated to 1922.
