= Mikhail Barataev =

- მიხეილ ბარათაშვილი
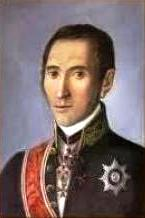
- Born: February 5, 1784; Simbirsk, Alatyrsky Uyezd, Simbirsk Viceroyalty, Russian Empire
- Died: August 11, 1856 (aged 72); Simbirsk, Alatyrsky Uyezd, Simbirsk Governorate, Russian Empire
- Spouse: Alexandra Nikolaevna Choglokov
- Children: Mikhail Mikhailovich Barataev
- Father: Pyotr Baratayev
- Family: Baratashvili

Prince Mikhail Petrovich Barataev (Russian: Михаил Петрович Баратаев (Бараташвили), Georgian: მიხეილ ბარათაევი [ბარათაშვილი]) (January 1, 1784 – July 30, 1856) was a Russian Empire bureaucrat of Georgian origin and an amateur numismatist, the first to have studied the coinage of Georgia.

Barataev was born in Simbirsk (now Ulyanovsk) into the expatriate Georgian noble family of Baratashvili. His father, Prince Pyotr Mikhailovich Barataev (1734-1789), was a general in the Russian army and Simbirsk governor. His mother came of the Russian untitled noble family of Nazimov. He served as an artillery officer from 1798 to 1809 and retired with wounds received in the Napoleonic Wars. From 1820 to 1835, Barataev was a head of nobility of the Simbirsk governorate. He founded a Freemasonic lodge "Key to Virtues" (Ключ к добродетели) in Simbirsk and was briefly arrested in 1826 for his ties with the Decembrists.

In 1839, Barataev was appointed a director of the customs department in Georgia. During his tenure in the Caucasus, Barataev became interested in numismatics and collected a unique collection of Georgian coins. Upon his retirement in 1844, Barataev published, in French and Russian, his principal study The Numismatic Facts of the Kingdom of Georgia (Russian: Нумизматические факты грузинского царства; French: Documents numismatiques du Royaume de Géorgie) – the first scholarly treatment of the subject in question – which won him a membership of the French Academy of Sciences. He died at his estate Barataevka in Simbirsk.
