= Ivan Ratiev =

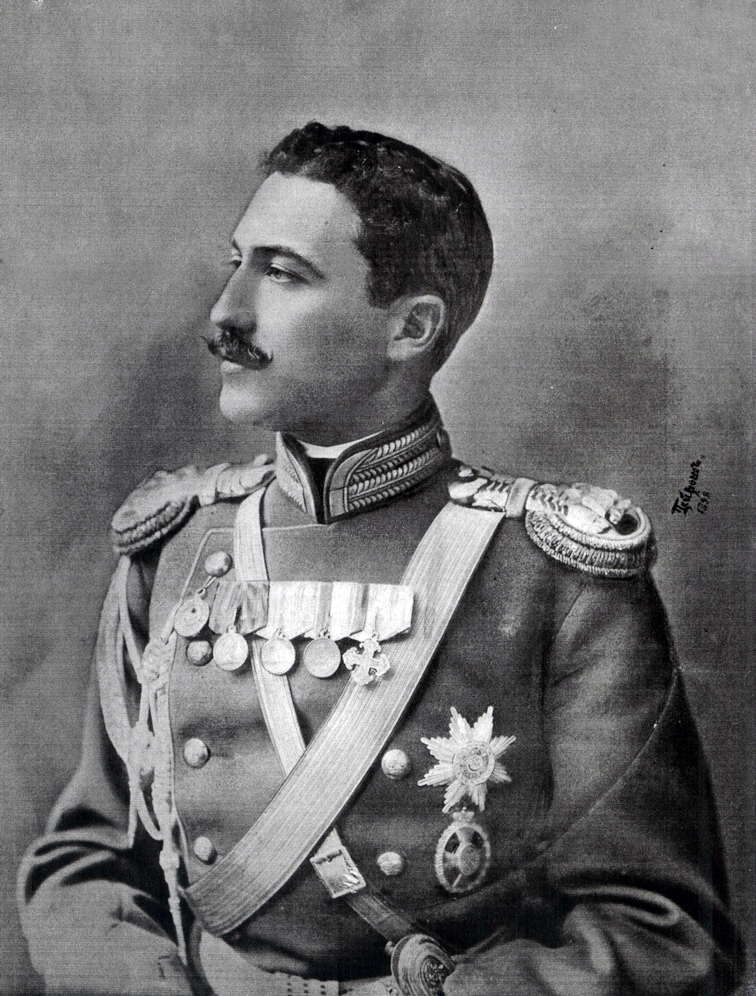
- Portrait of Ratiev in military uniform
- Full name: Ivane Dimitris dze Ratishvili
- Born: July 17, 1868; Oryol, Russian Empire
- Died: April 26, 1958 (aged 89); Tbilisi, Georgian Soviet Socialist Republic, Soviet Union
- Noble family: Ratishvili
- Wife: Ekaterine Bagration-Gruzinskaya
- Occupation: Military Officer

Ivan Dimitrievich Ratiev (Russian: Иван Дмитриевич Ратиев), also known as Ivane Dimitris dze Ratishvili (Georgian: ივანე რატიშვილი) (July 17, 1868 – April 26, 1958) was a Georgian prince and a prominent officer of the Imperial Russian Army. Serving as a high-ranking official at the Winter Palace during the Russian Revolution of 1917, Ratiev is best known for saving the imperial treasures from being looted during the revolutionary turmoil. Ratiev spent several years in the Gulag but had his sentence commuted, at which point he retired to Tbilisi, Georgia where he remained until his death.

== Early life and career ==
Ivan Ratiev was born in Oryol of a branch of the Georgian princely house of Ratishvili, which had emigrated to the Russian Empire in 1724. His father was an officer in the Russian army. Ivan Ratiev graduated from the Oryol Cadet Corps and then from the Nicholas Cavalry College. In 1890 he joined the 44th Nizhegorod Dragoon Regiment, deployed in Georgia. There he married, in 1896, Ekaterina Irakliyevna, the Serene Princess Gruzinskaya (February 13, 1872 – 1917), a great-granddaughter of King Heraclius II of Georgia and a lady-in-waiting of the empress consort Alexandra Feodorovna.

== Winter Palace ==
Ratiev retired from army service due to a trauma sustained in a horse race at Tbilisi in 1907. He then studied at Académie des Beaux-Arts in Paris and, after his return to Russia, worked for the Ministry of the Imperial Court. He was assigned to an army cavalry unit of the Winter Palace with the rank of rittmeister. By the imperial order of December 6, 1913, he was made a lieutenant-colonel (podpolkovnik) of the Imperial Guard cavalry and an acting Police Master of the Winter Palace. Promoted to the rank of colonel in 1916, Prince Ratiev was appointed as a deputy commandant of the Winter Palace in April 1917, two months after the February Revolution overthrew the tsar Nicholas II.

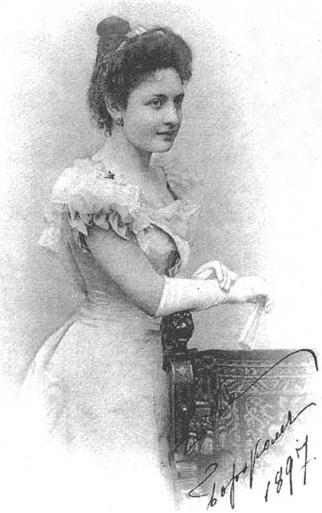
Ratiev's wife, Georgian princess Ekaterine Bagration-Gruzinskaya

During the storm of the Winter Palace by the Bolshevik revolutionaries on October 25, 1917, Ratiev did not flee, but ordered his guardsmen to evacuate the former imperial treasures to safer areas of the Palace. He dispatched his 16-year son Dimitri and two most trusted grenadiers to guard the secret depository, which, among other precious objects, housed the tsar's scepter incorporating the Orlov diamond. He then negotiated with the Bolshevik leader Vladimir Antonov-Ovseyenko, who oversaw the storm of the Palace, thereby saving the treasures of the Palace from being looted and destroyed. The Soviet leadership publicly expressed their gratitude to Prince Ratiev on the pages of Izvestia (November 5, 1917) for "self-sacrificing efforts to protect and preserve the people's treasures" and appointed him the chief commandant of the Winter Palace and of all state museums and palaces of the Petrograd district.

== Later life ==
In March 1919, Ratiev escorted the "golden echelon", a train carrying Russia's gold reserve, upon the transfer of the Russian government from Petrograd to Moscow. The road to Moscow was uneasy, Ratiev being pressured into surrendering the train and even being fired upon at Tver. Ratiev retired from the state service shortly thereafter and worked as a translator for various organizations of Moscow for several years. His subsequent life was marred by the loss of his wife and a son, who drowned while swimming in the river.

In March 1924, Ivan Ratiev, his daughter Olga, and sister Sophia were arrested on charges of being members of "a counterrevolutionary monarchist organization." Due to his service in 1917, Ivan Ratiev's sentence of 5 years in Gulag was commuted to exile to Ekaterinburg, where the family spent 3 years. In 1931, Ratiev moved to the Georgian capital of Tbilisi, where he lived as a "state pensioner" and died at the age of 90.

Ratiev's daughter, Olga (died 1987), was married to the Russian Rurikid prince Yuri Sergeyevich Lvov (1897–1937), a grandnephew of Prince Georgy Lvov, the Russian Prime Minister in 1917. Their daughter, Ekaterina, married the noted Georgian physicist Professor Vladimir Roinishvili.
