= Ladies' Magazine (1823–1833) =

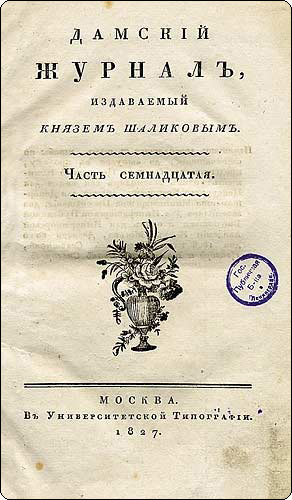
- Categories: Literary and artistic
- Frequency: 2 times per week; since 1829 – weekly
- Publisher: Peter Shalikov
- Founded: 1823
- First issue: 1823
- Final issue: 1833
- Country: Russian Empire
- Based in: Moscow
- Language: Russian

Ladies' Magazine was a literary and artistic periodical published by writer and journalist Peter Shalikov at the Moscow University printing house. The magazine was published twice a week since 1823, and weekly since 1829.

Poets Vasily Pushkin, Pyotr Vyazemsky, Dmitry Khvostov, playwright Alexander Pisarev collaborated with the publication. Members of the editorial board were writer Mikhail Makarov and censor Ivan Snegirev.

The cost of an annual subscription ranged from 35 to 40 rubles. The last issue was released in 1833.

== Thematic focus ==
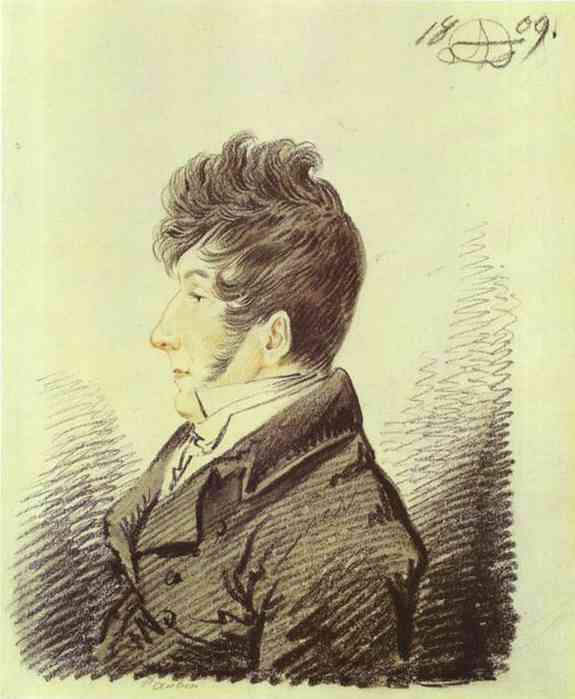
Publisher Peter Shalikov

Starting to publish the Ladies' Journal, Prince Shalikov promised to publish on his pages new works of all genres and "other interesting news for some reason". According to his idea, the magazine was supposed to replace European female publications written out from abroad for readers.

Avoid contradictions to the husband. Do not interfere in anything except household chores. Never demand anything and seem pretty small. A wife may be smarter than her husband, but she should pretend that she does not know. Carefully select friends, have few of them.

– From the teachings of the Ladies' Journal

The magazine published novels and novels, mostly sentimental (translations of the stories of Renneville, Genlis, Beaulieu and others); Much attention was paid to secular news and fashion reviews. A mandatory element of the content were ballads, madrigals, fables, acrostic, charades. Almost every issue published lyrics with notes. The section "Romantic Dictionary" gave original definitions to people and objects: "Corset. Vise of delights, graceful funnel of beautiful waist. Hat. The roof of the human building".

Ladies' Magazine was one of the first in Russia to start posting color illustrations on its pages – these were mainly drawings of Parisian fashion.

== Criticism and polemic ==
Contemporaries with a certain degree of skepticism belonged to the publishing project of Prince Shalikov. So, Vissarion Belinsky, criticizing the historical novel "Khmelnitsky, or the Accession of Little Russia", casually remarked: "You think that you are reading a tirade from the Ladies' Magazine".

Publishers of the Polar Star Kondraty Ryleyev and Alexander Bestuzhev called Ladies' Magazine "fraudulent". The editor of the Moscow Telegraph, Nikolai Polevoy, noted in one of the articles that "high scholarship is not the destiny of Ladies' Magazine <...> What they only think about the public, if they read Paris skirts and bonnets as the most fascinating adornment of magazines".

The fairly warm relationship that the publisher had with Alexander Pushkin did not stop the poet from writing the ironic epigram "Prince Shalikov, Our Sad Newsboy". Moreover, in one of the letters, Alexander Sergeyevich spoke of the prince as a person worthy of respect.

For the polemic with critics, the Anti–Journalism column was created – it was mainly led by Peter Shalikov and Mikhail Makarov. In addition, in 1824, the publication provided its pages to Peter Vyazemsky, who was excommunicated from almost all magazines, and who, after the publication of the Pushkin's "Bakhchisarai Fountain", entered into a literary polemic with the poet Mikhail Dmitriev. The discussion was initiated by Dmitriev in Herald of Europe; Vyazemsky's response was the articles "On Literary Hoaxes", "Analysis of the Second Talk, Published in No. 5 of the Herald of Europe" and "My Last Word", published in the Ladies' Magazine – they listed the "errors" of the opponent, and he was called "prose poet and non-art prose writer".

== Relations with the authorities ==
Six months after the first issue, the Minister of Public Education of the Russian Empire, Prince Alexander Golitsyn, expressed dissatisfaction with the jokes printed on the pages of the magazine and "ladies' negligee with lace". The Minister also did not like the fact that in Ladies' Magazine "sensual pleasures are set as the goal of real life and happiness", which he informed the trustee of the Moscow school district.

As a result, Prince Shalikov was still allowed to keep fashionable headings in his journal, but it was recommended that "avoid reprehensible epicureism". The publisher apologized and promised that "he will be careful in every way".

== Closure of the magazine ==
In the November issue for 1833 it was written: "The Ladies' Magazine stops". Prince Shalikov intended to resume the publication of his publication in the future, but his plans did not materialize.
