= Manvelishvili =

Georgian noble family

Coat of Arms of Princes Manvelishvili

The House of Manvelishvili (Georgian: მანველიშვილი) was a Georgian noble family, originally from the province of Guria.

== History ==
The family elevated to the princely rank by Vakhtang VI, a Georgian king-in-exile in Russia in the 1720s. In 1738, they became the Russian subjects and were recognized as Princes Manvelov (Russian: Манвеловы).
