= Charkviani =

Member of the Charkviani family in the national costume with other members of the nobility of Georgia in the theater of Kutaisi (1908)

The Charkviani family (Georgian: ჩარკვიანი) is a prominent Georgian noble family from Upper Svaneti, the Mulakh clan.

== Notable members ==
- Candide Charkviani (1906–1994), Soviet politician, First Secretary of the Georgian Communist party in 1938–1952
- Gela Charkviani (1939–2021), Georgian diplomat and journalist
- Irakli Charkviani (1961–2006), Georgian musician, poet and writer
- Jansugh Charkviani (1931–2017), Georgian poet
