= Azat =

Class of Armenian nobility

Azat (Armenian: ազատ; plural ազատք azatkʿ, collective ազատանի azatani) was a class of Armenian nobility; the term came to designate the middle and lower nobility originally, in contrast to the naxarark who were the great lords. From the Late Middle Ages on the term and its derivatives were used to designate the entire body of the nobility.

The term is related to the Iranian āzāt-ān, "free" or "noble", who are listed as the lowest class of the free nobility in the bilingual (Middle Persian and Parthian) Hajjiabad inscription of King Shapur I, and parallels to the aznauri of Georgia. See the article in Wiktionary for further etymology.

The azatkʿ were a class of noble landowners directly subordinate to the princes and to the king, as prince of his own demesne, and at the same time a class of noble warriors, an equestrian order, whose vassalage to the dynasts was expressed, first of all, in the duty, which was also a privilege, of serving the feudal cavalry of their suzerains, as well as in other obligations. It seems plausible that they enjoyed certain minor governmental rights on their own lands. The azatkʿ had their share in the major events of the country, such as at the election of the Catholicos of Armenia according to Faustus of Byzantium. During Shapur II's invasion of the Kingdom of Armenia, Arsaces II (Arshak II), his wife Pharantzem and their son, the future king Papas (Pap) were holed up with the Armenian treasure in the fortress of Artogerassa defended by a troop of azatkʿ. Their equivalence with the medieval Western knights was immediately recognized when, as during the Crusades, the two societies, Armenian and Frankish, existed side by side. Thus the Armeno-Cilician Code of the Constable Smbat (after 1275) explains the meaning of azat by dziavor, an Armenian adaptation of chevalier.
