= Karmazanashvili =

The Karmazanashvili family (Georgian: ყარმაზანაშვილი) was a Georgian noble family historically associated with the Aragvi and Ksani valleys in northern Georgia. Traditionally linked to the Eristavi class, the family was known for its independent authority, political influence, and commanding presence.

Historical accounts trace their origins to Circassian nobility displaced from the North Caucasus following the Caucasian War (1817–1864). Renowned for their aristocratic refinement, Circassian beauty, and diplomatic skills, the family ruled the valleys with an iron fist. They were instrumental in securing the Northern Georgia against raids and invasions, earning a reputation as both ruthless enforcers and shrewd diplomats, instilling both fear and respect in the region.

The Red Army invasion of Georgia in 1921 marked the family’s final downfall. Openly opposing the Bolsheviks, they funded anti-Soviet uprisings and sheltered public enemies of the state in the Highlands. In retaliation, nearly all members were executed, and their estates and town were destroyed. Soviet authorities systematically erased records, portraits, and documents relating to the family, leaving much of their genealogy unknown.

== Notable figures ==
Shanshe, Duke of Ksani - Known as one of the most ruthless nobleman in the Caucasus. Shanshe led relentless calculated attacks and military campaigns across the region. His actions are frequently linked to the alleged kidnapping of his Circassian wife and her sale into an Ottoman harem; event said to have contributed to his psychological breakdown.

Prince Kansavuk - A legendary warrior prince in the Caucasian folklore of the extinct Zhaney clan. He is linked to starting the first armed resistance against the Russian expansion.

Prince Kabard Timbiy - Traditionally credited with leading successful campaigns against the Mongol invasions, helping preserve resistance in the North Caucasus during the Mongol expansion. Kabard is remembered for his unconventional mountain warfare and night raids, which made sustained control of the highlands difficult for invading forces. He is said to have earned the epithet “Karmazan” — “unconquerable” — a title that endured in his lineage.

== Bibliography ==
- Suny, Ronald Grigor. The Making of the Georgian Nation. Indiana University Press, 1994.
- Allen, W.E.D. A History of the Georgian People: From the Beginning Down to the Russian Conquest in the Nineteenth Century. Routledge, 1932.
- Gammer, Moshe. Muslim Resistance to the Tsar: Shamil and the Conquest of Chechnia and Daghestan. Routledge, 1994.
- King, Charles. The Ghost of Freedom: A History of the Caucasus. Oxford University Press, 2008.
- Jaimoukha, Amjad. The Circassians: A Handbook. Routledge, 2001.
- Lang, David Marshall. The Last Years of the Georgian Monarchy, 1658–1832. Columbia University Press, 1957.
