= Agiashvili =

Georgian noble family

Register of Princes Agiashvili in the Russian nobility book (1892)

The House of Agiashvili (Georgian: აგიაშვილი) is an ancient Georgian noble family, whose roots can be traced back to the 12th century noble family House of Omatmatidze (ომათმათიძე).

== History ==
The Omatmatidze-Agiashvili family were entitled as the joint-High Constables (ციხისთავი) from the mid XV century. In XVII century they got the commander title and since 1753 — Heads of Royal Guard (ქეშიქთუხუცსეი) of the Kingdom of Imereti. House of Agiashvili held the key fortress of Q’araula, Ts'uts'khvat'i (near Kutaisi) and church of t’q’achiri and monastery of ch’alistavi in western Georgia. In 1810, they were actively fighting for independence of Kingdom of Imereti, for which their land incurred losses.

After the Russian annexation of the Kingdom of Imereti in 1810, they received the hereditary title of Knyaz and were incorporated into the Russian nobility on 6 December 1850 (Russian: Агиашвили, Агияшвили).
