= Lortkipanidze =

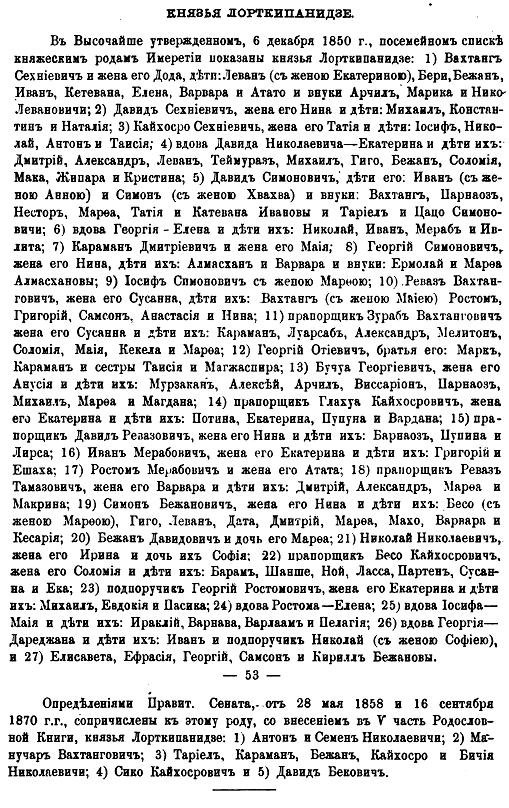
Princes Lortkipanidze in the Russian nobility book from 1892

The House of Lortkipanidze (Georgian: ლორთქიფანიძე, also transliterated as Lordkipanidze) is an old Georgian noble family, originated in the Kingdom of Imereti and known from 1412/1442.

== History ==
The head of the House of Lortkipanidze held a hereditary office of Commander of the Men of the Oath (ფიცისკაცები, p’its’iskats’ebi), formed by the members of military aristocracy owing their allegiance directly to the King of Imereti. Under the Russian rule, the Lortkipanidze family were incorporated into the Russian nobility and recognized as princes of the Russian Empire according to the decree of 1850.
