= David Mikhailovich Machavariani =

Machavariani David Mikhailovich, (Russian: Мачавариани Давид Михайлович) (born 08.30.1886) Colonel, The Commander of the 490th Infantry Rzhevsky Regiment in Russian Imperial Army from 04.26.1916 Awarded the Order of St. George 4th Class. (Decision of the Petrograd GD 10.25.1917)

Military Orders:

- Order of St. Anne 3rd class (1907);
- Order of St. Stanislaus 2nd class (1910);
- Order of St. Vladimir 4th class with swords and bow ( VI 23.03.1915 )
- Order of St. Vladimir 3rd class with swords ( VI 12.21.1916);
- Order of St. George 4th class (Post. Petrograd GD 10.25.1917)
