= Wispuhran =

Sasanian aristocratic rank

The Wispuhran was the second class-rank of the four types of the Sasanian aristocracy. The group consisted of princes belonging to the Sasanian royal family or related to it. However, the members of the group did not belong to the Sasanian king's immediate family.

== Sources ==
- S. Spawforth, A. J. (2007). The Court and Court Society in Ancient Monarchies. Cambridge University Press. ISBN 9781139466639.
