= Moskovskiye Vedomosti =

Russian newspaper

Moskovskiye Vedomosti Московские ведомости
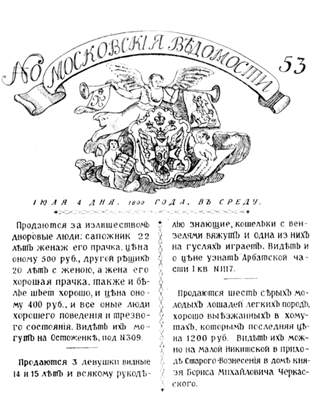
- Moskovskiye Vedomosti, 4 July 1800 issue
- Type: Triweekly newspaper
- Founder: Elizabeth of Russia
- Publisher: Imperial Moscow University
- Founded: 7 May [O.S. 26 April] 1756
- Ceased publication: 8 November [O.S. 26 October] 1917
- Headquarters: Moscow
- Country: Russia (1756–1917)

Moskovskiye Vedomosti (Russian: Московские ведомости, (Note: Pre-reform spelling: Московскія Вѣдомости.) IPA: [mɐˈskofskʲɪje ˈvʲedəməsʲtʲɪ]; lit. 'Moscow News') was a Russian newspaper. It was the largest newspaper by circulation in Russia before it was overtaken by Saint Petersburg's dailies in the mid-19th century.

Moscow University (founded in 1755) established the newspaper in 1756. With a circulation of 600, the newspaper was printed by the university press, featuring mainly official announcements and articles by university professors.

In 1779, the press was leased to the first Russian journalist, Nikolay Novikov, who reformed the weekly thoroughly, introduced supplements on literature and art, and raised its circulation to 4,000. Novikov edited the Moscow News until 1789, but his immediate successors continued along the same lines.

The university published the newspaper once a week until 1812, twice a week until 1842, thrice a week until 1859 and daily from 1859 until 1909. Mikhail Katkov, the paper's editor in 1850-1855 and from 1863 to 1887, made the daily reflect his increasingly conservative views. Under his guidance, the influence of the Moscow News rose to new heights and the circulation reached 12,000.

The daily gradually acquired a semi-official character, although nominally owned by the university until 1909, when it was taken over by the Black Hundred circles. The Bolsheviks closed the newspaper on 9 November 1917, two days after the October Revolution.
