= David Devdariani =

Georgian legal scholar (1927–2006)

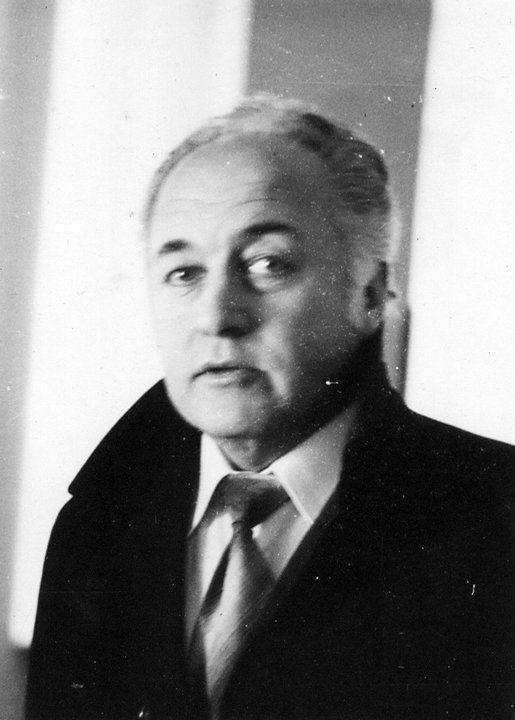
David Devdariani

David Devdariani (Georgian: დავით დევდარიანი) (November 17, 1927 – June 13, 2006) was a Professor of Jurisprudence and Head of Law Faculty at Georgian Technical University. He was the son of the famous Georgian revolutionary Gaioz Devdariani who was executed during the Great Purge in 1938 by orders of Joseph Stalin. David was born in Tbilisi, Georgia and attended the Russian gymnasium in Ukraine. In 1950, just before applying for university studies in Tbilisi, he was arrested by MVD (former NKVD) for being “the son of the enemy of the people” (Russian: "сын врага народа") and charged with Article 58 of counter-revolutionary activities. In KGB operated jail Devdariani suffered a great ordeal of which effects lasted throughout his life.

While imprisoned Devdariani began a dissident activities for the Independence of Georgia from the USSR. In 1956 after the condemnation of Stalinism in the USSR, Devdariani was released by the orders of Nikita Khrushchev (General Secretary of the Communist Party of the Soviet Union). Soon after his release Devdariani enrolled at Tbilisi State University and graduated with honours from the Faculty of Law. In the 1970s, he became the Head of the Faculty of Law and Jurisprudence at Georgian Polytechnic University and lived with his sister Medea Devdariani. During the pro-independence movement in Tbilisi in 1989, Devdariani was involved in various demonstrations and activities for the support of Georgian independence. In 1992-1993, he began petitioning and working for a peaceful conflict settlement in Georgia’s breakaway region of Abkhazia. Devdariani wrote numerous appeals and letters to the United Nations, heads of G8 and introduced his reform proposal for the United Nations Security Council to Kofi Annan. Devdariani has published numerous books and articles on Law, United Nations reforms and Conflictology. In 2001, Devdariani was awarded the Order of Honor (the Honor Medal is awarded to Georgian citizens who actively participated in the revival of Georgia and devoted themselves to noble deeds) by the President of Georgia Edward Shevardnadze for his contributions to the study of Jurisprudence and raising the awareness about the tragedy in Abkhazia. In 2005, he published the book: "The Oath Book of the 21st Century," which contained propositions and recommendations for reforming the UN and the peaceful settlements of Post-Soviet conflicts. David Devdariani died in Tbilisi on June 13, 2006 from cancer.

== See also ==
- Gaioz Devdariani
