= Anna Sologashvili =

Georgian politician

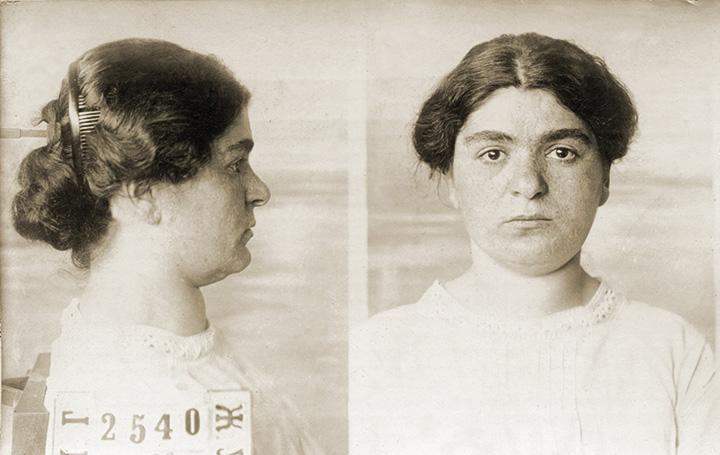
Anna Sologashvili

Anna "Ola" Sologashvili (Georgian: ანნა [ოლა] სოლოღაშვილი; 1882 – 1937) was a Georgian politician of the Social Democratic Party and member of the Constituent Assembly of Georgia from 1919 to 1921. After the Soviet takeover of Georgia in 1921, she was part of an opposition underground and later worked as a teacher. She was tried for treason and executed in 1937.

Anna Sologashvili was born into a noble family in the village of Mejvriskhevi near Gori, then part of the Russian-controlled Georgia, in 1882. She graduated from the Kharkov University with a degree in history. In 1903, Sologashvili joined the Social Democratic Party and helped propagate Marxist literature in the countryside. In the split within the Social Democratic Party, she sided with the Mensheviks against the Bolsheviks. In 1912, she was arrested for revolutionary activities, but eventually acquitted. After the February Revolution overthrew the Russian monarchy in 1917, Sologashvili became member of the Georgian National Council and voted for the independence of Georgia in May 1918. She was then elected to the city council of Tiflis. In 1919, Sologashvili was elected to the Constituent Assembly of a newly independent Georgia on a Social Democratic Party ticket. She thus became one of the five women in the first democratically elected 130-member Georgian legislature. In the Assembly, she was a member of the commissions for libraries, pensions, and elections and cosponsored several bills.

After the Georgian republic fell to the Bolshevik invasion in 1921, Sologashvili became involved in underground political opposition to the new regime. She was member of the Women's Committee of the Social Democratic Party of Georgia, which provided aid to political prisoners and their families. In 1922, the committee was transformed into a multi-party underground organization, the Georgian Political Red Cross. After the futile anti-Soviet revolt in 1924, she was no more politically active and worked as a teacher in the recently created South Ossetian Autonomous Oblast. At the height of Stalinist Great Purge in 1937, Sologashvili was arrested and hastily tried by the NKVD troika for "anti-Soviet propaganda", "chauvinism", and ties with the emigre politician Noe Ramishvili. She was executed by firing squad the same year.

== See also ==
- Sardion Tevzadze
- Dimitri Vardanashvili
