= Gugunava =

Georgian noble family

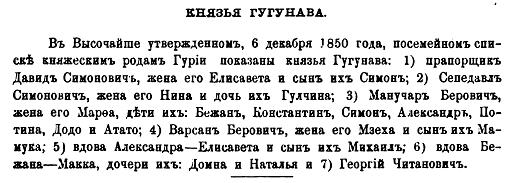
Princes Guganava in the Russian nobility book from 1892

The House of Gugunava (Georgian: გუგუნავა) was a Georgian noble family possibly descending from the medieval house of Liparitid-Orbeliani.

== History ==
They were established in the Principality of Guria, and were officially confirmed in the princely rank by the Imperial Russian decree of 1850. One of the best known members of this family was Prince David Gugunava, a military leader of the 1841 insurrection in Guria against Russian rule.
