= Kiknadze =

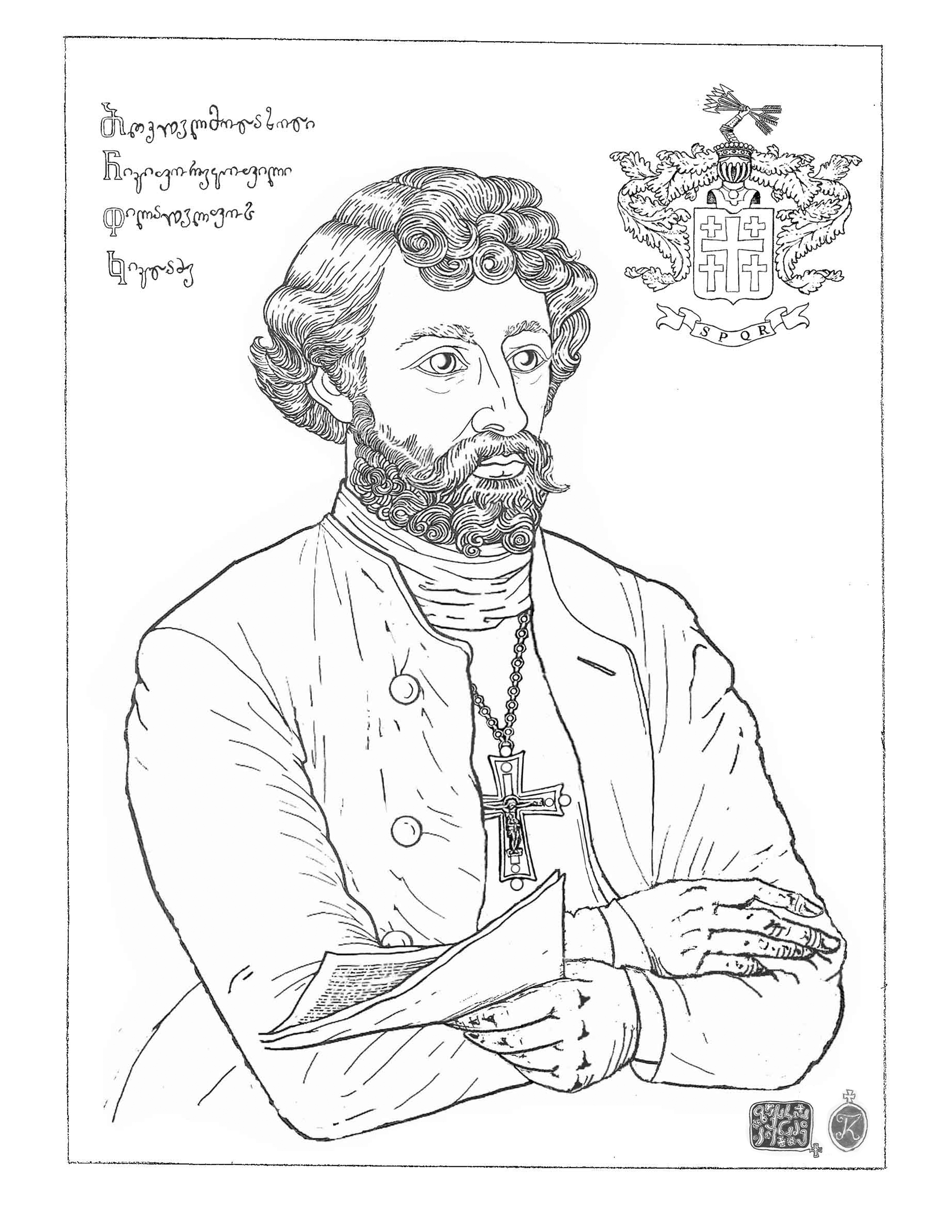
Baron Hieromonk Nikephoros Nicholas Philadelphos Kiknadze (1793-1837) with Kiknadze coat of arms

The Kiknadze family (Georgian: კიკნაძე) is a Noble Baronial (Tahtis Aznauri) and Chevalier (Satavado Aznauri) family of the western Georgian Kingdom of Imereti.

== History ==
According to Prince Ioane of Georgia (1768–1830), Kiknadze's came from Rome. One of the Cicero's (Classical Latin pronunciation:ˈkɪ.kɛ.ro; Greek: Κικέρων, Kikerōn;) family members who accompanied Pompey on his Caucasian campaign in 65 BC. settled in Imereti. Baron Josiah-Cassius Kiknadze, (second half of XVIc.-first half XVIIc.) conquered the land and The Ckheri Castle from prince Abashidze in upper Imereti and established Barony. Subsequently, this conquest was recognized and legitimized by the Kings of Imereti.

It is also surname that may refer to:

- One of the military commanders of Imeretian royal forces fighting against Russian invasion of 1810
- Anzor Kiknadze (1934–1977), Soviet Georgian judoka
- Georgi Kiknadze (born 1976), Georgian footballer and coach
