= Constituent Assembly of Georgia =

National legislature of the Democratic Republic of Georgia (1919-21)

Constituent Assembly of Georgia საქართველოს დამფუძნებელი კრება

Type
- Type: Unicameral

History
- Founded: 1919
- Disbanded: 1921
- Preceded by: National Council of Georgia
- Succeeded by: Supreme Soviet of the Georgian SSR

Leadership
- President Of Constituent Assembly of Georgia: Nikolay Chkheidze
- Vice-Presidents of Constituent Assembly of Georgia: Ekvtime Takaishvili; Samson Pirtskhalava; Simon Mdivani

Structure
- Seats: 130
- Political groups: Government (109): Social Democratic Party of Georgia (109); Opposition (21): National Democrats of Georgia (8); Georgian Socialist-Federalist Revolutionary Party (8); Socialist-Revolutionary Party of Georgia (5)

Elections
- Last election: 14–16 February 1919

Meeting place
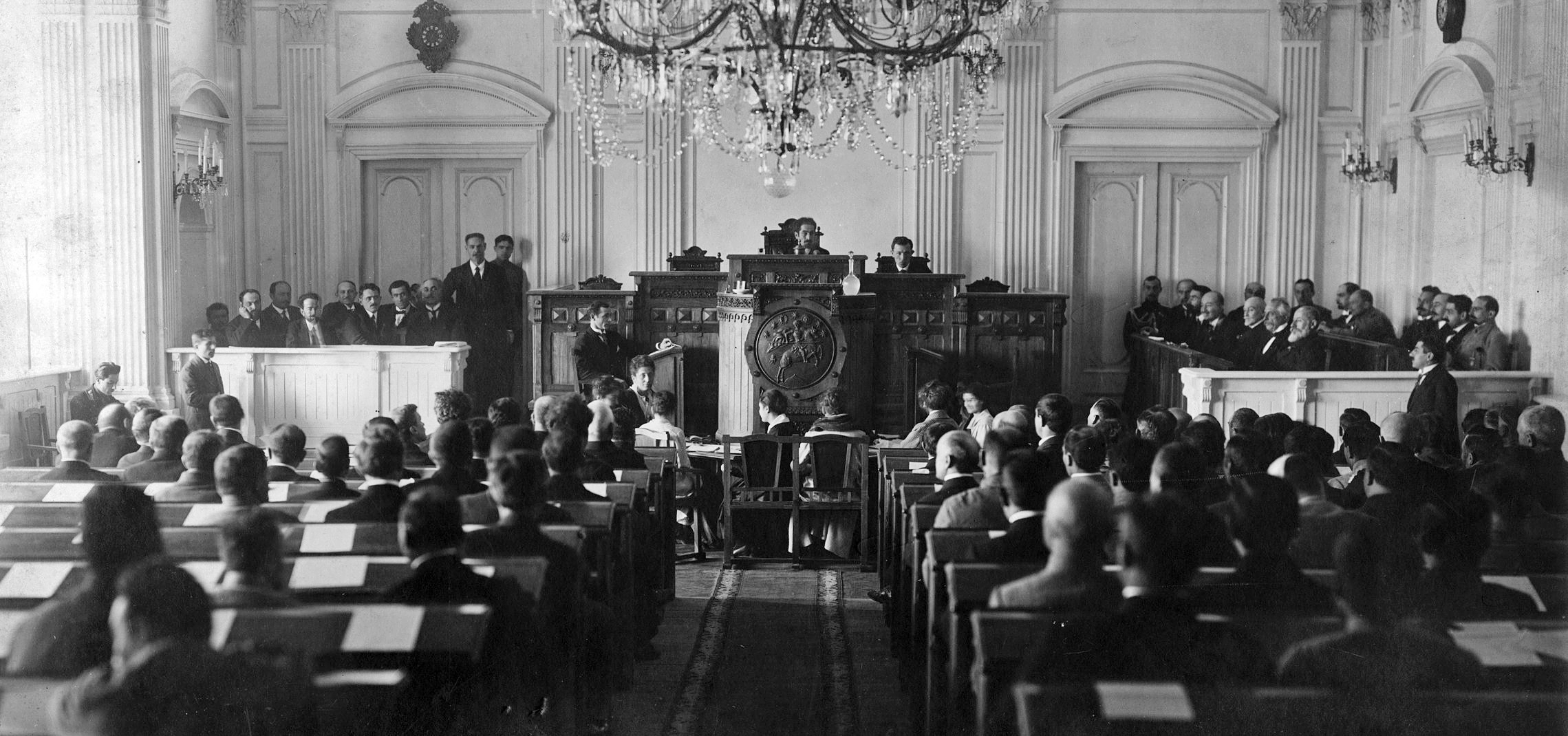
- Interior of the Plenary Hall; National Palace; 6 Rustaveli Avenue, Tbilisi

The Constituent Assembly of Georgia (Georgian: საქართველოს დამფუძნებელი კრება, romanized: sakartvelos dampudznebeli k'reba) was a national legislature of the Democratic Republic of Georgia which was elected in February 1919 to ratify the Act of Independence of Georgia and enact the Constitution of 1921. The assembly remained active until the Soviet Russian military intervention once again brought Georgia’s independence to an end in March 1921.

== Election ==
After the Russian Revolution of 1917, Georgia seceded from Russia first as a part of the Transcaucasian Democratic Federative Republic on 9 April 1918, and then as its own sovereign republic on 26 May 1918, the day when the Georgian National Council anonymously adopted the Act of Independence of Georgia. According to this act, “the Democratic Republic of Georgia equally guarantees to every citizen within her limits political rights irrespective of nationality, creed, social rank or sex". The Council declared itself provisional Parliament in October 1918 and began preparations for a nationwide legislative elections - the only general elections in pre-Soviet Georgia.

The Constituent Assembly was elected in the free and direct elections held from 14 to 17 February 1919, to ratify the Act of Independence and adopt the republic’s constitution. The elections were contested by 15 political parties and the results were a triumph for the Social-Democratic Party (Mensheviks) and its leaders. Of the 130 seats in the Assembly, they obtained 109; the National Democratic Party of Georgia (NDP) took 8 seats, the Social-Federalist Party of Georgia (SFs) – 8 and the Socialist-Revolutionary Party of Georgia (SRs) – 5, forming the corresponding four factions and the two additional factions, those of the National Party and of the Dashnaktsutiun.

The election saw fifteen women candidates stand for election, five of whom were elected to the 130 person assembly, all on the Social democratic ticket. The five elected assemblywomen were Anna Sologashvili, Elisabeth Nakashidze-Bolkvadze, Kristine Sharashidze, Eleonora Ter-Parsegova-Makhviladze and Minadora Orjonikidze-Toroshelidze.

Nikolay Chkheidze, from the Social-Democratic Party, was elected president, Ekvtime Takhaishvili from the National Democratic Party of Georgia and Samson Pirtskhalava and Simon Mdivani, from the Social-Federalist Party of Georgia, vice-presidents.

On 21 March 1919 the Assembly elected Noe Zhordania head of government, and he formed a new cabinet.

== Legislation ==
During its two-year history, the Assembly adopted 126 laws, notably on citizenship, local elections, the country's defense, agriculture, legal system, political and administrative arrangements for ethnic minorities, a national system of public education, and some other laws and regulations on fiscal/monetary policy, the Georgian railways, trade and domestic production, etc. In July 1919, the Assembly set up a Senate whose members were to be elected by the nation’s legislative body to "supervise the observance and defense of laws and to ensure strict adherence to them by all organizations, persons, and local government organs." The Senate was essentially an appellate court but also had the power to revoke any government decision contrary to law and to deal with complaints against courts.

Preoccupied with uneasy foreign relations and domestic problems in the years of the Russian Civil War, the Georgian government was not able to fully implement in practice the progressive program laid out in the legislation. By early 1921, the Constituent Assembly had drafted Georgia’s first constitution, which was adopted already in the wake of the invasion by Soviet troops on 21 February 1921, when the battle was raging at the outskirts of Tbilisi, capital of Georgia. On 25 February the Constituent Assembly evacuated Tbilisi first for Kutaisi, and finally for Batumi where it held its last meeting on 21 March 1921, ordering the government of the republic to leave the country. On 24 March 1921 the Revolutionary committee of Georgia – a provisional administration set up by the victorious Bolsheviks – declared the Assembly dissolved. A number of assembly members were imprisoned or executed in the subsequent repressions by the new communist regime.

== Members of the Constituent Assembly executed by the Soviet occupiers ==
| Photo | Name | Years | Year of execution |
|---|---|---|---|
| | Samson Dadiani | 1886–1937 | 1937 |
| | Konstantine Andronikashvili | 1887–1937 | between 1925 and 1937 (presumed dead) |
| | Sardion Tevzadze | 1882–1924 | 1924 |
| | Noe Khomeriki | 1883–1924 | 1924 |
| | Anna Sologashvili | 1882–1937 | 1937 |
| | Elisabed Nakashidze-Bolkvadze | 1885–1937 | 1937 |
| | Benia Chkhikvishvili | 1881–1924 | 1924 |
| | Seit Devdariani | 1880–1937 | 1937 |
