= Minadora Orjonikidze =

- მინადორა ორჯონიკიძე (Georgian)
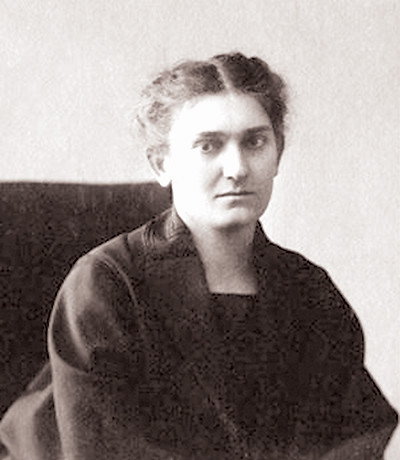

Personal details
- Born: 14 March 1879 Ghoresha, Kutais Governorate, Russian Empire
- Died: 19 October 1967 (aged 88) Tbilisi, Georgian SSR, USSR
- Party: Social Democratic Party of Georgia (Georgian Mensheviks)
- Spouse: Malakia Toroshelidze
- Occupation: Physician

Minadora Orjonikidze (Georgian: მინადორა ორჯონიკიძე; 14 March 1879 — 19 October 1967) was a Georgian politician, active in the Democratic Republic of Georgia and its Constituent Assembly. Trained as a physician at the University of Geneva, Orjonikidze became familiar with Marxism while there, and married Malakia Toroshelidze, a fellow Georgian Marxist while studying there. On their return to Georgia Orjonikidze became an active member of the revolutionary movement, though with the 1905 split between Bolsheviks and Mensheviks she follow the majority of Georgians and became a Menshevik. When the Georgian Democratic Republic declared independence on 26 May 1918 Orjonikidze was one of five women who signed the declaration, and was elected to the Constituent Assembly.

After the Red Army invasion of Georgia in 1921 she was active in the anti-Bolshevik movement, but was exiled to Moscow in 1924 after an uprising in Georgia. Arrested again in the 1930s, her husband and two sons were shot while she was exiled to the Kazakh SSR. Released from detainment in 1950, she returned to Georgia, and was rehabilitated in 1956. Orjonikidze died in 1967. Her cousin was Sergo Ordzhonikidze, who would become a prominent Bolshevik and close ally of Joseph Stalin.
