= Gabunia =

Gabunia (Georgian: გაბუნია) is a Georgian surname. Notable people with the surname include:

- Davit Gabunia (born 1982), Georgian translator, playwright, and author
- Giorgi Gabunia (born 1975), Georgian journalist and host
