= Chkhetiani =

Chkhetiani (Georgian: ჩხეტიანი) is a Georgian surname. Notable people with the surname include:

- Kakhaber Chkhetiani (born 1978), Georgian footballer and manager
- Gaga Chkhetiani (born 1983), Georgian footballer
