= Gedevanishvili =

Gedevanishvili (Georgian: გედევანიშვილი) is a Georgian surname. Notable people with the surname include:

- Dimitri Gedevanishvili (born 1993), Georgian alpine skier
- Elene Gedevanishvili (born 1990), Georgian figure skater
