= Mikhail Katkov =

Conservative Russian journalist

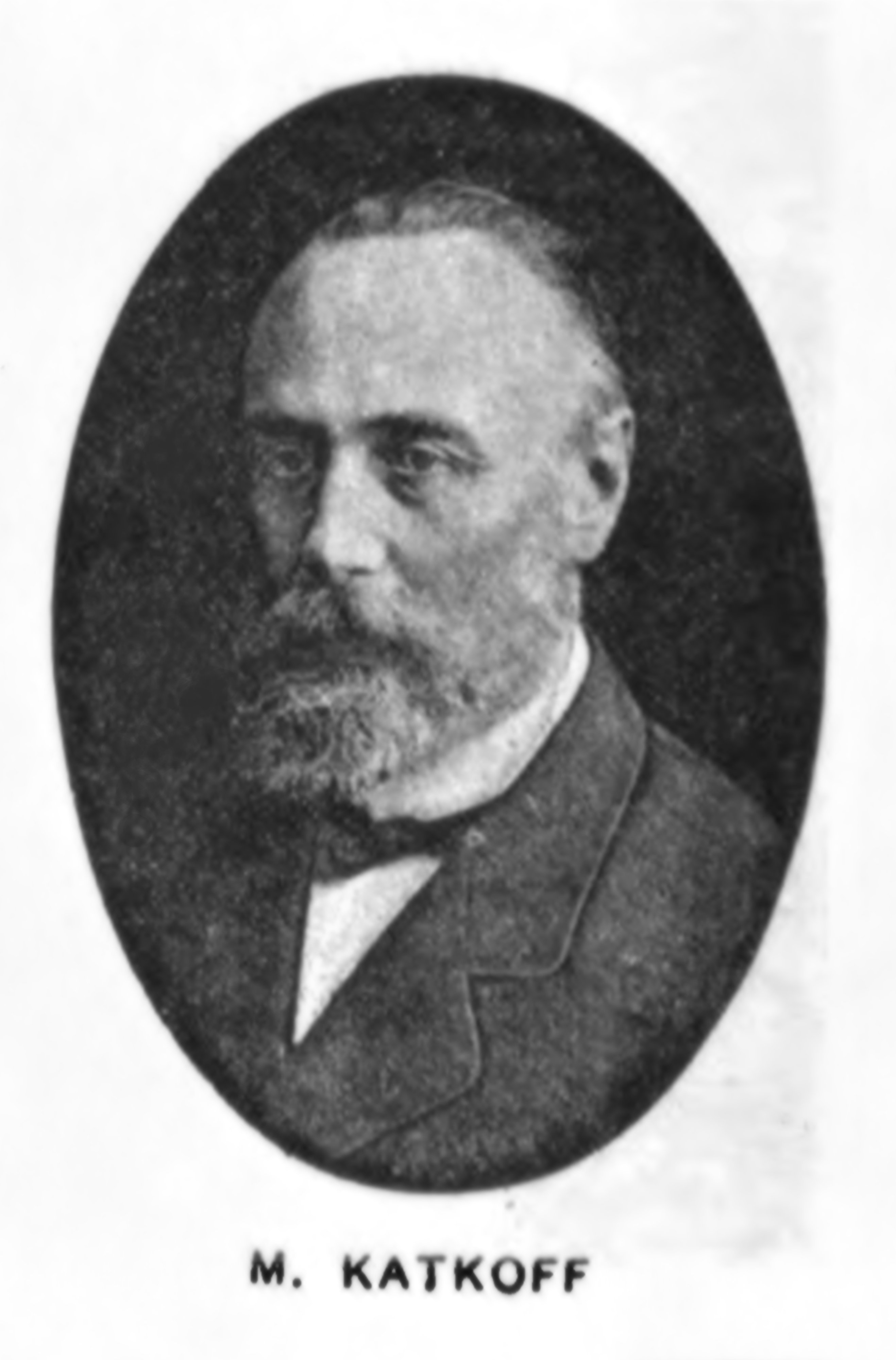
Mikhail Nikiforovich Katkov

Mikhail Nikiforovich Katkov (Russian: Михаи́л Ники́форович Катко́в; 13 February 1818 – 1 August 1887) was a conservative Russian journalist influential during the reign of tsar Alexander III. He was a proponent of Russian nationalism, an important figure in the creation of a feeling of national identity and purpose. After the Crimean War (1856) and the Polish insurrection of 1863, Katkov abandoned his liberal Anglophile views and rejected the early reforms of Tsar Alexander II. Instead, he promoted a strong Russian state supported by an enthusiastic Russian people with a unified national outlook. His ideas were based on Western ideas, as opposed to Slavophile ideas. His literary magazine Russkii Vestnik ("The Russian Messenger") and newspaper Moskovskie Vedomosti ("Moscow News") were successful and influential media for promoting his views.

== Life and work ==
Katkov was born of a Russian government official and a Georgian noblewoman (Tulayeva). On finishing his course at the Moscow University, Katkov devoted himself to literature and philosophy. He showed so little individuality that during the reign of Nicholas I, he never came into disagreeable contact with the authorities. With the liberal reaction and strong reform movement that characterised the earlier years of Alexander II's reign (1855-1881), he thoroughly sympathised it and for some time warmly advocated the introduction of liberal institutions of the British type, but when he perceived that the agitation was assuming a socialistic and nihilist tinge and, in some quarters of the liberal camp, indulgence was being shown to Polish national aspirations, he gradually modified his attitude until he came to be regarded by the Russian liberals as a renegade.

In early 1863, he assumed the management and editorship of the Moscow News, and he retained that position until his death in 1887. In the first year of his editorship, Moscow News had a circulation of 6000. By 1866, the circulation had risen to 12,000. During the 24 years of editorship, he exercised considerable influence on public opinion and even on the government, by representing with great ability the moderately conservative spirit of Moscow in opposition to the occasionally-ultraliberal and always-cosmopolitan spirit of St Petersburg. With the Slavophiles, he agreed in advocating the extension of Russian influence in the Balkans, but he carefully kept aloof from them and condemned their sentimentality.

During the 1877-1878 Trial of the 193 in which universities students were charged with treason for protesting in favour of a national constitution, Katkov sided with Konstantin Pobedonostsev in urging on Alexander III to heavier punishments and more a reactionary and conservative tone.

Though generally temperate in his views, he was extremely incisive and often violent in his modes of expressing them so he made many enemies and sometimes incurred the displeasure of the press censure and the ministers against which he was more than once protected by Alexander III in consideration of Katkov's able advocacy of national interests. He is remembered chiefly as an energetic opponent of Polish national aspirations, liberalism, the system of public instruction based on natural science and German political influence. In the last capacity, he helped to prepare the way for the Franco-Russian Alliance. After Katkov's death, his place at the helm of the conservatives was taken by Konstantin Pobedonostsev and Aleksey Suvorin.
