= Gegechkori =

Gegechkori is a Georgian surname. Notable people with the surname include:

- Evgeni Gegechkori (1881–1954), Georgian nobleman, politician, and revolutionary
- Sasha Gegechkori (1887–1928), Georgian Bolshevik activist
- Nina Gegechkori (1905–1991), wife of Lavrentiy Beria
