= Kochakidze =

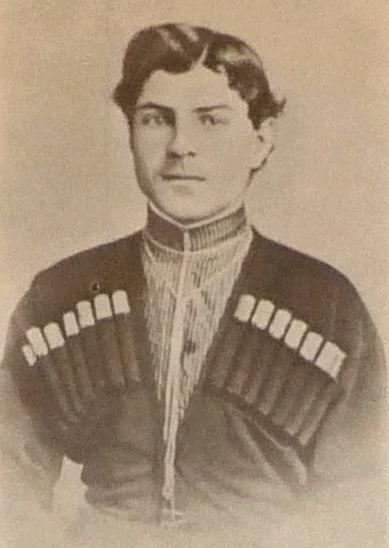
Giorgi Kochakidze

The Kochakidze family (Georgian: ქოჩაკიძე) was a Georgian noble family from the province of Mingrelia (Odishi).

== History ==
A legend traces their origin to the early 13th-century Khorasanian prince brought to Georgia as a hostage and converted to Christianity.
