= Mikhail Sergeevich Machavariani =

Russian airforce pilot

Machavariani Mikhail Sergeevich (March 20, 1888, Kutaisi, Georgia – ?) (Russian: Мачавариани Михаил Сергеевич) was an Imperial Russian Army Airforce pilot and colonel.

In 1910 he graduated from the Konstantinovsky Artillery School in St. Petersburg and joined the 39th Artillery Brigade. In 1913, on the basis of a personal report sent to the fortress of Kars aviation detachment, he was reassigned to the position of pilot - observer. In November 1913 he applied for the military flying school in Gatchina, Russia, and in May 1914 began to practice at the Gatchina airfield. After school, now a military pilot, he was assigned to the 3rd Aviation Company, located in the city of Lida Vilnenskoy province. On August 15, 1914, he was assigned to the 10th Army Aviation Detachment at the 1st Army Gen. Rennenkampf, stationed in Verzhblovo. In January 1916 he was transferred to the Caucasus Front. From the summer of 1916, he was the commander of the 2nd Air Force unit. During a critical mission, he personally shot down two Turkish airplanes and was awarded the Order of St. George, the highest purely military decoration of the Imperial Russian Army and the Russian Federation.

In 1929, he was discharged due to health, with a pension. After his retirement from military, he held various senior positions in the Georgian government.
