= Kobulashvili =

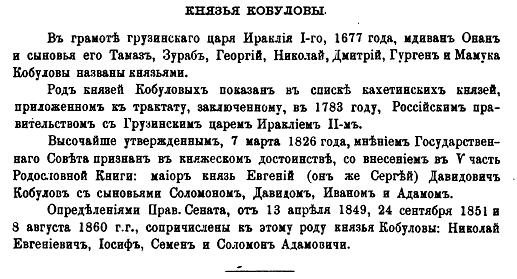
Princes Kobulov in the Russian nobility book from 1892

The House of Kobulashvili (Kobulidze; Georgian: ქობულაშვილი, ქობულიძე) was a Georgian noble family whose origins can possibly be traced back to K'obul, High Constable of Iberia (fl. 637/642), commemorated in the inscription from the Monastery of the Holy Cross at Mtskheta.

== History ==
The family was subsequently established in the Kingdom of Kakheti and confirmed as princes (knyaz Kobulov, Кобуловы) of the Russian Empire in 1826.
