= Beriashvili =

Beriashvili (Georgian: ბერიაშვილი) is a Georgian surname. Notable people with the surname include:

- Ilia Beriashvili (born 1998), Georgian footballer
- Zarbeg Beriashvili (1939–2020), Georgian wrestler
