= Liza Nakashidze-Bolkvadze =

Georgian politician (1885–1938)

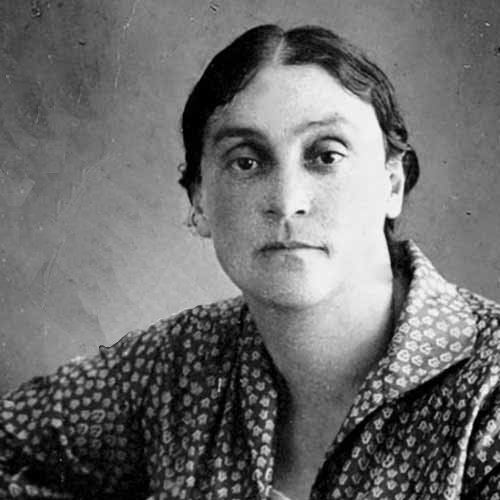
Liza Nakashidze-Bolkvadze

Elisabed "Liza" Nakashidze-Bolkvadze (Georgian: ელისაბედ [ლიზა] ნაკაშიძე-ბოლქვაძე; August 1885 – 22 February 1938) was a Georgian politician of the Social Democratic Party and member of the Constituent Assembly of Georgia from 1919 to 1921. After the Soviet takeover of Georgia in 1921, she was repeatedly persecuted for being in opposition to the new regime and eventually sent in exile to Siberia, where she was executed in 1937.

== Biography ==
Born into a noble Nakashidze family, in rural Guria, then part of the Russian-controlled Georgia, Liza Nakashidze married a peasant, surnamed Bolkvadze, and became involved with the Social Democratic Party in 1904. She was active in the local revolutionary movement—known as the Gurian Republic—and headed a women's Social Democratic group in Guria during the Russian Revolution of 1905. In the split within the Social Democratic Party, she sided with the Mensheviks against the Bolsheviks. After a period of arrest and exile by the Imperial police, she reentered the Georgian politics shortly after the February Revolution topped down the Russian monarchy in 1917.

She became chair of the Gurian Women's Society in March 1917 and elected to the Constituent Assembly of a newly independent Georgia on a Social Democratic Party ticket in 1919. She thus became one of the five women in the first democratically elected 130-member Georgian legislature. In the Assembly, she was a member of the labor committee and took part in drafting the 1921 constitution.

After the Georgian republic fell to the Bolshevik invasion in 1921, Nakashidze-Bolkvadze was arrested for being part of an anti-Soviet underground and exiled to Ural from 1923 to 1925. Following a brief spell of amnesty and working for the new government's agency for domestic trade in Tiflis in 1926, she was repeatedly arrested and sent in exile. Eventually, in February 1938, she was hastily tried by the NKVD troika while being in exile in Minusinsk on charges of being in touch with the Georgian political emigres in Europe and of leading a counterrevolutionary organization. Nakashidze-Bolkvadze was sentenced to death and shot the same year. She was cleared of charges posthumously in 1956.

== See also ==
- Nakashidze
