= Aznauri =

Georgian noble rank

Aznauri (Georgian: აზნაური, IPA: [ˈaznauɾi]; pl. aznaurni, აზნაურნი, or aznaurebi, აზნაურები) was a class of Georgian nobility.

== History ==
The word derives from Middle Persian āznāvar, which, in turn, corresponds semantically to Middle Persian āzād and Avestan āzāta- ("nobility"). The term is related to Pahlavi āzāt-ān, "free" or "noble", who are listed as the lowest class of the free nobility in the Hajjiabad inscription of King Shapur I (240-270), and parallels to the azat of Armenia. It first appears in "The Martyrdom of Saint Shushanik", a 5th-century work of Georgian hagiographic literature. A later chronicle, that of Leonti Mroveli, derives "aznauri" from the semi-legendary ruler Azon (Georgian –uri is a common adjectival suffix), whose 1,000 soldiers defected him and were subsequently named aznauri by Azon’s victorious rival Parnavaz. This etymology is patently false.

The stratification within the feudal aristocracy of Georgia, generically known as "aznauri", already became apparent in the 9th-10th century. A higher substratum began to be distinguished by adding the title of "didebuli", i.e., the aznauri who held "dideba", an especially high courtier office. Later in the Middle Ages, a clearer distinction was made between an aznauri (now dependent noble), and a tavadi and mtavari (dynastic prince); from the 15th century, the aznauri was considered a qma (literally, "vassal") of his lord, either secular or ecclesiastic. This form of dependence was later subjected to a formal regulation under Vakhtang VI’s Code of Laws which was codified between 1705 and 1708, and loosely governed a Georgian version of feudalism (batonq’moba) even after the Russian annexation of Georgia early in the 19th century. Subsequently, in the 1820s, the status of aznauri was equated to that of the (untitled) dvoryanstvo of Russia.
