= Gaioz Devdariani =

Soviet revolutionary and politician

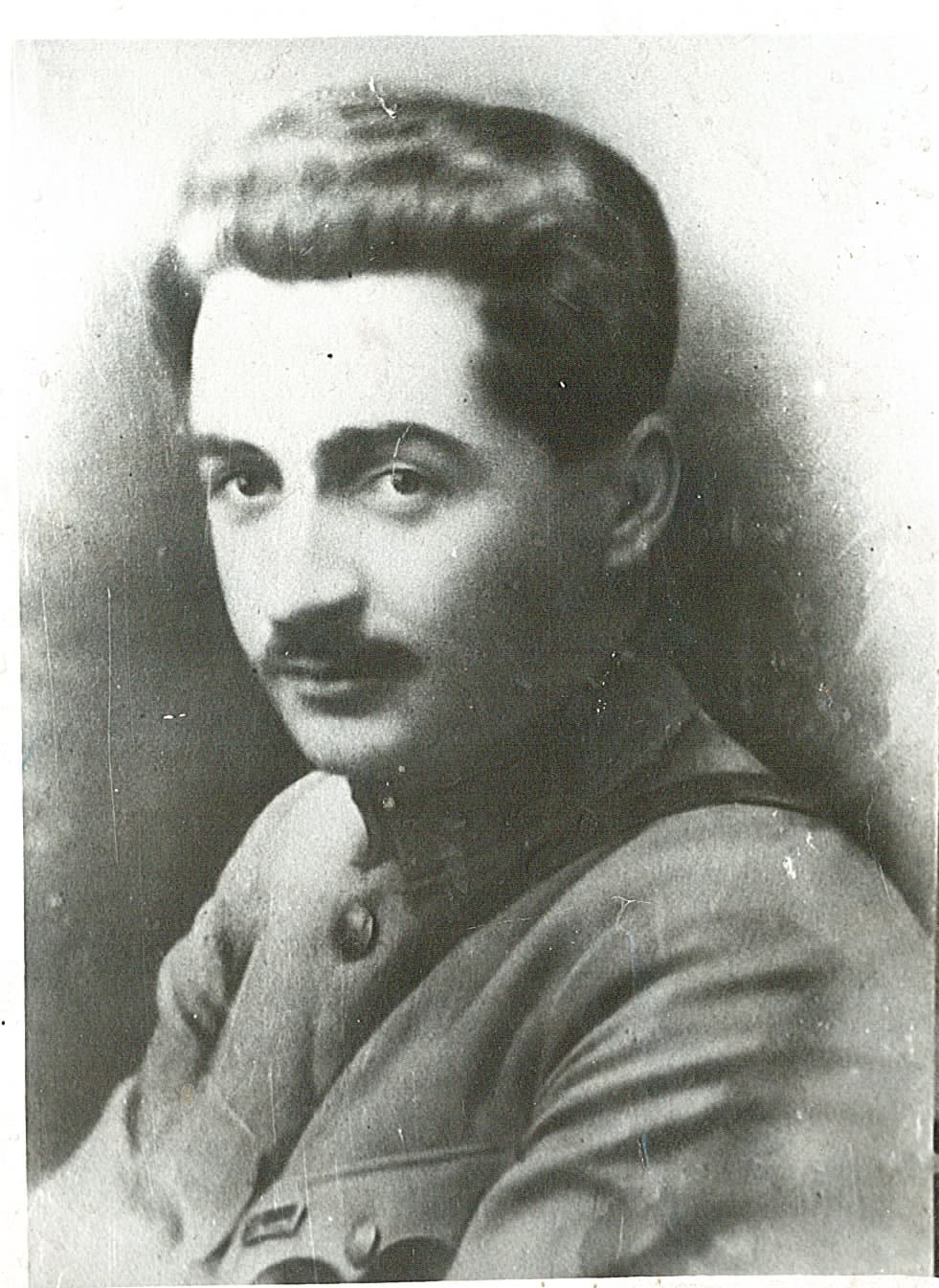
Gaioz Devdariani

Gaioz Devdariani (Georgian: გაიოზ დევდარიანი) (February 2, 1901 – 1937) was a prominent Georgian revolutionary, Soviet politician, member of the Georgian National Academy of Sciences and a victim of the Great Purge of 1937.

== Biography ==
Devdariani was born in the village of Kharagauli, Western Georgia into a large family. In 1919, Devdariani was arrested by the Menshevik Government of Georgia for plotting and masterminding an insurrection against the democratically elected government. He was imprisoned in Metekhi but managed to escape from the prison in 1920. Between 1921 and 1923, Devdariani worked in various communist ministries of Georgian SSR. From 1929 to 1931 Devdariani became the first Minister of Education of the Georgian SSR. During the same year Devdariani became the honorable member of the Georgian National Academy of Sciences in the department of Economics. After only a year as a Minister, he was promoted to the First Secretary of the Communist Party of the Georgian SSR. However, soon after his appointment, Lavrentiy Beria (Communist Party Secretary of Transcaucasia) started agitations and provocations against Gaioz.

Brothers of Devdariani, George Devdariani (commanding officer of the Soviet Division in Transcaucasus) and Shalva Devdariani held important positions in the Georgian SSR and the Communist Party. They became the first targets of Beria and Grigoriy Ordzhonikidze. In 1933, George Devdariani was shot by one of the deserters from his division. It has been alleged that Beria plotted the desertion and instructed the soldier to kill his commanding officer. In 1934 Shalva Devdariani was arrested in Tbilisi and was said to have been personally executed by Beria. After learning of his brother’s arrest and execution, Devdariani resigned from his position and moved to Zaporizhia, Ukraine. There he became the head of a military aviation factory. Under pressure from Beria, Joseph Stalin gave an order to arrest Devdariani and indict him with charges of plotting to assassinate Lavrentiy Beria and of having links with exiled Leon Trotsky. Devdariani was declared an "enemy of the people" and was denounced for Trotskyism. While the charges against Devdariani were entirely false, Beria, a master provocateur, persuaded Stalin to grant him an approval for Devdariani's liquidation.

Before the arrest and murder of his brothers, based on his personal letters, Devdariani had lost any belief in communism and confessed to his family members of being intolerant of Stalin, Beria and the Bolsheviks. Before his final days in a Tbilisi prison cell, he hoped for the chance to emigrate to Leuville-sur-Orge, France, where he would join the Menshevik government of Noe Zhordania in exile. However, he was condemned to death by the NKVD troika and executed in 1938. His son, Spartak Devdariani was sent to the Eastern Front in Penal military unit (being charged under Article 58 of counter-revolutionary activities) where he was killed during the Prague Offensive. His second son David Devdariani was imprisoned for being the “son of the enemy of the people” (Russian language: "сын врага народа"). He later became a political dissident and activist for independent Georgia. He was finally released by the order of Nikita Khrushchev.

Devdariani published numerous books and articles about Communism and Georgia, of which the most popular one was The History of Communism in Georgia, Narkvevebi sakartvelos komkavshiris istoriidan (1927, 1931), Sakartvelos komkavshiris ati tslis tavi (1927), Sakartvelos komkavshiris sataveebtan (1927) and Imperializmi da proletaruli revolutsia (1930).

== See also ==
- Great Purge
- Purge of the Communist Party of the Soviet Union
- David Devdariani
- List of Georgian people associated with the Democratic Republic of Georgia
