= Eleonora Ter-Parsegova-Makhviladze =

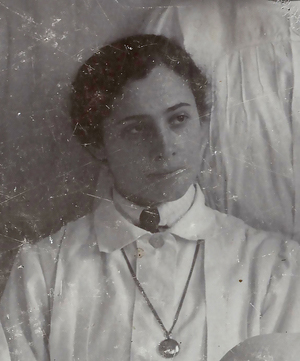
Eleonora Ter-Parsegova-Makhviladze

Eleonora "Lola" Ter-Parsegova-Makhviladze (Georgian: ელეონორა [ლოლა] ტერ-ფარსეგოვა-მახვილაძე; 18 August 1875 – c. 1930s) was a Georgian-Armenian politician of the Social Democratic Party and member of the Constituent Assembly of Georgia from 1919 to 1921. After the Soviet takeover of Georgia in 1921, she was part of an opposition underground and later worked as a teacher.

Eleonora Ter-Parsegova was born in an Armenian–Russian family in Tiflis, then part of the Russian Empire, and was married to the Georgian physician Vladimir Makhviladze. She joined Social Democratic Party in 1902. In 1905, Ter-Parsegova and her husband moved to live in Sukhumi, where she worked as a teacher and became involved in a revolutionary turmoil. Shortly after the October Manifesto, the Sukhumi branch of the Batumi Committee of the Russian Social Democratic Workers' Party, of which Ter-Parsegova was a member, took an effective control of the town, briefly replacing an Imperial administration. She was frequently seen marching at the head of demonstrations. She propagated revolutionary ideas among her students and taught them La Marseillaise, which she altered to include a reference to the Russian tsar Nicholas II. After the revolution collapsed, she was imprisoned in 1908 and twice again until the 1917 revolution toppled down the Russian monarchy.

In a newly independent Georgia, Ter-Parsegova-Makhviladze was elected to the Constituent Assembly on a Social Democratic Party ticket in 1919. She thus became one of the five women in the first democratically elected 130-member Georgian legislature. In the Assembly, she was a member of the commission for labor and healthcare. After the Georgian republic fell to the Bolshevik invasion in 1921, Ter-Parsegova-Makhviladze became involved in underground political opposition to the new regime. She was member of the Women's Committee of the Social Democratic Party of Georgia, which provided aid to political prisoners and their families. In 1922, the committee was transformed into a multi-party underground organization, the Georgian Political Red Cross. In 1926, she was arrested and deported from Georgia. She returned in the 1930s and worked as a private teacher. The date of her death is unknown.
