= Gurgenidze (noble family) =

Georgian noble family

Coat of arms of Princes Gurgenidze

The House of Gurgenidze (Georgian: გურგენიძე) was a Russian noble family of Georgian origin, from the eastern province of Kakheti.

== History ==
According to Prince Ioane of Georgia (1768–1830), the family stems of the earlier House of Shilda (Shildisani), which had become extinct by 1744 when the king Heraclius II rewarded the loyal service of the certain Solomon Mordlisdze by him the surname, titles and estates of the extinct house of Gurgenidze. This Solomon had accompanied the then-crown prince Heraclius in an Indian campaign under the Persian banners (1738-1740). Under Heraclius and his successor George XII, the family members functioned as Mouravi of Telavi.

The family features among the Georgian nobility in a special document attached to the Russo-Georgian Treaty of Georgievsk of 1783. After Georgia was annexed by the Russian Empire, the Gurgenidze were confirmed in their princely title of knyaz in 1850.
