= Baratashvili =

Georgian noble family

The Baratashvili family coat of arms

The House of Baratashvili (Georgian: ბარათაშვილი) is a Georgian noble family, appearing at the end of the 15th century as a continuation of the House of Kachibadze (ქაჩიბაძე), which were possibly related to the Liparitids-Orbeli.

== History ==
The name "Baratashvili", literally “children/descendants of Barata”, derives from the 15th-century nobleman Barata “the Great” Kachibadze. The Kachibadze are first attested in the early 14th century inscription from the Pitareti monastery and, according to the Georgian scholar Simon Janashia, originated in Abkhazia.

Early in the 16th century, the Baratashvili estates, known as Sabaratiano, included hundreds of villages with 2,500-3,000 peasant households and some 250-300 noble vassals in Lower Kartli in the south of Georgia. They had castles at Samshvilde, Dmanisi, Darbaschala, Tbisi and Enageti; and familial abbeys at Pitareti, Gudarekhi, Dmanisi, and Kedi. They were listed among the top five great nobles, tavadi, of the Kingdom of Kartli and played a prominent role in the political and cultural life of Georgia; they were High Constables of Somkhiti-Sabaratiano, and also majordomos and Lords Chief Justice at the royal court. In the 16th and 17th centuries, several noble houses sprung off the Baratashvili. These were:

- Gostashabishvili
- Germanozishvili
- Zurabishvili
- Abashishvili
- Orbelishvili-Qaplanishvili
- Palavan-Khosroshvili
- Iaralishvili
- Iotamishvili.

The main Baratashvili line gradually declined and lost their privileges to their own offshoot Qaplanishvili. A branch of the Baratashvili, Barataev (Баратаевы), was also established in Russia by an expatriate prince Melkisedek (Mikhail), who followed King Vakhtang VI in his Russian emigration in 1724. Melkisedek Baratashvili, now known as Mikhail Barataev, entered Russian service. Of his four sons, two – Pyotr and Semyon – became generals in the Russian army and governors of Siberia and Kazan, respectively. His daughters married into Russian nobility. Pyotr Barataev's son, Prince Mikhail Barataev, was a Privy Counsellor better known as an archeologist and numismatist of Georgia.

After Russian annexation of Georgia, the Georgian Baratashvili were confirmed among the princely nobility (knyaz Baratov, Баратовы) in the decrees of 1826, 1827, 1829, and 1850.

== Notable members ==
- Barata Baratashvili (died c. 1626), military commander
- Kaikhosro Baratashvili (died 1636), military commander
- Qaplan Baratashvili (died 1671), military commander
- Nikoloz Baratashvili (1817-1845), poet
- Sulkhan Baratashvili (1821-1866), historian
