= Kashibadze =

Kashibadze ქაშიბაძე
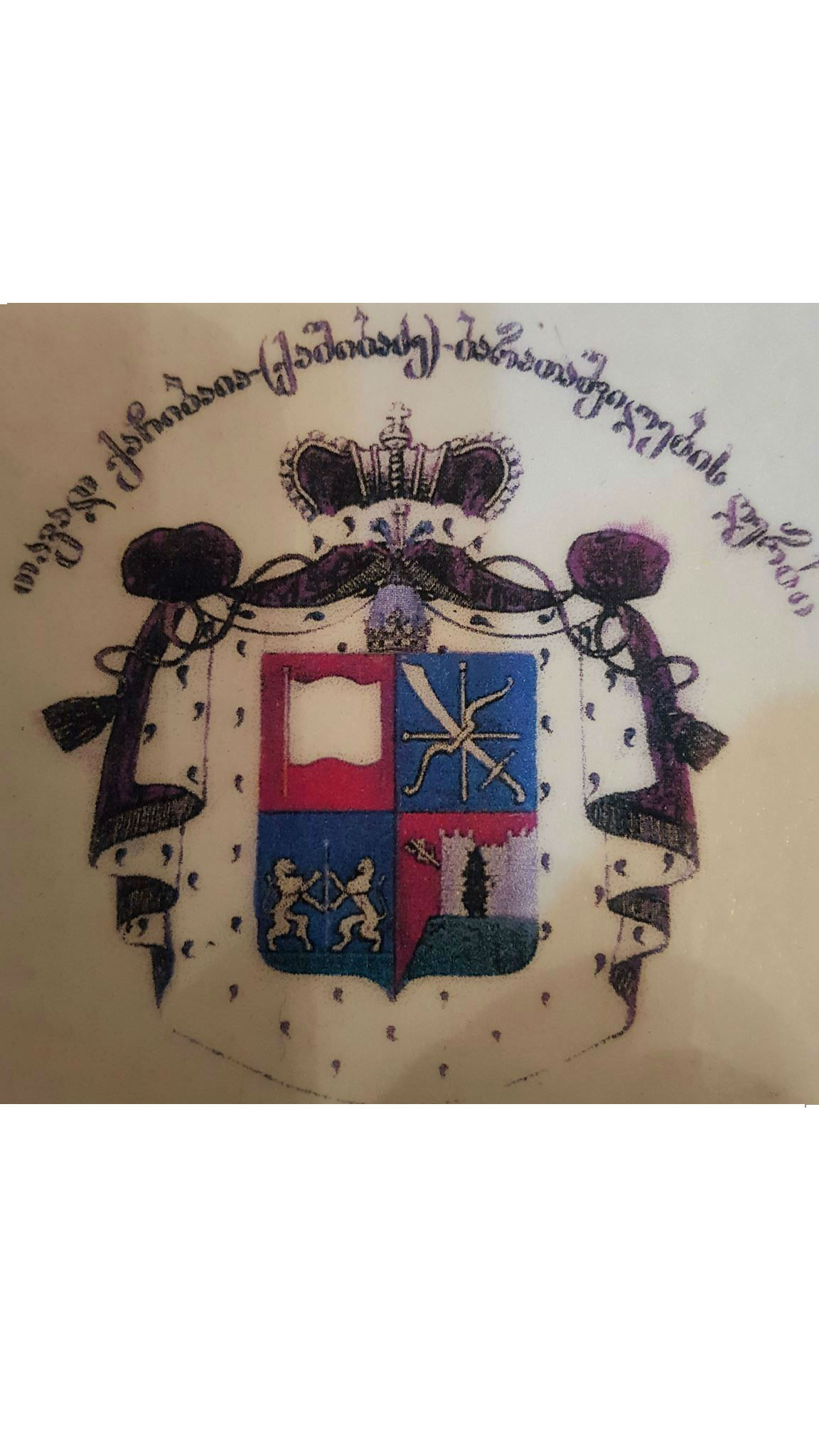
- Coat of Arms
- Country: Kingdom of Georgia; Georgia
- Founded: c. 15th-Century
- Founder: Barata "The Great" Kachibadze
- Titles: Prince
- Deposition: 1801/1810
- Cadet branches: Baratashvili

The House of Kashibadze (Georgian: ქაშიბაძე) is a Georgian noble family, appearing at the end of the 14th century as a continuation of the Kachibadze (ქაჩიბაძე).

== History ==
The Kashibadze family, literally derives from the 15th-century nobleman Barata "The Great" Kachibadze treasurer of Georgian King Alexander I. It is believed that his ancestor was King George V Amiredjibi Kawtar Kachibadze, a prominent Georgian politician of the 14th century. Analyzing their surname and given some historical realities Academician Simon Janashia claimed that Kachibaidze came from Abkhazia, and their original surname - Kechba (Gechba).

The Kachibadze are first attested in an early 14th-century inscription from the Pitareti monastery.
