= Tavadi =

Georgian noble title

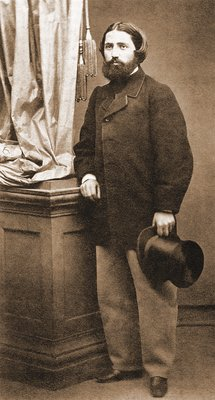
Tavadi Ilia Chavchavadze

Tavadi (Georgian: თავადი) was a noble title in Georgia, translated into English as prince. The word derives from Georgian: თავი (tavi, "head"). By the late Middle Ages, the tavadi formed a hereditary rank of the Georgian nobility, distinct from and above the lesser nobles, the aznauri.

== History ==
=== Origins and terminology ===
According to Ronald Grigor Suny, tavadi, mtavari, and eristavi were overlapping designations for the upper nobility between the 11th and 14th centuries. Around the 12th century, tavadi emphasized the dynastic aspect of noble status, while didebuli expressed its feudal aspect. Cyril Toumanoff writes that by the end of the Middle Ages, mtavari tended to designate independent princes, while tavadi designated princes under royal overlordship, a relationship he describes as co-sovereignty.

Some princely lordships developed from territories previously administered by eristavi, royal governors. In the 15th century, the districts of Aragvi, Ksani, and Racha became satavado, or princely lordships. Some families retained eristavi as a title or family name although their position had become that of tavadi.

Suny uses tavadoba to describe the growing independence of princes between the 16th and 18th centuries, as their control of their territories increased and their ties to the monarchy weakened.

=== Princely houses and lordships ===
Princely rank was hereditary and extended to the members of a house. Its cadets were known as tavadishvili, a designation also translated as "prince". Toumanoff describes the dignity of Georgia's old princely houses as transmitted through the paternal line.

The head of the house, the tavadi, held separate authority. In the late Middle Ages, the king appointed him with the family's consent, sometimes confirming a head already chosen by its members. He administered the estates and represented the house in dealings with the Crown and neighboring lords.

A princely house's ancestral lands were held in common by the family. In Kartli, undivided houses took precedence over those whose estates had been partitioned among branches. Estates attached to an indivisible royal office could be preserved from partition.

The law code of Vakhtang VI distinguished three grades of tavadi: great (didebuli), middle, and lower. The code assigned a different blood price to each grade.

Tavadis were vassals of kings, queens, mtavari, or batonishvili. They appointed officials to administer their lordships and maintained forces of dependent nobles and servants. Their privileges included administrative immunity and judicial immunity in civil cases; tax exemptions varied between estates. They owed military service to their rulers and accompanied them on hunts.

The aznauri included dependents of princely families, the royal house, and the Church.

Elevation of an aznauri to princely rank was a royal prerogative and was uncommon between the 15th and 18th centuries. For example, Erekle II granted princely rank and arms to the Sultanumiani family in 1786. The statesman Solomon Lionidze also received a grant of rank and arms.

=== Under Russian rule ===
Under Russian rule in the 19th century, hereditary offices and tax immunities were abolished, and the dependence of aznauri on princely houses was progressively ended. Princes and lesser nobles were incorporated into the Russian noble estate.

An imperial edict of 1827 granted Georgian nobles the privileges and standing of Russian nobles, but recognition of individual claims required proof and continued over several decades. The Senate's heraldic department examined documentary claims; princely status was confirmed by imperial edict or Senate resolution for all members of the recognized family.

Women of these families were also recognized as princesses. The Senate confirmed the princely status of subsequent generations.

== See also ==
- Georgian nobility
- List of Georgian princely families
- Court officials of the Kingdom of Georgia
