= Georgian nobility =

Social grouping in the Kingdom of Georgia

The Georgian nobility (Georgian: ქართული თავადაზნაურობა, romanized: kartuli tavadaznauroba) was the social and legal grouping of individuals and families with a special status in the former Kingdom of Georgia (along with its successor states). The Georgian nobility comprised princely and ducal houses and a larger group of untitled noble houses. The untitled nobility consisted of the gentry who were the direct vassals of the King along with the vassals of the various princes and dukes, as well as those of the Catholicos-Patriarch of All Georgia who had his own realm. Before the formal annexation by the Russian Empire, there were no other hereditary nobiliary titles other than the Western European equivalents of Prince and Duke. The nobility of Georgia is split into two periods: before Russian annexation and after. At the time of annexation, approximately 5% of the total Georgian population belonged to the nobility in some form, with the Bagratids being at the top.

== Archducal status ==
The Georgian nobiliary system had a title equivalent to that of a western archduke called Eristvi-mtavar.

== Princely status ==
Dadiani Palace, seat of the Georgian princes of Mingrelia.

The Georgian hereditary titles of Mtavari (Georgian: მთავარი) and Tavadi (Georgian: თავადი), both having similar roots, were granted to heads of noble houses and were of the highest nobility, considered equivalent to the German Fürst while cadet houses (and their heads), would use titles such as Tavadischvili and Eristvichili. These houses enjoying the title of Mtavari or Tavadi are recognized by the sovereign as being of the most important in the realm, of nobility from time immemorial equivalent to the uradel of Germany or the noblesse de race of France. These princely houses of Georgia enjoyed full authority over their dominion and headed their own armies, enjoying a kind of mediatized sovereignty under the Georgian Crown. At the end of the Middle Ages, the title of Mtavari came to be associated with independent princes (and equivalent to Nakharar of Armenia) whereas Tavadi would designate those directly under Crown. The realm of the former would be known as samtavaro whereas of the latter satavado. Starting in the 15th century, the newer title of Tavadi began to denote ruling princes whereas the older Mtavari was used explicitly by the five ruling princes of Georgia or by the head of undivided house. The Batonishvili title was reserved for Royal Princes and for royal cadet houses, equivalent to the Russian tsarevich.

=== Heraldry ===
Those holding the rank of Tavadi have traditionally used the traditional princely hat seen in Russian heraldry along with an ermine mantle doubled Gules. This continued and fell in line with the Russian system after Russian annexation when Georgian noble families were recognized as Russian princes.

== Ducal status ==
The Georgian equivalent of duke was the title of Eristavi (Georgian: ერისთავი), and in a singular case the Armenian Melik. In the unified Kingdom of Georgia from the 11th to the 15th century, eristavis were royal officials who governed territorial districts and exercised military, judicial, and fiscal functions. The realms under the direct control of the ducal houses were known as saeristavo.

== Grandees ==
The term didebuli (Georgian: დიდებული) came into being with the introduction of feudalism and had the equivalent meaning as a grandee in Spain applying to all of the highest nobility. From the 11th and through the 14th century, the titles of Mtavari and Tavadi were equal to Eristavi, all three referring to the upper nobility, the princes. However, starting in the 15th century, the title with its feudal connotations started to fade away.

== Untitled nobility ==
The broad class of untitled nobles were known as Aznauri (Georgian: აზნაური). These lesser nobles were divided into the mamaseulni (Georgian: მამსეულნი) or natesavit aznauri (Georgian: ნათესავით აზნაური), which were nobles of time immemorial (equivalent to the uradel of Germany) and the aghzeebul aznauri (Georgian: აღზეებულ აზნაურს), the nobility through a brevet (granted by a King or lord). It is of note that the feudal untitled nobles of Georgia starting in the 15th century, were much more dependent on their lords compared to their counterparts in western Europe, so much so that the Aznauri were considered to be slaves (Georgian: ქმანი, romanized: kmani) of the feudal lords. However, this assertion of "slave" made by Ronald Suny is based on Georges Charachidze's book "Introduction à l'étude de la Féodalité géorgienne" that Cyril Toumanoff disputes in his review of Charachidze's book where he describes the relationship as being more akin to "servant".

== Integration into the Russian Empire ==
The incorporation of Georgian nobles into the Russian nobility was a gradual process during the 19th century. The untitled nobles were incorporated as untitled nobility of the Empire and a full list of admitted families was published by imperial authorities. After the annexation, all nobiliary titles in what were the former independent kingdoms of Georgia followed the Russian nobility system. In 1837 the untitled nobles in eastern Georgia were emancipated from their princes but were required to prove the title to their lands; if they were unable to do so, they lost the land to their lords and became peasants. This was repeated in western Georgia in the 1840s.

== See also ==
- Russian nobility
