= Sharon Hutchinson =

British epidemiologist and academic

Sharon Hutchinson CBE CStat FRSE HonMFPH

Academic background
- Education: University of Glasgow (PhD); University of Oxford (MSc)

Academic work
- Discipline: Epidemiologist
- Institutions: Glasgow Caledonian University; University of Strathclyde; University of Glasgow; University of Edinburgh

Sharon Hutchinson is a British epidemiologist, statistician, and academic. She is currently a professor at the Glasgow Caledonian University, and an expert advisor to the World Health Organization. She was awarded a Commander of the Order of the British Empire in 2023, and Fellowship of the Royal Society of Edinburgh in 2026.

== Education ==
In 1993, Hutchinson graduated with a Bachelor's degree. Later, she graduated from the University of Oxford with a Master of Science in applied statistics.

In June 2005, Hutchinson was awarded a Doctor of Philosophy from the University of Glasgow.

== Career ==
In 1995, Hutchinson joined the Medical Research Council-funded Biostatistical Initiative in support of AIDS/HIV studies in Scotland (MRC–BIAS) as a statistician. The study was led by Sheila Bird, and located in the Centre for HIV Research of the University of Edinburgh. In 1999, she joined the Scottish Centre for Infection and Environmental Health as a research fellow. She was also part of the department of public health at the University of Glasgow.

In 2005, Hutchinson was an honorary consultant for Health Protection Scotland. In 2006, she was appointed a chartered statistician of the Royal Statistical Society. Hutchinson joined the University of Strathclyde as a senior research fellow in the department of statistics and modelling science. In 2009, Hutchinson was appointed as an honorary member of the Faculty of Public Health.

In 2010, Hutchinson was promoted to principal research fellow. In March 2013, she joined Glasgow Caledonian University as a professor of epidemiology and population health. She was also elected to the Young Academy of Scotland.

In 2023, Hutchinson was awarded a Commander of the Order of the British Empire, for her services to public health research. She was also an expert advisor to the World Health Organization and the European Centre for Disease Prevention and Control. In 2026, Hutchinson was elected a Fellow of the Royal Society of Edinburgh, in the discipline of biomedical and cognitive sciences. She said it was a "true privilege" to be elected as a fellow, and hoped to contribute "multidisciplinary perspectives" to societal issues.

Hutchinson has been appointed as a member to various committees for the Scottish Government, such as the HIV Transmission Elimination Oversight Group in 2021, and the Sexual Health and Blood-Borne Virus Oversight Committee in 2024.

== Research ==
Hutchinson's research is on the epidemiology of blood-borne viruses, such as the hepatitis C virus. Her research was a key evidence for the Scottish Government to launch a public health response against hepatitis C.

To date, Hutchinson has authored or co-authored more than 250 publications.

== Personal life ==
Hutchinson is married, and she has a daughter.

== Selected publications ==
- Bird, Sheila Macdonald; Hutchinson, Sharon J. (1 February 2003). "Male drugs‐related deaths in the fortnight after release from prison: Scotland, 1996–99". Addiction. 98 (2): 185–190. doi:10.1046/j.1360-0443.2003.00264.x. eISSN 1360-0443. ISSN 0965-2140. LCCN 93645978. OCLC 27367194.
- Martin, Natasha K.; Hickman, Matthew; Hutchinson, Sharon J.; Goldberg, David J.; Vickerman, Peter (15 August 2013). "Combination Interventions to Prevent HCV Transmission Among People Who Inject Drugs: Modeling the Impact of Antiviral Treatment, Needle and Syringe Programs, and Opiate Substitution Therapy". Clinical Infectious Diseases. 57 (suppl_2): S39–S45. doi:10.1093/cid/cit296. eISSN 1537-6591. ISSN 1058-4838. OCLC 24308833. PMC 3722076. PMID 23884064. CODEN CIDIEL.
- Martin, Natasha K.; Vickerman, Peter; Grebely, Jason; Hellard, Margaret; Hutchinson, Sharon J.; Lima, Viviane D.; Foster, Graham R.; Dillon, John F.; Goldberg, David J.; Dore, Gregory J.; Hickman, Matthew (November 2013). "Hepatitis C virus treatment for prevention among people who inject drugs: Modeling treatment scale-up in the age of direct-acting antivirals". Hepatology. 58 (5): 1598–1609. doi:10.1002/hep.26431. eISSN 1527-3350. ISSN 0270-9139. LCCN 81641046. OCLC 42755926. PMC 3933734. PMID 23553643. CODEN HPTLD9.
- Innes, Hamish A.; McDonald, Scott A.; Dillon, John F.; Allen, Sam; Hayes, Peter C.; Goldberg, David; Mills, Peter R.; Barclay, Stephen T.; Wilks, David; Valerio, Heather; Fox, Ray; Bhattacharyya, Diptendu; Kennedy, Nicholas; Morris, Judith; Fraser, Andrew; Stanley, Adrian J.; Bramley, Peter; Hutchinson, Sharon J. (1 August 2015). "Toward a more complete understanding of the association between a hepatitis C sustained viral response and cause‐specific outcomes". Hepatology. 62 (2): 355–364. doi:10.1002/hep.27766. eISSN 1527-3350. ISSN 0270-9139. LCCN 81641046. OCLC 42755926. CODEN HPTLD9.
- Innes, Hamish; Barclay, Stephen T.; Hayes, Peter C.; Fraser, Andrew; Dillon, John F.; Stanley, Adrian; Bathgate, Andy; McDonald, Scott A.; Goldberg, David; Valerio, Heather; Fox, Ray; Kennedy, Nick; Bramley, Pete; Hutchinson, Sharon J. (April 2018). "The risk of hepatocellular carcinoma in cirrhotic patients with hepatitis C and sustained viral response: Role of the treatment regimen". Journal of Hepatology. 68 (4): 646–654. doi:10.1016/j.jhep.2017.10.033. eISSN 1600-0641. ISSN 0168-8278. OCLC 11460329. CODEN JOHEEC.
