= Nikolai Naoumov =

British hepatologist

Nikolai V. Naoumov (born 1952) is a British Bulgarian physician-scientist, and Professor of Hepatology at University College London, whose career has spun clinical/academic research and drug development for liver diseases.

== Career ==
Naoumov’s career in liver diseases started in 1979 in Bulgaria, where he set up the first specialised laboratory for molecular diagnosis of hepatitis viruses; described the first cases of hepatitis Delta virus-induced liver disease; published the first textbook on abdominal ultrasound in "The echographic diagnosis in internal medicine", and was appointed as Associate Professor in liver diseases at the Medical Academy, Sofia. Between 1981-1990, during his postgraduate training, Naoumov received three research fellowships from The Wellcome Trust (UK) held at the Institute of Liver Studies, King's College London, to focus on liver immunology; molecular biology and liver pathology. Naoumov then joined the Institute of Liver Studies, King’s College London (1991), leading a research group with projects dedicated to hepatitis B and hepatitis C studies. He was appointed as senior lecturer (1996) at University College London (UCL) and honorary consultant physician at UCL Hospitals. Naoumov led the viral hepatitis clinical service, as well as a research group at the Institute of Hepatology and in 2005 was appointed Professor of Hepatology at UCL. Naoumov later took the role of Global Head, Therapeutic Hepatology and Transplantation at Novartis, where he retired in 2021.

== Professional affiliations and roles ==
Naoumov is a Fellow of the Royal College of Physicians and the Royal College of Pathologists (UK). He is also Senior Fellow of the Association of Physicians of Great Britain and Ireland and was elected as Fellow of the American Association for the Study of Liver Disease (AASLD). Since 2016, Naoumov serves as Trustee and Board Member of the Swiss Liver Research Foundation, Bern. He has also served as Trustee and later Scientific Advisor to the Foundation for Liver Research, London (2007-2020); President of the International Medical Club; and Member of the Scientific Committee of the European Association for the Study of Liver (EASL) (1991-1994). Naoumov serves on many advisory boards, for InSphero, Ciclofilin Pharmaceuticals and Hepion Pharmaceuticals. Naoumov has served as editor for liver diseases of the European Journal of Clinical Investigation, associate editor of the Journal of Hepatology, and special section editor of Journal of Hepatology.

== Research ==
Naoumov's research integrates immunology, molecular biology and translational medicine in more than 300 peer reviewed publications. Naoumov's primary clinical and research interests are in hepatitis B – immunology and novel therapies, hepatitis C, liver transplantation for viral liver diseases, development of investigational drugs, and digital pathology, particularly for quantitative assessment of liver fibrosis
