= Irwin Arias =

Gastroenterologist

Irwin M. Arias
- Born: September 4, 1926 (age 100); New York, NY
- Citizenship: United States
- Education: Harvard University (BS); Columbia University; State University of New York; Boston City Hospital; Albert Einstein College of Medicine; Scripps Institute for Comparative Biology
- Known for: Discovery of mechanisms of bile pigment metabolism and inherited jaundice; identification of ATP-dependent bile transporters; research on hepatocyte polarization; founder of biomedical education programs bridging basic science and clinical medicine
- Awards: Vincent Lyons Award (1958), Distinguished Achievement Awards (multiple), NIH MERIT Award (1987–1995), Lifetime Achievement Award, American Liver Foundation (2021)
- Scientific career
- Fields: Hepatology, Gastroenterology, Cellular and Molecular Physiology, Biomedical Education
- Workplaces: Albert Einstein College of Medicine; Tufts University School of Medicine; National Institutes of Health
- Website: Demystifying Medicine

Irwin M. Arias, Irwin Monroe Arias (born September 4, 1926, New York, NY), is an American hepatologist and physician-scientist known for his seminal contributions to liver biology, particularly in understanding bile pigment metabolism, hepatocyte polarization, and inherited liver diseases. He is also recognized for pioneering educational programs that bridge basic biomedical science and clinical medicine. He is a distinguished triple Emeritus professor, holding titles at Albert Einstein College of Medicine, Tufts University School of Medicine, and serving as a Senior Scientist at the National Institutes of Health (NIH), where he remains actively involved in teaching.

== Education ==
Arias received his S.B. with honors from Harvard University in 1946. He pursued graduate studies in protein biochemistry at Columbia University Graduate School of Arts and Sciences from 1947 to 1948. He earned his medical degree (MD) from the State University of New York, Downstate Medical Center, in 1952. During medical school, he was elected to the Alpha Omega Alpha Honor Medical Society in 1951 and served as its president in 1952.

Following medical school, Arias completed postgraduate training including an internship and assistant residency in medicine at Harvard Medical Service, Boston City Hospital (1952–1954), a fellowship in hematology at Boston City Hospital (1954–1955), and a USPHS fellowship in gastroenterology and liver disease at Harvard (1955–1956). He was a New York Heart Association research fellow and senior research fellow at Albert Einstein College of Medicine from 1956 to 1958. He also completed a special fellowship at the Scripps Institute for Comparative Biology in 1959–1960.

== Career and research ==
Arias began his academic career at Albert Einstein College of Medicine in 1956, where he progressed from assistant professor to full professor of medicine by 1984. He served as chief of the Division of Gastroenterology and Liver Disease from 1967 to 1984 and as vice-chairman for academic affairs in the Department of Medicine. From 1984 to 2002, Arias was professor and chairman of the Department of Cellular and Molecular Physiology at Tufts University School of Medicine. Since 2000, he has been a senior scientist at the National Institute of Child Health and Human Development (NICHD), National Institutes of Health (NIH), where he directs educational programs and research on cellular polarity in hepatocytes.

His research has elucidated the clinical, biochemical, and genetic mechanisms of hepatic uptake, conjugation, and secretion of bile pigments, identifying defects responsible for multiple types of inherited jaundice. Arias discovered ATP-dependent transporters essential for bile acid and pigment secretion, revising previous paradigms of biliary secretion and clarifying the molecular basis of cholestatic liver diseases. He advanced understanding of hepatocyte polarization regulated by AMP-activated protein kinase (AMPK) and Liver Kinase-B1 (LKB1), linking mitochondrial energetics to bile transporter function and liver cell polarity.

Arias has authored over 288 peer-reviewed publications and edited multiple editions of The Liver: Biology and Pathobiology, a seminal textbook in hepatology. He founded innovative educational programs such as "Pathobiology for PhDs" at Tufts and the NIH course "Demystifying Medicine for PhDs," which train basic scientists in clinical pathophysiology and translational medicine. These programs have been replicated widely across North America and internationally.

He has served on editorial boards of leading journals including Hepatology and Gastroenterology, held leadership roles in professional societies such as the American Association for the Study of Liver Diseases (president, 1975–1976), and contributed extensively to NIH study sections and advisory committees.

== Awards and honours ==
- Honorary Degrees:
  - 1980 Doctor of Science, University of Chile
  - 1995 Doctor of Medicine, University of Guadalajara, Mexico
- Major Awards:
  - 1958 Vincent Lyons Award, American Gastroenterological Association
  - 1961 Distinguished Achievement Award, American Gastroenterological Association
  - 1965 Distinguished Achievement Award, American College of Gastroenterology
  - 1967 Distinguished Achievement Award, Canadian Gastroenterological Association
  - 1994 Distinguished Achievement Award, American Association for the Study of Liver Diseases
  - 1987-1995 MERIT Award, National Institute of Diabetes, Digestive and Kidney Diseases, NIH
  - 2021 Lifetime Achievement Award, American Liver Foundation
- Named Lectureships and Symposia:
  - since 1990 Annual Irwin M. Arias, MD Symposium on "Bridging Basic Science with Liver Disease," established by the American Liver Foundation
  - Numerous invited lectureships at prestigious institutions worldwide, including Harvard University, Yale University, University of Amsterdam, University of Tokyo, and Imperial Cancer Center
