= TERN-501 =

Chemical compound

Legal status
- Legal status: Investigational

Identifiers
- IUPAC name: N-[3,5-dichloro-4-(1-methyl-6-oxo-5-propan-2-ylpyridazin-3-yl)oxyphenyl]-5-oxo-4H-1,2,4-oxadiazole-3-carboxamide
- CAS Number: 2411677-11-5
- PubChem CID: 146402726
- ChEMBL: ChEMBL4782668

Chemical and physical data
- Formula: C_{17}H_{15}Cl_{2}N_{5}O_{5}
- Molar mass: 440.24 g·mol^{−1}
- 3D model (JSmol): Interactive image
- SMILES: CC(C)C1=CC(=NN(C1=O)C)OC2=C(C=C(C=C2Cl)NC(=O)C3=NOC(=O)N3)Cl
- InChI: InChI=1S/C17H15Cl2N5O5/c1-7(2)9-6-12(22-24(3)16(9)26)28-13-10(18)4-8(5-11(13)19)20-15(25)14-21-17(27)29-23-14/h4-7H,1-3H3,(H,20,25)(H,21,23,27); Key:WFIWVDVCNWOMQV-UHFFFAOYSA-N

TERN-501 is a selective thyromimetic drug that is being developed for the treatment of non-alcoholic fatty liver disease.
