= Detlef Schuppan =

German biochemist and physician (born 1954)

Detlef Schuppan (born 9 August 1954 in Essen, West Germany) is a German biochemist and physician. He focuses on the diagnosis and treatment of coeliac disease and wheat sensitivity, fibrotic liver diseases and the immunology of chronic diseases and cancer. He is the director of the Institute of Translational Immunology and a professor of internal medicine, gastroenterology, and hepatology at the Medical Center of the Johannes Gutenberg University of Mainz in Germany. He directs the outpatient clinic for coeliac disease and small intestinal diseases. He is also a professor of medicine and a senior visiting scientist at Harvard Medical School.

== Early life and education ==
Schuppan was born on 9 August 1954 in Essen, Germany, to Helga Schuppan (née Pahnke) and Senate President Dr. Walther Schuppan. He studied chemistry and medicine at LMU Munich, and medicine at Marburg University and the Free University of Berlin. In 1982, he received a Ph.D. from the Max Planck Institute of Biochemistry in Martinsried, outside Munich, where he studied the primary structure of basement membrane collagen. In 1986, he received his M.D. from the Free University of Berlin, and three years later, he received summa cum laude for his second Ph.D. in medicine after identifying and characterizing undulin/collagen type XIV. He then habilitated in biochemistry (1992) and internal medicine (1996) at the Free University of Berlin. He earned his board certification for internal medicine in 1993 and gastroenterology in 1996.

He is married to Dr. Kristin Gisbert-Schuppan, a psychologist. He has three daughters and a son.

== Work ==
From 1997 to 2004, Schuppan worked as a professor, chief medical consultant, and deputy medical director in the Department of Medicine at the University of Erlangen–Nuremberg. From 2004 to 2010, he was a lecturer, first associate, and later full professor of medicine and clinical attending physician/consultant in the Division of Gastroenterology and Hepatology at Beth Israel Deaconess Medical Center, part of Harvard Medical School. In 2011, he became director of the coeliac disease and fibrosis center at the University of Mainz and a senior visiting scientist at Beth Israel Deaconess. Since 2013, he has been the director of the Institute of Translational Immunology at the University of Mainz.

Schuppan has had visiting professorships at Columbia University, Yale University, Duke University, the University of Maryland, the Mayo Clinic, the Weizmann Institute of Science, and the University of California at Los Angeles and San Diego.

His clinical work and research are focused on the cellular and molecular mechanisms of chronic inflammatory diseases and the translation of these findings into clinical practice. He has helped develop novel diagnostic tools and therapies for inflammatory and fibrotic (scarring) diseases of the liver (cirrhosis), intestine, and other organs, and for coeliac disease, non-coeliac/non-allergy gluten sensitivity, and associated autoimmune and systemic diseases. He has researched the role of the immune system in the defense against cancer, especially of the liver and the gastrointestinal tract, and the role of nutrition in autoimmune and metabolic diseases, especially non-alcoholic fatty liver disease and Type 2 diabetes. His focus is on the development of targeted and individualized therapies—based, for example, on therapeutic nanoparticles as drug carriers in combination with the development of specific disease biomarkers.

=== Key achievements ===
- Discovered and characterized undulin, or fibril-associated collagen XIV (1990)
- Discovered tissue transglutaminase (TG2) as an autoantigen in coeliac disease, leading to a paradigm shift in coeliac disease research and the development of a highly reliable diagnostic test (1997)
- Identified amylase-trypsin inhibitors from wheat as a cause of non-coeliac/non-allergy wheat sensitivity, leading to a paradigm shift in research on gluten sensitivity (2012)
- Developed serum biomarkers of immune-cell inflammatory processes (microparticles), of serum protein biomarkers of liver fibrosis progression, and of antifibrotic agents that, in combination with these biomarkers, may pave the way for the first effective antifibrotic therapies for the liver and other organs.

=== Key publications ===
Schuppan has authored more than 70 book chapters and more than 400 PubMed-listed scientific publications.

- Schuppan D, et al. (2009). "Celiac Disease: From Pathogenesis to Novel Therapies". Gastroenterology. 137 (6): 1912–1933. doi:10.1053/j.gastro.2009.09.008. PMID 19766641.
- Schuppan D.; Zimmer K.-P. (2013). "The Diagnosis and Treatment of Celiac Disease". Dtsch Ärztebl Int. 110 (2): 835–846. doi:10.3238/arztebl.2013.0835. PMC 3884535. PMID 24355936.
- Schuppan D.; Afdhal N.H. (2008). "Liver Cirrhosis". The Lancet. 371 (9615): 838–851. doi:10.1016/S0140-6736(08)60383-9. PMC 2271178. PMID 18328931.
- Schuppan D.; Kim Y.O. (2013). "Evolving therapies for liver fibrosis". J Clin Invest. 123 (5): 1887–1901. doi:10.1172/JCI66028. PMC 3635731. PMID 23635787.

He has edited several medical research books and is associate editor of high-ranking scientific journals like Gastroenterology, Journal of Hepatology, American Journal of Physiology and Journal of Clinical Investigation. Since 2011, he has been chair of the Scientific Council of the German Coeliac Society. Schuppan is the only German physician and scientist who has been a full professor of medicine both in the United States and in Germany.

== Awards and memberships ==
=== Awards (selection) ===
- 1990: Lucie Bolte Promotion Award for Research in Liver Diseases
- 1994: Hermann and Lilly Schilling Professorship, Dept. of Gastroenterology, Benjamin Franklin Hospital, Free University of Berlin
- 2004: Zetzel Visiting Professor, Division of Gastroenterology, Beth Israel Deaconess Medical Center, Harvard Medical School
- 2010: Gutenberg-Forschungskolleg, University of Mainz
- 2011: ERC Advanced Grant in Fibroimaging (quantitative imaging of liver fibrosis and fibrogenesis)
- 2015: Maki Celiac Disease Tampere Prize, University of Tampere

=== Memberships (selection) ===
- German Association for the Study of the Liver (GASL)
- European Association for the Study of the Liver (EASL)
- American Association for the Study of Liver Diseases (AASLD)
- German Society for Digestive and Metabolic Diseases (DGVS)
- United European Gastroenterology Foundation (UEGF)
- American Gastroenterological Association (AGA)
- American Physiological Society (APA)
- Research Center for Immune Therapy, University Medical Center Mainz (FZI)
