= ASC41 =

Pharmaceutical drug

ASC41 is an experimental thyromimetic prodrug metabolized in the liver by CYP3A4 to an active form, ASC41-A, that is selective for thyroid hormone receptor beta. It has been studied for the treatment of non-alcoholic fatty liver disease.

In 2023, Viking Therapeutics filed a lawsuit against ASC41's developer, Chinese company Ascletis BioScience, accusing it of stealing Viking's trade secrets to develop ASC41 which is allegedly similar to, or identical to, VK2809.

In 2024, Ascletis discontinued clinical development of ASC41 following unfavorable Phase II clinical trial results.
