= Jenny Heathcote =

Canadian gastroenterologist

- Education: Royal Free Hospital School of Medicine
- Occupation: Professor of medicine

Elizabeth Jane "Jenny" Heathcote was a professor of medicine at the University of Toronto and a gastroenterologist and scientist at University Health Network in Toronto specializing in liver disease. She retired in 2013.

After graduating from the Royal Free Hospital School of Medicine in London in 1968, Heathcote trained with Dame Professor Sheila Sherlock on the transmission of Hepatitis B. She then trained at Stanford before moving from there to Toronto in 1979, where she developed an internationally recognized liver clinical research unit, housed at University Health Network. Her contributions to hepatology include seminal work on the natural history of autoimmune hepatitis, variant and overlap syndromes of autoimmune hepatitis, treatment of primary biliary cirrhosis and treatment of viral hepatitis. Her scientific contributions to liver disease have been recognized with numerous awards, most notably by the American Association for the Study of Liver Diseases who awarded her the Distinguished Achievement Award in 2005, and by the University Health Network who awarded her the UHN Global Impact Award in 2015.

== Publications ==
- Dooley, James S.; Lok, Anna; Burroughs, Andrew K.; Heathcote, Jenny (2011). Sherlock's Diseases of the Liver and Biliary System (12th ed.). John Wiler & Sons. ISBN 9781444341270.
- Hirschfield, Gideon M.; Heathcote, E. Jenny (2011). Autoimmune Hepatitis: A Guide for Practicing Clinicians. Springer Science and Business Media. ISBN 9781607615699.
- Heathcote, Jenny (2012). Hepatology: Diagnosis and Clinical Management. John Wiley and Sons. ISBN 9780470656174.
- Lindor, Keith D.; Heathcote, E. Jenny; Poupon, Raoul E. (2012). Primary Biliary Cirrhosis: From Pathogenesis to Clinical Treatment. Springer Science and Business Media. ISBN 9789401148849.
