= C19H24N2O3 =

The molecular formula C_{19}H_{24}N_{2}O_{3} (molar mass: 328.4 g/mol, exact mass: 328.1787 u) may refer to:

- Labetalol
- Omzotirome
- TRC-150094
