= VK2809 =

Chemical compound

Clinical data
- Other names: VK-2809; MB07811

Identifiers
- IUPAC name: (2R,4S)-4-(3-Chlorophenyl)-2-[(4-{[4-hydroxy-3-(propan-2-yl)phenyl]methyl}-3,5-dimethylphenoxy)methyl]-1,3,2λ^{5}-dioxaphosphinan-2-one
- CAS Number: 852948-13-1
- DrugBank: DB15137
- UNII: 3Z11398FNQ
- CompTox Dashboard (EPA): DTXSID501005783

Chemical and physical data
- Formula: C_{28}H_{32}ClO_{5}P
- Molar mass: 514.98 g·mol^{−1}

VK2809 (formerly known as MB07811) is a thyromimetic prodrug whose active form is selective for the THR-β isoform. It is being developed by Viking Therapeutics in a phase II trial for the treatment of nonalcoholic steatohepatitis and is also being investigated for glycogen storage disease type Ia.

In 2023, Viking Therapeutics filed a lawsuit against the developer of ASC41, Chinese company Ascletis BioScience, accusing it of stealing Viking's trade secrets to develop ASC41 which is allegedly similar to, or identical to, VK2809.
