= GC1 =

GC1 or GC-1 may refer to:

== Aircraft ==
- Cessna GC-1
- Globe Swift (GC-1/1A/1B)

== Minor planets ==
- 8204 Takabatake (1994 GC_{1})
- 9749 Van den Eijnde (1989 GC_{1})
- (10133) 1993 GC_{1}
- (10328) 1991 GC_{1}
- 29869 Chiarabarbara (1999 GC_{1})

== Other ==
- Sobetirome (GC-1), a thyromimetic drug
- GC-1 (GigaCluster), a transputer system produced by Parsytec
- GC-1, an operating division of the Metro Local bus system in Los Angeles, USA
- Autopista GC-1, a motorway in Gran Canaria, Spain
- Groupe de combat n°1 (Combat Group No.1), a unit in the Free French Flight known as "Jam"
