= Schuppan =

Schuppan is a Germanized form of the Slavic surname Župan. Notable people with the surname include:

- Detlef Schuppan (born 1954), German biochemist
- Erich Schuppan (1915–2006), German parson and author
- Sebastian Schuppan (born 1986), German footballer
- Vern Schuppan (born 1943), Australian racecar driver

Schuppan may also refer to:

- Schuppan 962CR, sports car
