= TM6SF2 =

Protein-coding gene in the species Homo sapiens

Identifiers
- Aliases: TM6SF2, transmembrane 6 superfamily member 2
- External IDs: OMIM: 606563; MGI: 1933210; HomoloGene: 77694; GeneCards: TM6SF2; OMA:TM6SF2 - orthologs

Gene location (Human)
Chr.	Chromosome 19 (human)
Band	19p13.11	Start	19,264,364 bp
Band	19p13.11	End	19,273,391 bp

Gene location (Mouse)
Chr.	Chromosome 8 (mouse)
Band	8|8 B3.3	Start	70,525,574 bp
Band	8|8 B3.3	End	70,532,716 bp
RNA expression pattern
Bgee	Human / Mouse (ortholog); Top expressed in: mucosa of ileum; jejunal mucosa; duodenum; right lobe of liver; testicle; gonad; mucosa of transverse colon; stromal cell of endometrium; human kidney; rectum / Top expressed in: intestinal villus; duodenum; jejunum; ileum; epithelium of small intestine; left lobe of liver; migratory enteric neural crest cell; crypt of lieberkuhn of small intestine; embryo; colon; More reference expression data
BioGPS	n/a
Gene ontology
Molecular function	molecular function; protein binding
Cellular component	integral component of membrane; endoplasmic reticulum-Golgi intermediate compartment membrane; endoplasmic reticulum membrane; endoplasmic reticulum; membrane
Biological process	regulation of lipid metabolic process; lipid metabolism; lipid homeostasis
Sources:Amigo / QuickGO
Orthologs
Species	Human	Mouse
Entrez	53345	107770
Ensembl	ENSG00000213996	ENSMUSG00000036151
UniProt	Q9BZW4	Q8R1J1
RefSeq (mRNA)	NM_203510; NM_001001524	NM_001293795; NM_181540
RefSeq (protein)	NP_001001524	NP_001280724; NP_853518
Location (UCSC)	Chr 19: 19.26 – 19.27 Mb	Chr 8: 70.53 – 70.53 Mb
PubMed search
- Wikidata
View/Edit Human	View/Edit Mouse

TM6SF2 is the Transmembrane 6 superfamily 2 human gene which codes for a protein by the same name. This gene is otherwise called KIAA1926. Its exact function is currently unknown.

== Location ==
TM6SF2 is located on chromosome 19 precisely at locus 19p13.3-p12. It is flanked by SUGP1 (a SURP and G-Patch Domain-Containing protein thought to play a role in pre-mRNA splicing) and HAPLN4 (a hyaluronan and proteoglycan link protein 4 that binds to hyaluronic acid and may be involved in formation of the extracellular matrix) genes upstream and downstream respectively.

== Evolutionary aspects ==
=== Orthologs ===
TM6SF2 is a moderately conserved gene. There exist orthologs in several phyla as far diverged as invertebrates. 82 organisms have been identified as having orthologs of this gene. The most distant orthologs of TM6SF2 are in zebra fish (Danio rerio) and the deer tick (Ixodes scapularis). Below is a summary table of some of the gene orthologs obtained from the NCBI database.

Scientific name	Common name	Divergence date (MYA)	NCBI accession number	Sequence length	Percent identity	Percent Similarity
Homo sapiens	Human	0	NP_001001524.2	377	100	100
Pan troglodytes	Chimpanzee	6.3	XP_001140342.2	377	99	99
Mus musculus	Mouse	92.3	XP_003125904	378	79	87
Ceratotherium simum simum	Southern white rhinoceros	94.2	XP_004422975.1	376	89	92
Capra hircus	Goat	94.2	XP_005682141.1	343	89	86
Myotis davidii	Mouse-eared bat	94.2	XP_006778388.1	338	86	91
Mustela putorius furo	Domestic ferret	94.2	XP_004760922.1	376	84	89
Vicugna pacos	Alpaca	94.2	XP_006199087.1	376	84	89
Canis lupus familiaris	Dog	94.2	XP_852125.1	376	83	89
Orcinus orca	Killer whale	94.2	XP_004277546.1	376	82	88
Bos taurus	Cow	94.2	XP_005208509.1	376	74	80
Loxodonta africana	African savanna elephant	98.7	XP_003413566.1	377	90	93
Alligator mississipiens	American alligator	296	XP_006271093.1	346	67	79
Ophiophagus hannah	King cobra	296	ETE70999	292	25.3	?
Gallus gallus	Chicken	296	XP_423447.3	374	62	74
Falco peregrinus	Peregrine falcon	296	XP_005244205.1	376	59	73
Xenopus tropicalis	Western-clawed frog	371.2	XP_004760922.1	375	58	74
Danio rerio	Zebrafish	400.1	NP_001074130	374	44.3	?
Latimeria chalumnae	Coelacanth	414.9	XP_005989673.1	327	63	75
Ixodes scapularis	Deer tick	782.7	XP_002406440.1	113	45.1	?

=== Paralogs ===
TM6SF1 has been identified as a paralog of TM6SF2 in humans about which little is known.

=== Homologous domains ===
The domain of unknown function DUF2781 is highly conserved across homologs. DUF2781 belongs to the pfam10914 family which comprises uncharacterized eukaryotic proteins, some of which are membrane proteins

== mRNA ==
The RNA product is 1483 base pairs long and is spliced alternatively to yield seven different isoforms (alternative mRNAs a - f with form a being the most abundant) with varying combinations of the 10 identified exons. The microRNA miR-1343 binds to a 3' UTR site called 7mer-m8 (as predicted by TargetScan).

=== Folding patterns ===
The 5' and 3' UTR regions of the mRNA show some stem loop formation for stability. Much of this chemistry appears to be taking place in the 5' region which has three stem loops compared to the 3' region with only one.

=== Exons and introns ===
There are ten different exons and the ones expressed depend on how alternative splicing proceeds. There are four alternative polyadenylation sites present.

== Promoter region ==
The promoter for this gene is upstream and spans bases 19383923 to 19384700 (778 bp long) on the minus strand of chromosome 19. There exist several transcription factors capable of binding to this promoter region including cAMP responsive element binding protein, SMAD3, KLF3, EGR1, SOX/SRY, PAX2/PAX5 and two SNP regions have been identified as well. The transcription factors predicted to bind the TM6SF2 promoter suggest this protein functions in growth and tumor regulation as well as sex determination to a lesser extent.

== Protein ==
The TM6SF2 protein contains 377 amino acids and is 42,554 Da large with an isoelectric point of about 7.7.

=== Domains and motifs ===
There is a domain of unknown function, DUF2781 ( pfam10914 family) spanning amino acids 218 to 359 in the C-terminus of the protein. There are nine transmembrane regions in this protein. The first one contains the signal peptide which is eventually cleaved following protein localization to the ER. A terminal KHHQ sequence is an endoplasmic reticulum retention signal.

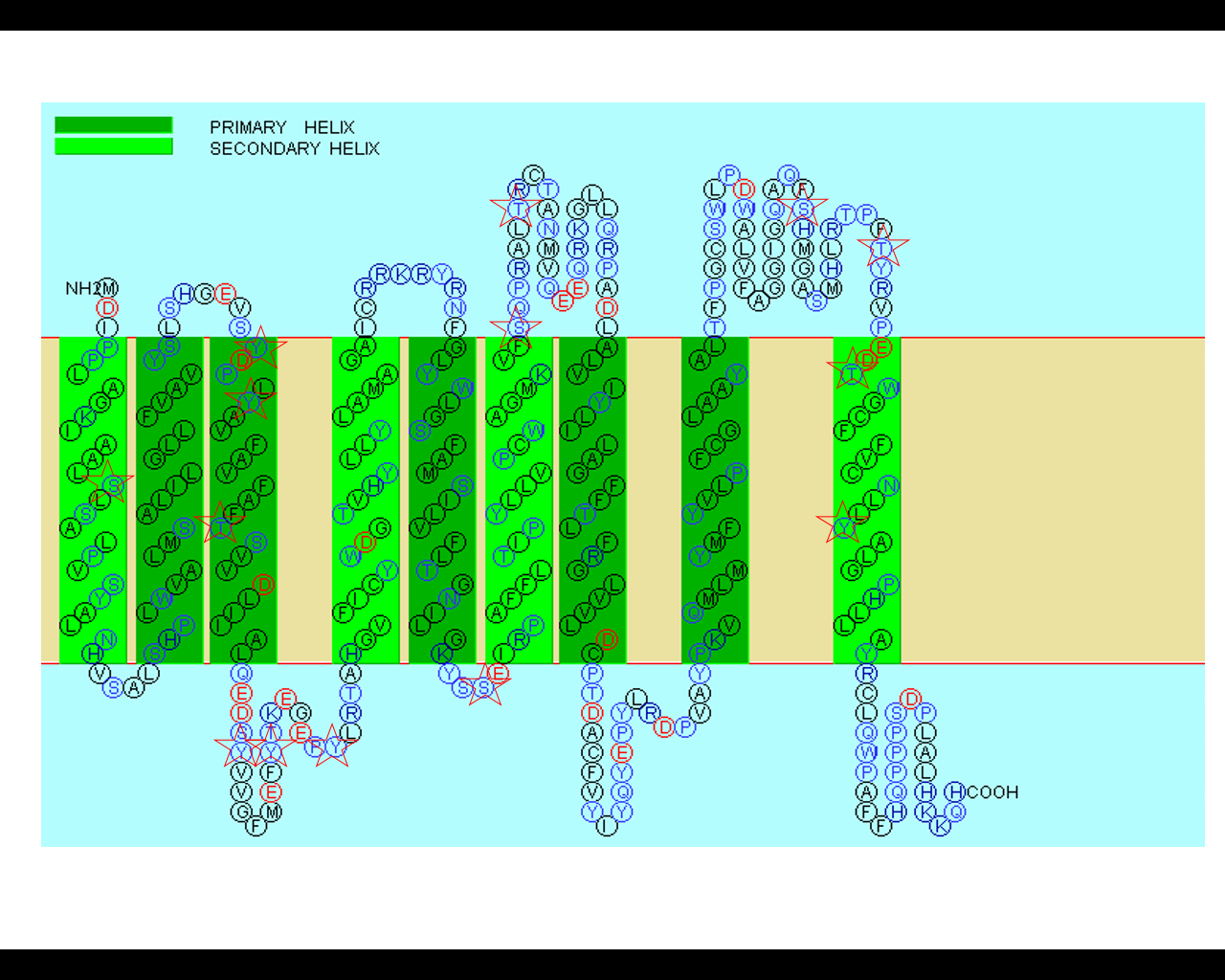
Conceptual TM6SF2 protein with phosphorylation sites

=== Secondary structure ===
Several alpha helices and beta strands are formed by the mature protein with as many as thirteen helices (including transmembrane helices) and fifteen beta sheets predicted.

=== 3° and 4° structure ===
The protein side groups in this protein do not necessarily interact in a manner to form tertiary and quaternary structures. The cysteines present are not predicted to form stable disulfide bonds.

=== Post-translational modifications ===
Two main post-translational modifications occur; phosphorylation at tyrosine, serine and tryptophan sites and two low probability sumoylation sites.

=== Expression patterns ===
In humans, TM6SF2 expression has been documented in the adult stage only specifically in the intestine and liver in moderate amounts as well as embryonic tissue and ovary at low levels. Other sources indicate expression in brain, lung, testis, stomach, heart, colon, kidney and adipose tissue.

Protein subcellular localization studies with confocal microscopy demonstrated that TM6SF2 is localized in the endoplasmic reticulum and the ER-Golgi intermediate compartment of human liver cells.

=== Protein interactions ===
No known protein-protein interactions have been established thus far.

== Clinical significance ==
In a study that used pre-made kits to predict cardiac allograft rejection using peripheral blood only, graft rejection was associated with decreased levels of TM6SF2 expression, alongside other genes.

A variant TM6SF2 gene causes susceptibility to nonalcoholic fatty liver disease due to impaired very low density lipoprotein (VLDL) production.

TM6SF2 inhibition was associated with reduced secretion of TG-rich lipoproteins (TRLs) and increased cellular TG concentration and lipid droplet content, whereas TM6SF2 overexpression reduced liver cell steatosis. TM6SF2 is a regulator of liver fat metabolism with opposing effects on the secretion of TRLs and hepatic lipid droplet content.
