= Eprotirome =

Chemical compound

Identifiers
- IUPAC name: 2-({3,5-Dibromo-4-[4-hydroxy-3-(propan-2-yl)phenoxy]phenyl}carbamoyl)acetic acid
- CAS Number: 355129-15-6
- PubChem CID: 10299876
- DrugBank: DB05035
- ChemSpider: 8475344
- UNII: 958AQ7B6R1
- ChEMBL: ChEMBL2035874
- CompTox Dashboard (EPA): DTXSID00189021

Chemical and physical data
- Formula: C_{18}H_{17}Br_{2}N_{2}O_{5}
- Molar mass: 501.151 g·mol^{−1}
- 3D model (JSmol): Interactive image
- SMILES: CC(C)C1=C(C=CC(=C1)OC2=C(C=C(C=C2Br)NC(=O)CC(=O)O)Br)O
- InChI: InChI=1S/C18H17Br2NO5/c1-9(2)12-7-11(3-4-15(12)22)26-18-13(19)5-10(6-14(18)20)21-16(23)8-17(24)25/h3-7,9,22H,8H2,1-2H3,(H,21,23)(H,24,25); Key:VPCSYAVXDAUHLT-UHFFFAOYSA-N

Eprotirome is a thyromimetic drug that has been investigated for the treatment of dyslipidemia. A Phase III trial in humans was discontinued after the drug was found to have negative effects on cartilage in dogs.
