= Lipogenesis inhibitor =

Lipogenesis inhibitor is a class of drug that works by inhibiting de novo lipogenesis—the generation of fatty acids in the body. These drugs target enzymes involved in lipogenesis, such as citrate/isocitrate carrier (CIC), ATP-citrate lyase (ACLY), acetyl-CoA carboxylase (ACC) and fatty acid synthase (FAS). Lipogenesis plays a role in energy intake and expenditure, lipid deposition, insulin sensitivity, cancer, cardiovascular disease, the immune system, and neurogenesis. Potential therapeutic applications for inhibitors include metabolic dysfunction–associated steatotic liver disease, type 2 diabetes, and cardiovascular disease.
