= Megamitochondria =

Pathologic finding

Megamitochondria is extremely large and abnormal shapes of mitochondria seen in hepatocytes in alcoholic liver disease and in nutritional deficiencies. It can be seen in conditions of hypertrophy in cell death.
