= European Association for the Study of the Liver =

- Type: Non-profit organisation
- Founded: 1966
- Headquarters: Geneva, Switzerland
- Members: 3589 (April 2014)
- Website: EASL

The European Association for the Study of the Liver (EASL), founded in 1966, is a medical association concerned with liver research, the clinical practice of liver disorders, and providing education to all those interested in hepatology. As of 2024, EASL serves 7,000 members from 112 countries.

== History ==
EASL was founded by the German physician Gustav-Adolf Martini in April 1966, in Marburg, Germany, to promote research on the liver and its pathology and to improve therapy for liver disorders. EASL's founding was inspired by the American Association for the Study of Liver Diseases (AASLD, created in November 1949) and the International Association for the Study of the Liver (IASL, created in 1958).

== Structure ==
EASL is a nonprofit organization, composed solely of individual members, that performs its duties under a written constitution managed by the EASL Governing Board made up of 11 elected members: the Secretary General, the Vice-Secretary, the Scientific Committee (five persons), the Treasurer, the Educational Councillors (two persons), and the European Policy Councillor. EASL is an Ordinary Member of the United European Gastroenterology.

EASL members meet several times per year and have the annual general meeting during the International Liver Congress.

== International Liver Congress ==
EASL organizes the International Liver Congress, held in various European cities, usually in April. This is an annual scientific meeting where experts and researchers receive information on the latest research, perspectives and treatments of liver disease. Medical experts and specialists will share recent data, present studies and findings, and discuss topics on liver disease. The International Liver Congress attracts more than 9,000 delegates from all over the world.

== Journal of Hepatology ==
The Journal of Hepatology is a monthly, English language, peer-reviewed journal, edited by EASL and published by Elsevier. As the official journal of EASL, it provides an international forum for the publication of original articles, reviews and letters to the Editor describing basic laboratory, translational, and clinical investigations in hepatology. All articles undergo a rigorous peer review and are selected based on the originality of the findings, the superior quality of the work described, and the clarity of presentation. In 2021, the Journal of Hepatology had an impact factor of 30.083.

The Journal of Hepatology also publishes EASL's Clinical Practice Guidelines. These guidelines assist physicians, healthcare providers, patients and other interested parties in the clinical decision-making process. The EASL Guidelines present a range of approaches for the diagnosis and treatment of liver diseases.

== See also ==
- American Association for the Study of Liver Diseases
- American Liver Foundation
