= Resmetirom =

Chemical compound

Clinical data
- Trade names: Rezdiffra
- Other names: MGL-3196
- AHFS/Drugs.com: Monograph
- MedlinePlus: a624021
- License data: US DailyMed: Resmetirom
- Routes of administration: By mouth
- ATC code: A05BA11 (WHO)

Legal status
- Legal status: US: ℞-only; EU: Rx-only

Identifiers
- IUPAC name: 2-[3,5-dichloro-4-[(6-oxo-5-propan-2-yl-1H-pyridazin-3-yl)oxy]phenyl]-3,5-dioxo-1,2,4-triazine-6-carbonitrile
- CAS Number: 920509-32-6
- PubChem CID: 15981237
- DrugBank: DB12914
- UNII: RE0V0T1ES0
- KEGG: D11602
- ChEMBL: ChEMBL3261331
- CompTox Dashboard (EPA): DTXSID601352610

Chemical and physical data
- Formula: C_{17}H_{12}Cl_{2}N_{6}O_{4}
- Molar mass: 435.22 g·mol^{−1}
- 3D model (JSmol): Interactive image
- SMILES: CC(C)C1=CC(=NNC1=O)OC2=C(C=C(C=C2Cl)N3C(=O)NC(=O)C(=N3)C#N)Cl
- InChI: InChI=1S/C17H12Cl2N6O4/c1-7(2)9-5-13(22-23-15(9)26)29-14-10(18)3-8(4-11(14)19)25-17(28)21-16(27)12(6-20)24-25/h3-5,7H,1-2H3,(H,23,26)(H,21,27,28); Key:FDBYIYFVSAHJLY-UHFFFAOYSA-N

Resmetirom, sold under the brand name Rezdiffra, is a medication used to treat a form of fatty liver disease. Specifically it is used in the treatment of non-cirrhotic metabolic dysfunction associated steatohepatitis (MASH) (formerly known as nonalcoholic steatohepatitis NASH). It is structurally similar to the thyroid hormone triiodothyronine and acts as an agonist of the thyroid hormone receptor beta (NR1A2).

The most common side effects include diarrhea and nausea.

Resmetirom was approved for medical use in the US in March 2024, and in the European Union in August 2025. The US Food and Drug Administration considers it to be a first-in-class medication.

== Medical uses ==
Resmetirom is indicated, in conjunction with diet and exercise, for the treatment of adults with noncirrhotic nonalcoholic steatohepatitis with moderate to advanced liver fibrosis (consistent with stages F2 to F3 fibrosis).

== History ==
In a phase III clinical trial, it was found to be effective for resolving noncirrhotic nonalcoholic steatohepatitis and improving liver fibrosis.

The US Food and Drug Administration (FDA) evaluated the safety and efficacy of resmetirom based on an analysis of a surrogate endpoint at month twelve in a 54-month, randomized, double-blind placebo-controlled trial. The surrogate endpoint measured the extent of liver inflammation and scarring. The FDA requires the sponsor to conduct a postapproval study to verify and describe the clinical benefit of resmetirom, which will be done through completing the same 54-month study. In the trial, 888 participants were randomly assigned to receive one of the following: placebo (294 participants); 80 milligrams of resmetirom (298 participants); or 100 milligrams of resmetirom (296 participants); once daily, in addition to standard care for noncirrhotic nonalcoholic steatohepatitis, which includes counseling for healthy diet and exercise.

The FDA granted the application for resmetirom accelerated approval, along with breakthrough therapy, fast track, and priority review designations. The FDA granted the approval of Rezdiffra to Madrigal Pharmaceuticals.

== Society and culture ==
=== Legal status ===
Resmetirom was approved for medical use in the US in March 2024.

In June 2025, the Committee for Medicinal Products for Human Use of the European Medicines Agency adopted a positive opinion, recommending the granting of a conditional marketing authorization for the medicinal product Rezdiffra, intended for the treatment of adults with noncirrhotic metabolic dysfunction-associated steatohepatitis (MASH). The applicant for this medicinal product is Madrigal Pharmaceuticals EU Limited. Resmetirom was authorized for medical use in the European Union in August 2025.

== Research ==
A systematic review and meta-analysis of resmetirom, published in 2024, found that it is well tolerated and that it improves hepatic fat content, liver enzymes, and fibrosis biomarkers in people with non-alcoholic steatohepatitis (NASH).
