= American Liver Foundation =

American non-profit organization

- Type: Non-profit
- Founded: 1976
- Founder: American Association for the Study of Liver Diseases
- Headquarters: 39 Broadway, Suite 2700; New York, NY 10006; Helpline: 800-GO-LIVER
- Key people: Lorraine Stiehl (President and Chief Executive Officer), Lynn Seim (Chief Operating Officer), Erika Goodman (Chief Development & Marketing Officer), David Ticker (Chief Financial Officer), Nicholas J. DeRoma (Board Chair)
- Revenue: 9,409,699 United States dollar (2017)
- Total assets: 8,657,364 United States dollar (2022)
- Website: www.liverfoundation.org

The American Liver Foundation (ALF) is a non-profit organization that promotes liver health and disease prevention. The mission of the ALF is to facilitate, advocate and promote education, support and research for the prevention, treatment, and cure of liver disease.

== ALF History ==
Although liver disease is among the ten major causes of death in the United States, there was no national voluntary health agency devoted exclusively to combating liver diseases until 1976, when the American Liver Foundation was created by the American Association for the Study of Liver Diseases (AASLD). This organization of scientists and healthcare professionals was concerned with the rising incidence of liver disease and the lack of awareness among both the general public and the medical community. The mission, the programs and the services provided by American Liver Foundation complement the work of AASLD.

Currently, the American Liver Foundation has 16 Divisions across the U.S.

== ALF Education Programs ==
The liver is poorly understood by many, so when a diagnosis of liver disease is made, it can be frightening and confusing for many patients and their families.

Education has been demonstrated to help maintain liver health and prevent liver disease. Many forms of liver disease are preventable, and many more can be cured if detected early yet many cases remain undiagnosed For this reason, ALF implements extensive educational and preventative efforts

== ALF Research Awards ==
Research is integral to the work of the American Liver Foundation and is essential to improving, treating and finding a cure for liver disease. Since 1979, the Research Awards Program has provided more than $26 million in research funding. Over 850 qualified scientists and physicians have pursued careers in liver disease research and treatment as a result of receiving these grants early in their careers.
