= Metabolic dysfunction–associated steatotic liver disease =

Excessive fat buildup in the liver with other metabolic disease

- Other names: MASLD, Non-alcoholic fatty liver disease (NAFLD), Metabolic (dysfunction) associated fatty liver disease (MAFLD)
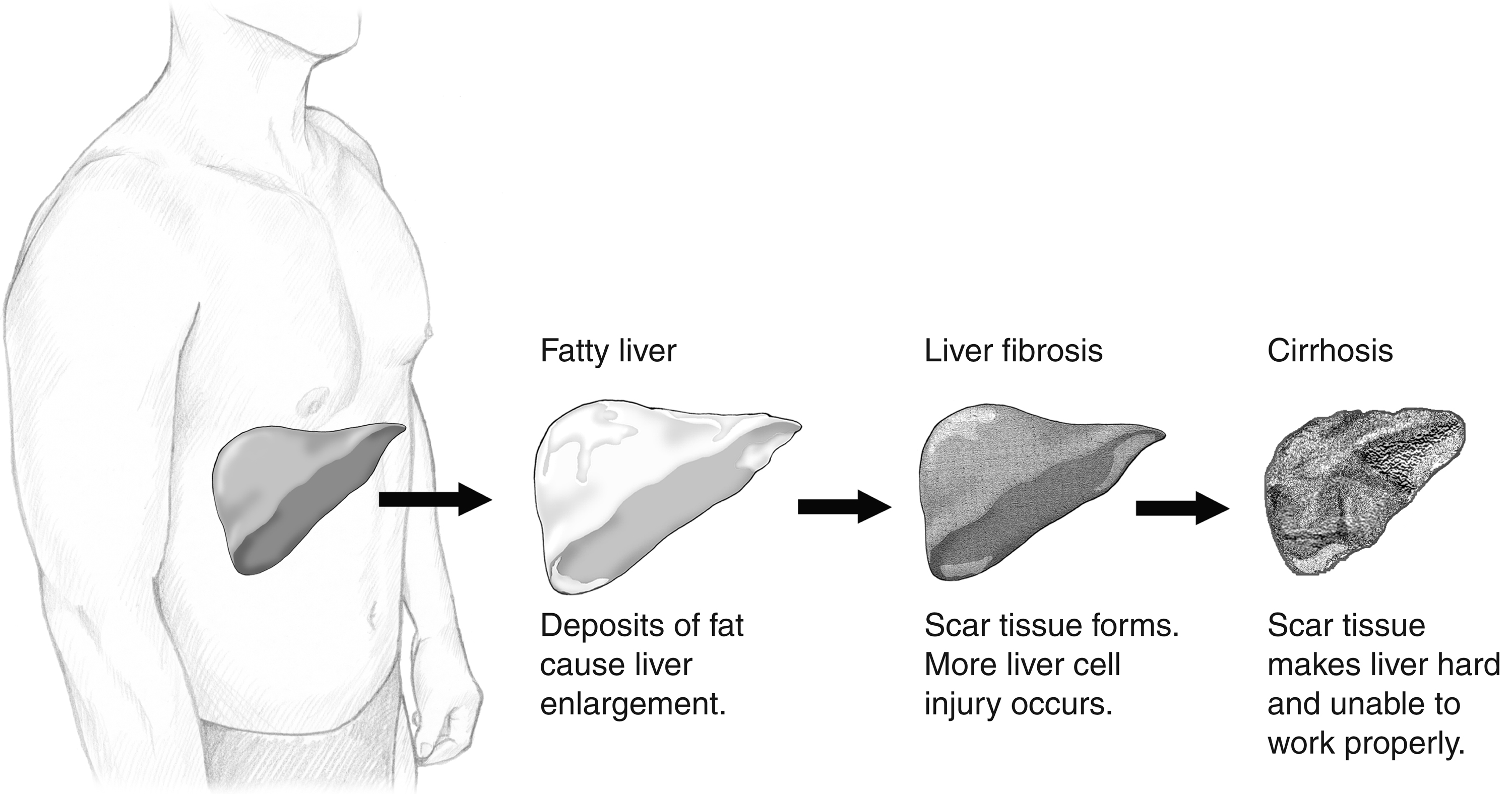
- Stages of metabolic dysfunction–associated steatotic liver disease, progressing from healthy, to steatosis (fat accumulation), inflammation, fibrosis and cirrhosis.
- Specialty: Hepatology
- Symptoms: Asymptomatic in the early stages In later stages: * Deposits of cholesterol on the eye lids * Fatigue * Crusty red nodules * Digestive issues Lastly causes liver disease and eventually liver failure
- Complications: Cirrhosis, liver cancer, liver failure, cardiovascular disease
- Duration: Long term
- Types: Metabolic dysfunction–associated steatotic liver (MASL), Metabolic dysfunction-associated steatohepatitis (MASH)
- Causes: Genetic, environmental, malnutrition, sedentary lifestyle
- Risk factors: Obesity, metabolic syndrome, type 2 diabetes mellitus, liver disease
- Diagnostic method: Ultrasound, Coexisting metabolic disorders, Liver biopsy
- Treatment: Weight loss (in case of obesity); Dietary reduction of fructose and glucose (diet and exercise)
- Prognosis: Depends on type
- Frequency: 24% in the worldwide population, 80% in people with obesity, 20% in normal-weight people
- Deaths: MASH: 2.6% risk of death per year MAFL: Unknown

Metabolic dysfunction–associated steatotic liver disease (MASLD), previously known as non-alcoholic fatty liver disease (NAFLD), (Note: In 2023, a global consensus panel composed mostly of hepatology researchers and clinicians recommended a change of name to metabolic dysfunction–associated steatotic liver disease. The term metabolic (dysfunction) associated fatty liver disease (MAFLD) has also been used. The umbrella term steatotic liver disease covers MASLD, alcohol-associated liver disease (ALD) and MetALD, a term describing people with MASLD who consume between 140 grams and 350 grams of alcohol per week for women and 210 grams and 420 grams per week for men (intermediate between MASLD and ALD).) is a type of chronic liver disease. This condition is diagnosed when there is excessive fat build-up in the liver (hepatic steatosis), and at least one metabolic risk factor. When there is also increased alcohol intake, the term MetALD, or metabolic dysfunction and alcohol associated/related liver disease is used, and differentiated from alcohol-related liver disease (ALD) where alcohol is the predominant cause of the steatotic liver disease. The terms non-alcoholic fatty liver (NAFL) and non-alcoholic steatohepatitis (NASH, now known as metabolic dysfunction associated steatohepatitis, MASH) have been used to describe different severities, the latter indicating the presence of further liver inflammation. MASLD may progress to MASH, with the risk of progression estimated as 7–35% per year. MASH may also regress to MASLD, especially with a healthy diet, exercise, and medications. Both MASLD and MASH have liver related complications such as cirrhosis, liver cancer, liver failure, as well as liver independent complications such as cardiovascular disease. These complications are much more common with MASH.

Obesity and type 2 diabetes are strong risk factors for MASLD. Other risks include being overweight, metabolic syndrome (defined as at least three of the five following medical conditions: abdominal obesity, high blood pressure, high blood sugar, high serum triglycerides, and low serum HDL cholesterol), a diet high in fructose, and older age. Obtaining a sample of the liver after excluding other potential causes of fatty liver can confirm the diagnosis.

Treatment for MASLD is weight loss by dietary changes and exercise; bariatric surgery can improve or resolve severe cases. There is some evidence for SGLT-2 inhibitors, GLP-1 agonists, pioglitazone, and vitamin E in the treatment of MASLD. In March 2024, resmetirom was the first drug approved by the FDA for MASH. Approval in the EU followed in August 2025. Those with MASH have a 2.6% increased risk of dying per year.

MASLD is the most common liver disorder in the world; about 25–38% of people have it, and the prevalence is rising. It is very common in developed nations, such as the United States, and affected about 75 to 100 million Americans in 2017. Over 90% of obese, 60% of diabetic, and up to 20% of normal-weight people develop MASLD. MASLD was the leading cause of chronic liver disease and the second most common reason for liver transplantation in the United States and Europe in 2017. MASLD affects about 20 to 25% of people in Europe. In the United States, estimates suggest that 30% to 40% of adults have MASLD, and about 3% to 12% of adults have MASH. The annual economic burden was about US$103 billion in the United States in 2016.

== Classification ==
MASLD diagnostic criteria chart according to new fatty liver disease nomenclature

Cardiometabolic risk factors in relation to MASLD

As of 2023, steatotic liver disease (SLD) has been chosen as an umbrella term encompassing different disease subcategories that begin with fatty accumulation (hepatic steatosis) in more than 5% of hepatocytes. When at least one metabolic risk factor is present, the condition is termed metabolic dysfunction–associated steatotic liver disease (MASLD). If there is also increased alcohol intake, the term MetALD (metabolic dysfunction and alcohol-related liver disease) is used. This is differentiated from alcohol-related liver disease (ALD), in which alcohol is the predominant cause of the steatotic liver disease. MASLD is thus distinguished from other causes (etiologies) such as cryptogenic SLD, drug-induced liver injury (DILI), and monogenic diseases.

By various mechanisms and possible insults to the liver, SLD may progress to steatohepatitis (MASH), a state in which steatosis is combined with inflammation and sometimes fibrosis. MASH can then lead to complications such as cirrhosis and hepatocellular carcinoma.

== Signs and symptoms ==
Overview of non-alcoholic fatty liver disease

People with MASLD often have no noticeable symptoms, and it is often only detected during routine blood tests or unrelated abdominal imaging or liver biopsy. In some cases, it can cause symptoms related to liver dysfunction such as fatigue, malaise, and dull right-upper-quadrant abdominal discomfort. Mild yellow discoloration of the skin may occur, although this is rare. MASH can severely impair liver function, leading to cirrhosis, liver failure, and liver cancer.

=== Comorbidities ===
The condition is strongly associated with or caused by type 2 diabetes, insulin resistance, and metabolic syndrome (defined as at least three of the five following medical conditions: abdominal obesity, high blood pressure, high blood sugar, high serum triglycerides, and low serum high-density lipoprotein). It is also associated with:

- Hormonal disorders (panhypopituitarism, hypothyroidism, hypogonadism, polyendocrine metabolic ovarian syndrome (PMOS))
- Persistently elevated transaminases,
- Increasing age
- Hypoxia caused by obstructive sleep apnea

Some of these conditions predict disease progression.

Most normal-weight people with MASLD ("lean MASLD") have impaired insulin sensitivity, are sedentary, and have increased cardiovascular disease risk and increased liver lipid levels. These are the consequences of a decreased capacity for storing fat and reduced mitochondrial function in fat and increased hepatic de novo lipogenesis. A recent systematic review reported an increased risk of severe COVID-19 infection in MASLD patients, but no difference in mortality was observed between MASLD and non-MASLD patients.

== Risk factors ==
=== Hypothesis of genetic and multiple sources for pathogenesis ===
The two-hit hypothesis of cancer formation has been applied to MASLD , where the disorder may be caused by both a genetic predisposition and two separate and distinct triggering events. However, published medical research describes this as obsolete for MASLD applications as well to not have been determined. The hypothesis of "multiple hit" hypothesis (multiple risk factors as the cause) is considered to be a more accurate depict the pathogenesis of MASLD for those who are genetically predisposed to the disease.

=== Genetics ===
Two-thirds of families with a history of type 2 diabetes report more than one family member having MASLD. There is a higher risk of fibrosis for family members where someone was diagnosed with MASH. Asian populations are more susceptible to metabolic syndrome and MASLD than their Western counterparts. Hispanic persons have a higher prevalence of MASLD than white individuals, whereas the lowest prevalence is observed in black individuals. MASLD is twice as prevalent in men as in women, which might be explained by lower levels of estrogen in men.

Genetic variations in two genes are associated with MASLD: non-synonymous single-nucleotide polymorphisms (SNPs) in PNPLA3 and TM6SF2. Both correlate with MASLD presence and severity, but their roles for diagnosis remain unclear. Although MASLD has a genetic component, the American Association for the Study of Liver Diseases (AASLD) does not recommend screening family members as there is not enough confirmation of heritability, although there is some evidence from familial aggregation and twin studies.

=== From diet ===
According to the Asia-Pacific Working Group (APWG) on MASLD, overnutrition is a major factor of MASLD and MASH, particularly for lean MASLD. Diet composition and quantity, in particular omega-6 fatty acid and fructose, have important roles in disease progression from MASL to MASH and fibrosis. Choline deficiency can lead to the development of MASLD.

Higher consumption of processed, red, and organ meats have been associated with higher risk of developing MASLD. Some research also suggests eggs are also associated with developing MASLD. On the other hand, studies have found healthful plant foods such as legumes and nuts, to be associated with a lower risk of developing MASLD. Two different studies have found healthy plant-based diets rich in healthy plant foods and low in animal foods to be associated with a lower risk of developing MASLD, even after adjusting for BMI.

=== Snoring ===
Habitual snoring may be a risk factor for MASLD. Severe snoring often signals the presence of obstructive sleep apnea (OSA), a much more serious breathing condition. Blockage or narrowing of the airways, even temporarily, can cause the body to experience lowered oxygen levels in the blood. This, in turn, may cause a variety of changes within the body, such as tissue inflammation, increased insulin resistance, and liver injury. A prospective cohort study found the association between habitual snoring and MASLD development to be significant, and the trend was noted to be most prominent in lean individuals.

=== Estrogen and menopause ===
The liver is responsive to estrogen. Animal models of estrogen deficiency accumulate liver fat as well as inflammation and fibrosis. The protective effect of estrogen is the usual explanation to why women have a much lower incidence of MASLD than men, before menopause. On the other hand, women with an earlier age at menopause are at increased risk for MASLD, and post-menopausal women with MASLD are at greater risk to develop severe fibrosis. Studies of various forms of menopausal hormone replacement therapy as potential treatment for MASLD, have yielded conflicting results.

== Pathophysiology ==
The primary characteristic of MASLD is the accumulation of lipids in the liver, largely in the form of triglycerides. However, the mechanisms by which triglycerides accumulate and the reasons that accumulation can lead to liver dysfunction are complex and incompletely understood. MASLD can include steatosis along with varied signs of liver injury: either lobular or portal inflammation (a form of liver injury) or ballooning degeneration. Similarly, MASH can include histological features such as portal inflammation, polymorphonuclear cell infiltrates, Mallory bodies, apoptotic bodies, clear vacuolated nuclei, microvesicular steatosis, megamitochondria, and perisinusoidal fibrosis. Hepatocyte death via apoptosis or necroptosis is increased in MASH compared with simple steatosis, and inflammation is a hallmark of MASH. The degree of inflammation can be correlated to the number of inflammatory foci. Various definitions exist for an inflammatory focus, but one defines it as the presence of more than four mononuclear cells in proximity within the hepatic parenchyma.

One debated mechanism proposes that hepatic steatosis progresses to steatosis with inflammation following some further injury, or second hit. Oxidative stress, hormonal imbalances, and mitochondrial abnormalities are potential causes of this "second hit" phenomenon. A further nutrigenomics model named multiple hit extends the second hit model, suggesting that multiple disease biomarkers and factors such as genes and nutrition influence MASLD and MASH progression. This model attempts to use these factors to predict the impact of lifestyle changes and genetics for the evolution of the MASLD pathology. Many researchers describe MASLD as a multisystem disease, as it impacts and is influenced by organs and regulatory pathways other than the liver.

The accumulation of senescent cells in the liver is seen in persons with MASLD. In mice, liver senescent hepatocytes result in increased liver fat deposition. Treatment of MASLD mice with senolytic agents has been shown to reduce hepatic steatosis.

Based on gene knockout studies in murine models, it has been suggested that, among many other pathogenic factors, TGF beta signals may be crucially involved in promoting the progression of MASH.

=== Fructose consumption ===
Non-alcoholic and alcoholic fatty liver disease share similar histological features, which suggests that they might share common pathogenic pathways. In laboratory research, high fructose levels promote fat accumulation in the liver by stimulating de novo lipogenesis and reducing the beta-oxidation of fat. Unlike the sugar glucose, the enzyme fructokinase rapidly metabolizes fructose. This leads to a decreased level of intracellular adenosine triphosphate (ATP). The decrease in ATP increases oxidative stress and impairments in proper protein synthesis and mitochondrial function in the liver.

=== Insulin resistance ===
Insulin resistance contributes to the accumulation of toxic fat in the liver in several ways. First, it promotes the release of free fatty acids (FFAs) from adipose tissue into the blood. Typically, adipose tissue stores lipids in the form of triglycerides, slowly releasing them into the bloodstream when insulin is low. In insulin-resistant adipose tissue, such as in people with obesity and type 2 diabetes, more triglycerides are broken down into FFAs and released into the bloodstream, promoting uptake by the liver. Second, insulin promotes the production of new FFAs in the liver via de novo lipogenesis; this production of liver fats continues to be stimulated by insulin, even when other tissues are insulin-resistant. These FFAs are combined back into triglycerides in the liver, forming the major constituent of the accumulated fat in the liver. The three sources of free fatty acids that contribute to liver triglyceride accumulation include FFAs circulating in the bloodstream (59%), FFAs derived from carbohydrates such as fructose and glucose (26%), and diet (14%). Despite the accumulation of triglycerides in the liver, they are not directly toxic to liver tissue. Instead, alteration of the profile of the other lipid subtypes present in the liver, such as diacylglycerols, phospholipids, ceramides, and free cholesterol, has a more significant role in the pathogenesis of MASLD.

Once MASLD progresses in severity to the point of MASH, this promotes further insulin resistance in the adipose tissue and liver, which results in a harmful cycle of insulin resistance, liver fat accumulation, and inflammation. Adipose tissue dysfunction also decreases secretion of the insulin-sensitizing adipokine adiponectin in people with MASLD. Adiponectin has several properties that protect the liver. These properties include improved liver fat metabolism, decreased de novo lipogenesis, decreased glucose production in the liver, anti-inflammatory properties, and anti-fibrotic properties. Skeletal muscle insulin resistance may also play a role in MASLD. Insulin-resistant skeletal muscle is not as efficient at taking up glucose from the bloodstream after a meal. This inefficient glucose uptake promotes the redistribution of consumed carbohydrates from glucose destined for use in glycogen stores in the skeletal muscles to being used as a substrate for de novo lipogenesis in the liver.

=== Dysbiosis ===
Disruptions in the intestinal microbiota seem to influence MASLD risk in several ways. People with MASH can have elevated levels of blood ethanol and Pseudomonadota (which produce alcohol), with dysbiosis proposed as a mechanism for this elevation. Alterations in the composition of the intestinal microbiota may influence MASLD risk in several ways. These changes appear to increase the permeability of intestinal tissue, thereby facilitating increased liver exposure to harmful substances (e.g., translocated bacteria, bacterial toxins, and inflammatory chemical signals). The increased transport of these harmful substances to the liver promotes liver inflammation, enhances nutrient and calorie absorption, and alters choline metabolism. Higher levels of intestinal bacteria that produce butyrate may be protective.

Excessive macronutrient intake contributes to gut inflammation and perturbation of homeostasis, and micronutrients may also be involved. In addition to reducing weight and risk factors, lifestyle changes may prompt positive changes in the gut microbiota. In particular, diet diversity may play a role that was overlooked in animal studies, since they often compare a Western high-fat, low-diversity diet against a low-fat but higher-diversity chow. The health benefits after bariatric surgery may also involve changes in the gut microbiota by increasing gut permeablity.

== Gallery ==
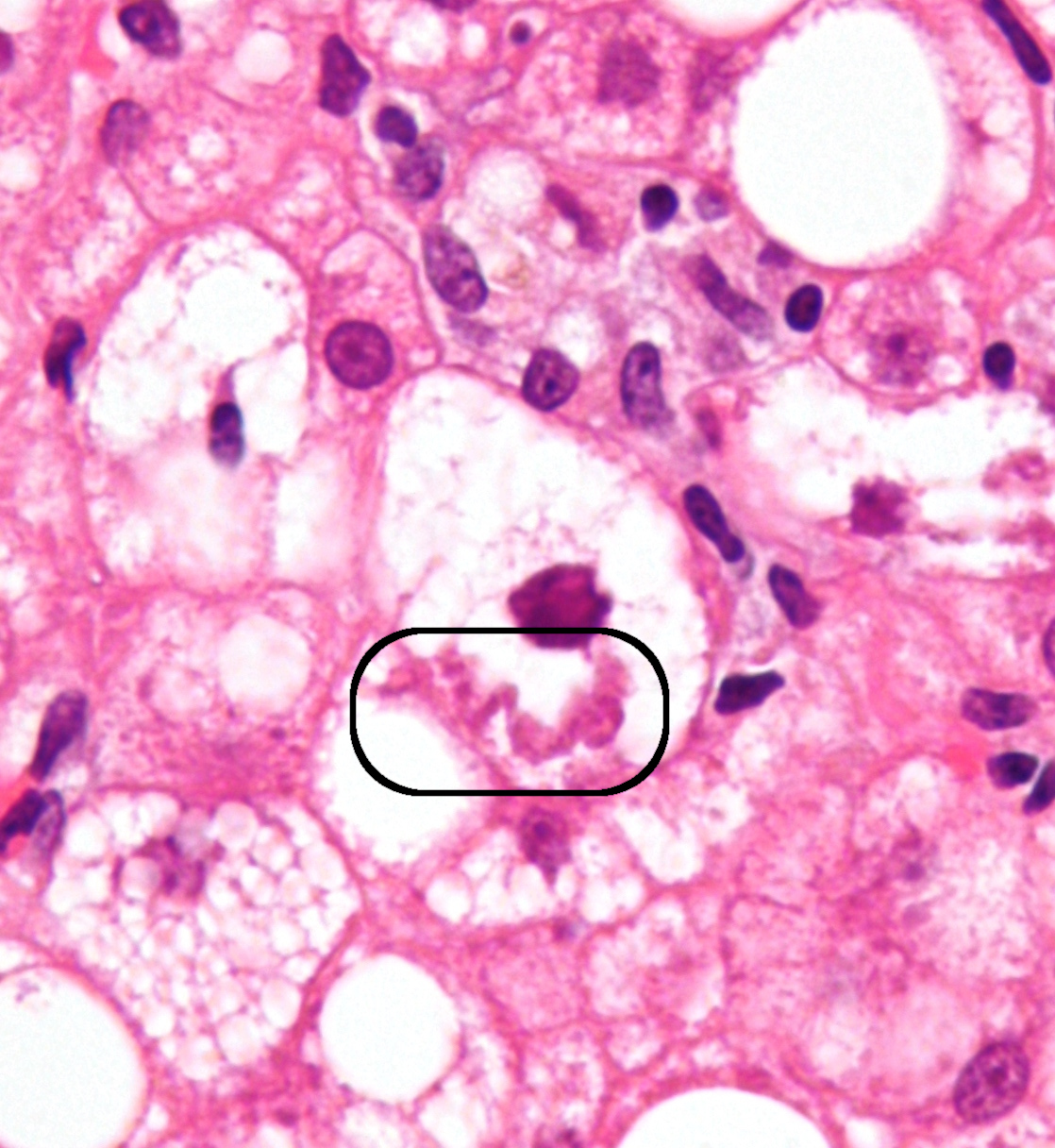
Mallory-Denk body

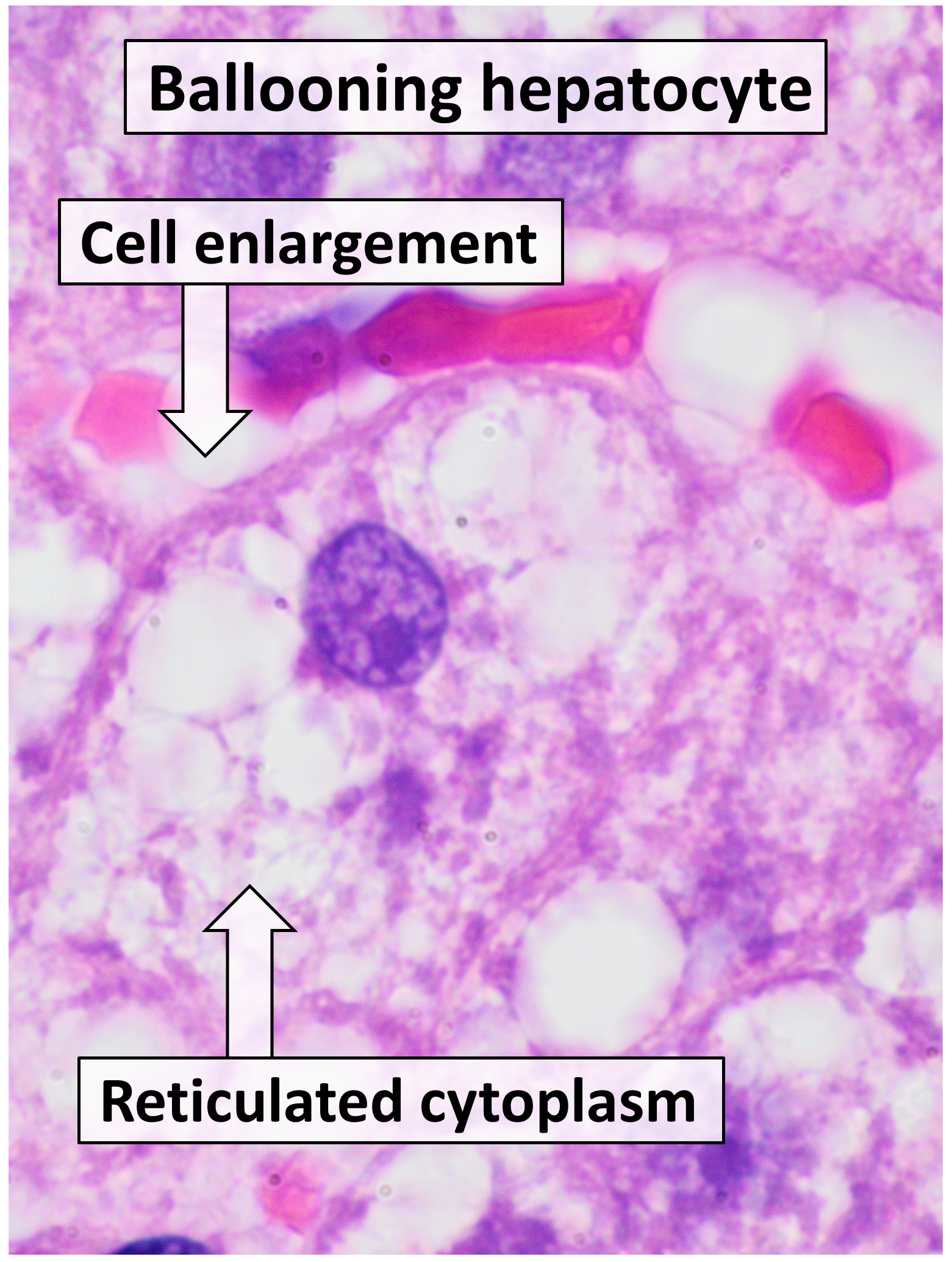
Ballooning degeneration

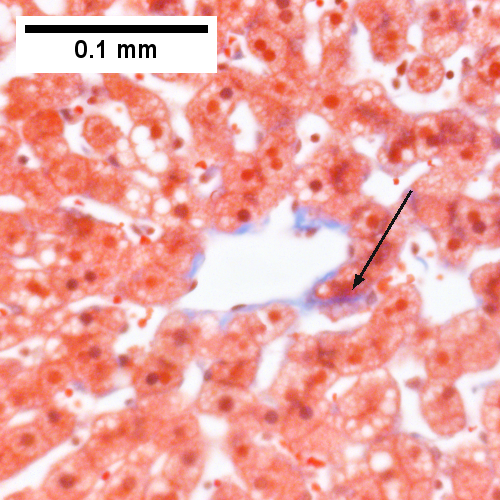
MASH (inflammation) and fibrosis stage 1

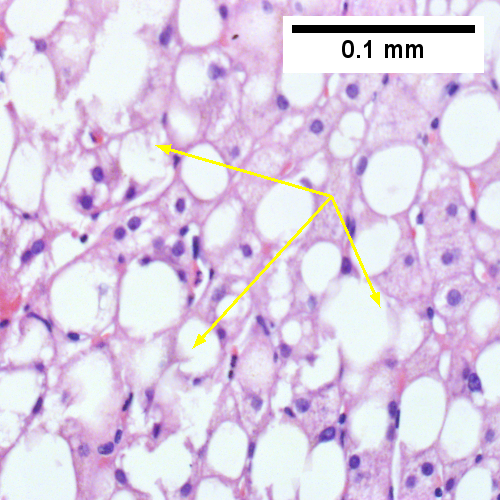
MASH (inflammation) and fibrosis stage 2

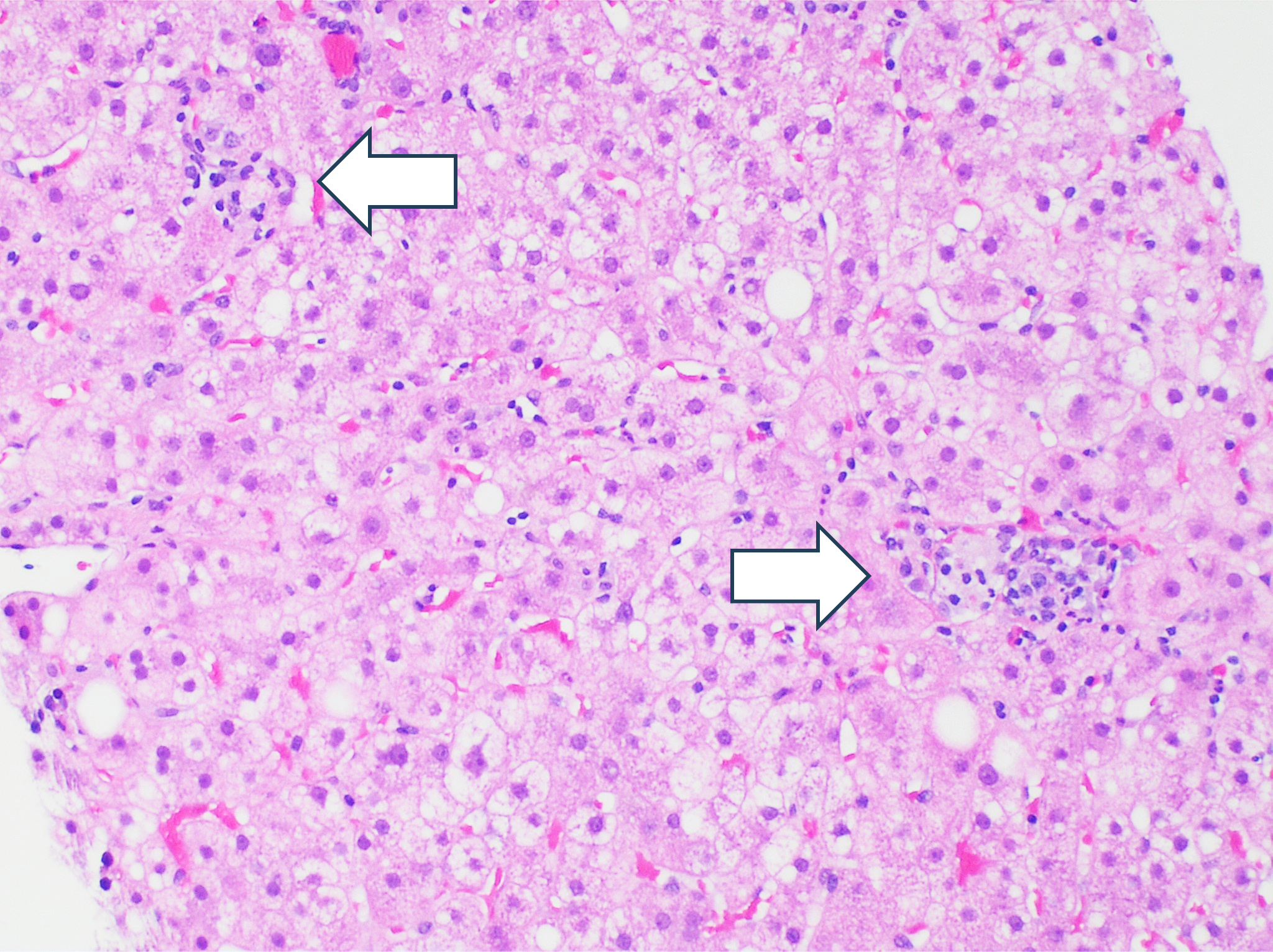
Two foci of lobular inflammation.

== Diagnosis ==
Stages of progression of Metabolic dysfunction–associated steatotic liver disease

MASLD was defined by the presence of excess fat in the liver that cannot be explained by another factor, such as excessive alcohol use (>21 standard drinks/week for men and >14 for women in the USA; >30 g daily for men and >20 g for women in UK and EU, >140 g/week for men and >70 g/week for women in Asia-Pacific), liver injury caused by drugs or toxins or viruses, nutritional deficiency, or endocrine conditions. In practice, diagnosis was often made based on the clinical presentation and a lack of high-volume alcohol consumption reported by the patient, but this is an unreliable method of diagnosis.

The presence of at least 5% fatty liver is common to both MASLD and MASH. Substantial lobular inflammation and hepatocyte injuries, such as ballooning or Mallory hyaline, only occur in MASH. The majority of MASLD cases show minimal or no inflammation. Pericentral and perisinusoidal fibrosis occur more often in adult-onset MASH, whereas portal fibrosis is more common in children with the disorder. MASH represents a more advanced stage of MASLD and is associated with poorer outcomes such as cardiovascular events, cirrhosis, or hepatocellular carcinoma.

=== Blood tests ===
Liver function tests may be abnormal, but they often remain within the normal range even in advanced disease. Other blood tests that may be useful to confirm the diagnosis include erythrocyte sedimentation rate, serum glucose, and albumin. Because the liver is important for making proteins used in blood clotting, coagulation-related studies are often carried out, especially the prothrombin time. In people with fatty liver with associated inflammatory injury (steatohepatitis), blood tests are usually used to rule out certain types of viral hepatitis and autoimmune diseases. Low thyroid activity is more prevalent in people with MASH, which would be detected by determining the thyroid-stimulating hormone.

Although blood tests cannot diagnose MASLD, circulating serum biomarkers of liver fibrosis can provide moderate estimates in the diagnosis of liver fibrosis and cirrhosis. The ratio of the transaminase liver enzyme aspartate aminotransferase (AST) to platelets in the blood, known as the AST/platelet ratio index (APRI score) and Fibrotest are recommended as the preferred noninvasive tests for cirrhosis by the Asian-Pacific Association for Study of the Liver (APASL). Several other scores such as FIB-4 score and MASFLD fibrosis score can also reflect the burden of the fibrosis in the liver, and previous studies have confirmed that these scores can predict future development of mortality and liver cancer. Future work is being performed to understand better identify plasma biomarkers that more closely reflect MASLD and MASH livers.

=== Imaging ===
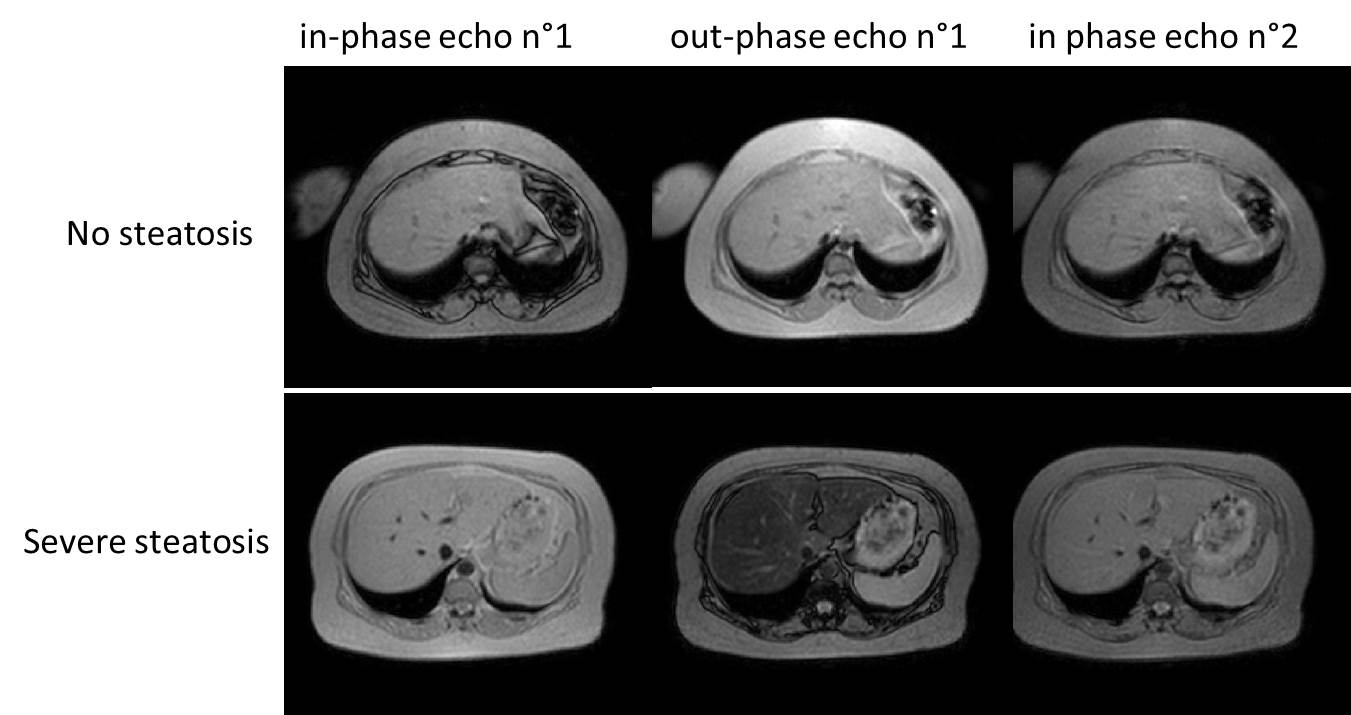
MRI of a healthy liver (top row) and one with severe steatosis (bottom row)

A liver ultrasound scan or magnetic resonance imaging (MRI) can diagnose steatosis, but not fibrosis, and confirmation of early cirrhosis detection by ultrasound by other diagnostic methods is recommended. The European Association for the Study of the Liver (EASL) recommends screening for steatosis whenever MASFLD is suspected as this is a strong predictor of the disease evolution and predicts future type 2 diabetes, cardiovascular events, and hypertension. These non-invasive methods can be used for MASFLD screening but are not accepted as a substitute for liver biopsy in MASFLD nor MASH clinical trials, as only a liver biopsy can define liver pathology.

Ultrasound elastography is an effective tool for staging liver fibrosis and discriminating MASH in children and adults.

Computerized tomography and magnetic resonance imaging are more accurate in detecting cirrhosis than conventional ultrasound.

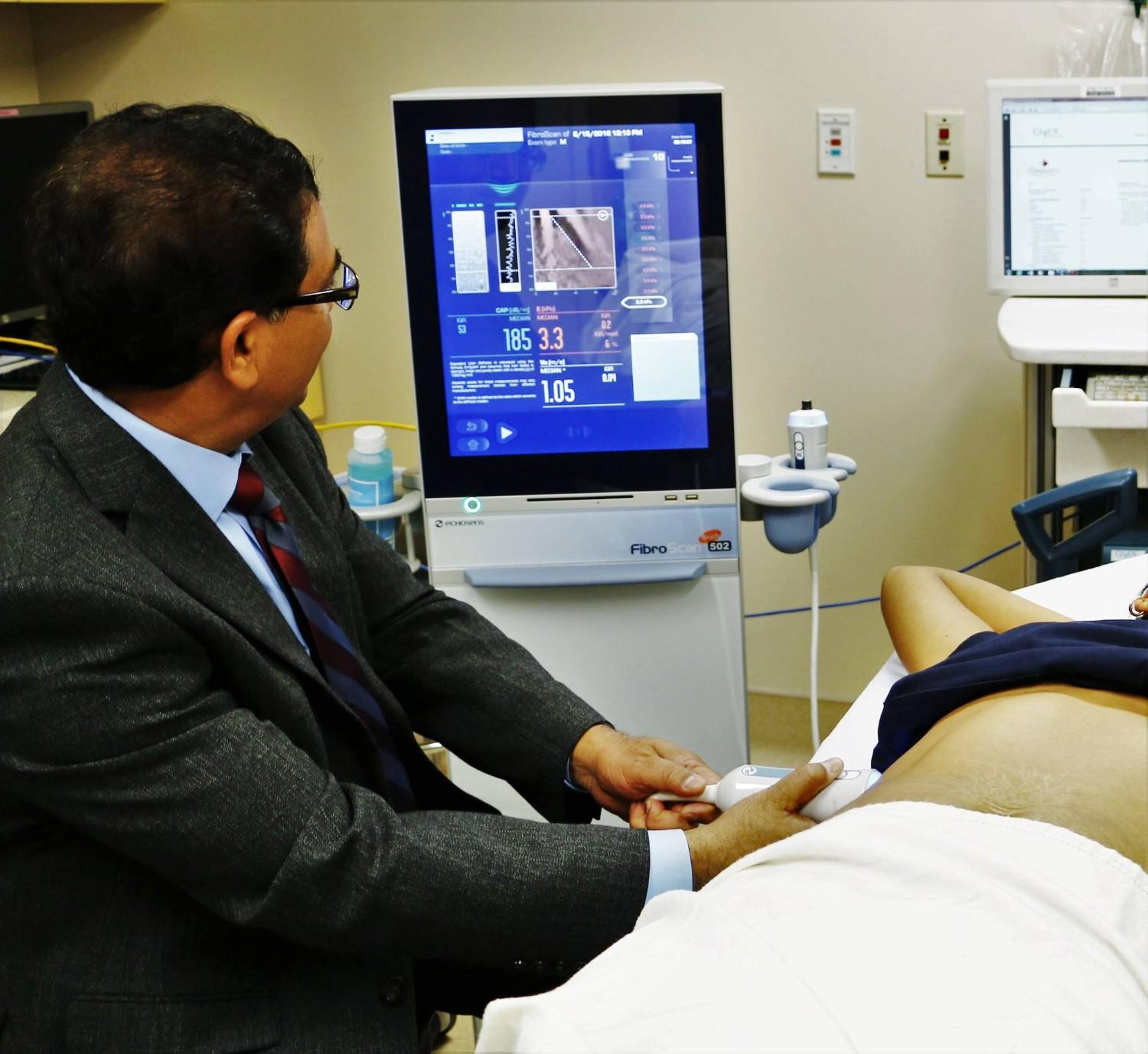
A Transient Elastography (FibroScan) readout. The Controlled Attenuation Parameter (CAP) measures steatosis (fatty change), while the Liver Stiffness Measurement (LSM) assesses the severity of hepatic fibrosis.

Transient elastography is recommended for the initial assessment of liver fibrosis and cirrhosis and helps to predict complications and prognosis, evaluation of transient elastography with the controlled attenuation parameter for the diagnosis of steatosis and fibrosis in patients with nonalcoholic fatty liver disease but the interpretation of results is carefully weighed in the presence of limiting factors such as steatosis, high BMI, low amount of hepatic fibrosis, narrow spaces between the ribs, and portal hypertension. Transient elastography is not a substitute for liver biopsy.

Magnetic resonance elastography (MRE) is an established method that can accurately assess hepatic fibrosis and is recommended by the APASL, AGA, ACR and AASLD. MRE possesses excellent accuracy to detect fibrosis in MASFLD regardless of BMI and inflammation, and is suggested as a more reliable alternative to diagnose MASFLD and its progression to MASH compared to ultrasound and blood tests.

=== Liver biopsy ===
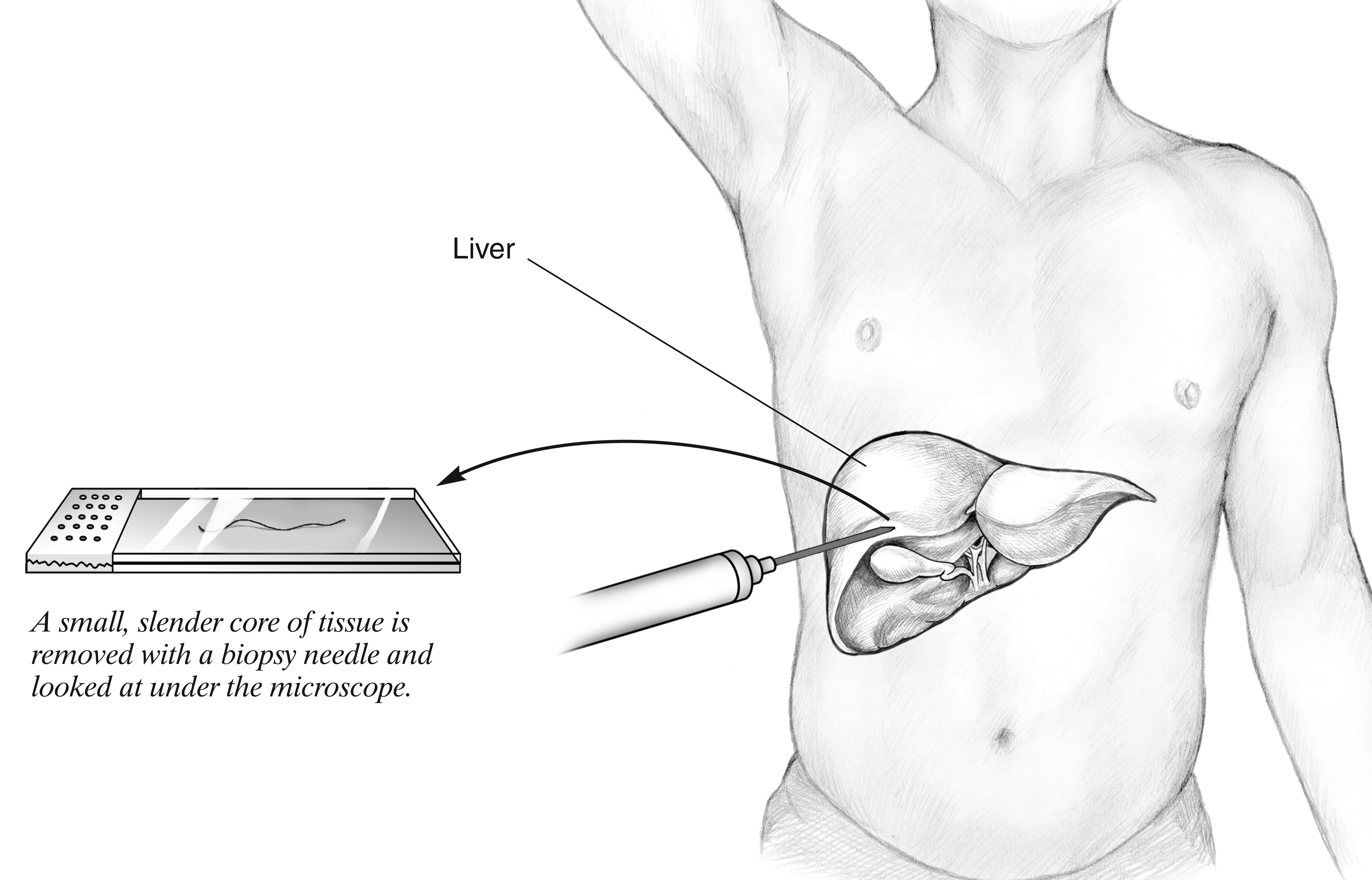
A small quantity of tissue is sampled from the liver when doing a biopsy, which is then examined under a microscope

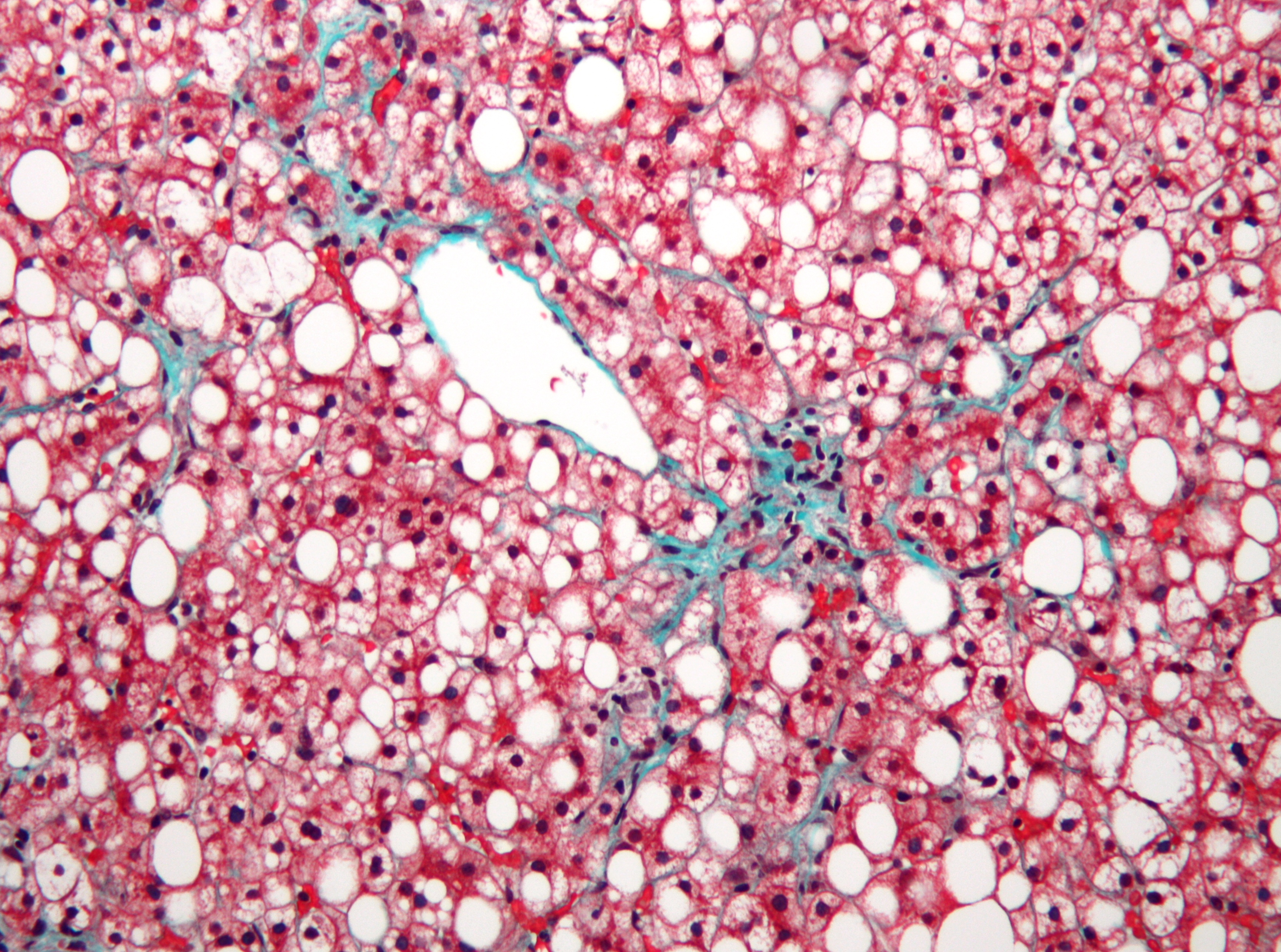
Micrograph of non-alcoholic fatty liver disease, demonstrating marked steatosis (fat in liver cells appears white; connective tissue, blue). Trichrome stain

A liver biopsy (tissue examination) is the only test widely accepted (gold standard) as definitively diagnosing and distinguishing MASLD and MASH from other forms of liver disease. It can be used to assess the severity of inflammation and resultant fibrosis. However, since most people affected by MASLD are likely to be asymptomatic, liver biopsy presents too high a risk for routine diagnosis, so other methods are preferred, such as liver ultrasonography or liver MRI. For young people, guidelines recommend liver ultrasonography, but biopsy remains the best evidence. Liver biopsy is also the gold standard to detect hepatic fibrosis and assess its progression. Routine liver function blood tests are not sensitive enough to detect MASLD, and biopsy is the only procedure that can reliably differentiate MASLD from MASH.

There are several liver biopsy techniques available to obtain liver tissue. Percutaneous liver biopsy remains the most common practice. Biopsies can also be performed via the transvenous route, either during surgery or by laparoscopy, especially for people with contraindications to a percutaneous approach. The liver biopsy can also be image-guided, in real-time or not, which is recommended for some clinical situations, such as people with known liver lesions, previous intra-abdominal surgery who may have adhesions, a small liver that is difficult to percuss, people with obesity, and people with evident ascites.

MASFLD Activity Score (NAS)
	score			
	0	1	2	3
Steatosis	<5%	5–33%	>33–66%	>66%
Lobular inflammation	None	<2 foci	2–4 foci	>4 foci
Hepatocyte ballooning	None	Few	Many/prominent	

According to AASLD guidelines, a liver biopsy may be considered in people with MASLD who are at increased risk of having steatohepatitis with or without advanced fibrosis, but only when all other competing chronic liver diseases are excluded (such as alcoholic liver disease). The presence of metabolic syndrome, MASLD Fibrosis Score (FIB-4), or liver stiffness (as measured by Vibration-controlled transient elastography or MRE) can identify individuals who are at higher risk of steatohepatitis or advanced fibrosis.

== Management ==
MASLD warrants treatment regardless of whether the affected person is overweight. MASLD is a preventable cause of death. Guidelines are available from the American Association for the Study of Liver Diseases (AASLD), American Association of Clinical Endocrinologists (AACE) National Institute for Health and Care Excellence (NICE), the European Association for the Study of the Liver (EASL), and the Asia-Pacific Working Party on MASFLD.

=== Lifestyle ===
Weight loss is the most effective treatment for MASLD and MASH. A loss of 5% to 10% body weight is recommended and has shown regression of liver damage, with 10% to 40% weight loss completely reversing MASH without cirrhosis. A weight loss of greater than 10% was associated with the resolution of MASH in 90% of people in a biopsy-based study. A structured weight loss program helps people with MASLD lose more weight compared with advice alone. This type of program also leads to improvements in MASLD measured by blood tests, ultrasound, imaging, or liver biopsies. Although fibrosis improves with lifestyle interventions and weight loss, there is limited evidence for improvement in cirrhosis.

A combination of improved diet and exercise, rather than either alone, appears to help manage MASFLD and reduce insulin resistance. Motivational support, such as with cognitive behavioral therapy, is helpful, as most people with MASLD do not perceive their condition as a disease, and thus have a low motivation to change.

Higher-intensity behavioral weight loss therapies (diet and exercise combined) may produce greater weight loss than lower-intensity ones. A 2019 systematic review suggested updating the guidelines to recommend these therapies for MASLD management. Weight loss is associated with improvements in biomarkers, MASLD severity, and a lower risk of MASH, but its effect on long-term health is not known.

2021 meta-analyses of trials over periods of 1 to 28 months found limited evidence to indicate that lifestyle modifications and nutritional supplementation affect mortality, liver cirrhosis, liver decompensation, liver transplantation, and hepatocellular carcinoma in people with non-alcohol-related fatty liver disease; authors said that it was unlikely that differences in clinical outcomes would become apparent in trials with less than 5 years to 10 years of follow‐up, and that sample sizes needed to be much larger than had been used.

=== Diet ===
Treatment of MASFLD typically involves counseling to improve nutrition and calorie restriction. People with MASFLD can benefit from a moderate to low-carbohydrate diet and a low-fat diet. The Mediterranean diet also showed promising results in a 6-week study with a reduction of MASH induced inflammation and fibrosis, independently from weight loss. Tentative evidence supports dietary interventions in individuals with fatty liver who are not overweight.

The EASL recommends energy restriction of 500–1000 kcal per week less than the normal daily diet, a target of 7–10% weight loss for obese/overweight MASLD, a low- to moderate-fat, and moderate- to high-carbohydrate diet, or a low-carbohydrate ketogenic or high-protein diet such as the Mediterranean diet, and avoiding all beverages and food containing fructose.

Alcohol is an aggravating factor, and the AASLD recommends that people with MASFLD or MASH avoid alcohol consumption. The EASL allows alcohol consumption below 30g/day for men and 20g/day for women. The role of coffee consumption for MASFLD treatment is unclear. Some studies indicate that regular coffee consumption may have protective effects.

Studies suggest an association between microscopic organisms that inhabit the gut (microbiota) and MASLD. Reviews reported that the use of probiotics and synbiotics (combinations of probiotics and prebiotics) was associated with improvement in liver-specific markers of hepatic inflammation, measurements of liver stiffness, and steatosis in persons with MASLD.

Vitamin E does not improve established liver fibrosis in those with MASLD, but seems to improve certain markers of liver function and reduce inflammation and fattiness of the liver in some people with MASLD. The Asia-Pacific Work Group advises that Vitamin E may improve liver condition and aminotransferase levels, but only in adults without diabetes or cirrhosis who have MASH. The NICE guidelines recommend Vitamin E as an option for children and adults with MASFLD with advanced liver fibrosis, regardless of whether the person has diabetes mellitus.

=== Physical activity ===
Weight loss may improve MASLD and is recommended particularly for obese or overweight people; similar physical activities and diets are advisable for overweight people with MASLD as for other obese and overweight people. Although physical activity is less important for weight loss than dietary adaptations (to reduce caloric intake), the NICE advises physical activity to reduce liver fat even if there is no overall bodyweight reduction. Weight loss, through exercise or diet, is the most effective way to reduce liver fat and help MASH and fibrosis remission. Exercise alone can prevent or reduce hepatic steatosis, but it remains unknown whether it can improve all other aspects of the liver; hence a combined approach with diet and exercise is advised. Aerobic exercise may be more effective than resistance training, although there are contradictory results. Vigorous training is preferable to moderate training, as only the high-intensity exercise reduced the chances of MASLD developing into MASH or advanced fibrosis. The EASL recommends between 150 and 200 min/week in 3 to 5 sessions of moderate-intensity aerobic physical activity or resistance training. Since both effectively reduce liver fat, a pragmatic approach to physical activity that accounts for the individual's preferences for a sustainable physical activity that they can maintain long-term is preferred. Any increase in physical activity over previous levels is better than remaining sedentary.

=== Medication ===
Treatment with medications is primarily aimed at improving liver disease and is generally limited to those with biopsy-proven MASH and fibrosis.

Fenofibrate remains one of the most effective medicines in reducing serum triglyceride levels in people living with MASLD, commonly seen in people with obesity and/or diabetes. In a meta-analysis of data from five randomized controlled trials, fenofibrate was found to be safe for use in people with MASLD. It was superior to atorvastatin, omega-3 fatty acids, and pioglitazone in reducing serum triglycerides.

Insulin sensitizers (metformin and thiazolidinediones, such as pioglitazone) are not specifically recommended for MASLD as they do not directly improve the liver condition. They can be indicated for diabetic individuals, after careful assessment of risks, to reduce insulin resistance and the risks of complications. Indeed, the side effects associated with thiazolidinedione medications, which include osteopenia, increased fracture risk, fluid retention, congestive heart failure, bladder cancer, and long-term weight gain, have limited their adoption. Due to these side effects, the AASLD recommends the use of pioglitazone only for individuals with biopsy-proven MASH, and the Asia-Pacific Work Group recommends them only for individuals with MASLD with known diabetic issues. However, the AASLD advises against the use of metformin, as studies were inconclusive regarding whether it improves liver histology. Although there was an improvement in insulin resistance and serum aminotransferases, this did not translate into MASH improvements. The NICE provides similar guidelines to the AASLD regarding pioglitazone and recommends it be administered in secondary care to adults with advanced liver fibrosis irrespective of whether or not they have diabetes.

Glucagon-like peptide-1 receptor agonists (GLP-1s) are at least as effective as pioglitazone and Vitamin E and significantly reduce steatosis, ballooning necrosis, lobular inflammation, and fibrosis according to a 2023 systematic review. Dual glucose-dependent insulinotropic polypeptide (GIP) and glucagon-like peptide-1 (GLP-1) agonists appear to be effective treatments; tirzepatide was more effective than placebo for resolution of MASH without worsening of fibrosis in patients with biopsy-confirmed MASH and stage F2 or F3 (moderate or severe) fibrosis when given once-weekly for 52 weeks, while survodutide decreased liver fat content and improved fibrosis compared to placebo (32% of people had MASH resolution or at least 1 level of improvement in their fibrosis scores), although with more frequent adverse effects of nausea, diarrhea, and vomiting

SGLT-2 inhibitors were associated with MASH resolution in 23% of people, reduced liver fat content on non-invasive testing (MRI), and a 45% reduction in fibrosis after 24 weeks of therapy. Long-term use of SGLT-2 inhibitors may also be associated with a lower risk of liver-related complications and death from liver disease as compared to GLP-1 receptor agonists.

Statin medications appear to improve liver histology and markers of liver biochemistry in people with MASLD. Since people with MASFLD are at a higher risk of cardiovascular disease, statin treatment is indicated. People with MASFLD are not at higher risk for serious liver injury from statins, according to AASLD and EASL. However, even if statins are safe to use in people with MASH cirrhosis, the AASLD suggests avoiding them in people with decompensated cirrhosis. Guidelines recommend statins to treat dyslipidemia for people with MASLD. According to NICE guidelines, statins can continue unless liver enzyme levels double within three months of starting statins. Treatment with pentoxifylline is not recommended.

Omega-3 fatty acids may reduce liver fat and improve blood lipid profile, but do not seem to improve liver histology (fibrosis, cirrhosis, cancer). The NICE does not recommend omega-3 fatty acid supplementation since randomized trials were inconclusive. Previous systematic reviews found that omega-3 fatty acid supplementation in those with MASFLD/MASH using doses of one gram daily or more (median dose four grams/day with median treatment duration six months) has been associated with improvements in liver fat. According to AASLD guidelines, "omega-3 fatty acids should not be used as a specific treatment of MASFLD or MASH, but they may be considered to treat hypertriglyceridemia for patients with MASFLD".

Resmetirom, a liver-directed thyroid hormone receptor beta-selective agonist, was conditionally approved for medical use in the United States in March 2024 for the treatment of noncirrhotic metabolic dysfunction-associated steatohepatitis and moderate-to-advanced fibrosis. Resmetirom was associated with increased rates of MASH resolution or regression of fibrosis, it also improved lipid levels.

In August 2025, the US Food and Drug Administration expanded the indication for semaglutide to include the treatment of metabolic-associated steatohepatitis in adults with moderate-to-advanced fibrosis (excessive scar tissue in the liver). Semaglutide was associated with MASH resolution in a 72-week trial compared to placebo. The percentage of people with MASH resolution was 32.7% (compared to 16% with placebo). Semaglutide may also cause regression of liver fibrosis to a less severe stage. Another trial showed that 63% of people had complete resolution of MASH, and 36.8% had at least 1 level of regression to a less severe stage of liver fibrosis. Semaglutide was also associated with a 13% weight loss in trials of MASH and improvements of some metabolic factors (such as the hemoglobin A1c (sugar levels)) which are protective in both MASLD and MASH.

=== Surgery ===
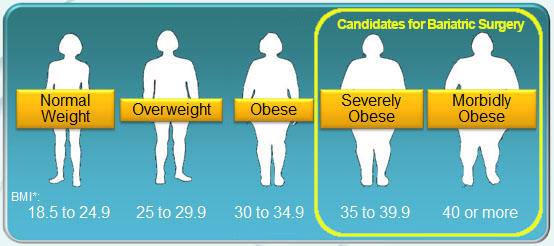
For severely obese individuals with MASLD or MASH, bariatric surgery improves or cures the liver disease if there is no cirrhosis nor liver cancer.

Bariatric surgery is an effective method for obese and diabetic individuals with MASLD to induce weight loss and reduce or resolve MASH inflammation, including fibrosis, and improve longevity. For the AASLD, bariatric surgery can be considered only for MASH on a case-by-case basis by an experienced bariatric surgery program. Indeed, some individuals might develop new or worsened features of MASLD.

About 92% of people with MASLD experienced an improvement in steatosis, and 70% a complete resolution after bariatric surgery.

A preoperative diet such as a low-calorie diet or a very-low-calorie diet is usually recommended to reduce liver volume by 16–20%. Preoperative weight loss is the only factor associated with postoperative weight loss. Preoperative weight loss can reduce operative time and hospital stay, although there is insufficient evidence whether preoperative weight loss reduces long-term morbidity or complications. Weight loss and decreases in liver size may be independent of the amount of calorie restriction.

The APWG on MASLD recommends bariatric surgery as a treatment option for those with class II obesity (BMI >32.5 kg/m^{2} for Asians, 35 kg/m^{2} for Caucasians). They consider its effects on improving liver-related complications as unproven yet, but it effectively increases longevity by improving cardiovascular factors.

Surgery carries more risks for individuals with MASH cirrhosis, with a review estimating overall morbidity to be 21%. For people with MASLD who have undifferentiated cirrhosis, the APWG recommends an investigation to determine the cause of the cirrhosis as well as the person's liver function and whether they have portal hypertension.

=== Screening ===
Cardiovascular system screening is considered mandatory by the EASL, as MASLD outcomes often result in cardiovascular complications, which can manifest as subclinical atherosclerosis, the cause of most MASLD-related deaths. People with MASLD are at high risk for cardiovascular morbidity and mortality, and "aggressive modification of cardiovascular disease risk factors is warranted in all patients" according to AASLD.

The AASLD further recommends that people with a cirrhotic MASH be systematically screened for gastric and esophageal varices and liver cancer. They do not recommend routine liver biopsies and screening for liver cancer for non-cirrhotic people with MASH, but such screening sometimes occurs on a case-by-case basis.

Also, people with MASLD may be considered for screening for hepatocellular carcinoma (liver cancer) and gastroesophageal varices. The NICE advises regular screening of people with MASLD for advanced liver fibrosis every three years for adults and every two years for children using the enhanced liver fibrosis (ELF) blood test. Follow-up is recommended for people with obesity and insulin resistance using the homeostasis model assessment of insulin resistance (HOMA-IR). People with MASH with fibrosis and hypertension merit closer monitoring, as there is a higher risk of disease progression.

=== Transplantation ===
MASLD is the second most common indication for liver transplantation in the US and Europe as of 2017.

For people with MASH and end-stage liver disease, liver failure, or liver cancer, liver transplantation is an accepted procedure according to the EASL. People with MASH cirrhosis who are being considered for a liver transplant warrant systematic evaluation for cardiovascular diseases (whether the symptoms are apparent or not).

The overall survival is comparable to transplantation following other diseases. People with MASH cirrhosis who undergo liver transplantation are more likely to die post-transplant because of cardiovascular disease or chronic kidney disease. These people with MASH are often older and are thus more prone to these complications. For these reasons and others, individuals with morbid obesity (BMI ≥ 40 kg/m^{2}) and MASH with cirrhosis may be considered unfit for liver transplantation until they follow lifestyle modifications to reduce bodyweight. Diabetic people with poor glycemic control are at similar risks, and optimal glycemic control is essential before attempting transplantation.

The Asia Pacific Working Group guidelines recommend healthcare providers discuss lifestyle modifications before and after transplantation to reduce potential risks and to assist with MASLD management after the transplant.

Simultaneous bariatric surgery and liver transplantation were performed in exceptional circumstances.

After transplantation, liver biopsy is the best method to monitor the evolution of post-transplant fibrosis, with significant fibrosis or portal hypertension one year after transplantation predicting rapid progression and graft loss and indicating the need for urgent intervention.

== Prognosis ==
The average progression rate from one stage of liver fibrosis to the next in those with MASH is estimated to be seven years. The course of progression varies with different clinical manifestations among individuals. Fibrosis in those with MASH progressed more rapidly than in those with MASLD. The risk of cirrhosis, liver cancer, liver-specific death, and overall death is higher in those with MASH as compared to MASLD. All-cause mortality in those with MASH is 25.5 deaths per 1000 person-years. Liver-specific mortality is 11.7 deaths per 1000 person-years. In one study that examined people over 15 years, 11% of those with MASH developed cirrhosis as compared to less than 1% of people with MASLD. Other estimates have shown that MASLD and MASH were found to worsen with cirrhosis in respectively 2–3% and 15–20% of the people over a 10–20 year period. Obesity predicts a worse long-term outcome than for lean individuals. In the Asia-Pacific region, about 25% of MASLD cases progress to MASH within three years, but only a low proportion (3.7%) develop advanced liver fibrosis. An international study showed that people with MASLD with advanced fibrosis had a 10-year survival rate of 81.5%.

MASLD is a risk factor for liver fibrosis, hypertension, chronic kidney disease, atrial fibrillation, myocardial infarction, ischemic stroke, and death from cardiovascular causes based on very-low to low-quality evidence from observational studies. MASLD increases the risk of diabetes by 2.2 to 3.4 times. Although MASLD can cause cirrhosis, liver failure, and liver cancer, most deaths among people with MASLD are attributable to cardiovascular disease. According to a meta-analysis of 34,000 people with MASLD over seven years, these individuals have a 65% increased risk of developing fatal or nonfatal cardiovascular events when compared to those without MASLD.

MASLD and MASH increase the risk of liver cancer. Cirrhosis and liver cancer induced by MASLD or MASH were the second cause of liver transplantation in the US in 2017, with MASLD or MASH expected to overtake alcohol related liver disease as the most common indication for a liver transplantation in the future. People with MASH cirrhosis have an increased risk of liver cancer. The rate of liver cancer associated with MASH increased fourfold between 2002 and 2012 in the US, which is more than any other cause of liver cancer. MASLD constitutes the third most common risk factor for liver cancer. Cirrhosis is found in only about 50% of people with MASLD and with liver cancer, so liver cancer may occur without cirrhosis being present. MASLD and MASH also increase the risk of non-liver cancers, especially cancers of the gastrointestinal tract such as colon cancer.

MASLD is a precursor of metabolic syndrome, although a bidirectional influence is possible. The presence and stage of fibrosis are the strongest prognostic factors for liver-related events and mortality, in particular for MASLD.

== Epidemiology ==
Non-alcoholic fatty liver disease prevalence in 2019

MASLD incidence is rapidly rising, along with obesity and diabetes, and has become the most common cause of liver disease in developed countries, for adults, teenagers, and children. The percentage of people with MASLD ranges from 9 to 36.9% in different parts of the world. Approximately 20% of the United States and 25% of the Asia-Pacific populations have non-alcoholic fatty liver. Similar prevalence can be found in Europe, although less data is available. MASLD is the most common in the Middle East (32%) and South America (30%), while Africa has the lowest rates (13%). Compared to the 2000s, NAFL and MASH respectively increased 2-fold and 2.5-fold in the 2010s in the USA.

MASLD and MASH are more prevalent in Hispanics - which can be attributed to high rates of obesity and type 2 diabetes in Hispanic populations, intermediate in Whites, and lowest in Blacks. MASFLD was observed to be twice as prevalent in men as women. For severely obese individuals, the prevalence of MASLD rises over 90%, and for those with diabetes, over 60%, and up to 20% for normal-weight people. MASLD is present in 65% to 90% of people who have had bariatric surgery, and up to 75% of them have MASH. Ultrasonography and proton NMR spectroscopy studies suggest that about 25% of the population seems to be affected by MASLD or MASH.

Although the disease is commonly associated with obesity, a significant proportion of those affected are of normal weight or lean. Lean MASLD affects between 10 and 20% of Americans and Europeans, and approximately 25% of Asians, although some countries have a higher incidence (e.g., India has a very high proportion of lean MASLD and almost no obese MASLD). PNPLA3 may be relevant for the progression of MASLD in lean people. Thus, people with MASLD deserve consideration for treatment regardless of the presence or absence of obesity.

In children ages 1 to 19, the prevalence was found to be approximately 8% in the general population, up to 34% in studies with data from child obesity clinics.

The majority of cryptogenic cirrhosis is believed to be due to MASH. MASFLD prevalence is expected to increase steadily, from 25% in 2018 to a projected 33.5% of people with MASLD globally in 2030, and from 20% to a projected 27% of those with MASLD will progress to MASH.

== History ==
The first acknowledged case of obesity-related non-alcoholic fatty liver was observed in 1952 by Samuel Zelman. Zelman started investigating after observing a fatty liver in a hospital employee who drank more than twenty bottles of Coca-Cola a day. He then went on to design a trial for a year and a half on 20 people with obesity who did not have alcohol use disorder, finding that about half of them had substantially fatty livers. Fatty liver was, however, linked to diabetes since at least 1784 — an observation picked up again in the 1930s. Studies in experimental animals implicated choline inadequacy in the 1920s and excess sugar consumption in 1949.

The name "non-alcoholic steatohepatitis" (NASH) was later defined in 1980 by Jurgen Ludwig and his colleagues from the Mayo Clinic to raise awareness of the existence of this pathology, as similar reports previously were dismissed as "patients' lies". This paper was mostly ignored at the time but eventually came to be seen as a landmark paper, and starting in the mid-1990s, the condition began to be intensively studied, with a series of international meetings being held on the topic since 1998. The broader NAFLD term started to be used around 2002. Diagnostic criteria began to be worked out, and in 2005 the Pathology Committee of the NIH NASH Clinical Research Network proposed the NAS scoring system.

In 2023, a global consensus panel composed mostly of hepatology researchers and clinicians recommended a change of name to metabolic dysfunction–associated steatotic liver disease (MASLD). The new name was proposed after 70% of a panel of experts expressed support for this name. This new name was adopted in 2023. Formerly, abnormal accumulation of fat in the liver in the absence of secondary causes of fatty liver, such as significant alcohol use, viral hepatitis, or medications that can induce fatty liver, was the definition of NAFLD. However, the term MASLD accepts that there may be other conditions present, but focuses on the metabolic abnormalities contributing to the disorder.

== Society and culture ==
=== Policy recommendations ===
The European Association for the Study of the Liver (EASL) recommends that Europe's public health authorities "restrict advertising and marketing of sugar-sweetened beverages and industrially processed foods high in saturated fat, sugar, and salt", as well as "fiscal measures to discourage the consumption of sugar-sweetened beverages and legislation to ensure that the food industry improves labeling and the composition of processed foods", as well as "public awareness campaigns on liver disease, highlighting that it is not only linked to excessive consumption of alcohol".

=== Media ===
In France, the French syndicate of non-alcoholic beverages "Boissons Rafraîchissantes de France" (that included soft drink producers such as Coca-Cola France, Orangina, PepsiCo France) was denounced by the French journal fr:Canard Enchainé for misleading consumers using a communication on their website titled "Better understanding the NASH pathology", explaining that "NASH pathology is sometimes called the soda illness by language abuse or an unfortunate semantic shortcut, as it is not directly linked to the consumption of non-alcoholic beverages". This page and others on the same website, such as one titled "Say no to disinformation," were removed since then.

== Children ==
Pediatric MASLD was first reported in 1983. It is the most common chronic liver disease among children and adolescents since at least 2007, affecting 10 to 20% of them in the US in 2016. MASLD is associated with metabolic syndrome, which is a cluster of risk factors that contribute to the development of cardiovascular disease and type 2 diabetes mellitus. Studies have demonstrated that abdominal obesity and insulin resistance, in particular, are significant contributors to the development of MASFLD. Coexisting liver diseases, such as hepatitis C and cardiovascular diseases such as atherosclerosis, are also associated with an increased risk of MASFLD. Some children were diagnosed as early as two years old, with a mean age of diagnosis between 11 and 13 years old. The mean age is usually above 10 years, as children can also report non-specific symptoms and are thus difficult to diagnose for MASLD.

Boys are more likely to be diagnosed with MASLD than girls. Overweight, or even weight gain, in childhood and adolescence, is associated with an increased risk of MASLD later in life, with adult MASLD predicted in a 31-year follow-up study by risk factors during childhood including BMI, plasma insulin levels, male sex, genetic background (PNPLA3 and TM6SF2 variants) and low birth weight, an emerging risk factor for adulthood MASLD. In a study, simple steatosis was present in up to 45% in children with a clinical suspicion of MASLD. Children with simple steatosis have a worse prognosis than adults, with significantly more of them progressing from MASFLD to MASH compared to adults. Indeed, 17-25% of children with MASLD develop MASH in general, and up to 83% for children with severe obesity (versus 29% for adults), further suggesting that hepatic fibrosis seems to follow a more aggressive clinical course in children compared to adults.

Early diagnosis of MASLD in children may help prevent the development of liver disease during adulthood. This is challenging as most children with MASLD are asymptomatic, with only 42-59% showing abdominal pain. Other symptoms might be present, such as right upper quadrant pain or acanthosis nigricans, the latter of which is often present in children with MASH. An enlarged liver occurs in 30–40% of children with MASFLD.

The AASLD recommends a diagnostic liver biopsy in children when the diagnosis is unclear or before starting a potentially hepatotoxic medical therapy. The EASL suggests using fibrosis tests such as elastography, acoustic radiation force impulse imaging, and serum biomarkers to reduce the number of biopsies. In follow-up, NICE guidelines recommend that healthcare providers offer children regular MASLD screening for advanced liver fibrosis every two years using the enhanced liver fibrosis (ELF) blood test. Several studies also suggest magnetic resonance elastography as an alternative to the less reliable ultrasonography.

Intensive lifestyle modifications, including physical activity and dietary changes, are the first-line treatment according to AASLD and EASL, as they improve liver histology and aminotransferase levels. In terms of pharmacological treatment, the AASLD and EASL do not recommend metformin, but vitamin E may improve liver health in some children. The NICE advises the use of vitamin E for children with advanced liver fibrosis, whether they have diabetes or not. The only treatment shown to be effective in childhood MASLD is weight loss.

Some evidence indicates that maternal undernutrition or overnutrition increases a child's susceptibility to MASH and hastens its progression.

== Research ==
=== Diagnosis and biomarkers ===
Since a MASLD diagnosis based on a liver biopsy is invasive and makes it difficult to estimate epidemiology, it is a high research priority to find accurate, inexpensive, and noninvasive methods of diagnosing and monitoring MASLD disease and its progression. The search for these biomarkers of MASLD, NAFL, and MASH involves lipidomics, medical imaging, proteomics, blood tests, and scoring systems.

According to a review, proton density fat fraction estimation by magnetic resonance imaging (MRI-PDFF) may be considered the most accurate and even gold standard test to quantify hepatic steatosis. They recommend ultrasound-based transient elastography to accurately diagnose both fibrosis and cirrhosis in a routine clinical setting, with more objectivity than ultrasonography but with lower accuracy than magnetic resonance elastography; and plasma cytokeratin 18 (CK18) fragment levels to be a moderately accurate biomarker of steatohepatitis. However, transient elastography can fail for people with pre-hepatic portal hypertension.

=== Medication development ===
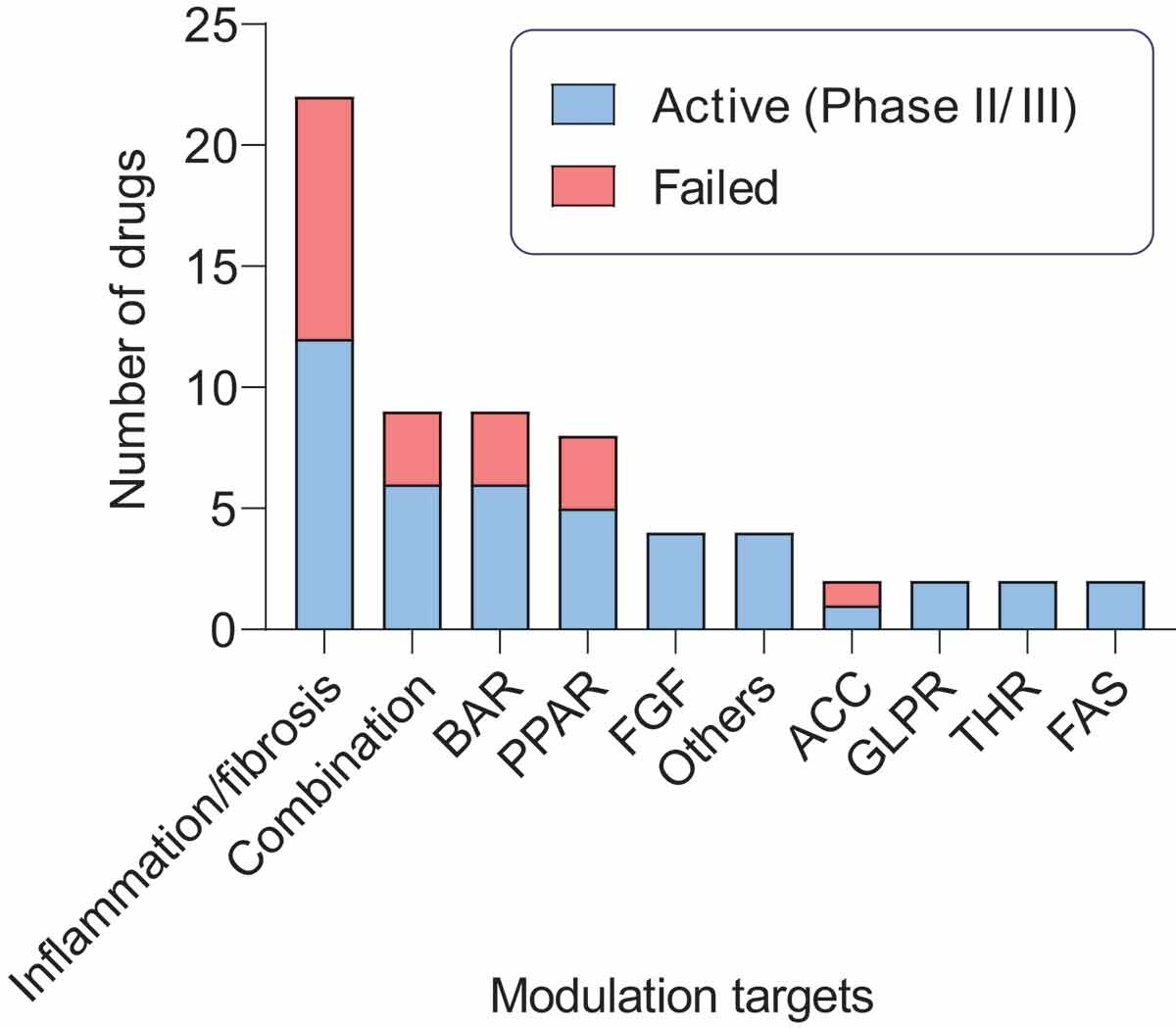
Drug candidates for MASFLD and MASH by mechanism of action as of 2021

A variety of medications with different mechanisms of action have been tested in clinical trials. Clinical trials can be separated into four main targets believed to reduce the progression of the disease or reverse it:

1. Improving metabolism (improving insulin sensitivity, inhibiting de novo lipogenesis, or increasing fatty acid oxidation). Metabolic modulators tested in MASH include glucagon-like peptide-1 receptor agonists (GLP-1 agonists), GLP-1 and glucose-dependent insulinotropic polypeptide (GIP) or glucagon co-agonists and thyromimetics. Some of these drugs may treat MASFLD by significantly reducing body weight.
2. Reducing inflammation, for example reducing oxidative stress and hepatocyte death. These drugs, such as chemokine antagonists, anti-apoptotics, vascular adhesion protein-1 inhibitors, and c-Jun N-terminal kinase inhibitors, have not shown benefit.
3. "Gut-liver axis targets" that either change a person's microbiome, or act on bile acids
4. Anti-fibrotic drugs, such as fibroblast growth factor analogues, which have largely not met their endpoints

Other treatments such as farnesoid X receptor (FXR) agonists, peroxisome proliferator-activated receptor (PPAR) agonists, and ASK1 (apoptosis signal-regulating kinase 1) inhibitors may improve MASFLD by multiple mechanisms simultaneously.
