= Omzotirome =

Chemical compound

Identifiers
- IUPAC name: 3-(4-((7-Hydroxy-6-methyl-2,3-dihydro-1H-inden-4-YL)methyl)-3,5-dimethyl-1H-pyrazol-1-yl)propanoic acid
- CAS Number: 1092551-88-6
- PubChem CID: 25125529
- DrugBank: DB16046
- ChemSpider: 28534873
- UNII: B93608MTGW
- ChEMBL: ChEMBL4297445
- CompTox Dashboard (EPA): DTXSID70148862

Chemical and physical data
- Formula: C_{19}H_{24}N_{2}O_{3}
- Molar mass: 328.412 g·mol^{−1}
- 3D model (JSmol): Interactive image
- SMILES: CC1=CC(=C2CCCC2=C1O)CC3=C(N(N=C3C)CCC(=O)O)C
- InChI: InChI=1S/C19H24N2O3/c1-11-9-14(15-5-4-6-16(15)19(11)24)10-17-12(2)20-21(13(17)3)8-7-18(22)23/h9,24H,4-8,10H2,1-3H3,(H,22,23); Key:OFUOCIUIWKDKPA-UHFFFAOYSA-N

Omzotirome (INN), formerly codenamed TRC-150094, is a thyromimetic drug which acts as a metabolic modulator which restores metabolic flexibility. It has been shown to improve insulin resistance and hyperglycemia, and is in Phase III human clinical trials for the treatment of Cardiometabolic-Based Chronic Disease (CMBCD) by improving dysglycemia, dyslipidemia and hypertension.
