= Sheila Bird =

British statistician

Dame Sheila Bird DBE FRSE FMedSci
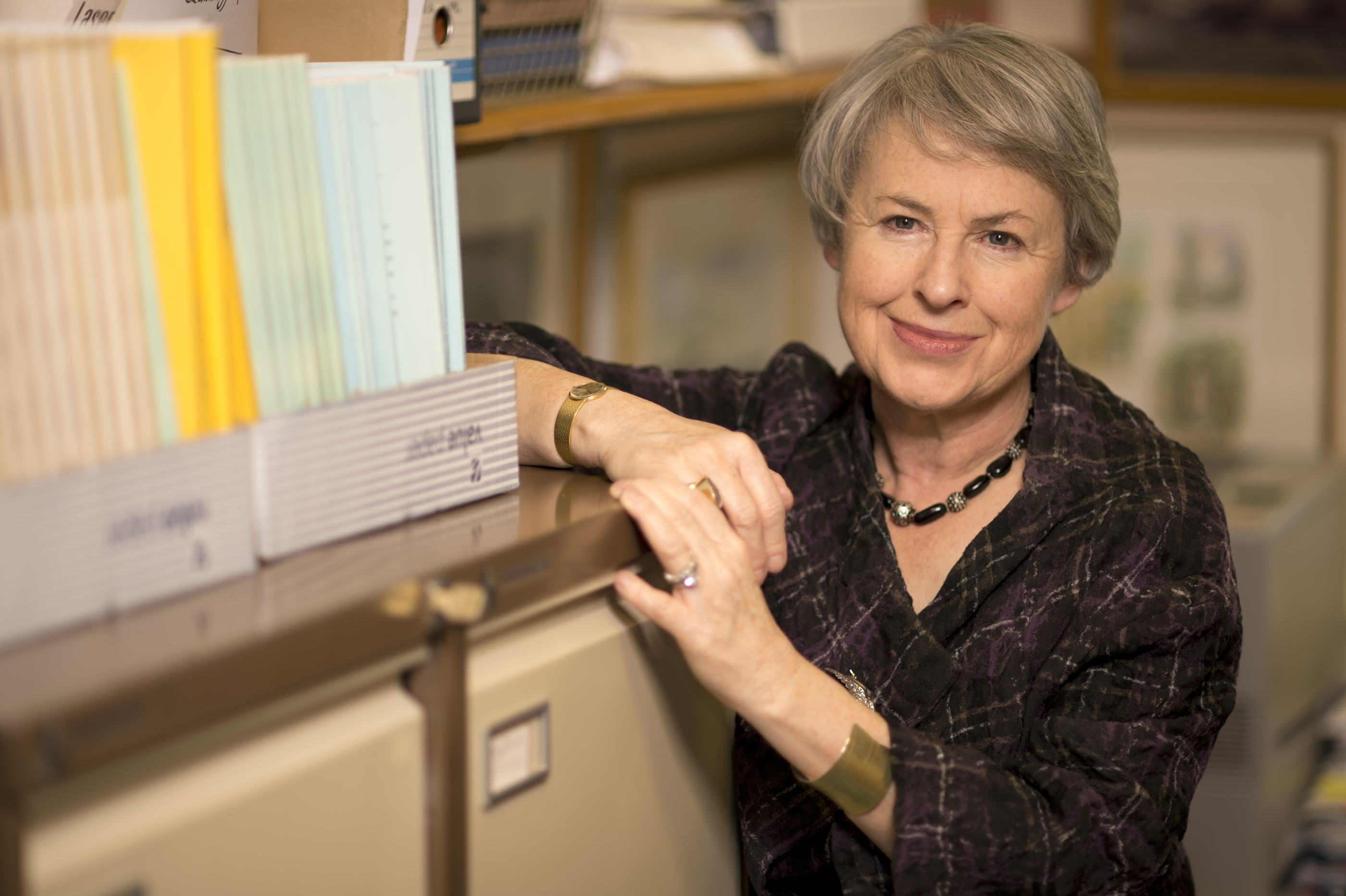
- Born: Sheila Macdonald Gore; 18 May 1952 (age 74); Inverness, Scotland
- Education: University of Aberdeen
- Known for: Statistical thinking at the interface of public health and other jurisdictions.
- Spouse: Dr A Graham Bird (deceased)
- Awards: DBE FRSE [[Fellow of the Academy of Medical Sciences|FMedSci; DSc (Hon. Edin.) Royal Statistical Society medals (Guy bronze, 1989;Bradford Hill, 2000; Chambers, 2010; Howard, 2015).
- Scientific career
- Fields: Biostatistics
- Workplaces: Medical Research Council; University of Strathclyde; University of Edinburgh

Dame Sheila Macdonald Bird DBE FRSE FMedSci (née Gore; born 18 May 1952) is a Scottish biostatistician whose assessment of misuse of statistics in the British Medical Journal (BMJ) and BMJ series ‘Statistics in Question’ led to statistical guidelines for contributors to medical journals. Bird's doctoral work on non-proportional hazards in breast cancer found application in organ transplantation where beneficial matching was the basis for UK's allocation of cadaveric kidneys for a decade. Bird led the Medical Research Council (MRC) Biostatistical Initiative in support of AIDS/HIV studies in Scotland, as part of which Dr A. Graham Bird and she pioneered Willing Anonymous Salivary HIV (WASH) surveillance studies in prisons.

Her work with Cooper on UK dietary bovine spongiform encephalopathy (BSE) exposure revealed that the 1940–69 birth cohort was the most exposed and implied age-dependency in susceptibility to clinical vCJD progression from dietary BSE exposure since most vCJD cases were younger, born in 1970–89. Bird also designed the European Union's robust surveillance for transmissible spongiform encephalopathies in sheep which revolutionised the understanding of scrapie.

Record linkage studies in Scotland were central to Bird's work (with others) on the late sequelae of Hepatitis C virus infection and on the morbidity and mortality of opioid addiction. Her team first quantified the very high risk of drugs-related death in the fortnight after prison-release, in response to which Bird and Hutchinson proposed a prison-based randomized controlled trial of naloxone, the opioid antagonist, for prisoners-on-release who had a history of heroin injection. Bird introduced the Royal Statistical Society’s statistical seminars for journalists and awards for statistical excellence in journalism. She is the first statistician to have been awarded four medals by the Royal Statistical Society (Guy bronze, 1989; Austin Bradford Hill, 2000; Chambers, 2010, Howard, 2015).

== Early life and education ==
Sheila Macdonald Gore was born in Inverness, Scotland on 18 May 1952 to Isabella Agnes Gordon (née Macdonald) and Herbert Gore. She was educated at Elgin Academy in Scotland, where the mathematics master, Lewis Grant, introduced her to statistics. She graduated with a joint-honours in mathematics and statistics from the University of Aberdeen. From 1974-1976 she was a research assistant in medical statistics at the University of Edinburgh where she, Jones and Rytter quantified the misuse of statistics in the BMJ. In his editorial, Stephen Lock "took on the chin" their 1977 paper and championed statistical guidelines for contributors to medical journals. Doctoral work followed, begun at the University of Edinburgh and supervised by Stuart Pocock, on the analysis of survival in breast cancer which Bird undertook part-time during a lectureship in statistics at the University of Aberdeen (1976–80) before joining the Medical Research Council's Biostatistics Unit in Cambridge in 1980.

== Career ==
Bird worked for the Medical Research Council (MRC), as Programme Leader at their Biostatistics Unit in Cambridge.

Publication of Bird's 23 articles on ‘Statistics in Question’ in the BMJ led to her running World Health Organization (WHO) workshops on research methods in diarrhoeal diseases for Third World paediatricians, through which she and Dilip Mahalanabis designed and piloted a clinical record-form which was subsequently adopted for all WHO-funded randomised controlled trials (RCTs) of oral rehydration solutions (ORS). The common record facilitated a subsequent exploratory analysis of individual patient data by Bird and Fontaine. This suggested benefit from lower osmolarity solutions, which was then formally tested in a series of RCTs with global change to low osmolarity ORS adopted in 2001.

Back in Cambridge, Bird worked with paediatrician Dr Colin Morley on the British Randomised Evaluation of ALEC Therapy (BREATHE), the first RCT to demonstrate a one-third reduced mortality in very premature babies by administration at birth of artificial surfactant. ALEC (artificial lung expanding compound) was named for Alec Bangham FRS, who developed it. Non-Cambridge neonatologists’ prior belief was elicited by ‘trial roulette’ and had centred on a one quarter-reduction, the effect-size that BREATHE was powered to detect.

Work on transplantation statistics in the 1980s with Gilks and Bradley led to beneficial matching being adopted as the basis of UK's exchange of cadaveric donor kidneys. To estimate the potential for cadaveric solid organ donation from brainstem-dead donors, Bird designed UK's first confidential audit of all deaths in intensive care units which revealed that relatives’ refusal –rate (then 30%, since risen to 40%), not doctors’ failure to ask, was the fundamental problem.

Bird led the MRC Biostatistical Initiative in support of AIDS/HIV studies in Scotland (MRC-BIAS, 1990–1996), which included projection of Scotland's cases of severe immunodeficiency (so-called CD200 cases) and HIV epidemiological studies in prisons, both with co-investigator, clinical immunologist Dr A. Graham Bird.

Bird's work at the interface of public health and other jurisdictions continued. A series of record-linkage studies in Scotland on the late sequelae of Hepatitis C virus infection (with Hutchinson and Goldberg) and on the high risk of drugs-related death soon after prison-release (or after hospital-discharge for drug-treatment clients) followed. With Cooper, she estimated UK's dietary exposure to BSE by birth-cohort and they deduced lower susceptibility to vCJD-progression from dietary BSE exposure at older ages. Bird also designed the European Union's robust surveillance at (with genotyping) abattoirs for late-stage transmissible spongiform encephalopathies in sheep.

Bird served on five working parties of the Royal Statistical Society (RSS): Counting with Confidence, Statistics and Statisticians in Drug Regulation, Performance Monitoring in the Public Services (as chair) and Statistical Issues in First-in-Man Studies. As RSS's vice-president for external affairs (2005–09), Bird introduced statistical seminars for journalists and the RSS's awards for statistical excellence in journalism; and supported Straight Statistics by contributing over 100 articles, many on H1N1 pandemic influenza, others based on her 20-weekly reporting with Colonel Clive Fairweather on military fatality-rates in Iraq and Afghanistan by nationality and cause. Bird led the RSS's campaign for legislation to end the late registration of inquest deaths in England, Wales and Northern Ireland.

With Parmar and Strang, Bird designed the MRC-funded pilot Naloxone Investigation (N-ALIVE) of naloxone-on-release for prisoners in England with a history of heroin injection, which was then the largest randomized controlled trial in prisons in Europe. She also designed the powerful before/after evaluation of Scotland’s National Naloxone Policy which demonstrated effectiveness within 3 years.

Bird demitted office from MRC Biostatistics Unit on St Andrews Day (30 November) 2015. Her record-linkage work continued on the mortality of Scotland’s methadone client cohort with particular focus on those whose daily dose of prescribed methadone was in the top quintile (90+ mg/ml). She served on the Royal Statistical Society’s COVID-19 Taskforce and contributed posts for press and public understanding about the pandemic to the Science Media Centre.

From 2019-2024, Bird was a member of the Statistics Expert Group to the Infected Blood Inquiry and continued contributing to their record-linkage work during the pandemic. With Spiegelhalter, she co-directed, and was cross-examined on, the work underlying the final Report in 2022 from the Statistics Expert Group, which entailed extensive statistical analysis and modelling.

== Honours and awards ==
As Sheila M. Gore, she won the Guy Medal in Bronze in 1989. Bird was appointed OBE in 2011 for services to social statistics. She was made a Fellow of the Royal Society of Edinburgh in 2012 and of the Academy of Medical Sciences in 2017. In 2018, she received an honorary doctorate from the University of Edinburgh. Bird was appointed Dame Commander of the Order of the British Empire (DBE) for services to statistics in the King’s Birthday Honours list, June 2026.

== Personal life ==
In September 1999 she and Dr A. Graham Bird married. Six weeks after their marriage he was diagnosed with glioblastoma multiforme and died in January 2000. Up until his death she published under her maiden name, Gore, however since she has published under her married name of Bird, in her husband's honour.
