= Sobetirome =

Chemical compound

Clinical data
- Other names: GC-1
- Routes of administration: Oral

Legal status
- Legal status: Investigational

Identifiers
- IUPAC name: 2-[4-[(4-Hydroxy-3-propan-2-ylphenyl)methyl]-3,5-dimethylphenoxy]acetic acid
- CAS Number: 211110-63-3
- PubChem CID: 9862248
- IUPHAR/BPS: 2639
- DrugBank: DB07425
- ChemSpider: 8037944
- UNII: XQ31741E9Q
- KEGG: D09381
- ChEBI: CHEBI:79988
- ChEMBL: ChEMBL107400
- CompTox Dashboard (EPA): DTXSID60891557

Chemical and physical data
- Formula: C_{20}H_{24}O_{4}
- Molar mass: 328.408 g·mol^{−1}
- 3D model (JSmol): Interactive image
- SMILES: CC1=CC(=CC(=C1CC2=CC(=C(C=C2)O)C(C)C)C)OCC(=O)O
- InChI: InChI=1S/C20H24O4/c1-12(2)17-9-15(5-6-19(17)21)10-18-13(3)7-16(8-14(18)4)24-11-20(22)23/h5-9,12,21H,10-11H2,1-4H3,(H,22,23); Key:QNAZTOHXCZPOSA-UHFFFAOYSA-N

Sobetirome (GC-1) is a thyromimetic drug that binds to the thyroid hormone receptor TRβ1 preferentially compared to TRα1. It has been investigated for the treatment of dyslipidemia, obesity, Pitt–Hopkins syndrome, cholestatic liver disease, multiple sclerosis, bleomycin-induced lung fibrosis, and COVID-19 caused ARDS. It was designated as an orphan drug by the FDA for the treatment of X-linked adrenoleukodystrophy.
