= Thyromimetic =

Triiodothyronine, a native thyroid hormone

Sobetirome

Omzotirome

Eprotirome

VK2809

Resmetirom

Thyromimetic drugs are synthetic agonists of the thyroid hormone receptor's isoforms TR α1, TRα2, TRβ1, or TRβ2, mimicking some or all of the effects of endogenously produced thyroid hormones that regulate metabolism. Some thyromimetic drugs are selective for various of these receptors over others, enabling more targeted effects and reducing toxicity. Thyromimetics selective for TRβ—including eprotirome, sobetirome, resmetirom, and the prodrug VK2809—have been investigated for the treatment of metabolic dysfunction–associated steatotic liver disease, dyslipidemia, and other metabolic and neurodegenerative diseases.
