= Hepatology (journal) =

- Discipline: Hepatology
- Language: English
- Edited by: Gregory J. Gores

Publication details
- History: 1981–present
- Publisher: Lippincott Williams & Wilkins on behalf of the American Association for the Study of Liver Diseases
- Frequency: Monthly
- Impact factor: 17.425 (2020)

Standard abbreviations
- ISO 4: Hepatology

Indexing
- CODEN: HPTLD9
- ISSN: 0270-9139 (print); 1527-3350 (web)
- LCCN: 81641046
- OCLC no.: 42755926

Links
- Journal homepage; Current issue; Online archive

Hepatology is a peer-reviewed medical journal of hepatology. It is published monthly by Lippincott Williams & Wilkins on behalf of the American Association for the Study of Liver Diseases. The journal was established in 1981 and the editor-in-chief is Gregory J. Gores (Mayo Clinic).

== Indexing and abstracting ==
The journal is abstracted and indexed in the following databases:

- Abstracts in Anthropology
- Abstracts on Hygiene & Communicable Diseases
- Animal Breeding Abstracts
- Biological Abstracts
- BIOSIS Previews
- CAB Abstracts
- CABDirect
- Chemical Abstracts Service
- Current Contents/Clinical Medicine
- Current Contents/Life Sciences
- Dairy Science Abstracts
- Embase
- Global Health
- Index Medicus/MEDLINE/PubMed
- PubMed Dietary Supplement Subset
- Science Citation Index
- Scopus
- Tropical Diseases Bulletin

According to Journal Citation Reports, the journal's 2020 impact factor is 17.425, ranking it 6th out of 92 journals in the category "Gastroenterology & Hepatology".
