= Journal of Hepatology =

- Discipline: Hepatology
- Language: English
- Edited by: Paolo Angeli

Publication details
- History: 1985–present
- Publisher: Elsevier
- Frequency: Monthly
- Impact factor: 33.0 (2024)

Standard abbreviations
- ISO 4: J. Hepatol.

Indexing
- J. Hepatol.
- CODEN: JOHEEC
- ISSN: 0168-8278 (print); 1600-0641 (web)
- OCLC no.: 11460329
- J. Hepatol. Suppl.
- CODEN: JHSUFX
- ISSN: 0169-5185
- OCLC no.: 12243608

Links
- Journal homepage

Journal of Hepatology is a peer-reviewed scientific journal that was established in 1985 by Munksgaard International Publishers. A supplement, Journal of Hepatology Supplement was also published in 1985, but ceased in the same year.

Elsevier took over publication in 2001. The journal is currently edited by Paolo Angeli and is published on a monthly basis. It is associated with the European Association for the Study of the Liver.

== Abstracting and indexing ==
Journal of Hepatology is abstracted and indexed the following bibliographic databases:

- Academic Search Premier
- BIOSIS
- CAB Abstracts
- EMBASE
- MEDLINE
- Science Citation Index Expanded
- Scopus
- Veterinary Science Database

According to the Journal Citation Reports, the journal has a 2021 impact factor of 30.083.
