= American Association for the Study of Liver Diseases =

The American Association for the Study of Liver Diseases (AASLD) is a leading organization of scientists and health care professionals committed to preventing and curing liver disease. AASLD was founded in 1950 by a group of leading liver specialists (including Hans Popper, Leon Schiff, Fred Hoffbauer, Cecil Watson, Jesse Bollman, and Sheila Sherlock) to bring together those who had contributed to the field of hepatology.

== Mission ==
AASLD's mission: To advance and disseminate the science and practice of hepatology, and to promote liver health and quality patient care.

Hepatology has been recognized as a discipline only in the last few decades, and AASLD played a seminal and unifying role in focusing interest on hepatological problems, as well as the founding of other hepatological societies.

== Conferences ==
AASLD annually hosts The Liver Meeting, which is the largest worldwide scientific conference on liver diseases. It also conducts several regional liver disease meetings that vary in topic and emphasis.

== Journals ==
AASLD publishes three major scientific journals on liver disease: Hepatology, Liver Transplantation and Clinical Liver Disease.

- Clinical Liver Disease is a multimedia review journal. It is clinical in focus and blends text, audio, video, webinars and other multimedia into an interactive resource for all physicians and healthcare providers with liver disease patients.

== Membership ==
The organization has more than 5,000 members, including physicians, scientists, medical students, residents, and other health care professionals (nurses, nurse practitioners, physician assistants and others) who work in hepatology and related areas.

== See also ==
- European Association for the Study of the Liver
