= Liver disease =

- Other names: Hepatic disease
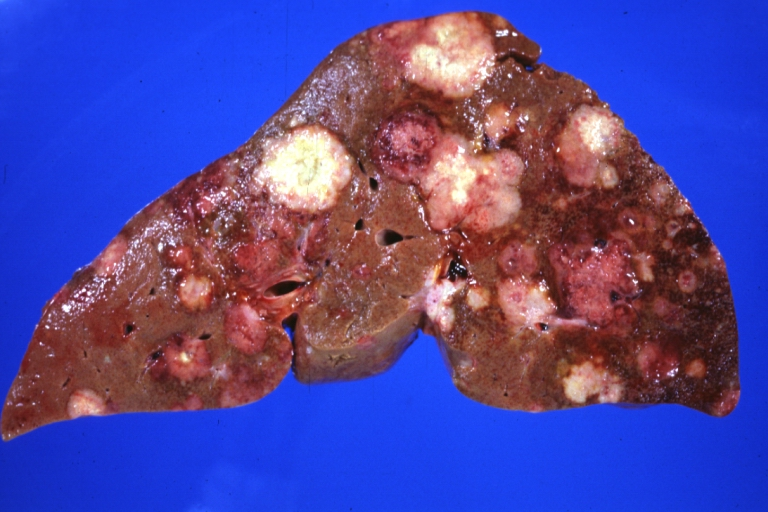
- A gross pathology specimen of liver metastases caused by pancreatic cancer
- Specialty: Hepatology, gastroenterology
- Types: Fatty liver disease, Hepatitis (and several more)
- Diagnostic method: Liver function tests
- Treatment: Depends on type (See types)

Liver disease, or hepatic disease, is any of many diseases of the liver. If long-lasting it is termed chronic liver disease. Although the diseases differ in detail, liver diseases often have features in common.

== Types ==
There are more than a hundred different liver diseases. Some of the most common are:

- Fascioliasis, a parasitic infection of liver caused by a liver fluke of the genus FascioIa, mostly FascioIa hepatica.
- Hepatitis, inflammation of the liver, is caused by various viruses (viral hepatitis) also by some liver toxins (e.g. alcoholic hepatitis), autoimmunity (autoimmune hepatitis) or hereditary conditions.
- Alcoholic liver disease is a hepatic manifestation of alcohol overconsumption, including fatty liver disease, alcoholic hepatitis, and cirrhosis. Analogous terms such as "drug-induced" or "toxic" liver disease are also used to refer to disorders caused by various drugs.
- Fatty liver disease (hepatic steatosis) is a reversible condition where large vacuoles of triglyceride fat accumulate in liver cells. Metabolic dysfunction–associated steatotic liver disease is a spectrum of disease associated with obesity and metabolic syndrome.
- Hereditary diseases that cause damage to the liver include hemochromatosis, involving accumulation of iron in the body, and Wilson's disease. Liver damage is also a clinical feature of alpha 1-antitrypsin deficiency and glycogen storage disease type II.
- In transthyretin-related hereditary amyloidosis, the liver produces a mutated transthyretin protein, which has severe neurodegenerative or cardiopathic effects. Liver transplantation can be curative.
- Gilbert's syndrome, a genetic disorder of bilirubin metabolism found in a small percent of the population, can cause mild jaundice.
- Cirrhosis is the formation of fibrous tissue (fibrosis) in the place of liver cells that have died due to a variety of causes, including viral hepatitis, alcohol overconsumption, and other forms of liver toxicity. Cirrhosis causes chronic liver failure.
- Primary liver cancer most commonly manifests as hepatocellular carcinoma or cholangiocarcinoma; rarer forms include angiosarcoma and hemangiosarcoma of the liver. (Many liver malignancies are secondary lesions that have metastasized from primary cancers in the gastrointestinal tract and other organs, such as the kidneys and lungs.)
- Primary biliary cirrhosis is a serious autoimmune disease of the bile capillaries.
- Primary sclerosing cholangitis is a serious chronic inflammatory disease of the bile duct, which is believed to be autoimmune in origin.
- Budd–Chiari syndrome is the clinical picture caused by occlusion of the hepatic vein.
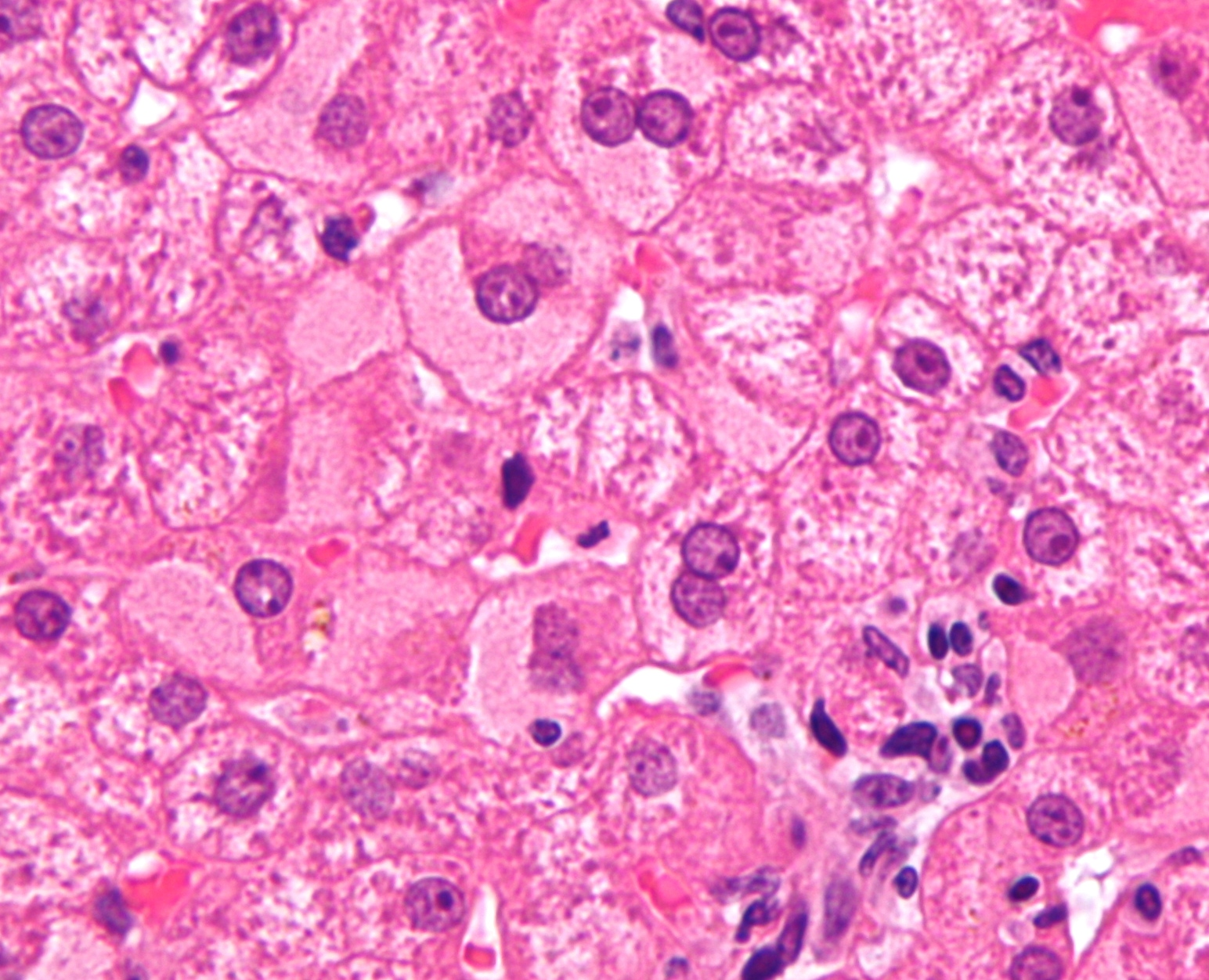
Ground glass hepatocytes

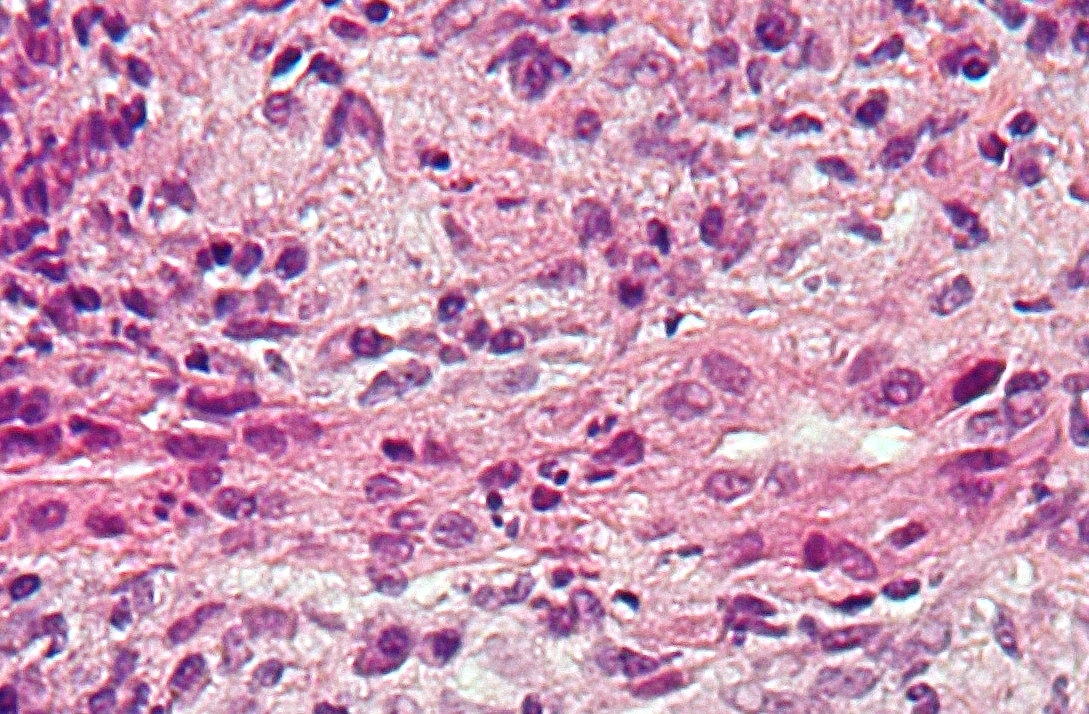
Primary biliary cirrhosis

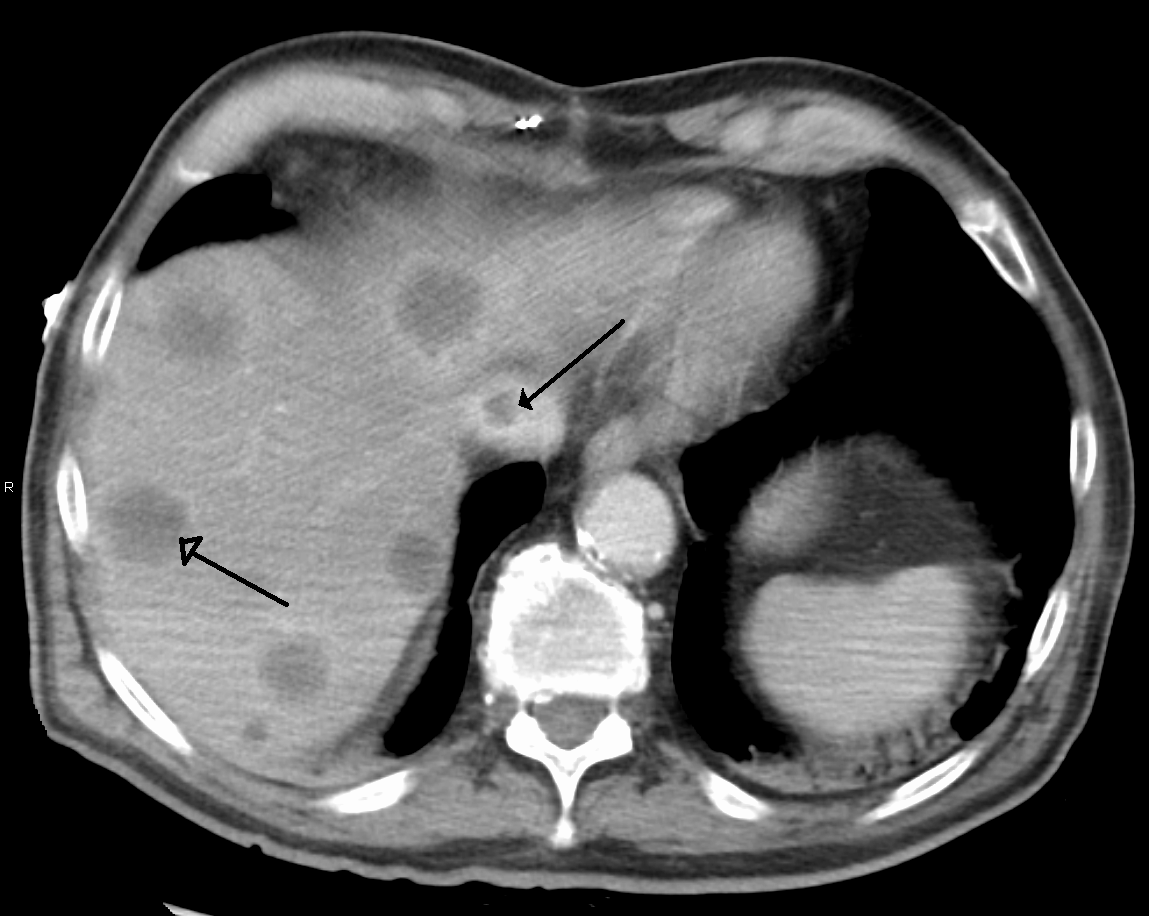
Budd–Chiari syndrome

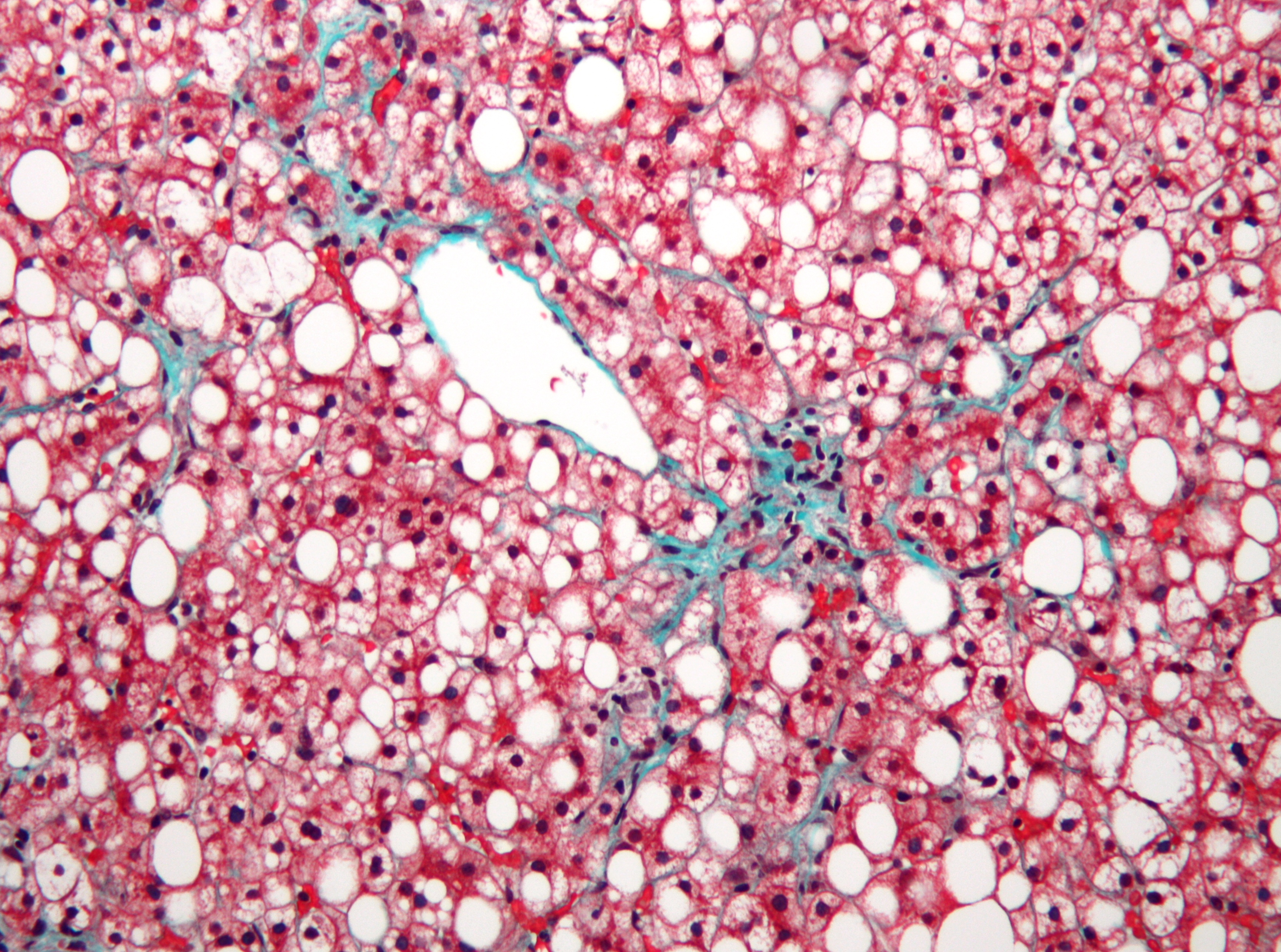
Micrograph of metabolic dysfunction–associated steatotic liver disease (MASLD)

== Signs and symptoms ==
Some of the signs and symptoms of liver disease are the following:

- Jaundice
- Confusion and altered consciousness caused by hepatic encephalopathy.
- Thrombocytopenia and coagulopathy.
- Risk of bleeding symptoms, particularly taking place in the gastrointestinal tract

== Mechanisms ==
Liver diseases can develop through several mechanisms:

=== DNA damage ===
One general mechanism, increased DNA damage, is shared by some of the major liver diseases, including infection by hepatitis B virus or hepatitis C virus, heavy alcohol consumption, and obesity.

Viral infection by the hepatitis B virus, or hepatitis C virus, causes an increase in reactive oxygen species. The increase in intracellular reactive oxygen species is about 10,000-fold with chronic hepatitis B virus infection and 100,000-fold following hepatitis C virus infection. This increase in reactive oxygen species causes inflammation and more than 20 types of DNA damage. Oxidative DNA damage is mutagenic and also causes epigenetic alterations at the sites of DNA repair. Epigenetic alterations and mutations affect the cellular machinery that may cause the cell to replicate at a higher rate or result in the cell avoiding apoptosis, and thus contribute to liver disease. By the time accumulating epigenetic and mutational changes eventually cause hepatocellular carcinoma, epigenetic alterations appear to have an even larger role in carcinogenesis than mutations. Only one gene, TP53, is mutated in more than 20% of liver cancers, while 41 genes each have hypermethylated promoters (repressing gene expression) in more than 20% of liver cancers.

Alcohol consumption in excess causes a build-up of acetaldehyde. Acetaldehyde and free radicals generated by metabolizing alcohol induce DNA damage and oxidative stress. In addition, activation of neutrophils in alcoholic liver disease contributes to the pathogenesis of hepatocellular damage by releasing reactive oxygen species (which can damage DNA). The level of oxidative stress and acetaldehyde-induced DNA adducts due to alcohol consumption does not appear sufficient to cause increased mutagenesis. However, as reviewed by Nishida et al., alcohol exposure, causing oxidative DNA damage (which is repairable), can result in epigenetic alterations at the sites of DNA repair. Alcohol-induced epigenetic alterations of gene expression appear to lead to liver injury and ultimately carcinoma.

Obesity is associated with a higher risk of primary liver cancer. As shown with mice, obese mice are prone to liver cancer, likely due to two factors. Obese mice have increased pro-inflammatory cytokines. Obese mice also have higher levels of deoxycholic acid, a product of bile acid alteration by certain gut microbes, and these microbes are increased with obesity. The excess deoxycholic acid causes DNA damage and inflammation in the liver, which, in turn, can lead to liver cancer.

=== Other relevant aspects ===
Viral infections cause some forms of liver disease. Viral hepatitides such as Hepatitis B virus and Hepatitis C virus can be vertically transmitted during birth via contact with infected blood. According to a 2012 NICE publication, "about 85% of hepatitis B infections in newborns become chronic". In occult cases, Hepatitis B virus is present by hepatitis B virus DNA, but testing for HBsAg is negative. High consumption of alcohol can lead to several forms of liver disease including alcoholic hepatitis, alcoholic liver disease, cirrhosis, and liver cancer. In the earlier stages of alcoholic liver disease, fat builds up in the liver's cells due to increased creation of triglycerides and fatty acids and a decreased ability to break down fatty acids. Progression of the disease can lead to liver inflammation from the excess fat in the liver. Scarring in the liver often occurs as the body attempts to heal, and extensive scarring can lead to the development of cirrhosis in more advanced stages of the disease. Approximately 3–10% of individuals with cirrhosis develop a form of liver cancer known as hepatocellular carcinoma. According to Tilg et al., the gut microbiome could very well have an effect, be involved in the pathophysiology, on the various types of liver disease which an individual may encounter. Insight into the exact causes and mechanisms mediating pathophysiology of the liver is quickly progressing due to the introduction new technological approaches like Single cell sequencing and kinome profiling

=== Air pollutants ===
Particulate matter or carbon black are common pollutants. They have a direct toxic effect on the liver; cause inflammation of the liver, caused by and thereby impacting lipid metabolism and fatty liver disease; and can translocate from the lungs to the liver.Because particulate matter and carbon black are very diverse and each has different toxicodynamics, the detailed mechanisms of translocation are unclear. Water-soluble fractions of particulate matter are the most important part of translocation to the liver through extrapulmonary circulation. When particulate matter gets into the bloodstream, it combines with immune cells and stimulates innate immune responses. Pro-inflammatory cytokines are released and cause disease progression.

== Diagnosis ==
Several liver function tests are available to test the proper function of the liver. These tests for the presence of enzymes in blood that are normally most abundant in liver tissue, metabolites, or products. serum proteins, serum albumin, serum globulin, alanine transaminase, aspartate transaminase, prothrombin time, partial thromboplastin time.

Imaging tests such as transient elastography, ultrasound, and magnetic resonance imaging can be used to show the liver tissue and the bile ducts. Liver biopsy can be performed to examine liver tissue to distinguish between various conditions; tests such as elastography may reduce the need for biopsy in some situations.

In liver disease, prothrombin time is longer than usual. In addition, the amounts of both coagulation factors and anticoagulation factors are reduced as a diseased liver cannot productively synthesize them as it did when healthy. Nonetheless, there are two exceptions in this falling tendency: coagulation factor VIII and von Willebrand factor, a platelet adhesive protein. Both inversely rise in the setting of hepatic insufficiency, thanks to the drop of hepatic clearance and compensatory productions from other sites of the body. Fibrinolysis generally proceeds faster with acute liver failure and advanced stage liver disease, unlike chronic liver disease in which concentration of fibrinogen remains unchanged.A previously undiagnosed liver disease may become evident first after autopsy.

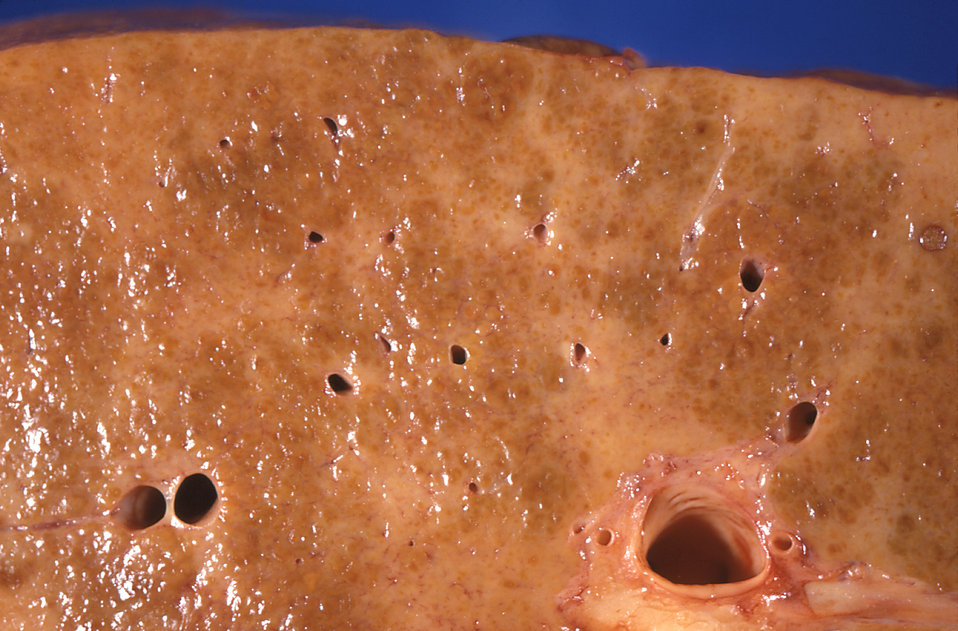
Diffuse cirrhosis

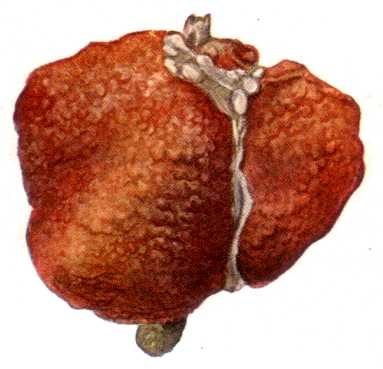
Macronodular cirrhosis

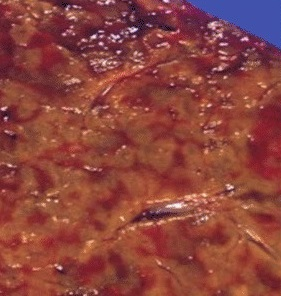
Nutmeg texture of congestive hepatopathy

== Treatment ==
Ursodeoxycholic acid

Anti-viral medications are available to treat infections such as hepatitis B. Other conditions may be managed by slowing down disease progression, for example:

- By using steroid-based drugs in autoimmune hepatitis.
- Regularly removing a quantity of blood from a vein (venesection) in the iron overload condition, hemochromatosis.
- Wilson's disease, a condition where copper builds up in the body, can be managed with drugs that bind copper, allowing it to be passed from the body in urine.
- In cholestatic liver disease, (where the flow of bile is affected due to cystic fibrosis) a medication called ursodeoxycholic acid may be given.

== Epidemiology ==
Death rate from liver disease Map

Liver diseases, including conditions such as metabolic dysfunction–associated steatotic liver disease (MASLD), alcohol-related liver disease (ALD), and viral hepatitis, are significant public health concerns worldwide. In the United States, MASLD is the most common chronic liver condition, affecting approximately 24% of the population, with the prevalence rising due to increasing rates of obesity and metabolic syndrome. Alcohol-related liver disease accounts for about 4.5% of liver-related deaths globally, underscoring the substantial burden of alcohol misuse. Viral hepatitis, primarily hepatitis B and hepatitis C, remains a leading cause of liver cirrhosis and liver cancer worldwide, despite advances in antiviral therapies and vaccination efforts. Additionally, recent studies have highlighted lean steatotic liver disease (SLD), a subset of MASLD, affecting over 12% of U.S. adults even in the absence of obesity. These data emphasize the importance of early detection and targeted interventions to manage liver disease and its associated complications effectively. Under the new definition of MAFLD, counts of global prevalence jumped to over 50%.

New research reports the prevalence of lean steatotic liver disease (SLD) in the United States using data from the National Health and Nutrition Examination Survey (2017-2023). Researchers estimated the age-adjusted prevalence of lean SLD at 12.8%. This includes 9.3% for lean metabolic dysfunction-associated steatotic liver disease, 1.3% for metabolic dysfunction and alcohol-related steatotic liver disease, and 1.0% for alcohol-related liver disease.

== See also ==
- Model for end-stage liver disease (MELD)
