= Lanifibranor =

Chemical compound

- Molecular structure of lanifibranor

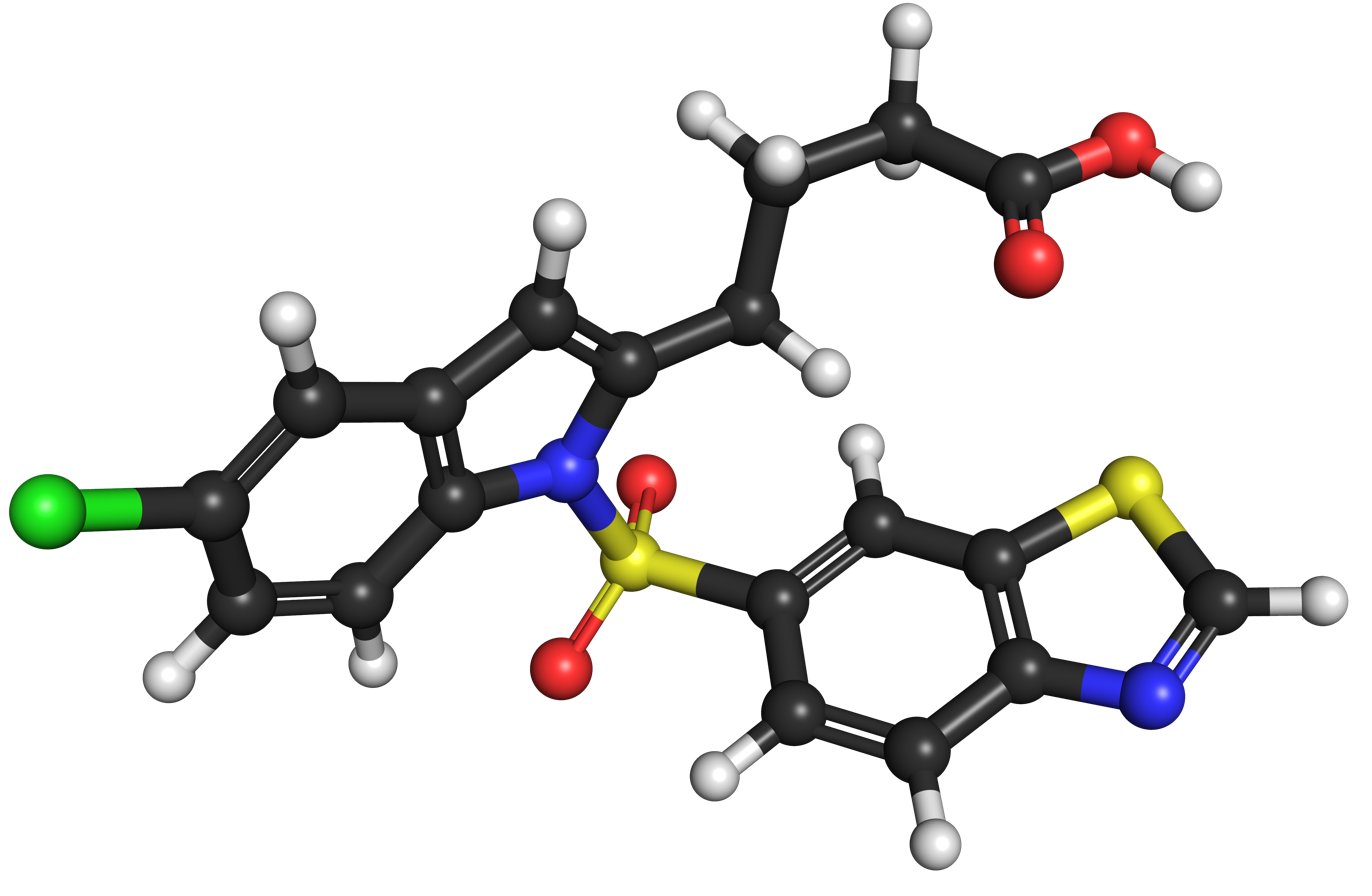
- 3D representation of a lanifibranor molecule

Identifiers
- IUPAC name: 4-[1-(1,3-Benzothiazol-6-ylsulfonyl)-5-chloroindol-2-yl]butanoic acid
- CAS Number: 927961-18-0
- PubChem CID: 68677842
- DrugBank: DB14801
- ChemSpider: 58828074
- UNII: 28Q8AG0PYL
- KEGG: D13335
- ChEMBL: ChEMBL4091374
- ECHA InfoCard: 100.218.645

Chemical and physical data
- Formula: C_{19}H_{15}ClN_{2}O_{4}S_{2}
- Molar mass: 434.91 g·mol^{−1}
- 3D model (JSmol): Interactive image
- SMILES: C1=CC2=C(C=C1S(=O)(=O)N3C4=C(C=C(C=C4)Cl)C=C3CCCC(=O)O)SC=N2
- InChI: InChI=1S/C19H15ClN2O4S2/c20-13-4-7-17-12(8-13)9-14(2-1-3-19(23)24)22(17)28(25,26)15-5-6-16-18(10-15)27-11-21-16/h4-11H,1-3H2,(H,23,24); Key:OQDQIFQRNZIEEJ-UHFFFAOYSA-N

Lanifibranor is a pan-peroxisome proliferator-activated receptor (PPAR) agonist and is the first medication that targets PPAR-alpha, PPAR-beta, and PPAR-gamma simultaneously. As of 2023, it is in a phase III trial for nonalcoholic steatohepatitis; its advantage over other drugs that are in phase III trials for the same condition is that it has shown improvements in both steatohepatitis and fibrosis.
