= Glutamate rich 5 =

Protein-coding gene in the species Homo sapiens

ERICH5

Identifiers
- Aliases: ERICH5, C8orf47, glutamate rich 5
- External IDs: MGI: 2447772; GeneCards: ERICH5

Gene location (Human)
Chr.	Chromosome 8 (human)
Band	8q22.2	Start	98,064,522 bp
Band	8q22.2	End	98,093,610 bp

Gene location (Mouse)
Chr.	Chromosome 15 (mouse)
Band	15|15 B3.1	Start	34,453,451 bp
Band	15|15 B3.1	End	34,474,038 bp
RNA expression pattern
Bgee	Human / Mouse (ortholog); Top expressed in: palpebral conjunctiva; bronchial epithelial cell; islet of Langerhans; mucosa of paranasal sinus; body of pancreas; olfactory zone of nasal mucosa; right uterine tube; gallbladder; testicle; oocyte / Top expressed in: zygote; primary oocyte; secondary oocyte; lens; neural layer of retina; stomach; embryo; dentate gyrus of hippocampal formation granule cell; duodenum; morula; More reference expression data
BioGPS	n/a
Orthologs
Databases	NCBI: entry; OMA: entry
Species	Human	Mouse
Entrez	203111	239368
Ensembl	ENSG00000177459	ENSMUSG00000044726
UniProt	Q6P6B1	Q8K0S2
RefSeq (mRNA)	NM_173549; NM_001170806	NM_173421
RefSeq (protein)	NP_001164277; NP_775820	NP_775597
Location (UCSC)	Chr 8: 98.06 – 98.09 Mb	Chr 15: 34.45 – 34.47 Mb
PubMed search
- Wikidata
View/Edit Human	View/Edit Mouse

Glutamate rich protein 5 is a protein in humans encoded by the ERICH5 gene, also known as chromosome 8 open reading frame 47 (C8orf47).

== Gene ==
The ERICH5 gene is located on human chromosome 8 at 8q22.2 and spans 29 kb on the plus strand of the DNA. ERICH5 contains three exons and two introns. ERICH5 is also known as C8orf47 and glutamate rich 5.

== Protein ==
=== Isoforms ===
The ERICH5 protein has two isoforms. The longest isofrom, isofrom 1, spans 1,550 base pairs and is composed of 374 amino acids. The second isoform lacks the third and final exon and is 596 base pairs long.

=== Domains and motifs ===
ERICH5 contains one conserved domain, a domain of unknown function called DUF4573. ERICH5 is predicted to contain two highly conserved motifs, an APC/C binding motif and the LIG_FHA_2 motif. The APC/C motif spans amino acid 222-226 and serves as a binding site for the anaphase-promoting complex. The LIG_FHA_2 motif is involved in the cell checkpoint pathway and is found in many proteins localized in the nucleus that regulate cell cycle.

=== Post-translational modifications ===
ERICH5 is predicted to undergo several post-translational modifications including phosphorylation, O-glycosylation, and sumoylation. Many of the phosphorylation sites and O-glycosylation sites were predicted at the same amino acid. The post translational modifications shown are those conserved among ERICH5 orthologs. Several kinases were predicted to phosphorylate ERICH5 including PKC, cdc2, CKI, PKA, DNAPK, ATM, EGFR, and CKII.

Post-translational modification	Amino acid location
Phosphorylation	S4, S5, S27, S32, S49, T50, S58, S100, T101, T104, T138, S169, S227, S234, T239, T248, S274, T289, S307, Y320, T340, T346
O-Glycosylation	S5, S27, S32, S49, T50, S58, S100, T101, T104, T138, S169, S227, S234, T239, T248, S274, T289, S307
Sumoylation	K121, K131, K211, K251, K343, K360

=== Secondary structure ===
ERICH5 was predicted to contain three alpha helices and two beta sheets as well as regions of random coils.

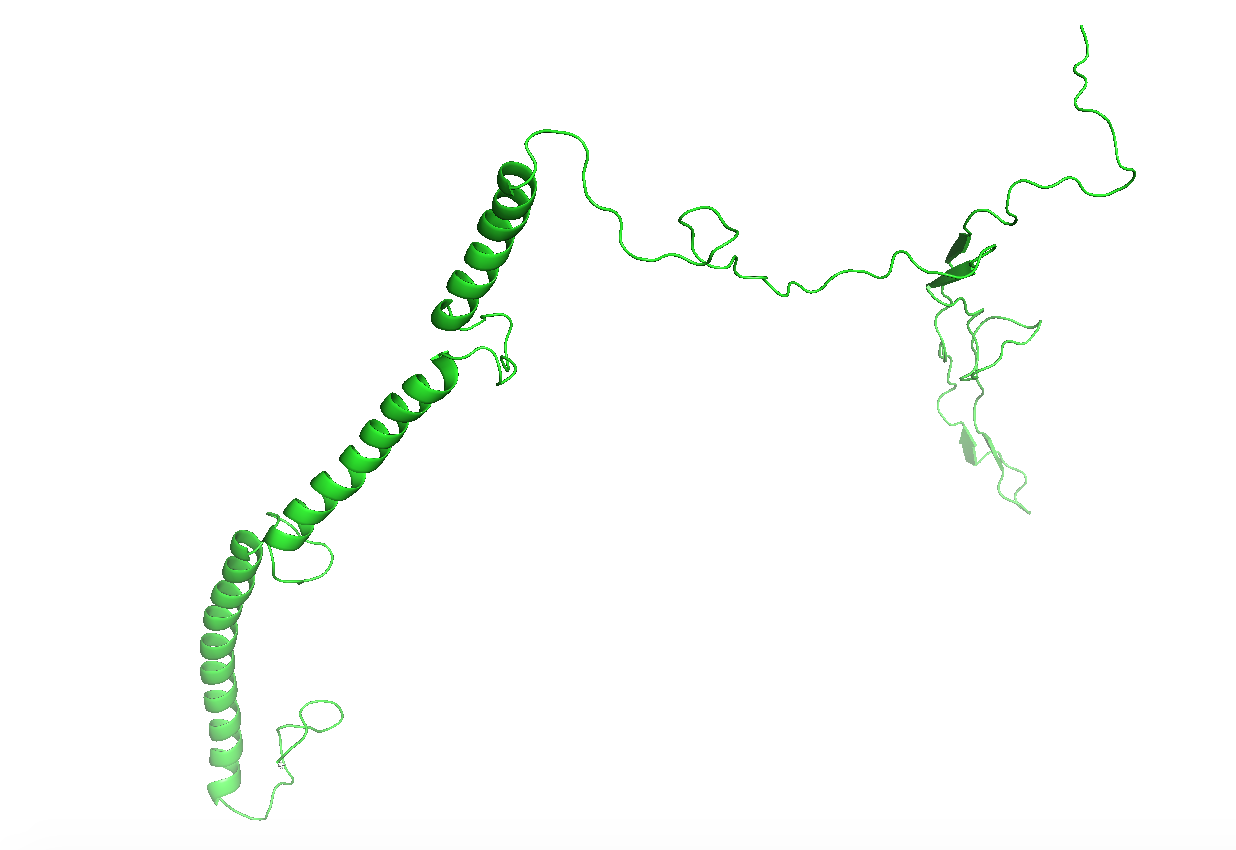
ERICH5 secondary structure.

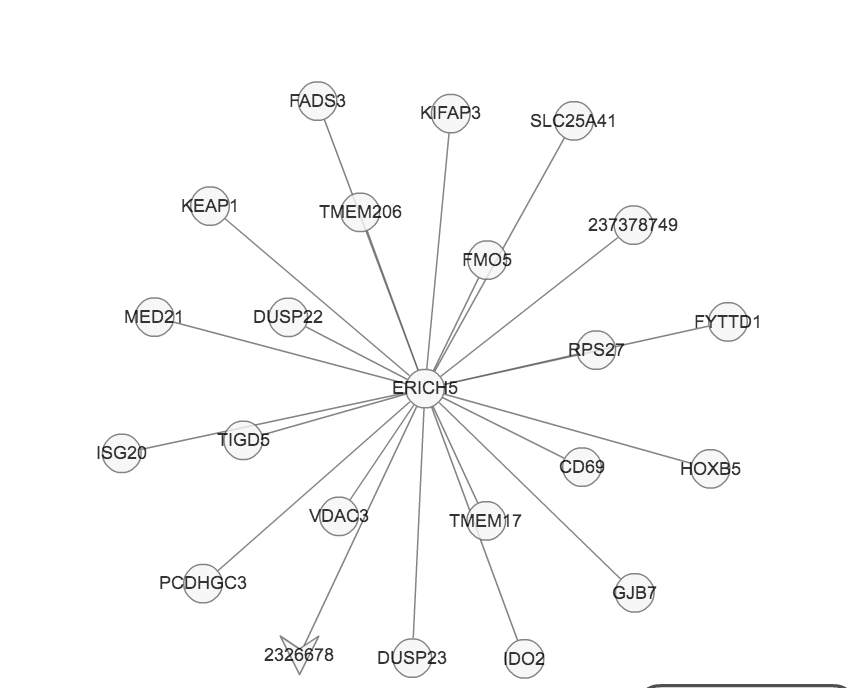
ERICH5 protein interactions.

=== Sub-cellular localization ===
ERICH5 was predicted to be localized in the nucleus.

=== Protein interactions ===
ERICH5 was predicted to interact with several proteins through yeast two-hybrid screening and affinity chromatography. Several of the proteins ERICH5 was predicted to interact with were also localized in the nucleus.

== Expression ==
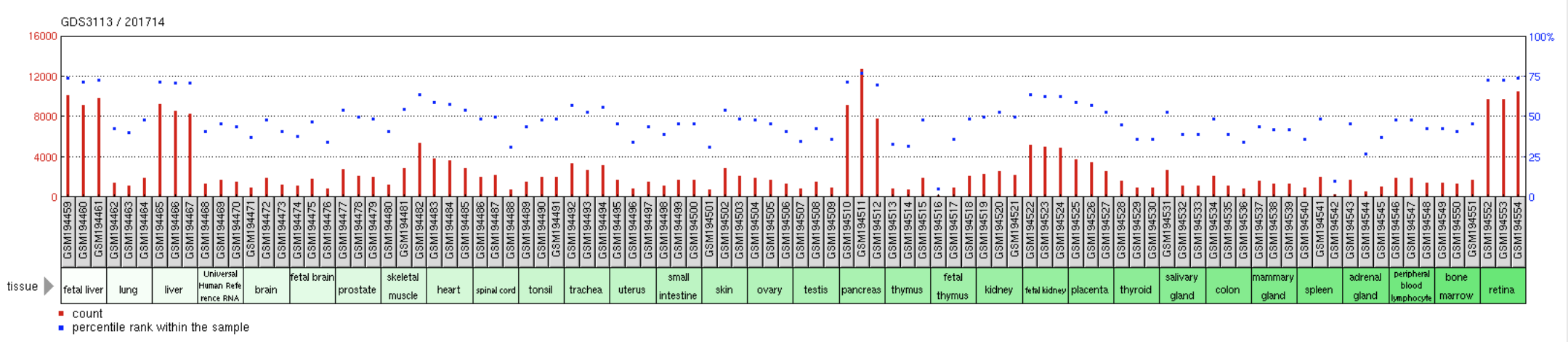
Normal expression of ERICH5 in various tissues.

=== Normal expression ===
ERICH5 shows elevated levels of expression in the fetal liver, liver, pancreas, and retina compared to other tissues.

=== Expression in disease ===
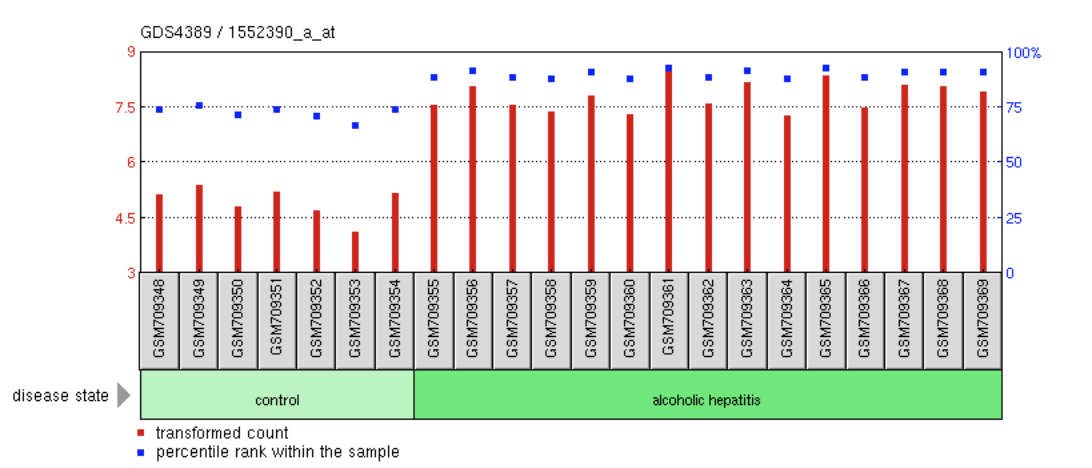
Expression of ERICH5 in alcoholic hepatitis.

ERICH5 shows increased expression in Alcoholic Hepatitis.

== Homology ==
=== Paralogs ===
There are no known paralogs of ERICH5.

=== Orthologs ===
True orthologs of ERICH5 have only been identified among mammalian species. The most distantly related mammalian ortholog is in Monodelphis domestica, or the gray short-tailed opossum.

Species name	Common names	MYA	% similarity	% identity	Accession #	Protein length
Acinonyx jubatus	Cheetah	96	71%	65%	XP_014937513.1	358
Cerathotherium	White rhino	96	71%	66%	XP_004431343.2	358
Trichechus manatus latirostris	Manatee	105	68%	59%	XP_004370879.3	342
Monodelphis	Gray short-tailed opossum	159	40%	28%	XP_007488209.1	478

=== Distant orthologs ===
ERICH5 has distant orthologs among birds and reptiles. These distant orthologs contain only the third exon of ERICH5.

Species name	Common name	MYA	% similarity	% identity	Accession #	Protein length
Gallus gallus	Chicken	312	80%	64%	XP_004940017.1	207
Chysemys picta belli	Painted turtle	312	74%	59%	XP_008166572.1	442
