= AZD2693 =

Clinical data
- Other names: ION839

Legal status
- Legal status: Investigational

Identifiers
- CAS Number: 2603457-19-6

AZD2693 is an antisense therapy developed by AstraZeneca for the treatment of non-alcoholic fatty liver disease based on the PNPLA3 gene, believed to be the largest single genetic risk factor for this condition.
