= Lille Model =

Assessment of the response of alcohol hepatitis to corticosteroid treatment

- Purpose: Assess the response of alcohol hepatitis to corticosteroid treatment
- Based on: Age, albumin, Bilirubin (initial), Bilirubin (day 7), Creatinine, Prothrombin time
- Lille Score < 0.45: continue steroid therapy Lille Score ≥ 0.45: discontinue steroid therapy

The Lille Model is a validated clinical scoring system that was developed to identify non responders to steroid therapy in patients with alcoholic hepatitis. The model is a dynamic scoring system that calculates a score after 7 days of corticosteroid therapy in order to identify patients who are not responding to treatment and have a high risk of short term mortality. Because non responders have poor outcomes, the model serves as a useful predictor of mortality. This early identification allows clinicians to consider alternative therapies, stopping ineffective therapies to avoid side effects, and to evaluate for early liver transplantation.

== Background ==
Severe alcoholic hepatitis carries a high mortality rate with some studies demonstrating a 28 day mortality risk of 30-50% in untreated patients. Corticosteroids (such as prednisolone) are the mainstay of pharmacologic treatment for patients with severe alcoholic hepatitis, which is typically defined by a Maddrey’s Discriminant Function (MDF) score of 32 or greater or a MELD score >20. Importantly, up to 40% of patients do not respond to this initial corticosteroid therapy. In non responding patients, continuing steroids carries risks associated with the drug's side effects, such as increased risk of infection, while not offering any increased survival benefit. This may also delay the consideration of other live saving interventions such as liver transplantation.

The Lille Model is named after the French city of Lille, the home base of the research team led by Philippe Mathurin, MD, PhD, who was the primary author of the Lille model's key validation study. Dr. Mathurin is a Professor of Hepatology and serves as the head of the Liver Disease and Research Program within the Department of Hepatology and Gastroenterology at the University of Hospital of Lille, France. Dr. Mathurin has been an associate editor for the Journal of Hepatology since 2009 and his extensive research portfolio includes significant contributions to understanding and treatment of alcoholic liver disease, viral hepatitis, non alcoholic fatty liver disease, and hepatocellular carcinoma.

== The model and calculation ==
The Lille model was initially derived from a study of 238 patients and published in Hepatology in 2003. It was further validated in a cohort study in 2007. It uses six factors and computes a score that ranges from 0 to 1. The score is calculated using the values and formula listed below, which is complex and often determined using many available online calculators (e.g., https://www.lillemodel.com, MDCalc), or a nomogram in clinical practice.

- Age (in years)
- Albumin (g/L) at baseline (day 0)
- Bilirubin (µmol/L) at baseline (day 0)
- Bilirubin (µmol/L) at day 7
- Creatinine (µmol/L) at baseline (day 0)
- Prothrombin time (seconds) or international normalized ratio (INR) at baseline

Formula:

Lille Model Score = (exp(-R)) / (1 + exp(-R))

with the variables being defines as the following:

R = 3.19 - 0.101 * (age, years) + 0.147 * (albumin day 0, g/L) + 0.0165 * (bilirubin level day 7, µmol/L) - 0.206 * (renal insufficiency) - 0.0065 *(bilirubin level day 0, µmol/L) - 0.0096 * (PT, sec)

Renal insufficiency = 1 (if Cr >1.3 mg/dL (115 µmol/L)) or 0 (if ≤1.3 mg/dL (115 µmol/L))

== Clinical application and interpretation ==
The Lille score is interpreted on a continuous scale with higher scores indicating a poorer response to corticosteroids and a worse prognosis. The 2007 validation study established a cutoff score of 0.45, which defines the non responders to the corticosteroid therapy. This has been widely adopted in clinical practice and subsequent guidelines.

- Lille Score < 0.45: This indicates that patients are responders to the steroid therapy. Continuing a full 28 day course of corticosteroids is associated with significantly improved survival in these patients.
  - Scores < 0.45 predict a 6 month survival rate of 85%.
- Lille Score ≥ 0.45: This indicates that patients are non responders. Continuing steroid therapy in these patients provides no benefit and is associated with a very high 6 month mortality rate (often >50%). The 2019 AASLD Practice Guidance recommends that for patients in this score range, the Lille score should be used to guide the treatment course by stopping the corticosteroid treatments and alternative options should be explored. These options include evaluation for early liver transplantation and clinical trial enrollment.
  - Scores ≥ 0.45 predict a 6 month survival rate of 25%.

The model is more effective when used in conjunction with other prognostic scoring tools such as the Maddrey’s Discriminant Function (MDF) or the Model for End Stage Liver Disease (MELD) score. These tools are used to diagnose severe alcoholic hepatitis and initiate steroid treatments. The combination of these models, such as MELD plus Lille can enhance prediction of mortality in these patients.

== Role in early liver transplantation ==
The Lille model plays a crucial role in the emerging strategy of early liver transplantation for severe alcoholic hepatitis. Landmark studies have demonstrated that patients with severe alcoholic hepatitis who do not respond to medical therapy (as identified by the Lille score) may receive excellent post transplant survival and low rates of alcohol relapse when selected using rigorous psychosocial criteria.

The 2019 AASLD guidance states that liver transplantation may be considered in carefully selected patients with favorable psychosocial profiles in severe alcoholic hepatitis not responding to medical therapy, with the Lille score being a key tool used to identify the non responding patients.

== See also ==
- Model for End-Stage Liver Disease
- Modified Maddrey's discriminant function
- Child–Pugh score
