= Alcoholic hepatitis =

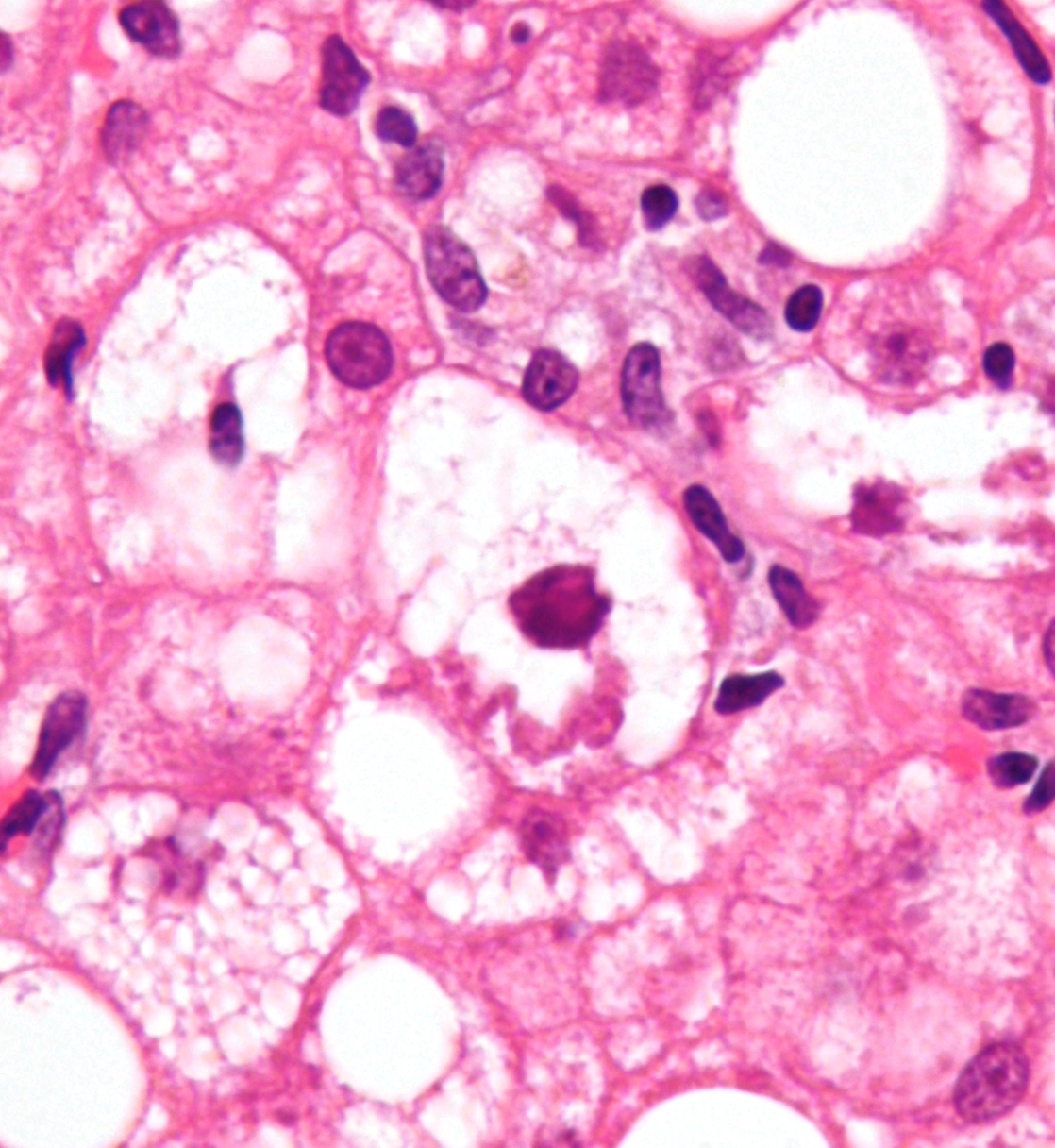
- Micrograph showing a Mallory body, a histopathologic finding associated with alcoholic hepatitis. H&E stain.
- Specialty: Gastroenterology
- Complications: Cirrhosis, kidney failure, confusion, drowsiness and slurred speech (hepatic encephalopathy), ascites, enlarged veins (varices)
- Risk factors: Sex, obesity, genetic factors, race and ethnicity, binge drinking

Alcoholic hepatitis is hepatitis (inflammation of the liver) due to excessive intake of alcohol. Patients typically have a history of at least 10 years of heavy alcohol intake, typically 8–10 drinks per day. It is usually found in association with fatty liver, an early stage of alcoholic liver disease, and may contribute to the progression of fibrosis, leading to cirrhosis. Symptoms may present acutely after a large amount of alcoholic intake in a short time period, or after years of excess alcohol intake. Signs and symptoms of alcoholic hepatitis include jaundice (yellowing of the skin and eyes), ascites (fluid accumulation in the abdominal cavity), fatigue and hepatic encephalopathy (brain dysfunction due to liver failure). Mild cases are self-limiting, but severe cases have a high risk of death. Severity in alcoholic hepatitis is determined several clinical prediction models such as the Maddrey's Discriminant Function and the MELD score.

Severe cases may be treated with glucocorticoids with a response rate of about 60%. The condition often comes on suddenly and may progress in severity very rapidly.

== Signs and symptoms ==
Alcoholic hepatitis is characterized by a number of symptoms, which may include feeling unwell, enlargement of the liver, development of fluid in the abdomen (ascites), and modest elevation of liver enzyme levels (as determined by liver function tests). It may also present with Hepatic encephalopathy (brain dysfunction due to liver failure) causing symptoms such as confusion, decreased levels of consciousness, or asterixis, (a characteristic flapping movement when the wrist is extended indicative of hepatic encephalopathy). Severe cases are characterized by profound acute onset jaundice, obtundation (ranging from drowsiness to unconsciousness), and progressive critical illness; the mortality rate is 50% within 30 days of onset despite best care.

Patients with alcoholic hepatitis can also present with alcohol withdrawal symptoms secondary to abstaining from alcohol in the setting of alcohol dependence. Alcohol withdrawal symptoms can include tremors, tachycardia, and progress to seizures or delirium in severe withdrawal. Similarly, patients with alcoholic hepatitis can present with long-term effects of alcohol in heavy, chronic alcohol users like Dupuytren contraction and temporal muscle wasting.

Alcoholic hepatitis is distinct from cirrhosis caused by long-term alcohol consumption. Alcoholic hepatitis can occur in patients with chronic alcoholic liver disease and alcoholic cirrhosis. Alcoholic hepatitis by itself does not lead to cirrhosis, but cirrhosis is more common in patients with long term alcohol consumption. Patients with alcoholic hepatitis and concomitant cirrhosis may present with cirrhosis stigmata like jaundice, palmar erythema, spider angiomata. Some alcoholics develop acute hepatitis as an inflammatory reaction to the cells affected by fatty change. This is not directly related to the dose of alcohol. Some people seem more prone to this reaction than others. This inflammatory reaction to the fatty change is called alcoholic steatohepatitis and the inflammation probably predisposes to liver fibrosis by activating hepatic stellate cells to produce collagen.

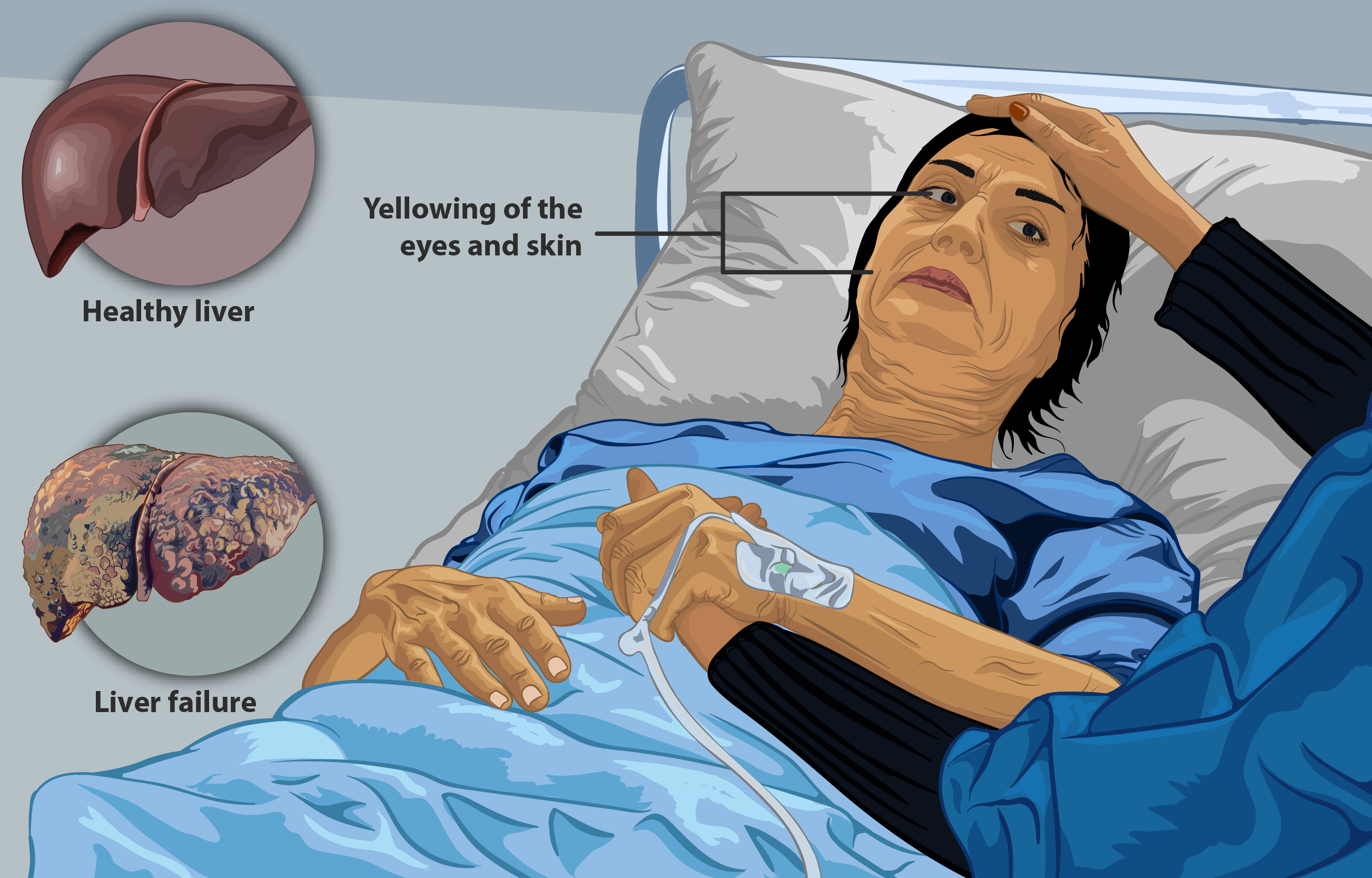
Depiction of a liver failure patient

=== Complications ===
Patients with alcoholic hepatitis can develop infections, acute kidney injuries that may lead to hepatorenal syndrome, and cirrhosis complications. If there is clinical suspicion of infection in the setting of alcoholic hepatitis, it is important to screen for sepsis SIRS criteria and order blood cultures. If sepsis is confirmed, the patient should be immediately transferred to the ICU for high level of care. Similarly, to avoid kidney complications, preferably elect to manage the patient with non-nephrotoxic medications when and if necessary. Additionally, use diuretics sparingly to avoid causing or exacerbating the patients acute kidney injury.

== Pathophysiology ==
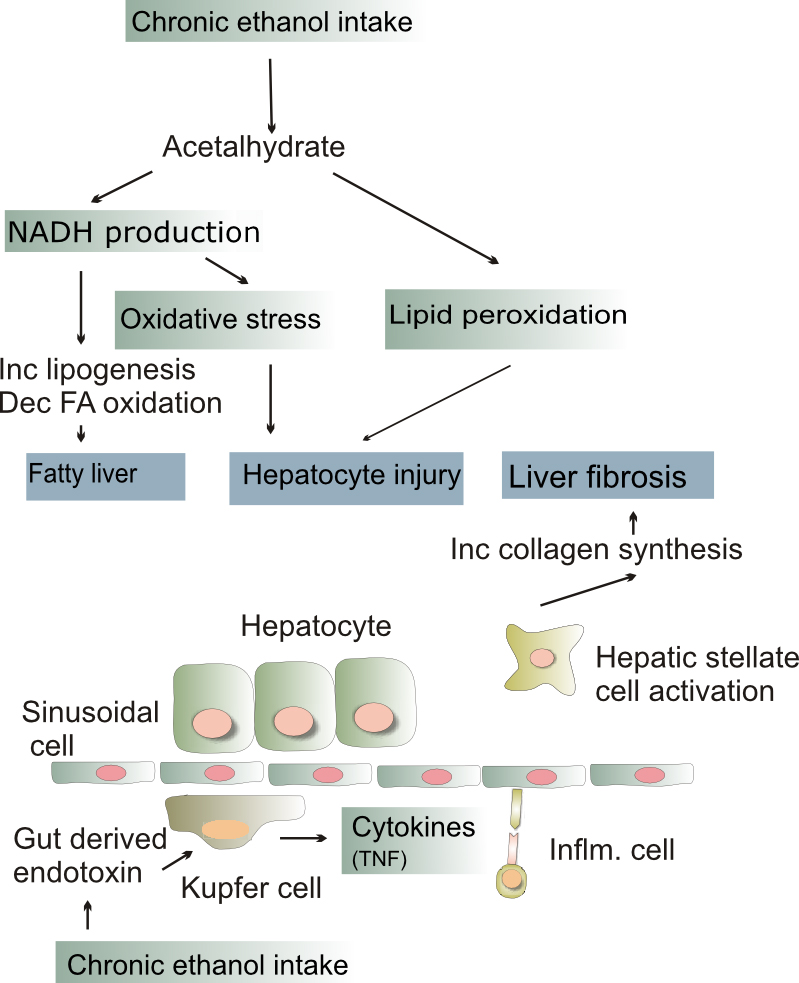
Pathogenesis alcoholic liver injury

Alcohol related liver disease

The pathological mechanisms in alcoholic hepatitis are incompletely understood but a combination of direct hepatocyte damage by alcohol and its metabolites in addition to increased intestinal permeability are thought to play a role. Heavy alcohol consumption increases intestinal permeability by causing direct damage to enterocytes (intestinal absorptive cells) and causing disruptions of tight junctions that form a barrier between the enterocytes. This leads to increased intestinal permeability which then leads to pathogenic gut bacteria (such as enterococcus faecalis) or immunogenic fungi entering the portal circulation, and travelling to the liver where they cause hepatocyte damage. In the case of enterococcus faecalis, the bacterium can release an exotoxin which is directly damaging to liver cells. Chronic alcohol consumption may alter the gut microbiome and promote the production of these pathogenic bacteria. Many of these pathogenic bacteria also contain Pathogen Associated Molecular Patterns (PAMPs), extracellular motifs that are recognized by the immune system as foreign material, which may lead to an exaggerated inflammatory response in the liver which further leads to hepatocyte damage.

Alcohol is also directly damaging to liver cells. Alcohol is metabolized to acetaldehyde in the liver via the enzymes CYP2E1 and aldehyde dehydrogenase. Acetaldehyde forms reactive oxygen species in the liver as well as acting as a DNA adduct (binding to DNA) leading to direct hepatocyte damage. This manifests as lipid peroxidation, mitochondrial damage, and glutathione (an endogenous antioxidant) depletion. Damaged hepatocytes release Danger associated molecular patterns (DAMPs) which are molecules that lead to further activation of the immune system's inflammatory response and further hepatocyte damage.

The chronic inflammation seen in alcoholic hepatitis leads to a distinctive fibrotic response, with fibrogenic cell type activation. This occurs via an increased extracellular matrix deposition around hepatocytes and sinusoidal cells which causes a peri-cellular fibrosis known as "chickenwire fibrosis". This peri-cellular chickenwire fibrosis leads to portal hypertension or an elevated blood pressure in the portal veins that drain blood from the intestines to the liver. This causes many of the sequelae of chronic liver disease including esophageal varices (with associated variceal bleeding), ascites and splenomegaly.

The chronic inflammation seen in alcoholic hepatitis also leads to impaired hepatocyte differentiation, impairments in hepatocyte regeneration and hepatocyte de-differentiation into cholangiocyte type cells. This leads to defects in the liver's many functions including impairments in bilirubin transport, clotting factor synthesis, glucose metabolism and immune dysfunction. This impaired compensatory liver regenerative response further leads to a ductular reaction; a type of abnormal liver cell architecture.

Due to the release of DAMPs and PAMPs, an acute systemic inflammatory state can develop after extensive alcohol intake that dominates the clinical landscape of acute severe alcoholic hepatitis. IL-6 has been shown to have the most robust increase among pro-inflammatory mediators in these patients. Furthermore, decreased levels of IL-13, an antagonistic cytokine of IL-6 was found to be closely associated with short-term (90-day) mortality in severe alcoholic hepatitis patients.

Some signs and pathological changes in liver histology include:

- Mallory's hyaline body – a condition where pre-keratin filaments accumulate in hepatocytes. This sign is not limited to alcoholic liver disease, but is often characteristic.
- Ballooning degeneration – hepatocytes in the setting of alcoholic change often swell up with excess fat, water and protein; normally these proteins are exported into the bloodstream. Accompanied with ballooning, there is necrotic damage. The swelling is capable of blocking nearby biliary ducts, leading to diffuse cholestasis.
- Inflammation – neutrophilic invasion is triggered by the necrotic changes and presence of cellular debris within the lobules. Ordinarily the amount of debris is removed by Kupffer cells, although in the setting of inflammation they become overloaded, allowing other white cells to spill into the parenchyma. These cells are particularly attracted to hepatocytes with Mallory bodies.

If chronic liver disease is also present:

- Fibrosis
- Cirrhosis – a progressive and permanent type of fibrotic degeneration of liver tissue.

== Diagnosis ==
The diagnosis of alcoholic hepatitis is largely a clinical diagnosis and can be classified into three categories: Definite, Probable, and Possible alcoholic hepatitis. A patient with definite alcoholic hepatitis will fulfill clinical diagnostic criteria and present with a convincing history of chronic alcohol usage and a confirmatory liver biopsy. Patients with probable alcoholic hepatitis will meet clinical diagnostic criteria without the influence of confounding factors, and those with possible alcoholic hepatitis will present with a clinical diagnosis influenced by confounding factors. Confounding factors to consider in this patient population include an unclear history of alcohol usage, conflicting lab results, and clinical comorbidities that may cause liver disease like Drug-indiced liver injury, infection, and viral, hepatitis.

Clinical suspicion of alcoholic hepatitis should be considered in patients with a history of significant chronic alcohol intake who develops worsening liver function tests, and onset of jaundice within the last 8 weeks. Additional inclusion criteria for alcoholic hepatitis includes a history of 6 months or more of continued alcohol intake, specifically >40 (female) or 60 (males) g alcohol/day, in patients who develop jaundice within less than 60 days of abstinence.

Initial diagnostic work-up includes ordering routine labs and imaging including: liver function tests, complete blood count, basic metabolic panel, and a right upper quadrant ultrasound. The liver function tests will often result in elevated total bilirubin (typically greater than 3.0 mg/dL), aminotransferases that do not exceed 400 IU/L, and an aspartate aminotransferase to alanine aminotransferase ratio of usually 2 or more. A CBC may be ordered to assess for acute inflammatory responses (presenting as leukocytosis and or thrombocytosis) and signs of toxic alcoholic effects on the liver and bone marrow (presenting as thrombocytopenia and or macrocytic anemia). A BMP may be helpful to evaluate for a concomitant acute kidney injury and hepatorenal syndrome. Furthermore, a RUQ ultrasound can help confirm the diagnosis of alcoholic hepatitis if the patient presents with findings suggestive of hepatic steatosis, hepatomegaly, and or cirrhosis. The RUQ ultrasound is also a helpful diagnostic tool used to rule out similarly presenting hepatic pathologies like gallstones and hepatocellular carinoma.

Confirmatory studies include a transjugular liver biopsy. A liver biopsy is not required for the diagnosis, however it can help confirm alcoholic hepatitis as the cause of the hepatitis if the diagnosis is unclear. In patients presenting with an unclear history of alcohol consumption and confounding factors, a transjugular liver biopsy may be helpful to clarify clinical management.

== Management ==
=== Abstinence and Alcohol Withdrawal ===
The management of alcoholic hepatitis is aims to stabilize the acute on chronic liver injury to prevent further sequelae of the condition. The most important intervention to promote recovery is encouraging the patient to discontinue alcohol consumption. Abstinence from alcohol is pivotal to prevent further progression into more severe liver pathologies like alcoholic-cirrhosis or hepatocellular carcinoma. This patient population by definition also presents with a chronic history of alcohol usage, so these patients should be monitored for symptoms associated with alcoholic withdrawal syndrome and undergo a CIWA-Ar screening. Patients should be managed accordingly with Long or Short acting Benzodiazepines depending on their clinical comorbidities and specific presentation of withdrawal symptoms. In addition to managing their withdrawal symptoms, these patients should also be offered counseling services to prevent relapses and further liver damage.

=== Malnutrition ===
Chronic alcohol users are also at risk for malnutrition secondary to protein and calorie deficiencies. Patients with alcoholic hepatitis commonly present with these nutritional deficiencies so it is important to perform a throughout history and physical exam to clinically correlate findings. Additionally, the patient may also benefit from the aid of a dietician for nutritional support because malnutrition negatively affects these patient's clinical outcomes. Improved nutrition has been shown to improve liver function and reduce incidences encephalopathy and infections. Current clinical guidelines recommend daily intake of 1.2-1.5 g/kg of protein and 35-40 kcal/kg of calories for patients suffering from alcoholic hepatitis.

=== Pharmacologic interventions ===
Pharmacologic interventions for alcoholic hepatitis mainly consist on the use of corticosteroids. Indications for corticosteroids are based on prognostic scoring models like the MELD score and modified Maddrey's discriminant function (MDF). High scores (MELD > 20 or MDF >32) and or evidence of hepatic encephalopathy indicate the patient is suffering from severe alcoholic hepatitis and thus requires corticosteroids for acute stabilization of their condition. Clinical guidelines recommend using the MELD score over the MDF as it offers better predictions of the patient's mortality in the setting of liver failure. Furthermore, the Lille Model is another prognostic tool used to monitor for the patient's response to corticosteroid treatment. A Lille score > 0.45 indicates an inadequate response to treatment and entails transitioning to palliative care or enrolling the patient for an early liver transplantation. Patients scoring below 0.45 should be treated with the standard corticosteroid regimen. Generally, alcoholic hepatitis patients who require corticosteroids are started on prednisolone for a month, followed by a two week taper. Alternative corticosteroids include off-label IV Methlyprednisolone.

Other pharmacologic interventions include usage of IV N-acetlycystine and previouslyPentoxifylline. Intravenous N-acetylcysteine, when used in conjunction with corticosteroids, improves survival at 28 days by decreasing rates of infection and hepatorenal syndrome. Systematic reviews comparing the treatment of pentoxifylline with corticosteroids show there is no benefit to treatment with pentoxifylline. Potential for combined therapy: A large prospective study of over 1000 patients investigated whether prednisolone and pentoxifylline produced benefits when used alone or in combination. Pentoxifylline did not improve survival alone or in combination. Prednisolone gave a small reduction in mortality at 28 days but this did not reach significance, and there were no improvements in outcomes at 90 days or 1 year.

=== Liver Transplantation ===
Last-line therapy involves liver transplantation. Early liver transplantation is ideal and helps to save lives. Early liver transplantation should be recommended to patients who do not respond to medical management. This may be evident through a high Lille score or patients who further decompensate and develop complications of alcoholic hepatitis. Patients who clinically qualify for a liver transplantation should be evaluated by a transplant committee to determine if they are good candidates. Most transplant providers in the United States require a period of alcohol abstinence (typically six months) prior to transplant, but the ethics and science behind this are controversial.

=== Determining Disposition ===
The patient's disposition is also important to consider throughout their care. If a patient with alcoholic hepatitis exhibits evidence of infection, hemodynamic instability, sepsis, signs of hepatic encephalopathy, and or extra-hepatic organ failure, they should be transferred to the ICU. Patients who improve with corticosteroid therapy can be discharged with counseling resources to encourage abstinence and avoid relapses.

== Prognosis ==
Females are more susceptible to alcohol-associated liver injury and are therefore at higher risk of alcohol-associated hepatitis. Certain genetic variations in the PNPLA3-encoding gene, which codes for an enzyme involved in triglyceride metabolism in adipose tissue are thought to influence disease severity. Other factors in alcoholic hepatitis associated with a poor prognosis include concomitant hepatic encephalopathy and acute kidney injury.

== Epidemiology ==
- Alcoholic hepatitis occurs in approximately 1/3 of chronic alcohol drinkers.
- 10-20% of patients with alcoholic hepatitis progress to alcoholic liver cirrhosis every year.
- Patients with liver cirrhosis develop liver cancer at a rate of 1.5% per year.
- In total, 70% of those with alcoholic hepatitis will go on to develop alcoholic liver cirrhosis in their lifetimes.
- Infection risk is elevated in patients with alcoholic hepatitis (12–26%). It increases even higher with use of corticosteroids (50%) when compared with the general population.
- Untreated severe alcoholic hepatitis mortality in one month of presentation may be as high as 40-50%.

== See also ==
- AST/ALT ratio
- Lille Model
- Steatohepatitis
