= Alcoholic liver disease =

- Other names: Alcohol-related liver disease
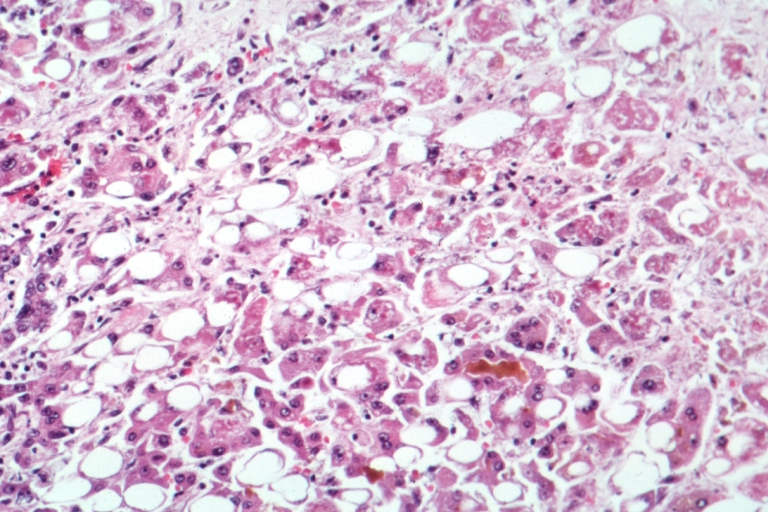
- Microscopy of liver showing fatty change, cell necrosis, Mallory bodies
- Specialty: Gastroenterology

Alcoholic liver disease (ALD), also called alcohol-related liver disease (ARLD), is a term that encompasses the liver manifestations of alcohol overconsumption, including fatty liver, alcoholic hepatitis, and chronic hepatitis with liver fibrosis or cirrhosis.

It is the major cause of liver disease in Western countries, and is the leading cause of death from excessive drinking. Although steatosis (fatty liver disease) will develop in any individual who consumes a large quantity of alcoholic beverages over a long period of time, this process is transient and reversible. More than 90% of all heavy drinkers develop fatty liver whilst about 25% develop the more severe alcoholic hepatitis, and 15% liver cirrhosis.

For patients with chronic hepatitis B, a strict adherence to abstinence from alcohol is highly recommended.

== Risk factors ==
As of 2010, known risk factors of ALD are:

- Quantity of alcohol taken: Consumption of 60–80 g per day (14 g is considered one standard drink in the US, e.g. 1 1/2 US fl oz or 44 mL hard liquor, 5 US fl oz or 150 mL wine, 12 US fl oz or 350 mL beer; drinking a six-pack of 5% ABV beer daily would be 84 g and just over the upper limit) for 20 years or more in men, or 20 g/day for women significantly increases the risk of hepatitis and fibrosis by 6% to 41%.
- Pattern of drinking: Drinking outside of meal times increases up to 3 times the risk of alcoholic liver disease.
- Sex: Women are twice as susceptible to alcohol-related liver disease, and may develop alcoholic liver disease with shorter durations and doses of chronic consumption. The lesser amount of alcohol dehydrogenase secreted in the gut, higher proportion of body fat in women, and changes in alcohol absorption due to the menstrual cycle may explain this phenomenon.
- Ethnicity: Higher rates of alcohol-related liver disease, unrelated to differences in amounts of alcohol consumed, are seen in African-American and Hispanic males compared to Caucasian males.
- Hepatitis C infection: A concomitant hepatitis C infection significantly accelerates the process of liver injury.
- Genetic factors: Genetic factors predispose both to alcoholism and to alcoholic liver disease. Both monozygotic twins are more likely to be alcoholics and to develop liver cirrhosis than both dizygotic twins. Polymorphisms in the enzymes involved in the metabolism of alcohol, such as ADH, ALDH, CYP4502E1, mitochondrial dysfunction, and cytokine polymorphism may partly explain this genetic component. However, no specific polymorphisms have currently been firmly linked to alcoholic liver disease.
- Iron overload (hemochromatosis).
- Diet: Malnutrition, particularly vitamin A and E deficiencies, can worsen alcohol-induced liver damage by preventing regeneration of hepatocytes. This is particularly a concern as alcoholics are usually malnourished because of a poor diet, anorexia, and encephalopathy.

== Pathophysiology ==
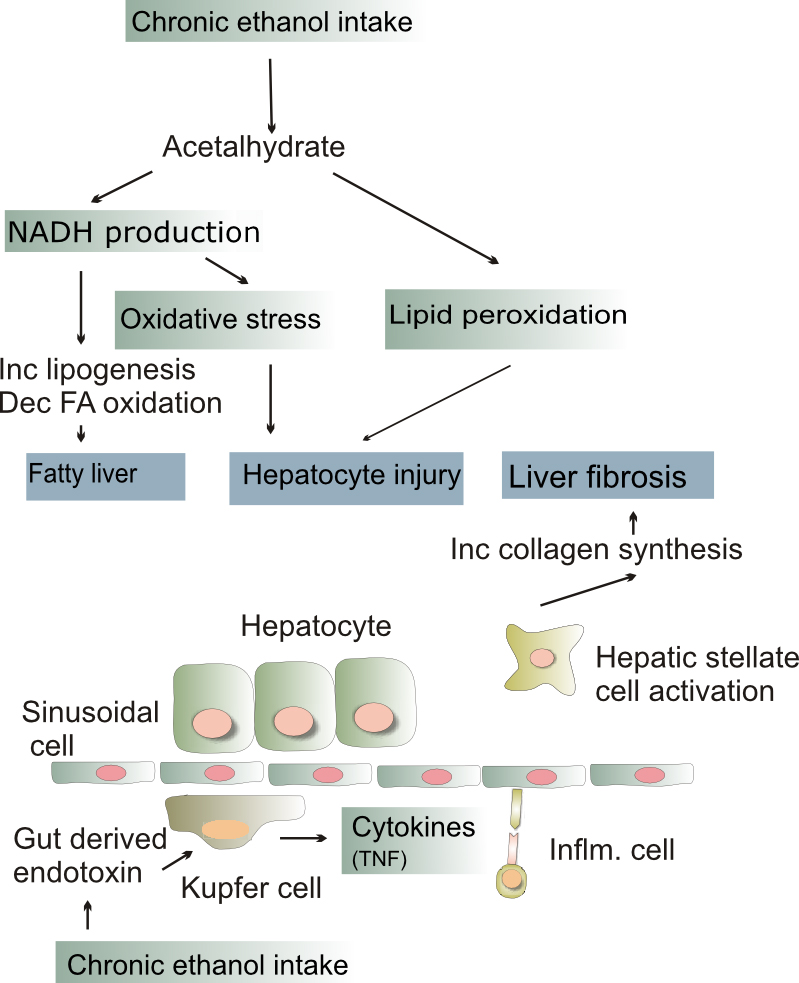
Pathogenesis of alcohol induced liver injury

The mechanism of ALD is not completely understood. 80% of alcohol passes through the liver to be detoxified. Chronic consumption of alcohol results in the secretion of pro-inflammatory cytokines (TNF-alpha, interleukin 6 and interleukin 8), oxidative stress, lipid peroxidation, and acetaldehyde toxicity. These factors cause inflammation, apoptosis and eventually fibrosis of liver cells. Why this occurs in only a few individuals is still unclear. Additionally, the liver has tremendous capacity to regenerate and even when 75% of hepatocytes are dead, it continues to function as normal.

=== Fatty change ===
Fatty change, or steatosis, is the accumulation of fatty acids in liver cells. This can be seen as fatty globules under the microscope. Alcoholism causes development of large fatty globules (macro-vesicular steatosis) throughout the liver and can begin to occur after a few days of heavy drinking. Alcohol is metabolized by alcohol dehydrogenase (ADH) into acetaldehyde, then further metabolized by aldehyde dehydrogenase (ALDH) into acetic acid, which is finally oxidized into carbon dioxide (CO_{2}) and water (H_{2}O). This process generates NADH, and increases the NADH/NAD+ ratio. A higher NADH concentration induces fatty acid synthesis while a decreased NAD level results in decreased fatty acid oxidation. Subsequently, the higher levels of fatty acids signal the liver cells to compound it to glycerol to form triglycerides. These triglycerides accumulate, resulting in fatty liver.

=== Alcoholic hepatitis ===
Alcoholic hepatitis is characterized by the inflammation of hepatocytes. Between 10% and 35% of heavy drinkers develop alcoholic hepatitis (NIAAA, 1993). While development of hepatitis is not directly related to the dose of alcohol, some people seem more prone to this reaction than others. This is called alcoholic steato-necrosis and the inflammation appears to predispose to liver fibrosis. Inflammatory cytokines (TNF-alpha, IL-6 and IL-8) are thought to be essential in the initiation and perpetuation of liver injury and cytotoxic hepatomegaly by inducing apoptosis and severe hepatotoxicity. One possible mechanism for the increased activity of TNF-α is the increased intestinal permeability due to liver disease. This facilitates the absorption of the gut-produced endotoxin into the portal circulation. The Kupffer cells of the liver then phagocytose endotoxin, stimulating the release of TNF-α. TNF-α then triggers apoptotic pathways through the activation of caspases, resulting in cell death.

=== Cirrhosis ===
Cirrhosis is a late stage of serious liver disease marked by inflammation (swelling), fibrosis (cellular hardening) and damaged membranes preventing detoxification of chemicals in the body, ending in scarring and necrosis (cell death). Between 10% and 20% of heavy drinkers will develop cirrhosis of the liver (NIAAA, 1993). Acetaldehyde may be responsible for alcohol-induced fibrosis by stimulating collagen deposition by hepatic stellate cells. The production of oxidants derived from NADPH oxidase and/or cytochrome P-450 2E1 and the formation of acetaldehyde-protein adducts damage the cell membrane. Symptoms include jaundice (yellowing), liver enlargement, and pain and tenderness from the structural changes in damaged liver architecture. Without total abstinence from alcohol use, cirrhosis will eventually lead to liver failure. Late complications of cirrhosis or liver failure include portal hypertension (high blood pressure in the portal vein due to the increased flow resistance through the damaged liver), coagulation disorders (due to impaired production of coagulation factors), ascites (heavy abdominal swelling due to a buildup of fluids in the tissues) and other complications, including hepatic encephalopathy and the hepatorenal syndrome. Cirrhosis can also result from other causes than hazardous alcohol use, such as viral hepatitis and heavy exposure to toxins other than alcohol. The late stages of cirrhosis may look similar medically, regardless of cause. This phenomenon is termed the "final common pathway" for the disease. Fatty change and alcoholic hepatitis with abstinence can be reversible. The later stages of fibrosis and cirrhosis tend to be irreversible, but can usually be contained with abstinence for long periods of time.

== Diagnosis ==
In the early stages, patients with ALD exhibit subtle and often no abnormal physical findings. It is usually not until development of advanced liver disease that stigmata of chronic liver disease become apparent. Early ALD is usually discovered during routine health examinations when liver enzyme levels are found to be elevated. These usually reflect alcoholic hepatic steatosis. Microvesicular and macrovesicular steatosis with inflammation are seen in liver biopsy specimens. These histologic features of ALD are indistinguishable from those of non-alcoholic fatty liver disease (metabolic dysfunction–associated steatotic liver disease (MASLD)). Steatosis usually resolves after discontinuation of alcohol use. Continuation of alcohol use will result in a higher risk of progression of liver disease and cirrhosis. In patients with acute alcoholic hepatitis, clinical manifestations include fever, jaundice, hepatomegaly, and possible hepatic decompensation with hepatic encephalopathy, variceal bleeding, and ascites accumulation. Tender hepatomegaly may be present, but abdominal pain is unusual. Occasionally, the patient may be asymptomatic.

=== Laboratory findings ===
In people with alcoholic hepatitis, the serum aspartate aminotransferase (AST) to alanine aminotransferase (ALT) ratio is greater than 2:1. AST and ALT levels are almost always less than 500. The elevated AST to ALT ratio is due to deficiency of pyridoxal phosphate, which is required in the ALT enzyme synthetic pathway. Furthermore, alcohol metabolite–induced injury of hepatic mitochondria results in AST isoenzyme release. Other laboratory findings include red blood cell macrocytosis (mean corpuscular volume > 100) and elevations of serum gamma-glutamyl transferase (GGT), alkaline phosphatase, and bilirubin levels. Folate level is reduced in alcoholic patients due to decreased intestinal absorption, increased bone marrow requirement for folate in the presence of alcohol, and increased urinary loss. The magnitude of leukocytopenia (white blood cell depletion) reflects severity of liver injury. Histologic features include Mallory bodies, giant mitochondria, hepatocyte necrosis, and neutrophil infiltration in the area around the veins. Mallory bodies, which are also present in other liver diseases, are condensations of cytokeratin components in the hepatocyte cytoplasm and do not contribute to liver injury. Up to 70% of patients with moderate to severe alcoholic hepatitis already have cirrhosis identifiable on biopsy examination at the time of diagnosis.

== Treatment ==
Not drinking further alcohol is the most important part of treatment. People with chronic HCV infection should abstain from any alcohol intake, due to the risk for rapid acceleration of liver disease.

=== Medications ===
A 2006 Cochrane review did not find evidence sufficient for the use of androgenic anabolic steroids. Corticosteroids are sometimes used; however, this is recommended only when severe liver inflammation is present.

Silymarin has been investigated as a possible treatment, with ambiguous results. One review claimed benefit for S-adenosyl methionine in disease models.

The effects of anti-tumor necrosis factor medications such as infliximab and etanercept are unclear and possibly harmful. Evidence is unclear for pentoxifylline. Propylthiouracil may result in harm.

Evidence does not support supplemental nutrition in liver disease.

=== Transplantation ===
Although in rare cases liver cirrhosis is reversible, the disease process remains mostly irreversible. Liver transplantation remains the only definitive therapy. Today, survival after liver transplantation is similar for people with ALD and non-ALD. The requirements for transplant listing vary among transplant centers. A period of alcohol abstinence for at least 6 months is often used prior to liver transplant. Sustained sobriety may improve liver function enough to avoid transplantation and allows clinicians to assess patient adherence to treatment, however there is neither a consensus nor absolute requirement on timing. Additionally the duration of abstinence prior to transplantation has not been proven to be related to the risk of recidivism. This suggests the risk of relapse may be more related to psychosocial factors which can be carefully evaluated before transplantation by a team of mental health providers and social workers. Relapse to alcohol use after transplant listing results in delisting. Re-listing is possible in many institutions, but only after 3–6 months of sobriety. There are limited data on transplant survival in patients transplanted for acute alcoholic hepatitis, but it is believed to be similar to that in nonacute ALD, non-ALD, and alcoholic hepatitis with MDF less than 32.

== Prognosis ==
The prognosis for people with ALD depends on the liver histology as well as cofactors, such as concomitant chronic viral hepatitis. Among patients with alcoholic hepatitis, progression to liver cirrhosis occurs at 10–20% per year, and 70% will eventually develop cirrhosis. Despite cessation of alcohol use, only 10% will have normalization of histology and serum liver enzyme levels. As previously noted, the MDF has been used to predict short-term mortality (i.e., MDF ≥ 32 associated with spontaneous survival of 50–65% without corticosteroid therapy, and MDF < 32 associated with spontaneous survival of 90%). The Model for End-Stage Liver Disease (MELD) score has also been found to have similar predictive accuracy in 30-day (MELD > 11) and 90-day (MELD > 21) mortality. Liver cirrhosis develops in 6–14% of those who consume more than 60–80 g of alcohol daily for men and more than 20 g daily for women. Even in those who drink more than 120 g daily, only 13.5% will experience a serious alcohol-related liver injury. Nevertheless, alcohol-related mortality was the third leading cause of death in 2003 in the United States. Worldwide mortality is estimated to be 150,000 per year. Alcoholic liver disease can lead to the development of exocrine pancreatic insufficiency.
