= Fatty liver disease =

Medical condition where fat accumulates in the liver

Fatty liver
- Other names: Hepatic steatosis
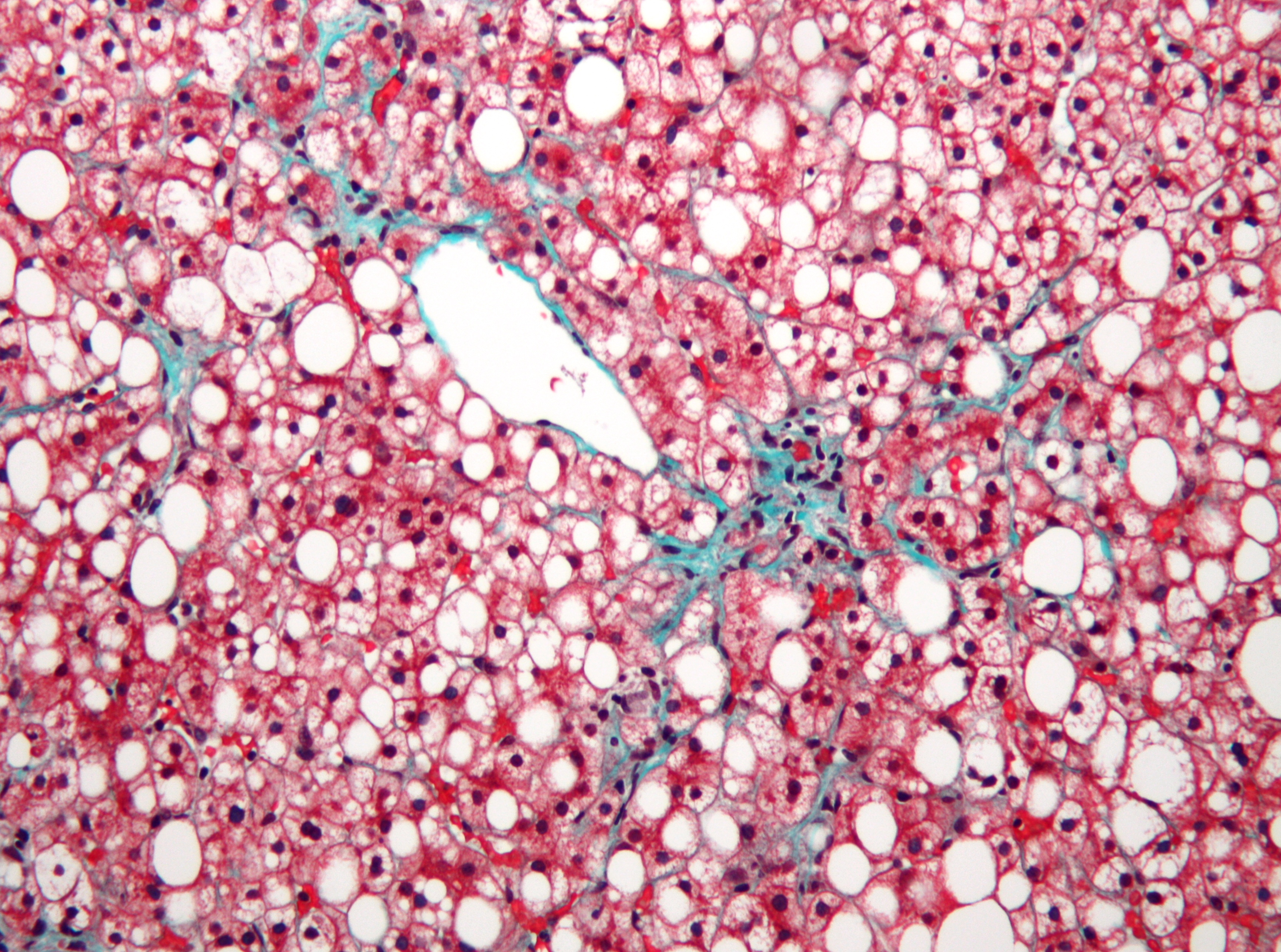
- Micrograph showing a fatty liver (macrovesicular steatosis), as seen in metabolic dysfunction–associated steatotic liver disease. (Trichrome stain)
- Specialty: Gastroenterology
- Symptoms: None, tiredness, pain in the upper right side of the abdomen
- Complications: Cirrhosis, liver cancer, esophageal varices
- Types: Metabolic dysfunction–associated steatotic liver disease (MASLD); Alcoholic liver disease (ALD)
- Causes: Alcohol, diabetes, obesity
- Diagnostic method: Based on the medical history supported by a blood test.; Medical imaging; Liver biopsy
- Differential diagnosis: Viral hepatitis; Wilson's disease; Primary sclerosing cholangitis
- Treatment: Avoiding alcohol; Weight loss
- Prognosis: Good if treated early
- Frequency: NAFLD: 30% (Western countries); ALD: >90% of heavy drinkers

Fatty liver disease (FLD), also known as hepatic steatosis and steatotic liver disease (SLD), is a condition where excess fat builds up in the liver. Often there are no or few symptoms. Occasionally there may be tiredness or pain in the upper right side of the abdomen. Complications may include cirrhosis, liver cancer, and esophageal varices.

The main subtypes of fatty liver disease are metabolic dysfunction–associated steatotic liver disease (MASLD) and alcoholic liver disease (ALD), with the category "metabolic and alcohol associated liver disease" (metALD) describing an overlap of the two.

Until June 2023, MASLD and its more advanced form, metabolic dysfunction associated steatohepatitis (MASH), were referred to as non-alcoholic fatty liver disease (NAFLD) and non-alcoholic steatohepatitis (NASH), respectively. The change in terminology was decided in a modified Delphi process led by three large pan-national liver associations (the American Association for the Study of Liver Diseases, the European Association for the Study of the Liver and the Latin American Association for the Study of the Liver).

The primary risks include alcohol, type 2 diabetes, and obesity. Other risk factors include certain medications such as glucocorticoids, and hepatitis C. It is unclear why some people with MASLD develop simple fatty liver and others develop metabolic dysfunction associated steatohepatitis (MASH), which is associated with poorer outcomes. Diagnosis is based on the medical history supported by blood tests, medical imaging, and occasionally liver biopsy.

Treatment of MASLD is generally by dietary changes and exercise to bring about weight loss. In those who are severely affected, liver transplantation may be an option. More than 90% of heavy drinkers develop fatty liver while about 25% develop the more severe alcoholic hepatitis. MASLD affects about 30% of people in Western countries and 10% of people in Asia. MASLD affects about 10% of children in the United States. It occurs more often in older people and males.

== Classification ==
Until 2023, fatty liver disease was classified into:

- Non-alcoholic fatty liver disease (NAFLD) made up of:
  - Non-alcoholic fatty liver (NAFL) or simple fatty liver
  - Non-alcoholic steatohepatitis (NASH)
- Alcoholic liver disease (ALD).

In 2023, a new nomenclature was chosen, with the classifications including:

- Metabolic dysfunction–associated steatotic liver disease (MASLD), including:
  - Metabolic dysfunction-associated steatohepatitis (MASH)
- Metabolic and alcohol associated liver disease (metALD). Describes those with MASLD who consume greater amounts of alcohol per week but not enough to be categorized as ALD)
- Alcohol-associated liver disease (ALD)
- Specific aetiology SLD (including drug-induced, monogenic diseases and others)

== Signs and symptoms ==
Often there are no or few symptoms. Occasionally there may be tiredness or pain in the upper right side of the abdomen.

=== Complications ===
Fatty liver can develop into hepatic fibrosis, cirrhosis or liver cancer. For people affected by MASLD, the 10-year survival rate was about 80%. The rate of progression of fibrosis is estimated to be one per 7 years in MASH and one per 14 years in MASLD, with an increasing speed. There is a strong relationship between these pathologies and metabolic illnesses (diabetes type II, metabolic syndrome). These pathologies can also affect non-obese people, who are then at a higher risk.

Less than 10% of people with cirrhotic alcoholic FLD will develop hepatocellular carcinoma, the most common type of primary liver cancer in adults, but up to 45% people with MASH without cirrhosis can develop hepatocellular carcinoma.

The condition is also associated with other diseases that influence fat metabolism.

== Causes ==
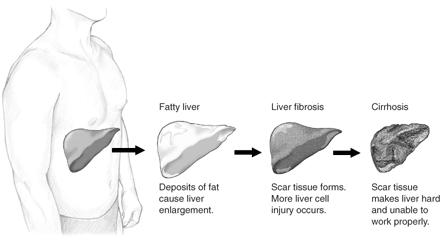
Different stages of liver damage

Fatty liver (FL) is commonly associated with metabolic syndrome (diabetes, hypertension, obesity, and dyslipidemia), but can also be due to any one of many causes:

Alcohol
Alcohol use disorder is one of the causes of fatty liver due to production of toxic metabolites like aldehydes during metabolism of alcohol in the liver. This phenomenon most commonly occurs with chronic alcohol use disorder.
Metabolic
abetalipoproteinemia, glycogen storage diseases, Weber–Christian disease, acute fatty liver of pregnancy, lipodystrophy
Nutritional
obesity, malnutrition, total parenteral nutrition, severe weight loss, refeeding syndrome, jejunoileal bypass, gastric bypass, jejunal diverticulosis with bacterial overgrowth
Drugs and toxins
amiodarone, methotrexate, diltiazem, intravenous tetracycline, highly active antiretroviral therapy, glucocorticoids, tamoxifen, environmental hepatotoxins (e.g., phosphorus, mushroom poisoning)
Other
celiac disease, inflammatory bowel disease, HIV, hepatitis C (especially genotype 3), and alpha 1-antitrypsin deficiency

== Pathology ==
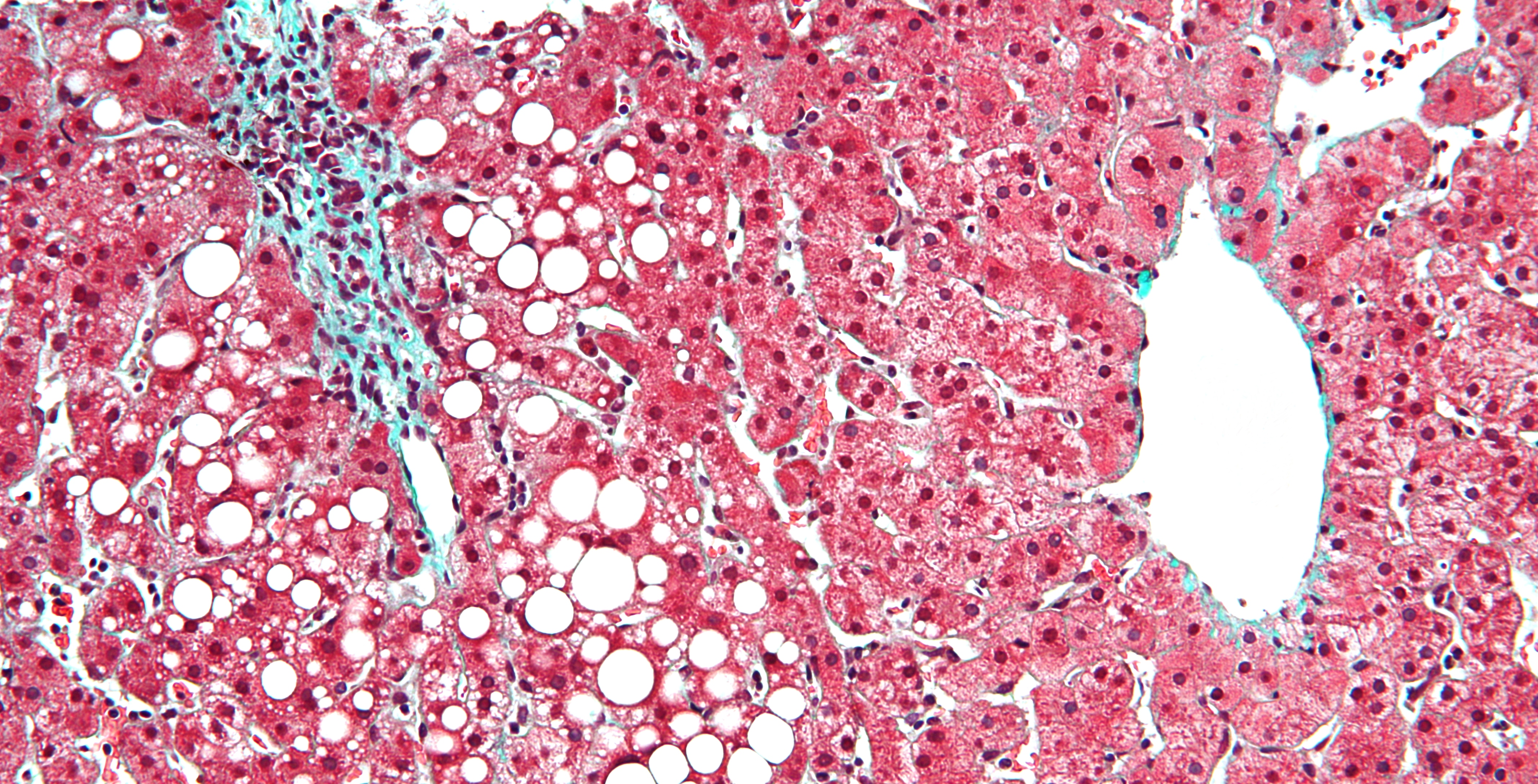
Micrograph of periportal hepatic steatosis, as may be seen due to steroid use, trichrome stain

The fatty change represents the intracytoplasmatic accumulation of triglycerides (neutral fats). At the beginning, the hepatocytes present small fat vacuoles (liposomes) around the nucleus (microvesicular fatty change). At this stage, liver cells are filled with multiple fat droplets that do not displace the centrally located nucleus. In the last stages, the size of the vacuoles increases, pushing the nucleus to the periphery of the cell, giving a characteristic signet ring appearance (macrovesicular fatty change). These vesicles are well-delineated and optically "empty" because fats dissolve during tissue processing. Large vacuoles may coalesce and produce fatty cysts, which are irreversible lesions. Macrovesicular steatosis is the most common form and is typically associated with alcohol, diabetes, obesity, and corticosteroids. Acute fatty liver of pregnancy and Reye's syndrome are examples of severe liver disease caused by microvesicular fatty change. The diagnosis of steatosis is made when fat in the liver exceeds 5–10% by weight.

Mechanism leading to hepatic steatosis

Defects in fatty acid metabolism are responsible for pathogenesis of FLD, which may be due to imbalance in energy consumption and its combustion, resulting in lipid storage, or can be a consequence of peripheral resistance to insulin, whereby the transport of fatty acids from adipose tissue to the liver is increased. Impairment or inhibition of receptor molecules (PPAR-α, PPAR-γ and SREBP1) that control the enzymes responsible for the oxidation and synthesis of fatty acids appears to contribute to fat deposit. In addition, alcohol use disorder is known to damage mitochondria and other cellular structures, further impairing cellular energy mechanism. On the other hand, non-alcoholic FLD may begin as excess of unmetabolized energy in liver cells. Hepatic steatosis is considered reversible and to some extent nonprogressive if the underlying cause is reduced or removed.

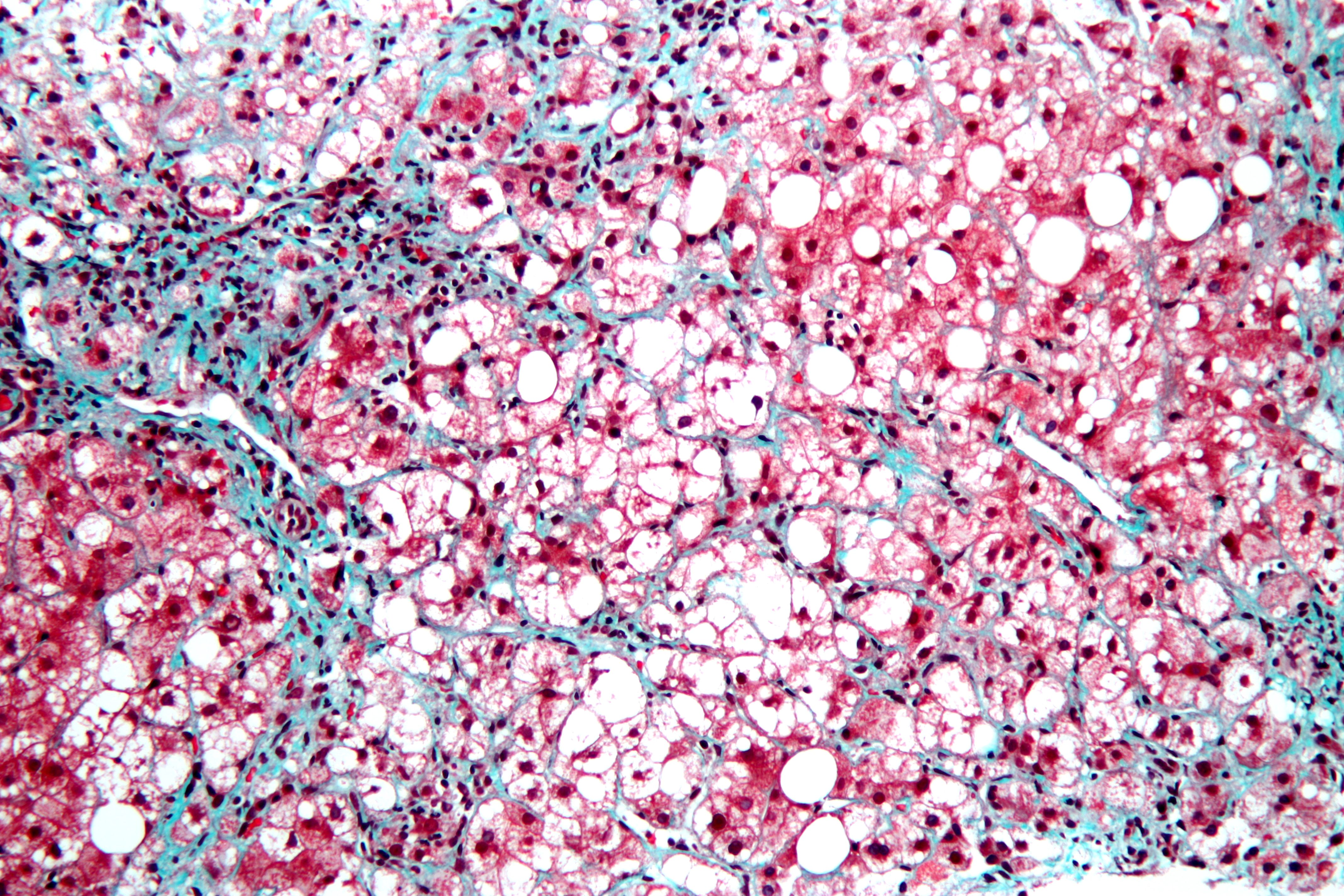
Micrograph of inflamed fatty liver (steatohepatitis)

Severe fatty liver is sometimes go along with inflammation, a situation referred to as steatohepatitis. Progression to alcoholic steatohepatitis (ASH) or metabolic dysfunction associated steatohepatitis (MASH) depends on the persistence or severity of the inciting cause. Pathological lesions in both conditions are similar. However, the extent of inflammatory response varies widely and does not always correlate with degree of fat accumulation. Steatosis (retention of lipid) and onset of steatohepatitis may represent successive stages in FLD progression.

Liver disease with extensive inflammation and a high degree of steatosis often progresses to more severe forms of the disease. Hepatocyte ballooning and necrosis of varying degrees are often present at this stage. Liver cell death and inflammatory responses lead to the activation of hepatic stellate cells, which play a pivotal role in hepatic fibrosis. The extent of fibrosis varies widely. Perisinusoidal fibrosis is most common, especially in adults, and predominates in zone 3 around the terminal hepatic veins.

The progression to cirrhosis may be influenced by the amount of fat and degree of steatohepatitis and by a variety of other sensitizing factors. In alcoholic FLD, the transition to cirrhosis related to continued alcohol consumption is well-documented, but the process involved in non-alcoholic FLD is less clear.

== Diagnosis ==
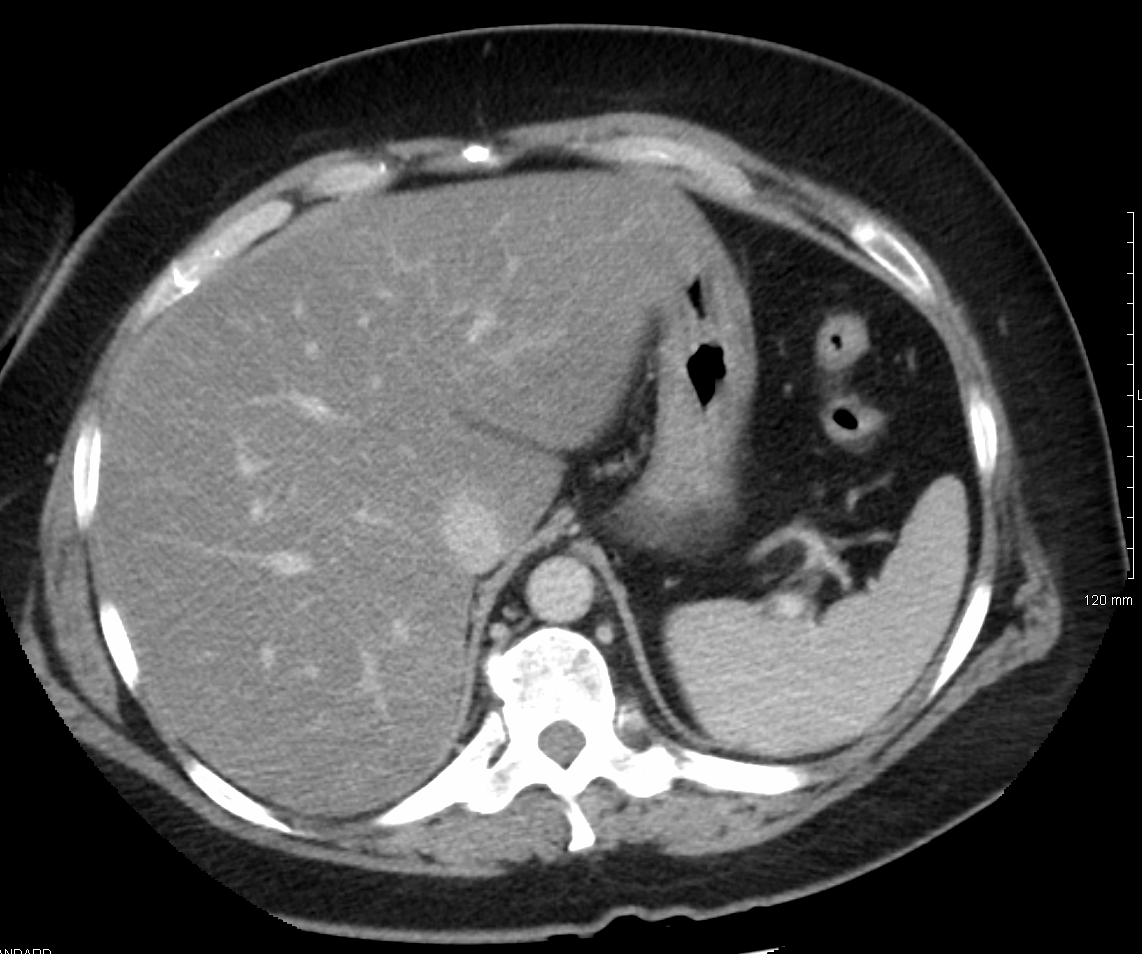
Liver steatosis (fatty liver disease) as seen on CT

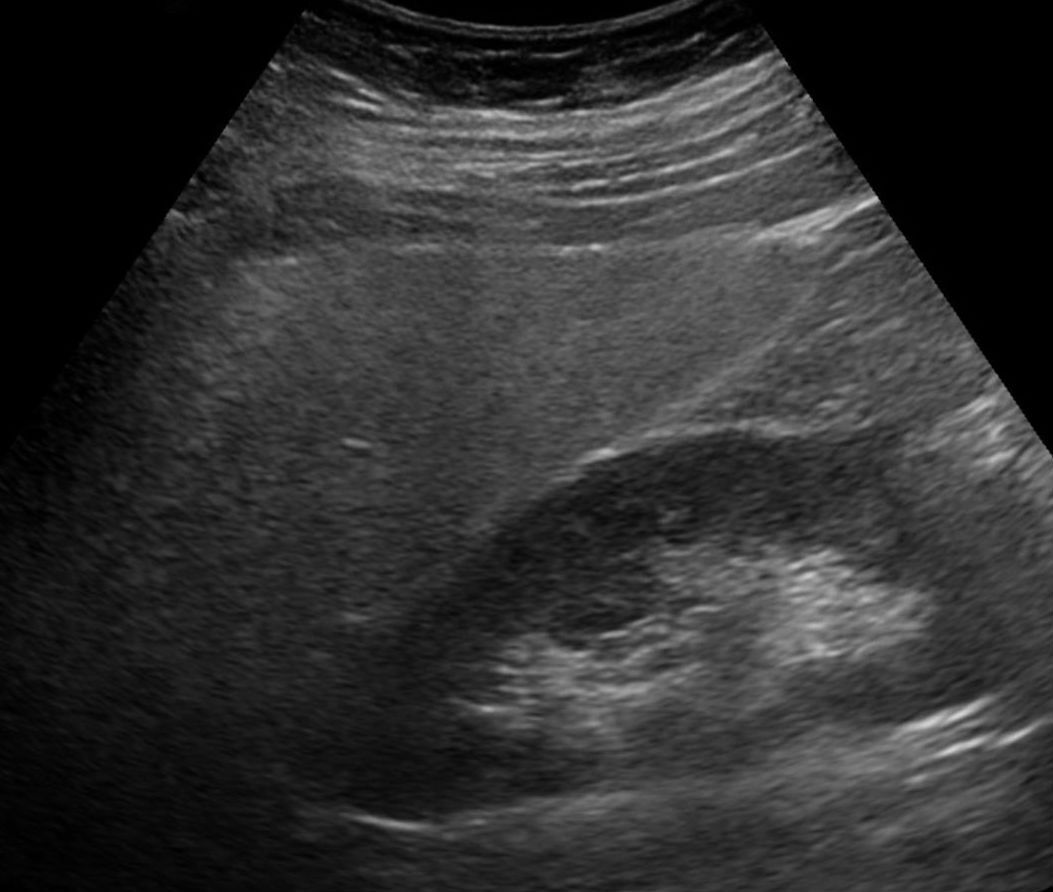
Ultrasound showing diffuse increased echogenicity of the liver

Flow chart for diagnosis

Elevated liver enzyme
Serology to exclude viral hepatitis
Imaging study showing fatty infiltrate
Alcohol intake
Less than two drinks per day‡ | More than two drinks per day‡
Nonalcoholic fatty liver disease likely | Alcoholic liver disease likely

‡ Criteria for nonalcoholic fatty liver disease:
consumption of ethanol less than 20 g/day for women and 30 g/day for men

Most individuals are asymptomatic and are usually discovered incidentally because of abnormal liver function tests or hepatomegaly noted in unrelated medical conditions. Elevated liver enzymes are found in as many as 50% of patients with simple steatosis. The serum alanine transaminase (ALT) level usually is greater than the aspartate transaminase (AST) level in the nonalcoholic variant and the opposite in alcoholic FLD (AST:ALT more than 2:1). Simple blood tests may help to determine the magnitude of the disease by assessing the degree of liver fibrosis. For example, AST-to-platelets ratio index (APRI score) and several other scores, calculated from the results of blood tests, can detect the degree of liver fibrosis and predict the future formation of liver cancer.

Imaging studies are often obtained during the evaluation process. Ultrasonography reveals a "bright" liver with increased echogenicity. Pocket-sized ultrasound devices might be used as point-of-care screening tools to diagnose liver steatosis. Medical imaging can aid in diagnosis of fatty liver; fatty livers have lower density than spleens on computed tomography (CT), and fat appears bright in T1-weighted magnetic resonance images (MRIs).

Histological diagnosis by liver biopsy is the most accurate measure of fibrosis and liver fat progression as of 2018. Conventional imaging methods, such as ultrasound, CT and MRI, are not specific enough to detect fatty liver disease unless fat occupies at least 30% of the liver volume.

More advanced imaging techniques are under investigation for both the diagnosis and monitoring of fatty liver disease patients, including elastography techniques (both ultrasound-based techniques and using magnetic resonance elastography) to measure the stiffness of the liver, which increases due to the accumulation of liver fibrosis. Several studies have also explored the use of quantitative MRI techniques such as proton density fat-fraction mapping and iron-corrected T1 (cT1) mapping techniques.

== Treatment ==
Decreasing caloric intake by at least 30% or by approximately 750–1,000 kcal/day results in improvement in hepatic steatosis. For people with MASLD or MASH, weight loss via a combination of diet and exercise was shown to improve or resolve the disease. In more serious cases, medications that decrease insulin resistance, hyperlipidemia, and those that induce weight loss such as bariatric surgery as well as vitamin E have been shown to improve or resolve liver function.

Bariatric surgery, while not recommended in 2017 as a treatment for FLD alone, has been shown to revert FLD, MASLD, MASH and advanced steatohepatitis in over 90% of people who have undergone this surgery for the treatment of obesity.

In the case of long-term total-parenteral-nutrition-induced fatty liver disease, choline has been shown to alleviate symptoms. This may be due to a deficiency in the methionine cycle.

== Epidemiology ==
NAFLD affects about 30% of people in Western countries and 10% of people in Asia. In the United States, rates are around 35% with about 7% having the severe form NASH. NAFLD affects about 10% of children in the United States. Recently the term Metabolic dysfunction-associated fatty liver disease (MAFLD) has been proposed to replace NAFLD. MAFLD is a more inclusionary diagnostic name as it is based on the detection of fatty liver by histology (biopsy), medical imaging or blood biomarkers but should be accompanied by either overweight/obesity, type 2 diabetes mellitus, or metabolic dysregulation. The new definition no longer excludes alcohol consumption or coexistence of other liver diseases such as viral hepatitis. Using this more inclusive definition, the global prevalence of MAFLD is an astonishingly high 50.7%. Indeed, also using the old NAFLD definition, the disease is observed in up to 80% of obese people, 35% of whom progress to NASH, and in up to 20% of normal weight people, despite no evidence of excessive alcohol consumption. FLD is the most common cause of abnormal liver function tests in the United States. Fatty liver is more prevalent in Hispanic people than white, with black people having the lowest prevalence.

In the study Children of the 90s, 2.5% born in 1991 and 1992 were found by ultrasound at the age of 18 to have non-alcoholic fatty liver disease; five years later transient elastography found over 20% to have the fatty deposits on the liver, indicating non-alcoholic fatty liver disease; half of those were classified as severe. The scans also found that 2.4% had a degree of liver fibrosis, which can lead to cirrhosis.

After the lockdown of the COVID-19 pandemic, a study demonstrated that 48% of patients with liver steatosis gained weight, while 16% had a worsened steatosis grade. Weight gain was associated with poor adherence to the suggested diet, reduced levels of physical activity, and increased prevalence of homozygosity for the PNPLA3 rs738409 single nucleotide polymorphism. PNPLA3 rs738409 is already a known risk factor for NAFLD.

== Research ==
A systematic review and meta-analysis, published in 2024, found that growth hormone therapy may help in the management of fatty liver disease.

== In animals ==
Fatty liver disease can occur in pets such as reptiles (particularly turtles) and birds as well as mammals like cats and dogs. The most common cause is overnutrition. A distinct sign in birds is a misshapen beak. Fatty livers can be induced via gavage in geese or ducks to produce foie gras. Fatty liver can also be induced in ruminants such as sheep by a high-caloric diet.
