= Aramchol =

Chemical compound

Clinical data
- Other names: Arachidyl amido cholanoic acid; C20-FABAC

Legal status
- Legal status: Investigational

Identifiers
- IUPAC name: (4R)-4-[(3S,5S,7R,8R,9S,10S,12S,13R,14S,17R)-7,12-dihydroxy-3-(icosanoylamino)-10,13-dimethyl-2,3,4,5,6,7,8,9,11,12,14,15,16,17-tetradecahydro-1H-cyclopenta[a]phenanthren-17-yl]pentanoic acid
- CAS Number: 246529-22-6
- PubChem CID: 18738120
- DrugBank: DB11860
- ChemSpider: 18995061
- UNII: QE1Q24M65Y
- ChEMBL: ChEMBL4297262
- CompTox Dashboard (EPA): DTXSID90179395

Chemical and physical data
- Formula: C_{44}H_{79}NO_{5}
- Molar mass: 702.118 g·mol^{−1}
- 3D model (JSmol): Interactive image
- SMILES: [H][C@@]1(CC[C@H]2[C@]3([H])[C@H](O)C[C@@H]4C[C@H](CC[C@]4(C)[C@H]3C[C@H](O)[C@]12C)NC(=O)CCCCCCCCCCCCCCCCCCC)[C@H](C)CCC(O)=O
- InChI: InChI=1S/C44H79NO5/c1-5-6-7-8-9-10-11-12-13-14-15-16-17-18-19-20-21-22-40(48)45-34-27-28-43(3)33(29-34)30-38(46)42-36-25-24-35(32(2)23-26-41(49)50)44(36,4)39(47)31-37(42)43/h32-39,42,46-47H,5-31H2,1-4H3,(H,45,48)(H,49,50)/t32-,33+,34+,35-,36+,37+,38-,39+,42+,43+,44-/m1/s1; Key:SHKXZIQNFMOPBS-OOMQYRRCSA-N

Aramchol is an investigational drug being developed by Galmed Pharmaceuticals as a first-in-class, potentially treatment for nonalcoholic steatohepatitis,(NASH), a progressive form of metabolic dysfunction–associated steatotic liver disease.

It is a conjugate of cholic acid and arachidic acid, and belongs to a class of synthetic fatty-acid/bile-acid conjugates(FABACs), which are composed of endogenous compounds administrated orally, with the aim of good safety and tolerability parameters.

Aramchol affects liver fat metabolism and has been shown in a Phase IIa clinical study to significantly reduce liver fat content as well as improve metabolic parameters associated with fatty liver disease. Furthermore, it has been shown to be safe for use, and with no severe adverse effects.

Aramchol was initially intended to combine a cholesterol solubilizing moiety (a saturated fatty acid) with a bile acid (cholic acid) acting as a vehicle to enable secretion into bile and entry into the enterohepatic circulation to solubilise bile stones. However, early in the development, it was observed that Aramchol reduced liver fat infiltration in animals fed a high fat, lithogenic diet.

== The SCD1 pathway ==
Aramchol inhibits the activity of stearoyl coenzyme A desaturase 1 (SCD1) in the liver. This is likely a direct effect since the mRNA of this and other lipogenic genes or the activities of nuclear receptors are not affected. The physiologic effects of SCD1 inhibition are: decreased synthesis of fatty acids, resulting in a decrease in storage triglycerides and other esters of fatty acids. This reduces liver fat (including triglycerides and free fatty acids), and results in an improvement in insulin resistance. Aramchol’s mechanism of action, inhibition of the SCD1 enzyme, has been confirmed in human liver microsomes2 and in animal studies by showing a reduction of the SCD1 activity marker, the fatty acid ratio 16:1/16:0, following Aramchol treatment. These studies showed that the SCD1 inhibition effect of Aramchol is partial (can reach to 70 to 83%). Unlike other SCD1 inhibitors, it was shown that Aramchol’s effects are non-atherogenic.

== Reverse cholesterol transport ==
Aramchol activates cholesterol efflux by stimulating (2 to 4-fold) the ABCA1 transporter, a universal cholesterol export pump present in all cells. In animal models, this led to a significant reduction of blood and body cholesterol and an increase in fecal sterol output, mostly neutral sterols.

Aramchol is the first small molecule that was shown to induce ABCA1-dependent cholesterol efflux without affecting transcriptional control.
