= Steatohepatitis =

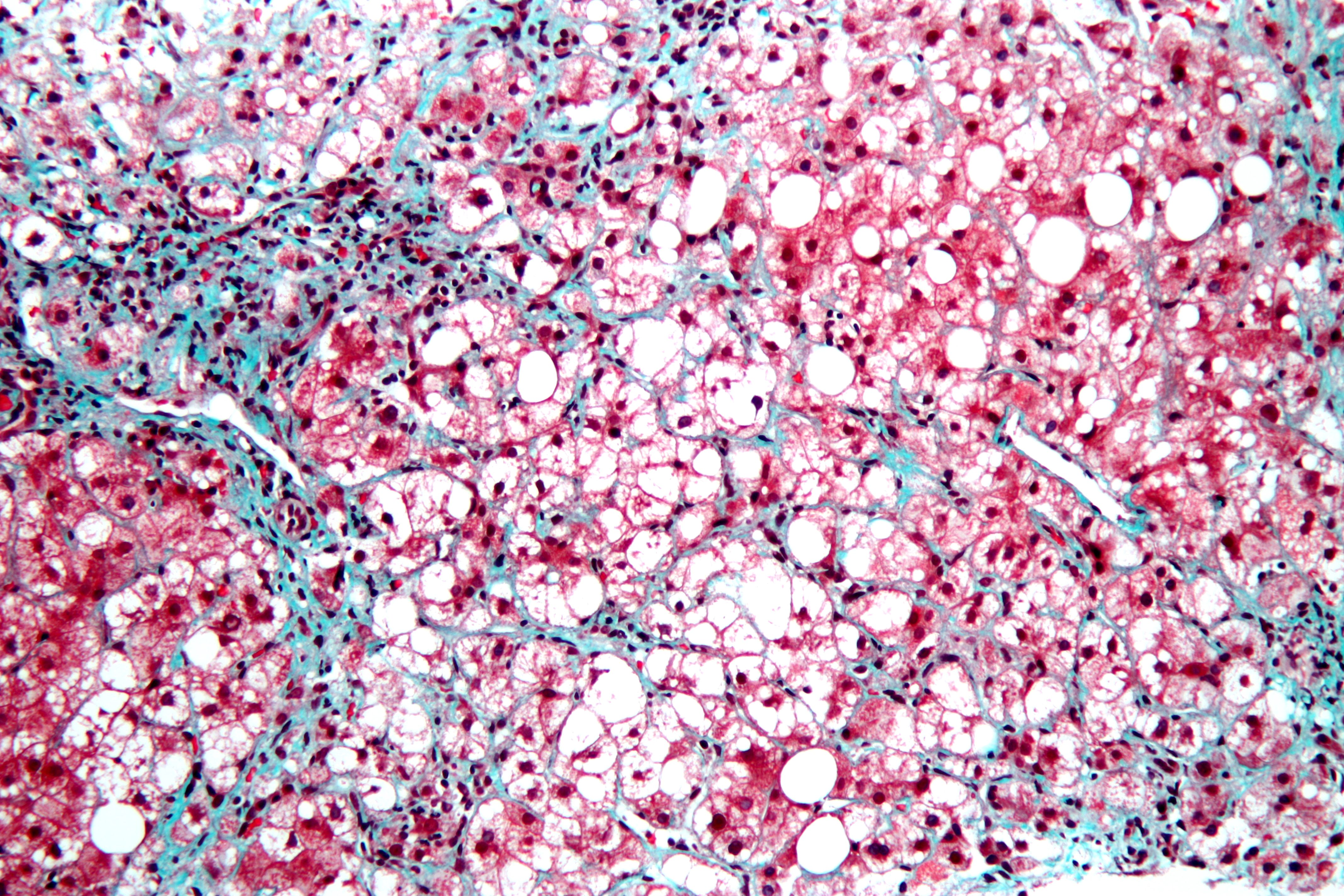
- Micrograph of steatohepatitis. Liver biopsy using trichrome stain
- Specialty: Gastroenterology

Steatohepatitis is a type of fatty liver disease, characterized by inflammation of the liver with concurrent fat accumulation in liver. Mere deposition of fat in the liver is termed steatosis, and together these constitute fatty liver changes.

The two main types of fatty liver disease (FLD) are:

- Metabolic dysfunction-associated steatotic liver disease (MASLD) (previously nonalcoholic fatty liver disease or NAFLD)
- Alcohol-associated (alcohol-related) liver disease (ALD)

Risk factors for MASLD include diabetes, obesity, and metabolic syndrome. When inflammation is present, it is referred to as alcoholic steatohepatitis and nonalcoholic (metabolic dysfunction associated) steatohepatitis (MASH, previously NASH). Steatohepatitis of either cause may progress to cirrhosis, and MASH is now believed to be a frequent cause of unexplained cirrhosis (at least in Western societies). MASH is also associated with lysosomal acid lipase deficiency.

The word is from "steato-", meaning fat, "hepat-", meaning liver, and "itis", meaning inflammation, hence "inflammation of the liver".

== Alcoholic steatohepatitis ==
Chronic alcohol intake commonly causes steatohepatitis.

== Metabolic dysfunction-associated steatohepatitis ==
Previously known as non-alcoholic steatohepatitis (NASH), metabolic dysfunction-associated steatohepatitis (MASH) is characterized by liver cell damage or inflammation histologically (on biopsy), but fatty infiltration is usually also present as opposed to MASLD, which is characterized only by fatty infiltration of the liver. Both MASH and MASLD are caused by metabolic disorders such as diabetes, obesity, hypertriglyceridemia, dyslipidemia, or metabolic syndrome, with alcohol not being involved (although alcohol may exacerbate both diseases). Both may progress to cirrhosis of the liver, but the risk is much greater with MASH as opposed to MASLD. At 15 years, 11% of people with MASH develop cirrhosis as opposed to less than 1% with MASLD. All-cause mortality in MASH is 25.5 per 1000 person years with a liver-specific mortality of 11.7 per 1000 person years. The most common cause of death in those with MASH is cardiovascular disease. MASH is associated with a 1.7 times overall mortality, 15 times liver-specific mortality, and 12 times risk of liver cancer as compared to MASLD. Those with MASH and MASLD usually do not have symptoms, but people with MASH may sometimes have nonspecific abdominal discomfort or fatigue.

Treatment for MASH and MASLD is primarily with healthy diet, exercise, and weight loss, which have been shown to cause regression of liver cell damage in MASH. General recommendations include improving metabolic risk factors and reducing alcohol intake. A weight loss of 5-10% has been found to lead to regression of liver cell damage on biopsy in MASH, with a weight loss greater than 10% being associated with 90% of people having resolution of disease. Bariatric surgery is sometimes used. As of March 2024, there is one medication, resmetirom (Rezdiffra™) commercially available in the US for management of NASH. NASH was first described in 1980 in a series of patients of the Mayo Clinic. Its relevance and high prevalence were recognized mainly in the 1990s. Some think NASH is a diagnosis of exclusion, and many cases may, in fact, be due to other causes.

MASH is expected to be the leading indication for liver transplantation in the United States, surpassing ALD.

== See also ==
- Chronic liver disease
- Aramchol
- Elafibranor
