= PNPLA3 =

Human gene on the 22nd chromosome

Identifiers
- Aliases: PNPLA3, ADPN, C22orf20, iPLA(2)epsilon, patatin like phospholipase domain containing 3
- External IDs: OMIM: 609567; MGI: 2151796; GeneCards: PNPLA3
Enzyme activity
EC #	BRENDA	ExPASy	KEGG	MetaCyc
2.3.1.51	↗	↗	↗	↗
3.1.1.3	↗	↗	↗	↗
3.1.1.4	↗	↗	↗	↗

Gene location (Human)
Chr.	Chromosome 22 (human)
Band	22q13.31	Start	43,923,792 bp
Band	22q13.31	End	43,964,488 bp

Gene location (Mouse)
Chr.	Chromosome 15 (mouse)
Band	15|15 E2	Start	84,052,038 bp
Band	15|15 E2	End	84,071,437 bp
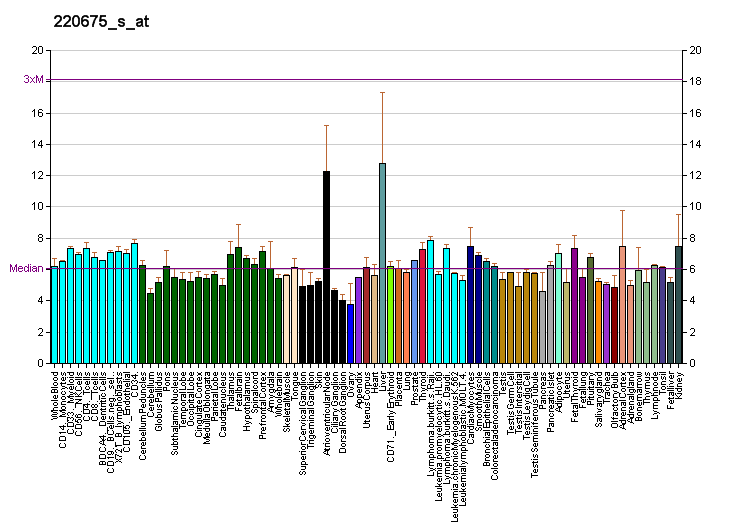
RNA expression pattern
Bgee	Human / Mouse (ortholog); Top expressed in: retinal pigment epithelium; buccal mucosa cell; right lobe of liver; secondary oocyte; tibia; skin of leg; vulva; testicle; skin of abdomen; middle temporal gyrus / Top expressed in: white adipose tissue; neural layer of retina; zone of skin; esophagus; lens; lip; skeletal muscle tissue; left lung; quadriceps femoris muscle; morula; More reference expression data
BioGPS	More reference expression data
Gene ontology
Molecular function	mono-olein transacylation activity; transferase activity; phospholipase A2 activity; acyltransferase activity; hydrolase activity; diolein transacylation activity; acylglycerol O-acyltransferase activity; lipoprotein lipase activity; triglyceride lipase activity; lysophosphatidic acid binding; long-chain fatty acyl-CoA binding; lysophosphatidic acid acyltransferase activity; 1-acylglycerol-3-phosphate O-acyltransferase activity
Cellular component	integral component of membrane; endoplasmic reticulum membrane; cytoplasm; lipid droplet; membrane
Biological process	lipid catabolic process; triglyceride biosynthetic process; metabolism; acylglycerol acyl-chain remodeling; lipid metabolism; triglyceride catabolic process; triglyceride acyl-chain remodeling; lipid homeostasis; long-chain fatty acid metabolic process; glycerophospholipid metabolic process; phosphatidic acid biosynthetic process; lipid droplet organization; phospholipid biosynthetic process
Sources:Amigo / QuickGO
Orthologs
Databases	NCBI: entry; OMA: entry
Species	Human	Mouse
Entrez	80339	116939
Ensembl	ENSG00000100344	ENSMUSG00000041653
UniProt	Q9NST1	Q91WW7
RefSeq (mRNA)	NM_025225	NM_054088
RefSeq (protein)	NP_079501	NP_473429; NP_001395268; NP_001395269; NP_001395270; NP_001395271
Location (UCSC)	Chr 22: 43.92 – 43.96 Mb	Chr 15: 84.05 – 84.07 Mb
PubMed search
- Wikidata
View/Edit Human	View/Edit Mouse

Patatin-like phospholipase domain-containing protein 3 (PNPLA3), also known as adiponutrin (ADPN), acylglycerol O-acyltransferase or calcium-independent phospholipase A2-epsilon (iPLA2-epsilon) is an enzyme that in humans is encoded by the PNPLA3 gene.

== Function ==
Adiponutrin is a triacylglycerol lipase that mediates triacylglycerol hydrolysis in adipocytes. The encoded protein, which appears to be membrane bound, may be involved in the balance of energy usage/storage in adipocytes.

== Genomics ==
The gene is located on the long arm of chromosome 22 at band 13.31 (22q13.31). It lies on the Watson (plus) strand and is 40,750 bases in length.

Upstream of the gene, putative binding sites for several transcription factors have been identified. These include PPAR-gamma, POU2F1, and POU2F2. It is not known at present whether any of these transcriptions factors are actually involved in the regulation of this gene.

== Biochemistry ==
The recommended name for the gene product is patatin-like phospholipase domain-containing protein 3. It is a single-pass type II membrane protein and is a multifunctional enzyme with both triacylglycerol lipase and acylglycerol O-acyltransferase activities. It is involved in the triacylglycerol hydrolysis in adipocytes and may play a role in energy metabolism.

The mature protein is 481 amino acids in length and the predicted molecular weight is 52.865 kilodaltons (kDa). Two of the isoforms have been described, but the functional significance (if any) of these forms is not known.

== Clinical relevance ==
An association between alcoholic liver disease in caucasians and variations in this gene has been confirmed. A mutation of isoleucine to methionine (I[ATC]>M[ATG]) SNP rs738409 has been confirmed to increase susceptibility to non-alcoholic liver disease and also to have effects in diabetes.
