= List of Russian princely families =

This is a list of princely families of the Russian Empire

The list includes:

- families of «natural» Russian princely stock - descended from old Russian dynasties (Rurik Dynasty) and Lithuania (Gediminovich and others);
- families, whose princely titles were granted by Russian Emperors;
- foreign princely families naturalised in Russia;
- Russian princely families, which were granted their titles by foreign sovereigns;

== Princely families ==
=== A ===
1. Princes Abamelek (Georgian, titular princes)
2. Princes Abamelik-Lazarev
3. Princes Abashidze (Georgian nobility, raised to titular princes in the Russian Empire)
4. Princes Abashidze-Gorlenko
5. Princes Abhazovy (Abkhazi)
6. Princes Abhazovy (Anchipadze-Abhazovy, Abkhazi)
7. Princes Abymelikovy (Russified family name of Princes Abamelik)
8. Princes Avalov (Avalishvili) (Georgian appanage princes)
9. Princes Agiashvili (Agiyashvili) (Georgian nobility)
10. Princes Akchurin (Tatar; non-titled, descendants of Mirza Akchura Adashev)
11. Princes Amatuni
12. Princes Amilakhori (Amilahvarovy) (Georgian nobility, raised to titular princes in the Russian Empire)
13. Princes Amilahori (Amilakhori)
14. Princes Amirejibi (Amirejibi, Amiredzhibovy) (Georgian appanage princes)
15. Princes Andronicus (Andronikashvili) (Georgian nobility of royal descent)
16. Princes Anchabadze (Achba, Achbovy) (Abkzazian royalties)
17. Princes Apakidze (Georgian nobility of Tatar descent)
18. Princes Argutinsky-Dolgorukov (Armenian-Georgian nobility, not related to the Dolgorukov family)
19. Princes Argutinsky-Dolgorukov (Mhargdzeli-Argutashvili)
20. Princes Asatiani
21. Princes Akhvlediani

=== B ===
1. Princes Babadyshevy (Babadishvili) (Georgian nobility)
2. Princes Babichevy (a branch of the Princes of Drutsk, descendants of Prince Ivan Semyonovich Baba-Drutsky)
3. Princes Bagration (Georgian royal family; descendants of the king of Kartli Jesse I)
4. Princess Bagration (descendants of King Alexander of Imereti V)
5. Princes Bagration-Davydov (Bagration-Davitashvili)
6. Princes Bagration Imeretian (Bagration-Imeretinsky or Bagration-Imeretian, styled His/Her Serene Highness)
7. Princes Bagration of Mukhrani
8. Princes Bahmanov also Persidskii (Persian; descendants of the Persian Prince Bahman Mirza; a branch of the Qajar dynasty, styled His/Her Serene Highness)
9. Princes Baratashvili (Barataevy) (Georgian nobility)
10. Princes Barclay de Tolly (a branch of Clan Barclay; relations of Michael Barclay de Tolly raised to titular princes of the Russian Empire in 1815)
11. Princes Barclay de Tolly-Weimar (descendants of General Alexander Weymarn raised to Russian titular princes in 1859 as a relation to the Barclay de Tolly family)
12. Princes Bariatinsky (descended from Olgovichi branch of the Rurik dynasty)
13. Princes Bayushevy (Tatar; descendants of Mirza Bayush Razgildyaev raised to the princely title in 1613)
14. Princes Bebutov (Bebutashvili) (Georgian titular princes of Armenian origin; descended from merchants)
15. Princes Begildeevy (Tatars raised to the princely title in Muscovy in the 17th century)
16. Princes Begtabegovy (Begtabegishvili) (Georgian nobility of Armenian descent, raised to titular princes in Russia)
17. Princes Berezin (non-titled Vladimir-Suzdal Rurikids, descended from Prince Konstantin Yaroslavich, the younger brother of Alexander Nevsky)
18. Princes Bezborodko (descendants of Cossack Hetmanate senior ranks; the branch descended from Count Alexander Bezborodko raised to titular princes (styled as Serene Highness in 1797)
19. Princes Beznosov (non-titled Rurikids from the Monastyroyv family)
20. Princes Beloborodov (two families: Gediminids and Rurikids, a branch of the Beloborodov princely family)
21. Princes Beloselsky (Rurikids, a branch of the Belozersky princely family)
22. Princes Beloselsky-Belozersky (Rurikids, a branch of the Belozersky princely family, rulers of the Principality of Belozero)
23. Princes Bielski (two families: Gediminids and Rurikids (from the Yaroslavl branch).
24. Princes Bokeev (non-titled descendants of Smolensk Rurikids)
25. Princes Bolhovsky (Rurikids of disputed descent; according to Gennady Vlasiev, they were a branch of the Princes of Zvenigorod)
26. Princes Boryatinsky (Baryatinsky) (Rurikids, descendants of the Princes of Chernigov)
27. Princes Bunakov (non-titled Rurikids, descendants of the rulers of Karachev principality)

=== C ===
1. Princes Callivazis (of Greek Phanariote and Trapezuntine origin)
2. Princes Cantacuzene
3. Princes Cantacuzino (Moldavian nobility) counts Speransky
4. Princes Cantemir (Kantemir) (a family of Moldavian voivodes descended from Tatar Kantimur-murza)
5. Princes Chaabalyrhua (Abkhazian)
6. Princes Chanyshevy (Tatar, non-titled; claimed descent from the Kasymov prince Chyanysh Temgenev)
7. Princes Chavchavadze (Georgian nobility)
8. Princes Chegodaevy (Tatar) (non-titled; descended from Chegoday-hodzha who became a Moscow vassal in the 16th century)
9. Princes Chelokaevy or Cholokaevy (Cholokashvili)
10. Princes Cherkassky (Cherkaska) (Caucasian royalties; descended from Temryuk (mid-1500s), the grand duke of Kabarda)
11. Princes Cherkezov (Cherkezishvili) (Georgian nobility)
12. Princes Chernyshev (originated with Polish szlachta; descendants of Count Alexander Chernishov raised to titular princes, styled as Serene Highness)
13. Princes Chhotua (Abkhazian)
14. Princes Chichua (Abkhazian nobility)
15. Princes Chijavadze (Georgian nobility)
16. Princes Chikovani (Georgian appanage rulers)
17. Princes Chingis (Чингисы) (Genghisids)
18. Princes Chkheidze
19. Princes Chkonia
20. Princes Chkotua
21. Princes Cholokaevy (Cholokashvili)
22. Princes Czartoryski (Gediminids) (Polish princely house)

=== D ===
1. Princes Dabija (Moldavian nobility)
2. Princes Dadeshkeliani (Georgian petty princes)
3. Princes Dadiani (Dadian) (Georgian appanage princes)
4. Princes Dadiani (Dadianovy)
5. Princes Dadian-Migrelskie and the Princes of Dadian (Dadiani)
6. Princes Dashkovy (Tatar; non-titled, descendants of Mirza Dashek)
7. Princes Dashkovy (extinct, Rurikids, Smolensk branch)
8. Princes Devletkildeevy (Tatar; descendants of Baybas-Murza Devletkildeev)
9. Princes Dgebuadze (Georgian lower nobility, served to Princes Dadiani)
10. Princes Diasamidze (Georgian nobility)
11. Princes Diveevy (Tatar; descendants of Mirza Divey Butakov syn Mokshev, granted with rulership over Mordva by Ivan the Terrible)
12. Princes Dmitriev (Dmitriev-Netshin and Dmitriev-Mamonov) (non-titled branch of Smolensk Rurikids, descended from Prince Alexander Yuryevich Netsha; Dmitriev-Mamonov branch is originated with his great-grandson, Grigory Dmitiev-Netshin, nicknamed Mamon, a courtier at the court of Ivan III.
13. Princes Dolgorukov (claimed descent to Princes Obolensky)
14. Princes Dondukovy (descendants of Kalmyk ruler Donduk-Ombo)
15. Princes Dondukov-Izedinovy
16. Princes Dondukov-Korsakov
17. Princes Drutsky (princely family of disputed descent; rulers of the Principality of Drutsk)
18. Princes Drutsk-Lyubetskii (a branch of Princes Drutsky)
19. Princes Dzapsh-Ipa (Abkhazian)
20. Princes Dzhambakurian (Dzhambakur-Orbeliani
21. Princes Dzhambakur-Orbelianovy (Orbeliani)
22. Princes Dzhandierovy (Jandieri)

=== E ===
1. Prince Emukhvari (Emhaa, Emhua)
2. Prince Endronikovy (Georgian princely family claiming descent from Byzantine Emperors)
3. Prince Eristov (Georgian titular princes):
  - Eristov (Aragvi)
  - Eristov (Gurian)
  - Eristov (Ksani)
  - Eristov (Racha)

=== G ===
1. Princes Gagarin (Rurikids, a branch of the Princes of Starodub)
2. Princes Gagarin-Sturdza
3. Princes Galitzine (Gediminids)
4. Princes Galitzine
5. Princes Galitzine, Counts Osterman
6. Princes Gantimurovy (descendants of the Tungusian chieftain Gantimur, a vassal to China)
7. Princes Gedianovy (Tatar, descendants of Mirza Gedian who entered vassalage to Ivan the Terrible)
8. Princes Gedianovy (Tatar)
9. Princes Gelovani (Georgian high nobility)
10. Princes Genghis (3 branch of the family) (Kazakh royal family descended from Khan Abulhair; Genghisids)
11. Princes Giedroyc (Lithuanian princes, not Gediminids; claimed descent from Prince Gedrus, a relation of Grand Duke Traidenis)
12. Princes Glinski (Lithuanian nobility; claimed descent from the Tatar warlord Mamai)
13. Princes Golenishchev-Kutuzov-Smolensky
14. Princes Golitsyn, Golovkin
15. Princes Gorchakov (officially considered Rurikids; disputed genealogy, as the Rurikid prince they claimed descent from was not confirmed by written sources)
16. Princes Gruzinsky (a branch of the Bagration royal family; the offspring of King Vakhtang V)
17. Princes Gruzinsky (Kakhetian branch, the offspring of King Irakli II)
18. Princes Gugunava (Georgian nobility)
19. Princes Gundorovy (Rurikids, a branch of Princes Paletsky, descended from the Princes of Starodub)
20. Princes Guramovy (Guramishvili) (2 kinds) (Georgian nobility)
21. Princes Gurgenidze
22. Princes Gurieli (Georgian appanage princes)
23. Princes Gyachba (Abkhazian)

=== H ===
1. Princes Herkheulidze (Herheulidzevy) (2 kinds) (Georgian nobility)
2. Princes Hidirbegovy (Georgian nobility)
3. Princes Khilkovy (Rurikids, a branch of the Princes of Starodub)
4. Princes Himshievy (Georgian nobility)
5. Princes Hodzhaminasovy (Georgian nobility of Armenian descent)
6. Princes Khovansky (Gediminids)

=== I ===
1. Princes Ilyinsky (then Prince Romanovsky Elijah)
2. Princes Imeretian
3. Princes Inal-Ipa (Abkhazian)
4. Princes Isheevy (Tatar, non-titled; descended from Mirza Ishey Barashev))
5. Princes Italiysky, counts Suvorov-Rymniksky (titular princes of the Russian Empire from Alexander Suvorov)

=== J ===
1. Princes Japaridze
2. Princes Javakhishvili (Dzhavahovy Zhevahovy)
3. Princes Jorjadze

=== K ===
1. Princes Karalovy (Karalishvili)
2. Princes Kargolomskie
3. Princes Kasatkiny-Rostovsky (Rurikids, a branch of Princes of Rostov)
4. Princes Kashin-Obolensky (a branch of the Obolensky family)
5. Princes Katkov-Shalikov (Georgian nobility)
6. Princes Kavkasidze
7. Princes Kekuatovy (Keykuatovy) (Tatar; non-titled, descendants of a Nogai nobleman Atmanay Urusov syn Keykuatov)
8. Princes Kildishevy (Tatar, non-titled; descendants of Mirza Ishmamet Kildishev))
9. Princes Kipiani
10. Princes Kobulov (Kobulashvili)
11. Princes Kochakidze
12. Princes Kochubey (descendants of Vasily Kochubey, a senior rank at the Cossack Hetmanate, claiming descent from a Crimean Tatar named Kuchuk-bey of supposedly princely origin).
13. Princes Koltsovs-Mosalsky (a branch of the Mosalsky family, Lithuanian Rurikids)
14. Princes Komnenos (descendants of the Trebizond Megas Komnenos branch),
15. Princes Kondratevskaya
16. Princes Koribut-Voronetskii (Gediminids, a branch of Princes Zbararzski)
17. Princes Korkodinovy (Smolensk Rurikids)
18. Princes Kozelsky (Chernigov Rurikids)
19. Princes Kozlovsky (Smolensk Rurikids)
20. Princes Kropotkin (Smolensk Rurikids)
21. Princes Kudashevy (Tatar; non-titled, descendants of a Tatar nobleman Kudash))
22. Princes Kugushevy (Tatar)
23. Princes Kulunchakovy (Tatar; non-titled, descendants of Kulunchak Enikeev descended from ruler of Meschera)
24. Princes Kurakins (Gediminids)
25. Princes Kurbsky (possibly extinct; Yaroslavl Rurikids)
26. Princes Kurtsevichi
27. Princes Kutkiny (Tatar; non-titled, descended from Mirza Never Kutkin granted with a fief in Muscovy)
28. Princes Kutyevy (Tatar)

=== L ===
1. Princes Lieven (from Baltic German nobility of German descent; raised to titular princes by Nicholas I)
2. Princes Lionidze
3. Princes Lobanov-Rostovsky (Rurikids, a branch of the Princes of Rostov)
4. Princes Lopukhin (from Russian gentry, raised to titular princes (styled as Serene Highness) for relation to the Romanovs through marriage; extinct)
5. Princes Lopukhin
6. Princes Lopukhin-Demidoff (on the rights of primogeniture; the descendants of Nikolay Demidov, a relation of the first Lopukhin prince)
7. Princes Lortkipanidze
8. Princess Łowicz (Łowicz)
9. Princes Lubomirski (Polish magnates; titular princes of the Holy Roman Empire)
10. Princes of Lutsk (historical rulers of the Principality of Lutsk, Volhynia; Rurikids)
11. Princes Lvov (Yaroslavl Rurikids)
12. Princes Lyapunov (non-titled descendants of Vladimir-Suzdal Rurikids)
13. Princes Lyschinskie-Troyekurov

=== M ===
1. Princes Machabelovy (Mauch, a favorite of Peter the Great, related to the Romanovs through marriage)
2. Princes Machutadze
3. Princes Magalov (Maghalashvili)
4. Princes Makayeu (Makashvili)
5. Princes Maksimenishvili
6. Princes Maksutov (Tatar; descendants of the princes of Kasimov)
7. Princes Maksyutova (Tatar)
8. Princes Mamatkazin-Sakaevy (Tatar)
9. Princes Mamatov (Tatar; non-titled, descendants of Mirza Elizary Akmametievich Mamatov)
10. Princes Mamleev (Tatar; descendants of Mirza Mamley)
11. Princes Mansyrev (Tatar; non-titled, descendants of Mirza Einandar Mansyrev who received an rulership over Mordva from Vasily III of Moscow)
12. Princes Manvelovy (Georgian nobility)
13. Princes Massalsky, Massalski (Mosalsky) (Upper-Oka Rurikids, rulers of the Principality of Mosalsk)
14. Princes Mavrocordato (Sciot Phanariot Greeks)
15. Princes Melikov (Melikishvili) (3 kinds)
16. Princes Menshikov (extinct titular princes of the Holy Roman Empire and Russian Empire, offspring of Alexander Menshikov, a favorite of Peter the Great)
17. Princes Menshikov-Koreysha
18. Princes Meschersky (Tatar, originating with Crimean high nobility; descendants of the ruler of Meschera)
19. Princes Mikadze
20. Princes Mikeladze
21. Princes Mingrelia (on the rights of primogeniture)
22. Princes Mkheidze
23. Princes Monastyryov (non-titled boyar family descended from Smolensk Rurikids)
24. Princes Mourousi
25. Princes Mstislavsky (Gediminids)
26. Princes Musorgsky (non-titled descendants of Smolensk Rurikids, the family of composer Modest Musorgsky)
27. Princes Mustafin (Tatar; descendants of tsarevich Murtaza Mustafich))
28. Princes Myshetsky (disputed descent; officially considered Rurikids from the Tarusa princely family)

=== N ===
1. Princes Nakashidze (Georgian nobility)
2. Princes Nasedkin
3. Princes Nesvitski (extinct Lithuanian princely family of disputed descent)
4. Princes Nizharadze
5. Princes Novosilski (extinct; Rurikids, rulers of the Principality of Novosil)

=== O ===
1. Princes Obolensky (Rurikids, a branch of the Princes of Tarusa)
2. Princes Obolensky-Neledinsky-Mielec
3. Princes Odoyevsky (extinct; Rurikids, a branch of the Princes of Novosil)
4. Princes Odoevskys-Maslov (the rights of primogeniture)
5. Princes Ogiński (Lithuanian princely family of disputed descent; claimed descent from Rurik)
6. Princes Orbeliani (Orbelianovy Orbelyanovy)
7. Princes Orlov (descendants of General Alexey Orlov, son of Fyodor Orlov, a favorite of Catherine II, raised to titular princes in 1856)
8. Princes von der Osten-Sacken (Baltic German gentry, raised to titular princes in 1786)
9. Princes Ostrogski (Lithuanian magnates of disputed descent)

=== P ===
1. Princes Pagava
2. Princes Palavandovy (Palavandishvili)
3. Princes Paley
4. Princes Paskevich
5. Princes Patrikeevy (historical Gediminid family, believed to be paternal to Russian Gediminids)
6. Princes Pavlenishvili (Pavlenovy) (Georgian princely family of Persian royal descent)
7. Princes Persidskii also Bahmanov (Persian; descendants of the Persian Prince Bahman Mirza; a branch of the Qajar dynasty, styled Serene Highness)
8. Princes of Polotsk (rulers of the Principality of Polotsk)
9. Princes Poryus-Vizapurskie
10. Princes Potemkin-Tavricheski (Grigory Potyomkin-Tavericheski was raised to titular princes (styled Serene Highness) by Catherine II in 1776, died childless)
11. Princes Pozharsky (extinct; Rurikids, a branch of the princes of Starodub)
12. Princes of Pronsk
13. Princes Prozorovsky-Galitzine
14. Princes Prozorovsky-Golitsyns
15. Princes Putyatin (a branch of the Drutsky princely family)
16. Princes Puzyna (non-titled; a family of disputed descent, claimed as descended from the Princes of Kozelsk)

=== R ===
1. Princes Radzivill (Polish-Lithuanian magnates; titular princes of the Holy Roman Empire)
2. Princes Ratievy (Ratishvili)
3. Princes Razumovsky
4. Princes Repnin (extinct Rurikids, a branch of the Obolensky family)
5. Princes Repnin-Volkonskie
6. Princes Robitovy (Robitashvili)
7. Princess Romanov (Golitsyn)
8. Princess Romanov (de Goshtoni)
9. Princess Romanov-Knust
10. Princess Romanov-Kurakina
11. Princess Romanov (Mac Dugall)
12. Princess Romanov-Paul
13. Princess Romanovskaya-Strelna
14. Prince Romanovsky-Brasov
15. Prince Romanovsky Elijah
16. Prince Romanovsky-Iskander
17. Prince Romanovsky-Krasinsky
18. Prince Romanovsky-Kutuzov
19. Princes Romodanovsky (extinct Rurikids, a branch of the Princes of Starodub)
20. Princes Romodanovsky-Lodyzhenskii
21. Princes Rostov-Katyrevy
22. Princes Rusievy (Rusishvili)
23. Princes Rzhevsky (non-titled descendants of Smolensk Rurikids)

=== S ===
1. Princes Saakadze
2. Princes Saginovy (Saginashvili)
3. Prince Saltykovs (descendants of Count Nikolay Saltykov who received the title of serene prince in 1814)
4. Princes Saltykov-Golovkin
5. Princes of San Donato (Demidov family)
6. Princes Sangushko (Gediminids)
7. Princes Sapieha (Polish-Lithuanian magnates; in the 17th century two Sapiehas received the princely title of the Holy Roman Empire, but both died childless; the current descendants of the family use the title without due right; there is a comital line of the family, however, raised to counts of the Holy Roman Empire)
8. Princes Satyginy-Kondiyskie (descendants of Mansi chieftains)
9. Princes Sayn-Wittgenstein-Berleburg-Ludwigsburg (German imperial counts; Pyotr Wittgenstein received the title of "serene prince" in Russia in 1834; Russian princes without the German nobiliary particle "von")
10. Princes Shahaevy (Tatar; non-titled)
11. Princes Shahonsky (extinct; Yaroslavl Rurikids)
12. Princes Shakhovskoy (Yaroslavl Rurikids)
13. Princes Shakhovskoi-Glebov-Streshneva (combined name - only the eldest in the family)
14. Princes Shalikov (Shalikashvili)
15. Princes Shat-Ipa (Abkhazian)
16. Princes Shchepin-Rostov (Rostov Rurikids)
17. Princes Shcherbatovy (Rurikids; a branch of the Obolensky family)
18. Princes Shchetinin (Yaroslavl Rurikids)
19. Princes Sheleshpansky (Rurikids; a branch of Princes Belozersky)
20. Princes Shervashidze
21. Princes Shirinskie-Shikhmatov (Tatar; descendants of the Tatar aristocratic clan named Shir)
22. Princes Shuiskys (Suzdal Rurikids):
  - Kirdyapiny-Shuiskys
  - Skopin-Shuiskys
  - Humped-Shuiskys
23. Princes Shumarovsky (Yaroslavl Rurikids; paternal to the Shamin, Golygin and Hodyryov families)
24. Princes Sibirsky (formerly bore the title of princes; Genghisids)
25. Princes Sidamonovy (Sidamon-Eristovy Sidamonidze) (Georgian nobility)
26. Noble family Skarzynski(Belarusian-Russian nobles)
27. Princes Skryabin (non-titled descendants of Smolensk Rurikids; a branch of the Travin noble family)
28. Princes Solagovy (Solagashvili) (Georgian nobility)
29. Princes Sontsovy-Zasyekins (Rurikids, a branch of the Zasyekin princely family)
30. Princes of Starodub (Rurikids; historical rulers of the Principality of Starodub)
31. Princes Stokasimovy (Tatar; descendants of Mirza Irezen Stokasimov)
32. Princess Strelna (then Princess Romanov-Strelna)
33. Princes Sumbatov (Sumbatashvili)
34. Princes Svyatopolk-Chetvertinsky (Lithuanian princely family; disputed descent: Rurikid and Gediminid)
35. Princes Sviatopolk-Mirsky (Svyatopolk-Mirsky, Swiatopolk-Mirsky, descent from Rurik; disputed by some few genealogists)

=== T ===
1. Princes Taktakovy (Taktakishvili)
2. Princes Tarhanova-Mouravovy (Tarhan-Mouravi) (Georgian appanage princes)
3. Princes Tarkovsky (with the rights of primogeniture)
4. Princes Tatevs (extinct; Rurikids; a branch of Princes Ryapolovsky (a branch of the Princes of Starodub)
5. Princes Tatishchev (non-titled descendants of Smolensk Rurikids)
6. Princes Tavdgiridze
7. Princes Telyatevsky (extinct; Rurikids, descendants of the House of Tver)
8. Princes Tyomkin-Rostovsky (extinct; Rurikids, a branch of the princes of Rostov)
9. Princes Tenishevo (Tatar; Meschera Mirzas and Nogai Mirzas)
10. Princes Torussky (Rurikids; ruler of the Principality of Tarusa; paternal to princes Koninsky, Spazhski, Myshetsky, Obolensky, and Mezetsky)
11. Princes Travin (non-titled branch of Smolensk Rurikids; descended from boyar Semyon Ivanovich Trava, whose offspring were ranked as boyar scions)
12. Princes Trankovsky
13. Princes Trubetskoy (Gediminids)
14. Princes Tsereteli
15. Princes Tsitsishvili (Tsitsianov) (Georgian high nobility)
16. Princes Tsulukidze
17. Princes Tumanishvili (Tumanov) (Georgian appanage princes)
18. Princes Tumanova-Levashev
19. Princes Turkestanovy (Turkistanovy Turkistanishvili) (Georgian nobility)
20. Princes of Turov-Pinsk (historical Rurikid rulers of the Turov-Pinsk principality)
21. Princes Tusievy (Tusishvili) (Georgian nobility)
22. Princes Tyufyakiny (an extinct branch of the Obolensky family)

=== U ===
1. Princes of Uglich (historical Rurikids, rulers of the Uglich principality)
2. Princes Ukhtomsky (Rurikids, a branch of Princes Belozersky)
3. Princes Urusov (Tatar; descendants of the Nogai warlord Edygei; related to the Yusupovs)
4. Princes Urman (of Norwegian descent)

=== V ===
1. Princes Vachnadze
2. Princes Vadbolsky (Rurikids, a branch of Princes Belozersky)
3. Princes Vakhvahovy (Vakhvakhishvili) (Georgian nobility)
4. Princes Vasilchikov (a branch of the Durnovo family, raised to the Moscow court through a relation to the Tolstoys; General and favorite of Nikolay I, Illarion Vasilchikov, received the title of prince in 1836)
5. Princes Vizirovy (Vezirishvili) (Georgian titular princes of Iranian descent)
6. Princes Volkonsky (Rurikids; a branch of the Princes of Tarusa)
7. Princes Voloshin
8. Princes Vorontsov (in 1845 Michael Vorontsov received the title of "serene prince")
9. Princes Vorontsov, counts Shuvalov (the son of Prince Michael Vorontsov, Semyon, died childless; in 1882 his maternal relation count Pavel Shuvalov was allowed using the title and arms of Princes Vorontsov)
10. Princes Vorotynsky (extinct Rurikids; a branch of the House of Novosil)
11. Princes Vyazemsky (Smolensk Rurikids)

=== W ===
1. Princes of Warsaw, count Paskevich-Erivanski (descendants of Ivan Paskevich of Ukrainian Cossack origins; in 1831 he was raised to titular "serene prince")
2. Princes Sayn-Wittgenstein

=== Y ===
1. Princes Yeletsky (non-titled descendants of the rulers of Yelets principality, Chernigov Rurikids)
2. Princes Yuryevsky (descended from the illegitimate offspring of Alexander II and Ekaterina Dolgorukov; later they received the title of serene princes)
3. Princes Yusupov (extinct; Tatar, descendants of the Nogai bey Yusuf-Murza (Josef), related to the Urusov family)

=== Z ===
1. Princes Zaslavsky (Gediminids)
2. Princes Zaslavsky (a branch of the Ostrogski family)
3. Princes Zasyekins (possibly extinct [disputed]; Yaroslavl Rurikids)
4. Princes Zajączek (Polish szlachta, which itself is non-titled; in 1815 Josef Zajączek was granted the title of prince and the office of the Polish viceroy under the Russian Crown)
5. Princes Zbaraski (Lithuanian appanage princely family of disputed descent; Gediminid or Rurikid)
6. Princes Zhizhemsky (Żyżemski) (Lithuanian princes descended from Smolensk Rurikids)
7. Princes Žilina
8. Princes Zvenigorodsky (possibly extinct; Chernigov Rurikids; descended from the rulers of the Zvenigorod principality)
9. Princes Zubov (titular princes of the Holy Roman Empire and Russia: 1793, 1796; relations of Platon Zubov, the last favorite of Catherine II)

== Sources ==
- List of princes families on site of Grand Duchess Maria Vladimirovna
