= Kirill V. Larin =

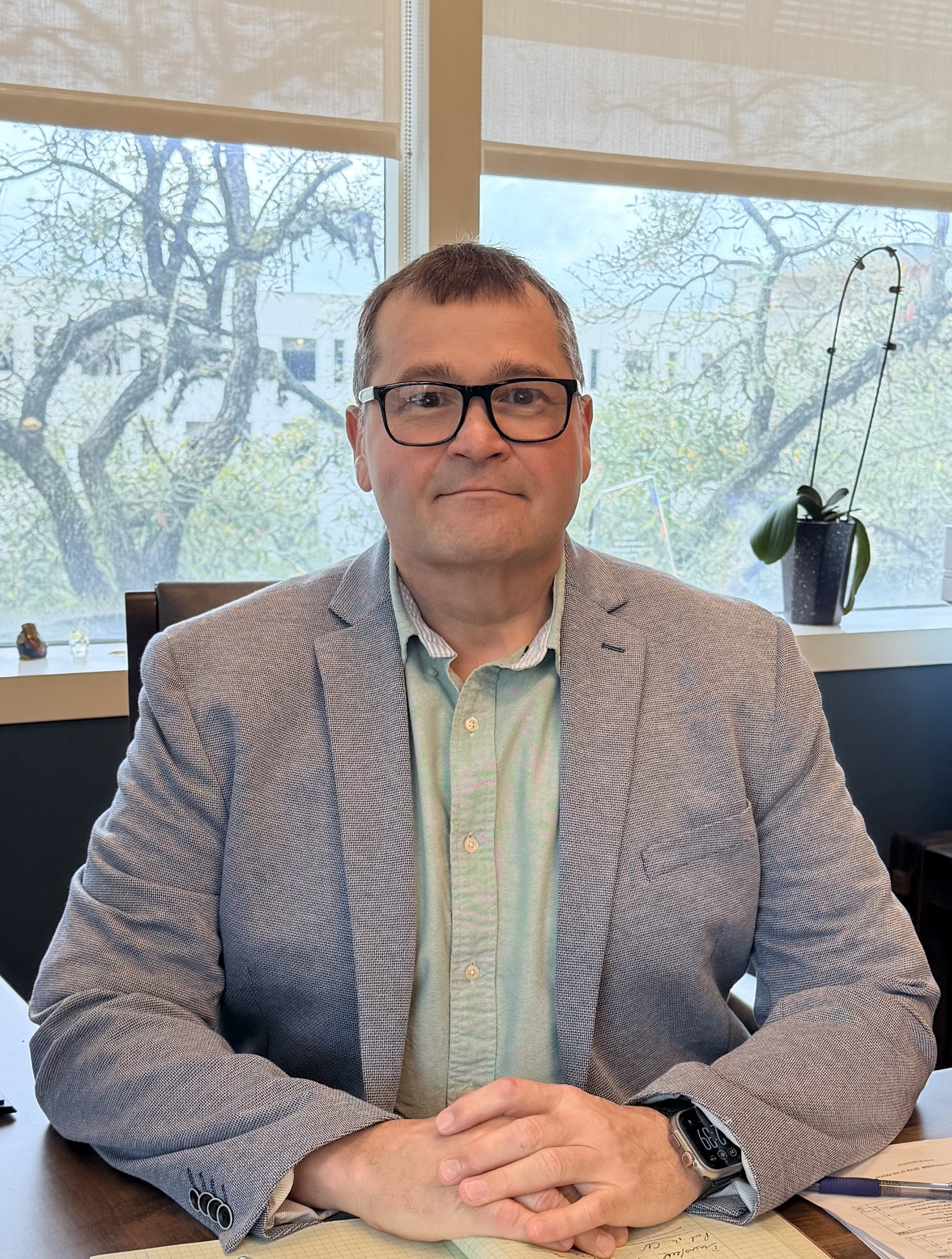
- Born: Russia
- Occupation: Academic
- Employer: University of Houston
- Known for: Development and applications of optical coherence tomography, optical coherence elastography
- Title: Cullen Endowed Chair and Professor
- Awards: Herbert Allen Award, American Society of Mechanical Engineers (2008); Fellow of SPIE (2015); Fellow of Optica (2016); Fellow of the American Institute for Medical and Biological Engineering (2020); SPIE Biophotonics Technology Innovator Award (2025)

Academic background
- Education: Saratov State University; University of Texas Medical Branch

Kirill Vladimirovich Larin is an American academic who is the Cullen Endowed Chair and Professor of biomedical engineering at the University of Houston (UH). He currently serves as the chair of the Department of Biomedical Engineering and holds a joint appointment as an adjunct professor of physiology and biophysics at the Baylor College of Medicine. Larin is recognized for the development and application of optical coherence tomography and elastography.

== Early life and education ==
Larin was born in Russia. He attended Saratov State University, where he earned a bachelor's degree in physics and a master's degree in laser physics and mathematics. In the late 1990s, he relocated to the United States for graduate studies at the University of Texas Medical Branch (UTMB) in Galveston. He obtained a master's degree in cellular physiology and molecular biophysics in 2001 and completed his Ph.D. in biomedical sciences and biomedical engineering in 2002.

== Career ==
Following a post-doctoral fellowship at UTMB, Larin joined the faculty at the University of Houston in the mid-2000s. He eventually attained the position of tenured professor and was appointed the Cullen Endowed Chair of Biomedical Engineering. In 2025, he was named chair of the Department of Biomedical Engineering. He also holds a joint faculty appointment in the UH College of Optometry. He is also the director of the Biomedical Optics Laboratory.

Larin also serves as an Adjunct Associate Professor of Molecular Physiology and Biophysics at Baylor College of Medicine. He is also the founding chair of the SPIE annual conference on Optical Elastography and Tissue Biomechanics.

== Research ==
Larin's research focuses on the development of noninvasive optical imaging and sensing techniques. He utilizes optical coherence tomography (OCT) to visualize embryonic development, achieving high-resolution in utero images of cardiovascular formation in mammalian embryos. His laboratory has captured 3D and 4D images of murine heart development to study congenital defects and neural tube closure.

Larin also helped establish optical coherence elastography (OCE), a technique used to measure the mechanical properties of tissues. His group developed methods to map the elasticity of structures such as the cornea, skin, and blood vessels, with applications in detecting eye diseases and monitoring cardiovascular tissue stiffness. Other research initiatives include laser-based imaging for assessing embryo viability in in vitro fertilization (IVF) and optical monitoring of decompression sickness.

== Awards and recognition ==
Early in his career, Larin received a Presidential Award for young scientists in Russia. In the United States, he was the recipient of a Wallace H. Coulter Foundation Young Investigator Award in 2006 and an Office of Naval Research (ONR) Young Investigator Award in 2007. In 2008, he received the Outstanding Young Scientist Award from the Houston Society for Engineering in Medicine and Biology and the Herbert Allen Award from the American Society of Mechanical Engineers (ASME).

Larin was named a Fellow of SPIE in 2015 and a Fellow of Optica (formerly the Optical Society) in 2016. In 2020, he was inducted into the College of Fellows of the American Institute for Medical and Biological Engineering (AIMBE). In 2025, he received the SPIE Biophotonics Technology Innovator Award.
