= Zhongping Chen =

Biomedical engineering professor at UC Irvine

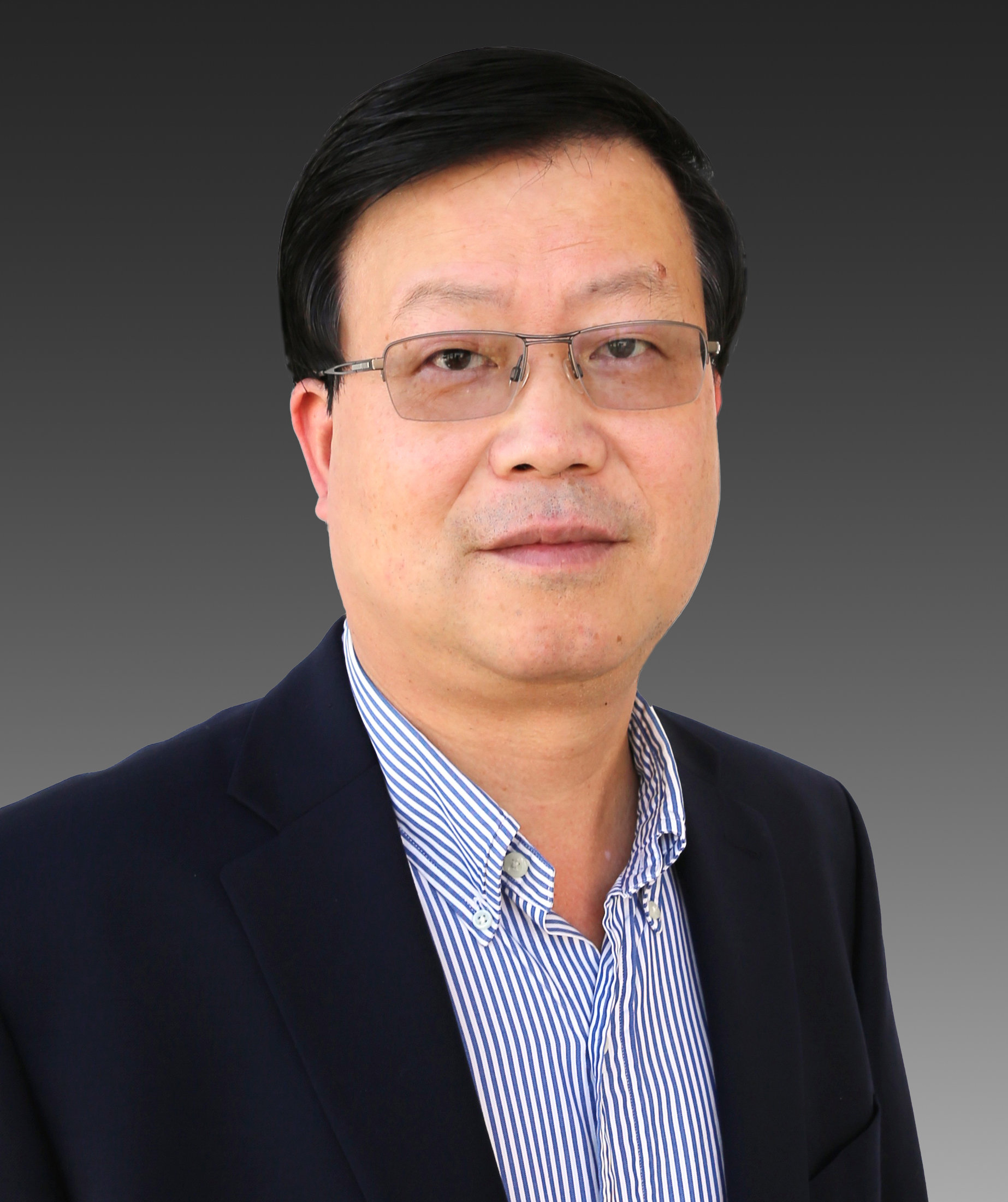
- Education: Shanghai Jiao Tong University (BS); Cornell University (MS, PhD)
- Known for: Optical coherence tomography, Doppler optical coherence tomography
- Scientific career
- Fields: Biomedical engineering, Optical engineering
- Workplaces: University of California, Irvine

Zhongping Chen is a Distinguished Professor of Biomedical Engineering at the University of California, Irvine (UCI). His research focuses on the development of Optical Coherence Tomography (OCT) and its functional extensions for medical imaging.

== Education and career ==
Chen received his bachelor's degree from Shanghai Jiao Tong University and his M.S. and Ph.D. degrees from Cornell University. He leads the Functional Optical Coherence Tomography (F-OCT) Laboratory at UCI.

== Research ==
Zhongping Chen’s research focuses on optical coherence tomography (OCT) and its functional extensions for biomedical imaging. His published work includes early studies on Doppler OCT (D-OCT), a method for measuring blood flow in microcirculation, and OCT angiography (OCTA) for mapping microvasculature. He has also reported research on optical coherence elastography (OCE) and related functional OCT techniques.

== Awards and honors ==
- Fellow, American Institute for Medical and Biological Engineering (2005)
- Fellow, Optica (2007)
- Fellow, SPIE
- Michael S. Feld Biophotonics Award (2024)
- Distinguished Senior Faculty Award for Research, University of California, Irvine Academic Senate (2026).
