= Patrikeyev family =

Patrikeyev family may refer to one of the two Russian noble families.

Patrikeyev princes is an extinct ancient Russian princely family of Gediminids tracing from Патрикий Наримонтович, Patrikiy Narimontovich (Patrikas), son of Narimantas, i.e. a grandson of Gediminas.

Patrikeyev dvoryans is an ancient dvoryan Russian family, first mentioned in 1536 among the benefactors of the Serpukhov Monastery.

== See also ==
- Patrikeyev, surname
