= Mustafin =

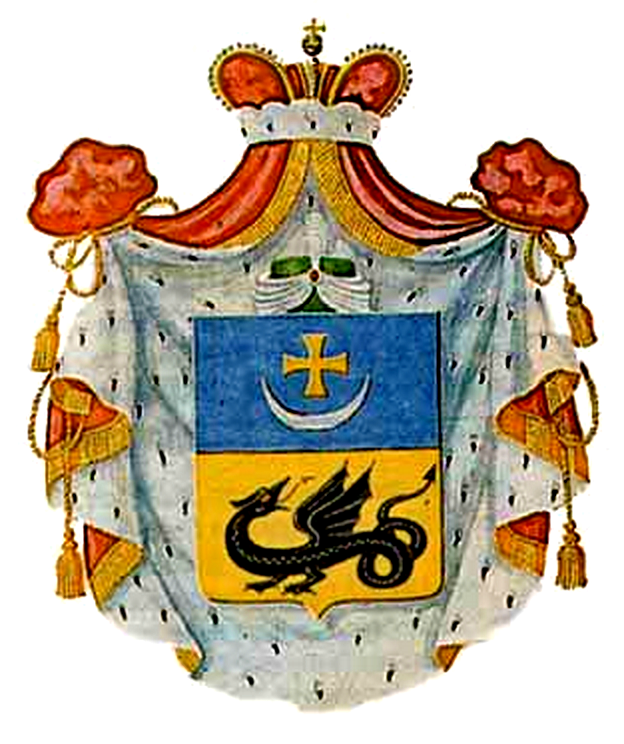
Coat of arms of Princes Mustafin

The House of Mustafin is an old Russian noble family of Tatar origin, descendants of tsarevich Murtaza Mustafich, whose members held the title of Knyaz in the Russian Empire. Mustafin (Russian: Мустафин) is also a Bashkir, Tatar and Uzbek masculine surname, which is common in the countries of the former Soviet Union; its feminine counterpart is Mustafina.

== Notable people ==
- Aliya Mustafina (born 1994), Russian artistic gymnast
- Farhat Mustafin (born 1950), Russian wrestler
- Gabiden Mustafin (1902–1984), Kazakh author and politician
- Isaac Mustafin (1908–1968), Russian chemist
- Mikhail Mustafin (born 1983), Russian football player
- Oleksiy Mustafin (born 1971), Ukrainian media manager, journalist, and politician
- Rifat Mustafin (born 1983), Russian football player
- Rustam Mustafin (born 1977), Russian football player
- Temur Mustafin (born 1995), Russian football player
