= Nicolae Dabija =

Nicolae Dabija may refer to:

- Nicolae Dabija (general) (1837–1884), Romanian general and politician
- Nicolae Dabija (soldier) (1907–1949), Romanian anti-communist resistance leader
- Nicolae Dabija (writer) (1948–2021), former member of the Moldovan Parliament

== See also ==
- Dabija
