= Vera Afanasyeva =

Russian academic

Vera Vladimirovna Afanasyeva
- Education: Saratov State University
- Scientific career
- Institutions: Saratov State University

Vera Vladimirovna Afanasyeva (Russian: Вера Владимировна Афанасьева) is a professor at the Saratov State University and author, PhD in Philosophy, Member of the Petrovskaya Academy of Sciences and Arts.

Vera Afanasyeva was born and lives in Saratov. She graduated from the Saratov State University in 1984, and earned her Candidat degree in 1991. In 2002, she defended her doctoral thesis.

Afanasyeva is the author of 10 monographs and about 200 scientific articles.

She has two daughters.
