= Ukhtomsky =

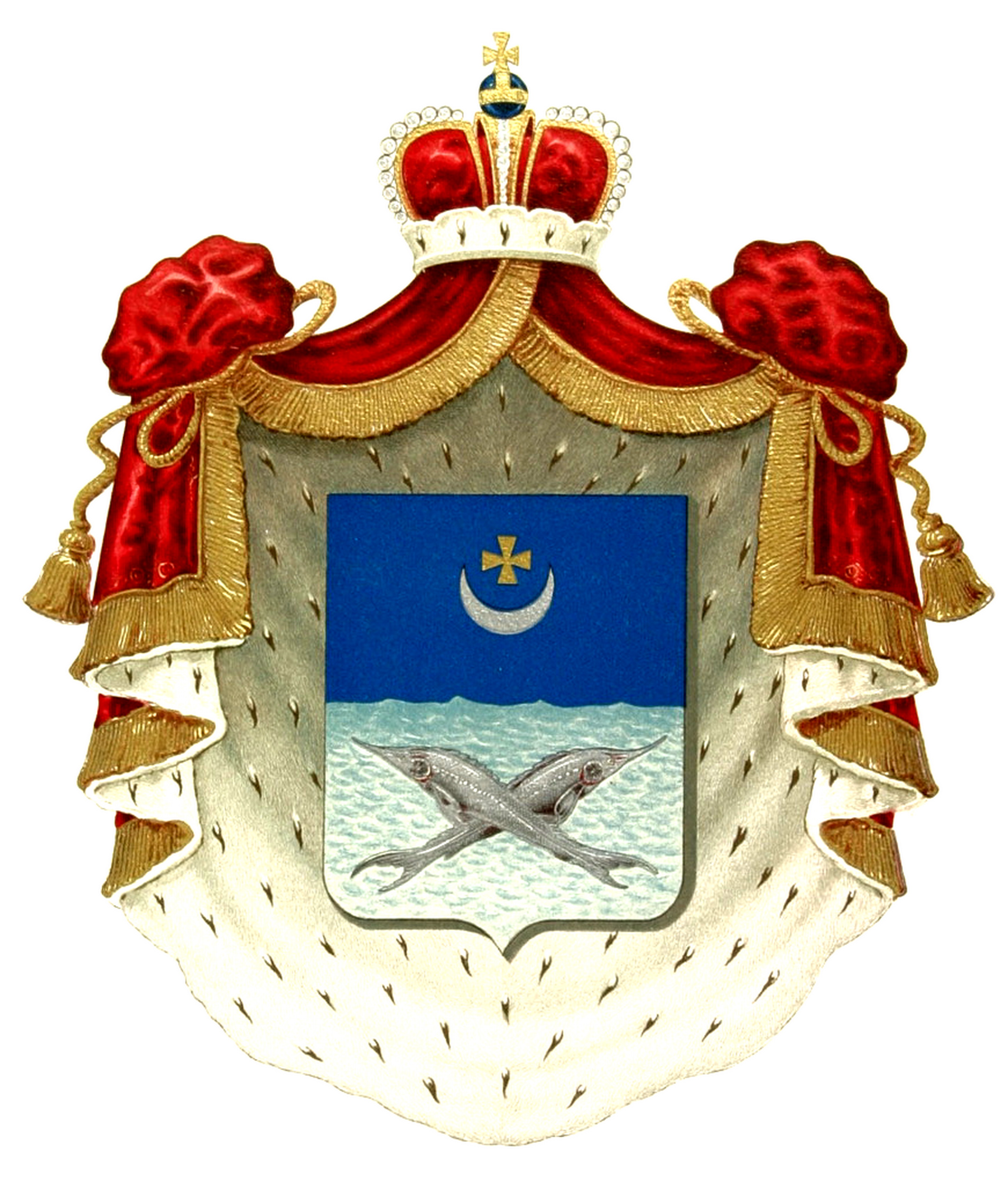
Coat of arms of the Princes Ukhtomsky

The House of Ukhtomsky (Russian: У́хтомский), alternatively Ukhtomskii, Oechtomski, Ouhtomski, Ukhtomskiy, Ukhtomski, Ukhtomskii, Oukhtomsky, Oukhtomski, Ookhtomsky is an old Russian princely family, part of the Russian nobility, descended from the Rurik Dynasty.

== Surname ==
It is also a Russian surname.

== Notable members ==
- Prince Dmitry Ukhtomsky (1719–1774), an architect.
- Prince Esper Ukhtomsky (1861–1921), an orientalist, poet, and courtier. Also served as an adviser to Tsar Nicholas II.
- Alexei Alexeyevich Ukhtomsky, (1875–1942), a Russian physiologist
- Prince Pavel Petrovich Ukhtomsky (1849-1910), Vice Admiral in the Imperial Russian Navy
- Prince Fyodor Ukhtomsky (1877—1934), a carrier officer, took part in the World War I, in the Russian Civil War and in anti-Soviet activities from Harbin.
- Princess Alla Ukhtomsky (1904—1976), the first daughter of Prince Fyodor Ukhtomsky.
- Princess Kira Ukhtomsky, (1906—1971), the second daughter of Prince Fyodor Ukhtomsky.
- Princess Nonna Ukhtomsky, (1910—1954), the third daughter of Prince Fyodor Ukhtomsky.
