= Kabulov =

Kabulov (Russian: Кабулов), in feminine form Kabulova (Russian: Кабуловa), is a Turkic Russian last name and may refer to:

- Akmurad Kabulov, Turkmen major general - see Military of Turkmenistan
- Farmon Kabulov, Uzbek judoka - see 2011 World Judo Championships – Men's 81 kg
- Georgy Kabulov, Russian footballer
- Saodat Kabulova (1925–2007), Uzbek opera singer (soprano), actress, and music teacher
- Zamir Kabulov (born 1954), Russian diplomat

== See also ==
- Kobulov
