= Abel Makashvili =

Georgian and Russian general (1860–1920)

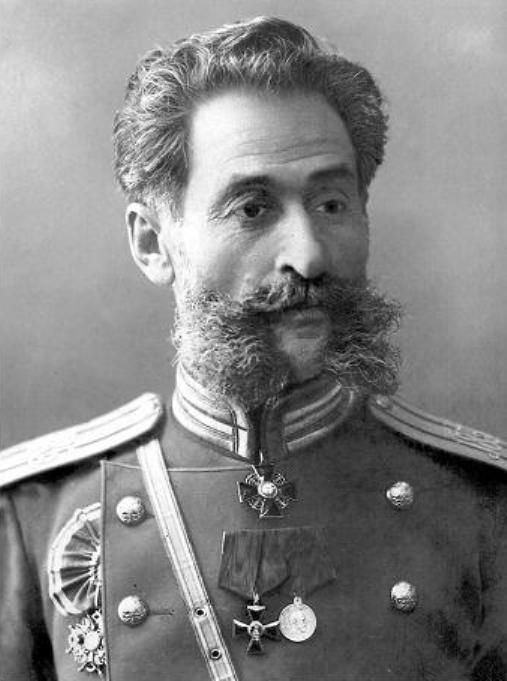
Abel Makashvili

Abel Makashvili (Georgian: აბელ მაყაშვილი)(June 6, 1860 – June 1920) was a Georgian prince and military leader who held important roles first in the Russian Imperial Army and later in the Georgian Army. He was killed by the Bolsheviks in 1920.

== Biography ==
Born of an old Georgian noble family, Makashvili graduated from Elizavetgrad military progymnasium and Kazan infantry junker school. He joined the Imperial Russian army in 1877 and commanded Bash-Kadyklar infantry regiment since 1910. He was promoted to major-general in 1914 and put in charge of the 16th Mingrelian grenadier regiment from 1914 to 1917.

Following Georgia’s declaration of independence from Russia, Makashvili joined the national Georgian army. He served as a governor-general and military commandant of Tiflis in the years 1918-1920.

Early in 1920, he was invited by the government of independent Azerbaijan to head a military school at Ganja. After Sovietization of Azerbaijan in April 1920, Makashvili was killed. According to one version, he was arrested by the Soviet authorities and drowned in the Caspian Sea. According to another version, he was killed by Armenian terrorists on the orders of the Dashnaktsutyun party.

Makashvili’s sons also served in the military. One of them, Vakhtang, commanded the Georgian Air Force and died when the airplane he piloted crashed at Tiflis in 1921.

== See also ==
- Ivane Jambakurian-Orbeliani
- Alexander Imeretinsky
- Ivane Bagration of Mukhrani
- Ivane Andronikashvili
