= Paskevich =

Paskevich (Russian: Паске́вич; Ukrainian: Паске́вич)
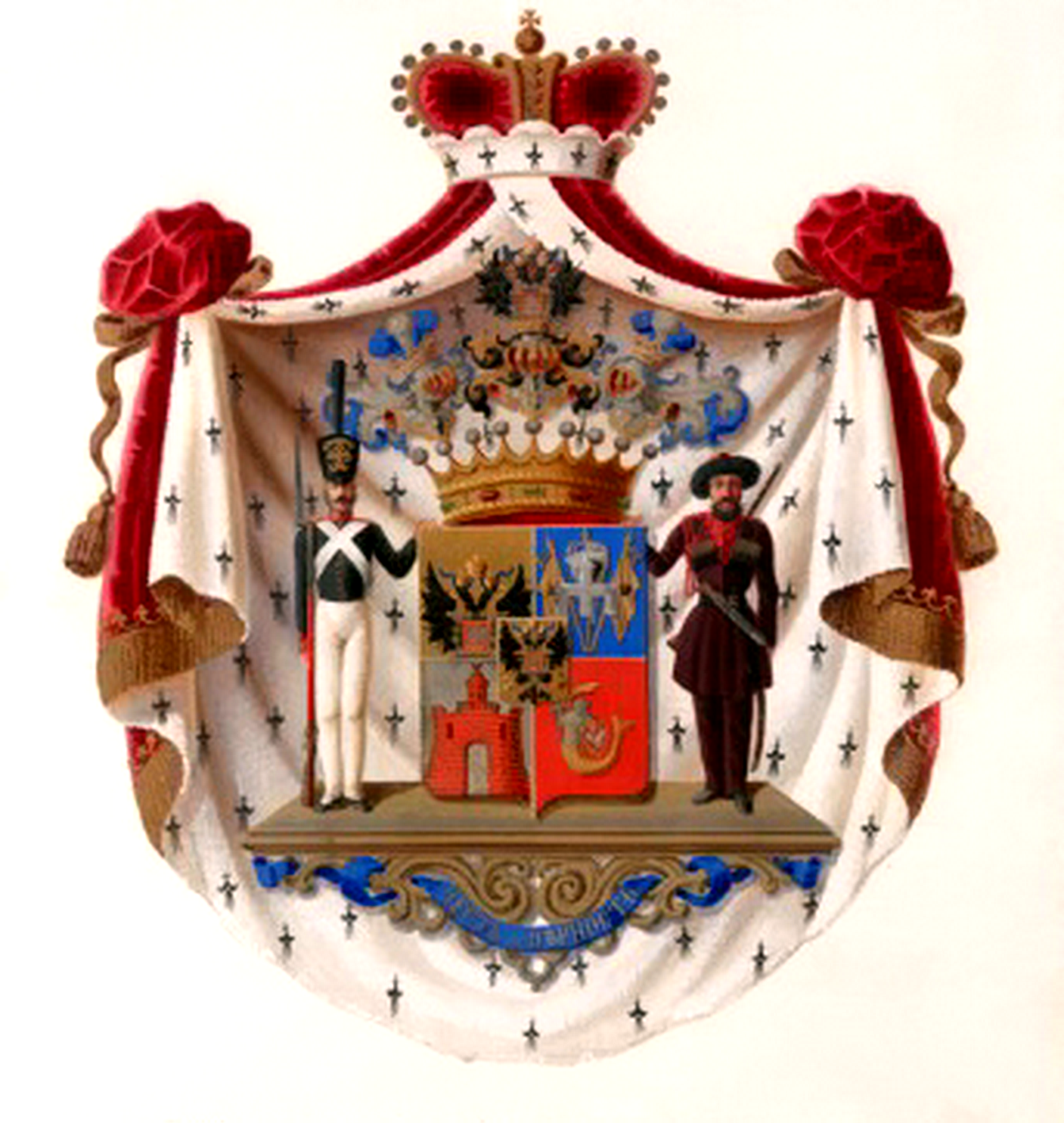

Origin
- Languages: Russian, Ukrainian
- Meaning: son of Pasko (Пасько)
- Region of origin: Eastern Europe

The House of Paskevich is an old Russian princely family, part of the Russian nobility, of Ukrainian Cossack origin. The transliteration from Ukrainian is Paskevych. Members of the family held the title of Knyaz and Count. The untitled branch of this noble house was the Pashkov family.

== Notable surname bearers ==
- Ivan Paskevich (1782–1856), field marshal in the Russian, Prussian, and Austrian armies
- Nicolay Paskevich (1907–2003), painter
