= Semyon Belozyorov =

Soviet and Russian mathematician

- Born: Semyon Yefimovich Belozyorov; 6 February 1904
- Died: 1987 (aged 82–83)
- Occupation: Mathematician

Semyon Yefimovich Belozyorov (Russian: Семён Ефимович Белозёров; 6 February 1904 – 1987) was a Soviet and Russian mathematician and a specialist in the field of history of mathematics. Professor, Candidate of Physical and Mathematical Sciences, director of Rostov State University in 1938–1954.

== Biography ==
Semyon Yefimovich Belozyorov was born on 6 February 1904. He studied at the Kulikovo village school in Kalachinsky District of Omsk Oblast. In his teens he worked as a shepherd in his home village. At the age of 18 he enrolled at Rabfak, and later graduated with honors from the Physics and Mathematics Faculty of Saratov State University and started to work there as teacher.

In 1938 he was appointed director of Rostov State University and remained at this post in the most difficult years of the university. In 1939, under the leadership of Professor Mark Vygodsky he defended his thesis on the topic From the History of the Theory of Functions of a Complex Variable. He was one of the first scientists in the Soviet Union to specialize in the field of history of mathematics (which was viewed ambiguously by the Soviet academic circles at that time), and specifically studied the history of the theory of analytic functions. He was the author of a number of scientific works and monographs: The Main Stages in the Development of the General Theory of Analytic Functions (1962), Five Famous Problems of Antiquity (1975), etc.

He laid the foundations of a thorough study of the history of Saratov State University, and was the author of various publications on that topic. For many years he read a special lecture course "History and the Modern Theory of Famous Problems of Antiquity" at Rostov State University.

He died in 1987.
