= Rifat Mustafin =

Russian footballer

Personal information
- Full name: Rifat Rinatovich Mustafin
- Date of birth: 12 August 1983 (age 43)
- Place of birth: Brezhnev, Russian SFSR
- Height: 1.75 m (5 ft 9 in)
- Position: Midfielder

Youth career
- FC KAMAZ Naberezhnye Chelny

Senior career*
Years	Team	Apps	(Gls)
2002	FC Energiya Chaikovsky	28	(1)
2003–2004	FC Saturn Naberezhnye Chelny (amateur)		
2005	FC Saturn Naberezhnye Chelny	34	(2)
2006	FC Neftekhimik Nizhnekamsk	23	(2)
2007–2008	FC Alnas Almetyevsk	47	(5)
2009	FC SOYUZ-Gazprom Izhevsk	29	(2)
2010–2014	FC KAMAZ Naberezhnye Chelny	51	(1)
- * Club domestic league appearances and goals

Rifat Rinatovich Mustafin (Russian: Рифат Ринатович Мустафин; born 12 August 1983) is a former Russian professional football player.

== Club career ==
He played two seasons in the Russian Football National League for FC KAMAZ Naberezhnye Chelny.
