= Kobulov =

Kobulov is a masculine surname, its feminine counterpart is Kobulova. Notable people with the surname include:

- Amayak Kobulov (1906–1955), Soviet politician
- Bogdan Kobulov (1904–1953), Soviet politician, brother of Amayak

== See also ==
- Kabulov
