= Menshikov =

Menshikov may refer to

- Menshikov (surname)
- Menshikov Island in the Sea of Okhotsk
- Menshikov Atoll, a former name of Kwajalein Atoll, part of the Marshall Islands
- Menshikov Palace (Saint Petersburg)
- Menshikov Tower in Moscow, Russia
