= Dabija =

Dabija or Dabizha may refer to:

- Alexandru Dabija (born 1955), Romanian stage director and actor
- Eustratie Dabija, Prince (Voivode) of Moldavia 1661–1665
- Elena Dabija, librarian and activist from Moldova
- George Bengescu-Dabija (1844–1916), Wallachian, later Romanian poet, playwright and army general
- Nicolae Dabija (politician) (1948–2021), writer, literary historian and politician from Moldova
- Nicolae Dabija (soldier) (1907–1949), officer of the Romanian Royal Army and member of the anticommunist armed resistance in Romania
- Nataliya Dabizha (Russian: Наталья Борисовна Дабижа; b. 1948), Russian animator and animation director
