= Vakhvakhishvili =

Georgian noble family

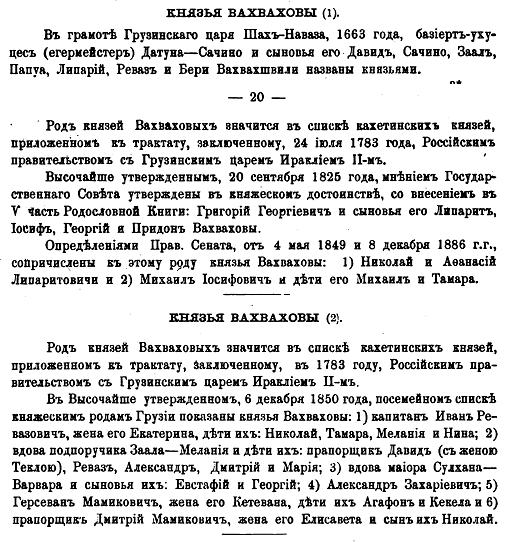
Register of the Princes Vakhvakhov in the Russian nobility book from 1892

The House of Vakhvakhishvili (Georgian: ვახვახიშვილი) is an old Georgian noble family, originally known, since the twelfth century, in the province of Samtskhe whence they later moved to the Kingdom of Kakheti.

== History ==
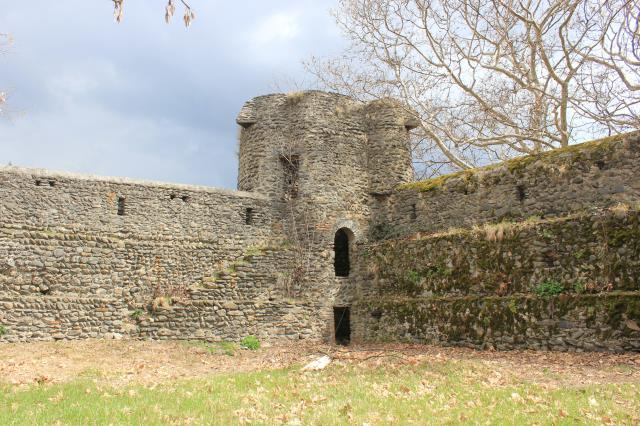
Shilda Fortress of the Vakhvakhishvili family

In the mid-17th century, they acquired the hereditary office of the Grand Master of the Hunt of Kakheti, and were listed among the Kakhetian nobility in a special document attached to the Russo-Georgian Treaty of Georgievsk of 1783. After the annexation of Georgia in 1801 by the Russian Empire, the family was admitted into the Russian nobility and confirmed their princely rank (knyaz Vakhvakhov, Вахваховы) in Russia by the decrees of 1825 and 1850.
