= Nasedkin =

Nasedkin (Russian: Наседкин) is a Russian and Ukrainian masculine surname, its feminine counterpart is Nasedkina. It may refer to

- Aleksey Nasedkin (1942–2014), Russian pianist and composer
- Anatoliy Nasedkin (1924–1994), Soviet-Ukrainian painter
