= Mamatov =

Mamatov (masculine, Russian: Маматов) or Mamatova (feminine, Russian: Маматова) is a Russian and Turkic surname. Notable people with the surname include:

- Bakytbek Mamatov (born 1980), Kyrgyzstani footballer
- Jahangir Mamatov (born 1955), Uzbekistani writer and politician
- Natalya Mamatova (born 1985), Uzbekistani taekwondo practitioner
- Viktor Mamatov (1937–2023), Soviet biathlete
