= Vezirishvili =

Georgian noble family

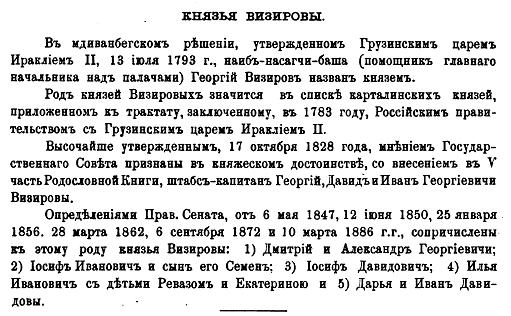
Register of the Princes Vizirov in the Russian nobility book from 1892

The House of Vezirishvili (Georgian: ვეზირიშვილი) was a Georgian noble family, originally from Iran, which was incorporated into the Russian nobility in the 19th century.

== History ==
Its founder accompanied Rostom Khan to Kartli and was confirmed in the princely rank in 1634. In the mid-18th century, the family converted to Georgian Orthodox Christianity. Their estates lay in the province of Shida Kartli. The Princes Vezirishvili were listed among the Georgian nobility in a special document attached to the Russo-Georgian Treaty of Georgievsk of 1783. After the Russian annexion of Georgia in 1801, the family was received into Russian nobility as Knyaz Vizirov (Князья Визировы) in 1828.
