= Saratov State University =

Russian higher education and research institution

Coordinates: 51°32′19.5″N 46°00′28.7″E

- Саратовский государственный университет имени Н. Г. Чернышевского
- Type: Public
- Established: June, 1909
- Rector: Chumachenko Alexey Nikolaevich
- Administrative staff: 1704 (2010)
- Students: 26,342 (2010)
- Postgraduates: 590 (2010)
- Location: Saratov, Russia
- Website: www.sgu.ru/en Building details
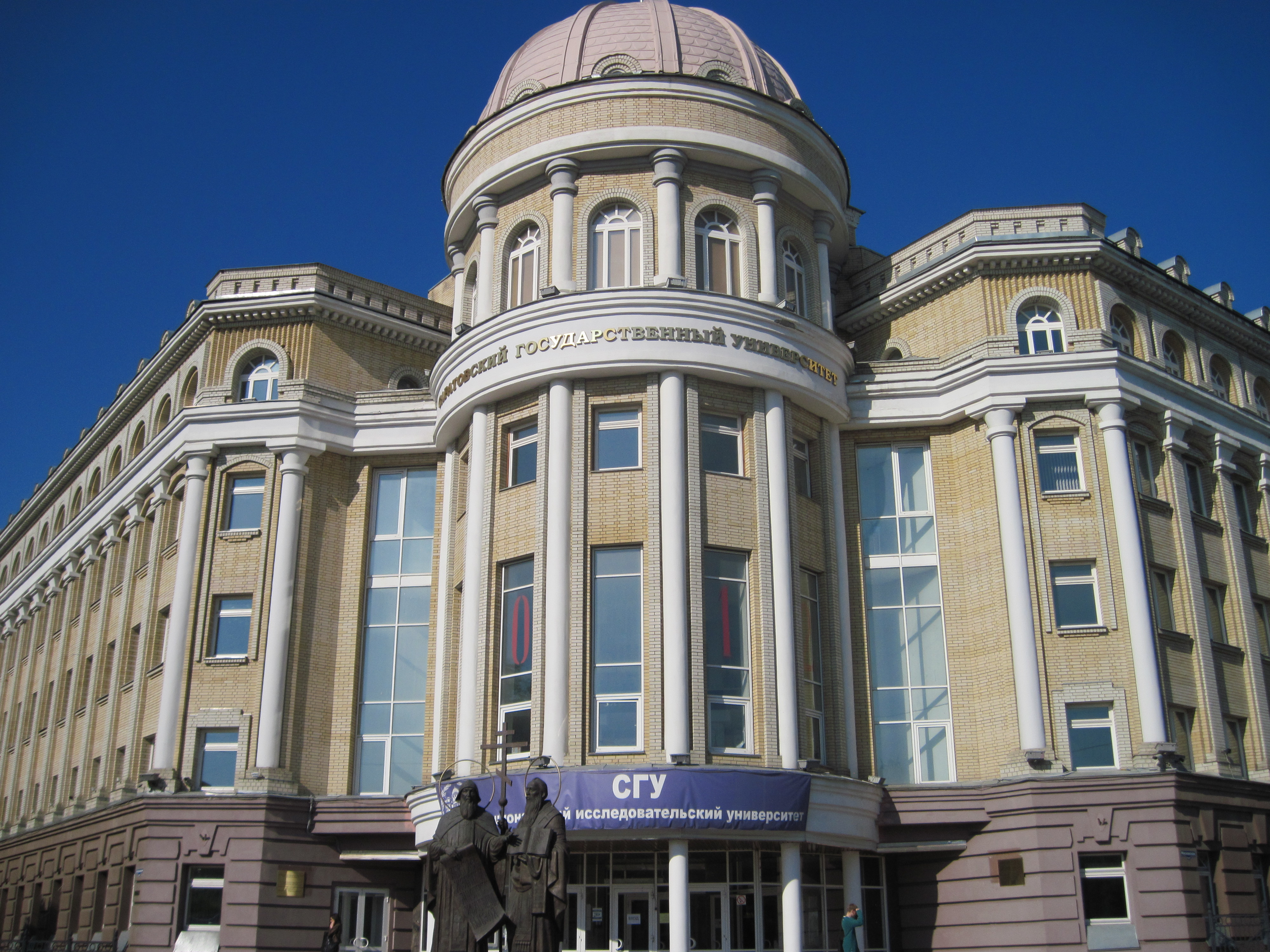

University rankings

Global – Overall
- USNWR Global: 1,156 (2023)

Regional – Overall
- QS Emerging Europe and Central Asia: 152 (2022)

Saratov Chernyshevsky State University (Russian: Саратовский государственный университет имени Н. Г. Чернышевского, СГУ, transcribed as SGU) is a higher education and research institution in Russia. In 2023 it was ranked #1,156 in the world by US News & World Report.

Named for Nikolay Chernyshevsky, the university was founded in 1909 under the name Imperial Saratov University by the Decree of Emperor Nicholas II. On June 10, 1909, the Emperor signed the "Decree on the foundation of the university in Saratov", which became the tenth University in Russia and consisted of the Medical Faculty only. Professor V.I. Razumovsky became the first university rector. He was a public figure, surgeon, and scientist. Construction of university buildings as well as the university clinic named after S.R. Mirotvortsev was carried out under the supervision of Russian architect Karl Hermann Ludwig Müffke. The Regional Institute for Microbiology and Epidemiology in South East Russia opened in the city in 1919.

It is located in Saratov, a city in the southeast of the European part of Russia, on the right bank of the Volga River. SGU has 28 departments, more than 90 programmes of study are offered and the enrollment is around 28,000 students. In April 2006 the programming team from Saratov State University won the world finals of the 2006 ACM International Collegiate Programming Contest held in San Antonio, Texas.

== Notable people ==
- Faizo Shamoyan
- Nikolai Vavilov
- Semyon Belozyorov
- Boris Gnedenko
- Serafima Gromova
- Isaac Mustafin
- Artem Stolyarov
- Kirill V. Larin

== See also ==
- List of modern universities in Europe (1801–1945)
