= Elastography =

Set of imaging methods for determining soft-tissue hardness

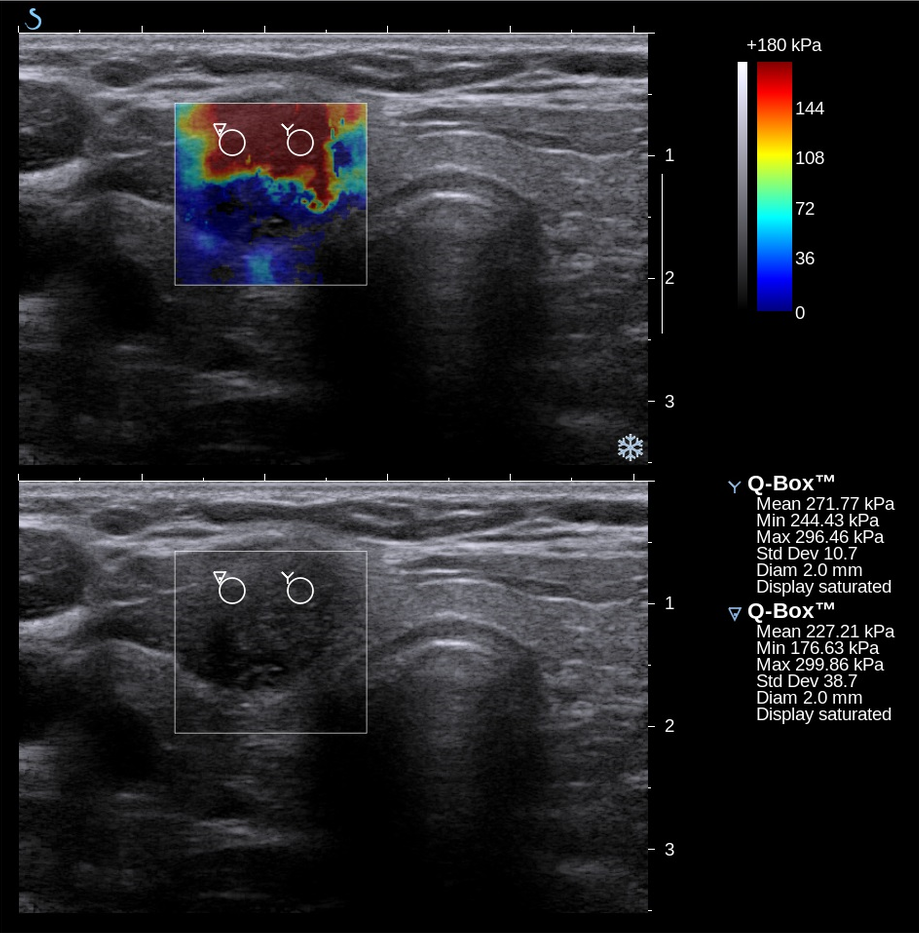
- Conventional ultrasonography (lower image) and elastography (supersonic shear imaging; upper image) of papillary thyroid carcinoma, a malignant cancer. The cancer (red) is much stiffer than the healthy tissue.
- MeSH: D054459

Elastography is any of a class of medical imaging diagnostic methods that map the elastic properties and stiffness of soft tissue. The main idea is that whether the tissue is hard or soft will give diagnostic information about the presence or status of disease. For example, cancerous tumours will often be harder than the surrounding tissue, and diseased livers are stiffer than healthy ones.

The most prominent techniques use ultrasound or magnetic resonance imaging (MRI) to make both the stiffness map and an anatomical image for comparison.

== Historical background ==
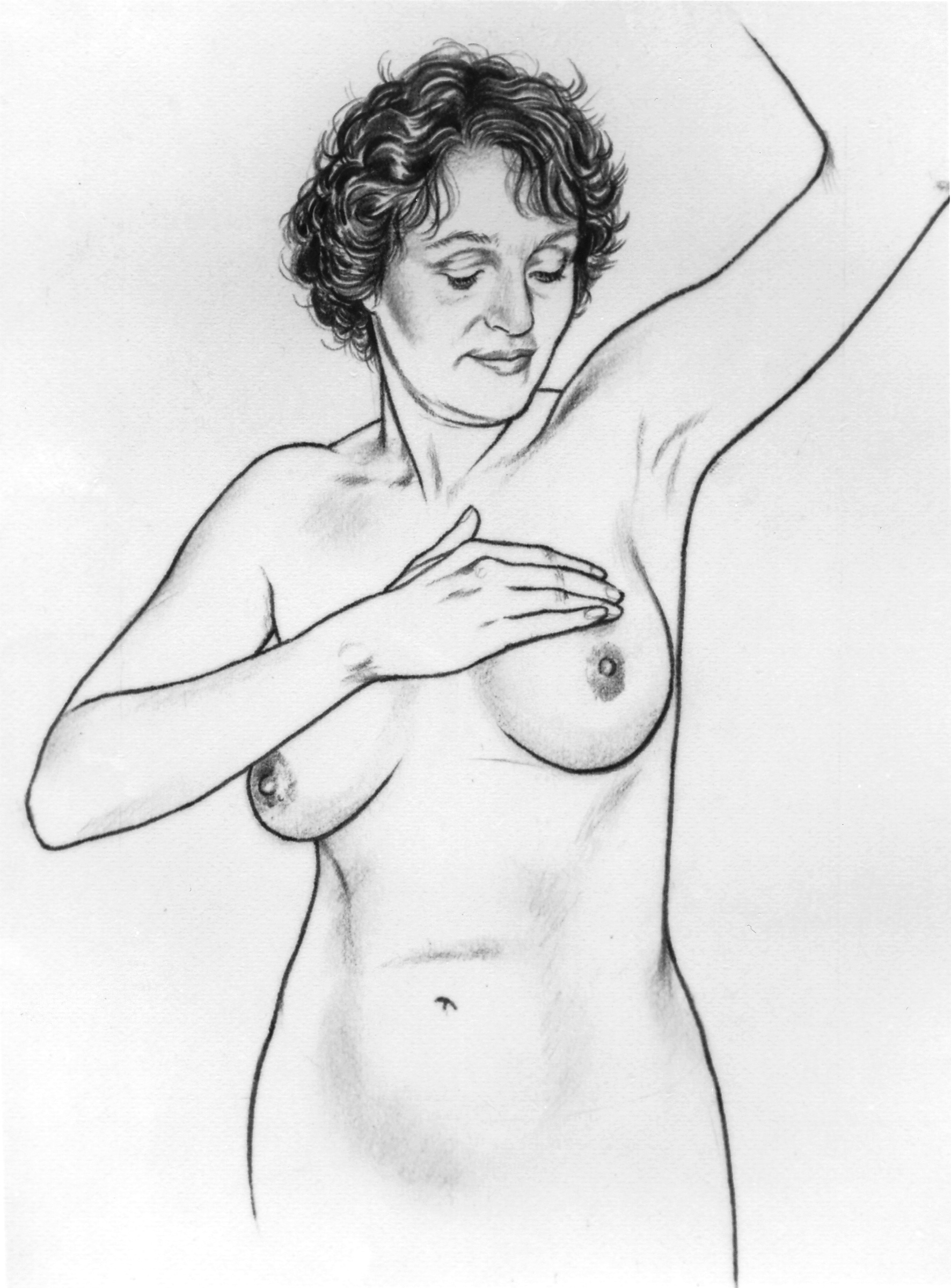
Palpation has long been used to detect disease. In a breast self-examination, women look for hard lumps, as cancer is usually stiffer than healthy tissue.

Palpation is the practice of feeling the stiffness of a person's or animal's tissues with the health practitioner's hands. Manual palpation dates back at least to 1500 BC, with the Egyptian Ebers Papyrus and Edwin Smith Papyrus both giving instructions on diagnosis with palpation. In ancient Greece, Hippocrates gave instructions on many forms of diagnosis using palpation, including palpation of the breasts, wounds, bowels, ulcers, uterus, skin, and tumours. In the modern Western world, palpation became considered a respectable method of diagnosis in the 1930s. Since then, the practice of palpation has become widespread, and it is considered an effective method of detecting tumours and other pathologies.

Manual palpation has several important limitations: it is limited to tissues accessible to the physician's hand, it is distorted by any intervening tissue, and it is qualitative but not quantitative. Elastography, the measurement of tissue stiffness, seeks to address these challenges.

== How it works ==
There are numerous elastographic techniques, in development stages from early research to extensive clinical application. Each of these techniques works in a different way. What all methods have in common is that they create a distortion in the tissue, observe and process the tissue response to infer the mechanical properties of the tissue, and then display the results to the operator, usually as an image. Each elastographic method is characterized by the way it does each of these things.

=== Inducing a distortion ===
To image the mechanical properties of tissue, we need to see how it behaves when deformed. There are three main ways of inducing a distortion to observe. These are:

- Pushing/deforming or vibrating the surface of the body (skin) or organ (prostate) with a probe or a tool,
- Using acoustic radiation force impulse imaging using ultrasound to remotely create a 'push' inside the tissue, and
- Using distortions created by normal physiological processes, e.g. pulse or heartbeat.

=== Observing the response ===
The primary way elastographic techniques are categorized is by what imaging modality (type) they use to observe the response. Elastographic techniques use ultrasound, magnetic resonance imaging (MRI) and pressure/stress sensors in tactile imaging (TI) using tactile sensor(s). There are a handful of other methods that exist as well.

The observation of the tissue response can take many forms. In terms of the image obtained, it can be 1-D (i.e. a line), 2-D (a plane), 3-D (a volume), or 0-D (a single value), and it can be a video or a single image. In most cases, the result is displayed to the operator along with a conventional image of the tissue, which shows where in the tissue the different stiffness values occur.

=== Processing and presentation ===
Once the response has been observed, the stiffness can be calculated from it. Most elastography techniques find the stiffness of tissue based on one of two main principles:

- For a given applied force (stress), stiffer tissue deforms (strains) less than does softer tissue.
- Mechanical waves (specifically shear waves) travel faster through stiffer tissue than through softer tissue.

Some techniques will simply display the distortion and/or response, or the wave speed to the operator, while others will compute the stiffness (specifically the Young's modulus or similar shear modulus) and display that instead. Some techniques present results quantitatively, while others only present qualitative (relative) results.

== Ultrasound elastography ==
There are a great many ultrasound elastographic techniques. The most prominent are highlighted below.

=== Quasistatic elastography / strain imaging ===
Manual compression (quasistatic) elastography of invasive ductal carcinoma, a breast cancer.

Quasistatic elastography (sometimes called simply 'elastography' for historical reasons) is one of the earliest elastography techniques. In this technique, an external compression is applied to tissue, and the ultrasound images before and after the compression are compared. The areas of the image that are least deformed are the ones that are the stiffest, while the most deformed areas are the least stiff. Generally, what is displayed to the operator is an image of the relative distortions (strains), which is often of clinical utility.

From the relative distortion image, however, making a quantitative stiffness map is often desired. To do this requires that assumptions be made about the nature of the soft tissue being imaged and about tissue outside of the image. Additionally, under compression, objects can move into or out of the image or around in the image, causing problems with interpretation. Another limit of this technique is that like manual palpation, it has difficulty with organs or tissues that are not close to the surface or easily compressed.

=== Acoustic radiation force impulse imaging (ARFI) ===
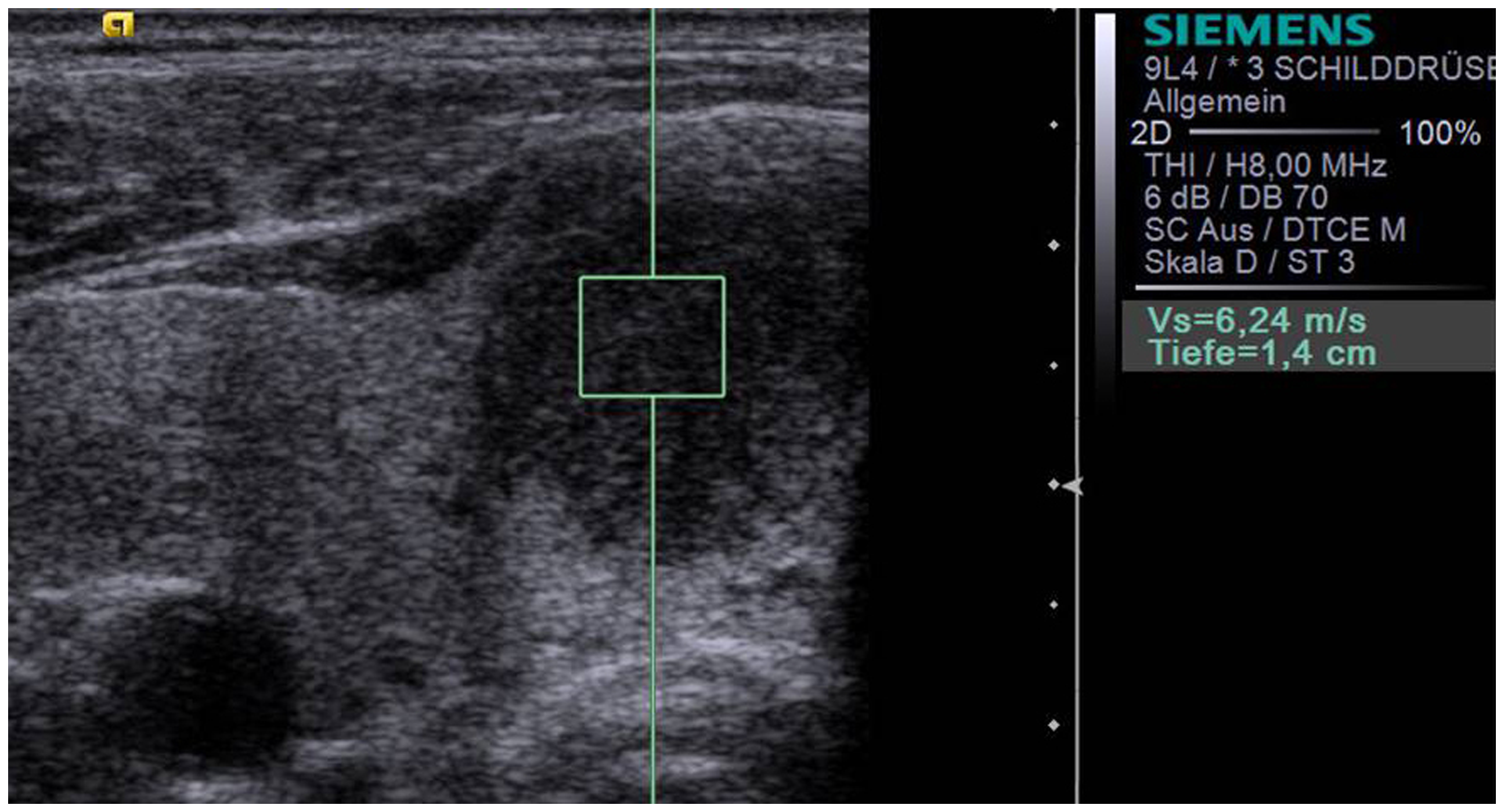
An ARFI image of a thyroid nodule in the right thyroid lobe. The shear wave speed inside the box is 6.24 m/s, which is reflective of a high stiffness. Histology revealed papillary carcinoma.

Acoustic radiation force impulse imaging (ARFI) uses ultrasound to create a qualitative 2-D map of tissue stiffness. It does so by creating a 'push' inside the tissue using the acoustic radiation force from a focused ultrasound beam. The amount the tissue along the axis of the beam is pushed down is reflective of tissue stiffness; softer tissue is more easily pushed than stiffer tissue. ARFI shows a qualitative stiffness value along the axis of the pushing beam. By pushing in many different places, a map of the tissue stiffness is built up. Virtual Touch imaging quantification (VTIQ) has been successfully used to identify malignant cervical lymph nodes.

=== Shear-wave elasticity imaging (SWEI) ===
In shear-wave elasticity imaging (SWEI), similar to ARFI, a 'push' is induced deep in the tissue by acoustic radiation force. The disturbance created by this push travels sideways through the tissue as a shear wave. By using an image modality like ultrasound or MRI to see how fast the wave gets to different lateral positions, the stiffness of the intervening tissue is inferred. Since the terms "elasticity imaging" and "elastography" are synonyms, the original term SWEI denoting the technology for elasticity mapping using shear waves is often replaced by SWE. The principal difference between SWEI and ARFI is that SWEI is based on the use of shear waves propagating laterally from the beam axis and creating elasticity map by measuring shear wave propagation parameters whereas ARFI gets elasticity information from the axis of the pushing beam and uses multiple pushes to create a 2-D stiffness map. No shear waves are involved in ARFI and no axial elasticity assessment is involved in SWEI. SWEI is implemented in supersonic shear imaging (SSI).

=== Supersonic shear imaging (SSI) ===
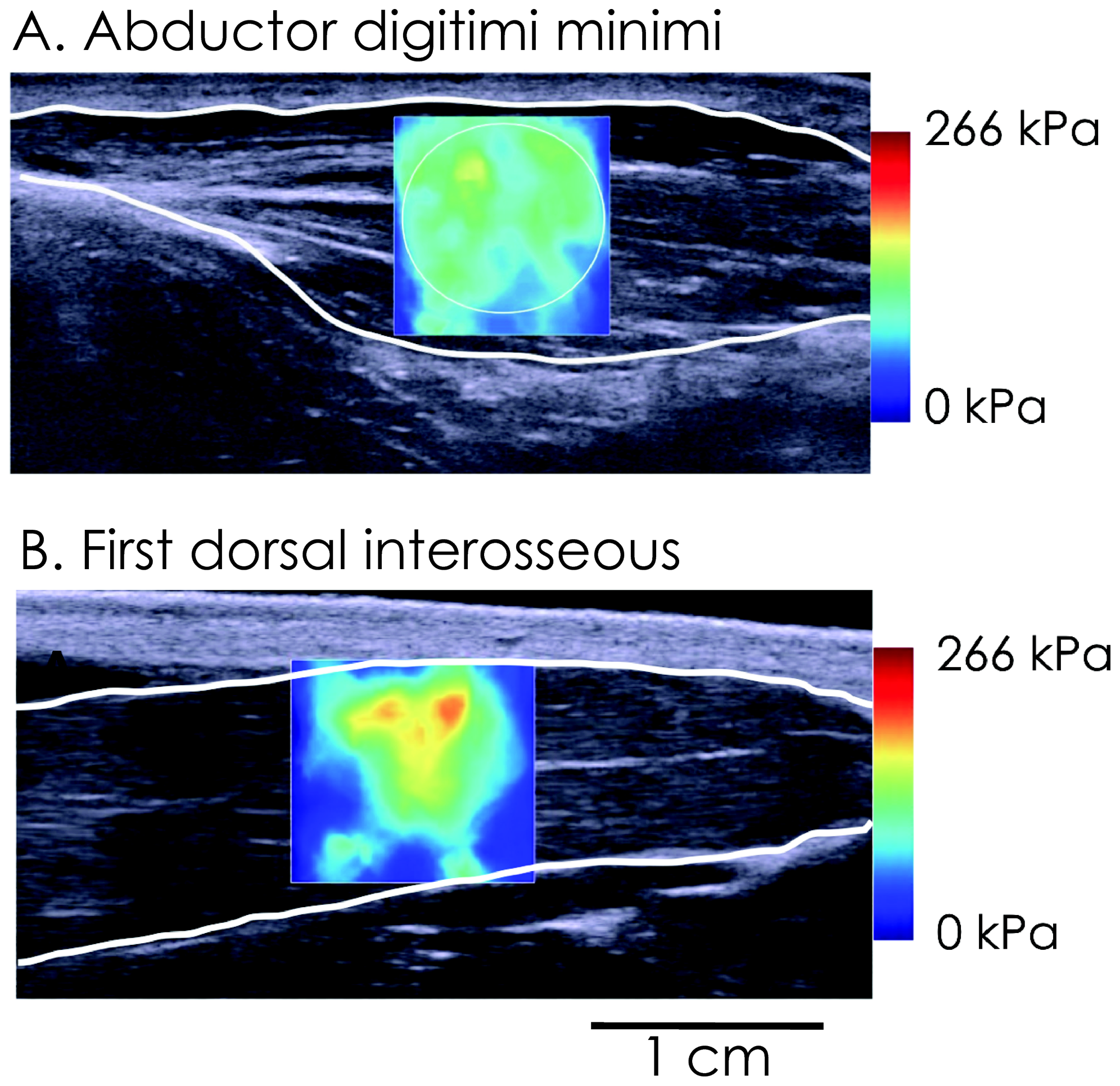
Supersonic shear imaging of the stiffness during contraction of the hand muscles abductor digiti minimi (A) and first dorsal interosseous (B). The scale is in kPa of shear modulus.

Supersonic shear imaging (SSI) gives a quantitative, real-time two-dimensional map of tissue stiffness. SSI is based on SWEI: it uses acoustic radiation force to induce a 'push' inside the tissue of interest generating shear waves and the tissue's stiffness is computed from how fast the resulting shear wave travels through the tissue. Local tissue velocity maps are obtained with a conventional speckle tracking technique and provide a full movie of the shear wave propagation through the tissue. There are two principal innovations implemented in SSI. First, by using many near-simultaneous pushes, SSI creates a source of shear waves which is moved through the medium at a supersonic speed. Second, the generated shear wave is visualized by using ultrafast imaging technique. Using inversion algorithms, the shear elasticity of medium is mapped quantitatively from the wave propagation movie. SSI is the first ultrasonic imaging technology able to reach more than 10,000 frames per second of deep-seated organs. SSI provides a set of quantitative and in vivo parameters describing the tissue mechanical properties: Young's modulus, viscosity, anisotropy.

This approach demonstrated clinical benefit in breast, thyroid, liver, prostate, and musculoskeletal imaging. SSI is used for breast examination with a number of high-resolution linear transducers. A large multi-center breast imaging study has demonstrated both reproducibility and significant improvement in the classification of breast lesions when shear wave elastography images are added to the interpretation of standard B-mode and Color mode ultrasound images.

=== Transient elastography ===
In the food industry, low-intensity ultrasonics has already been used since the 1980s to provide information about the concentration, structure, and physical state of components in foods such as vegetables, meats, and dairy products and also for quality control, for example to evaluate the rheological qualities of cheese.

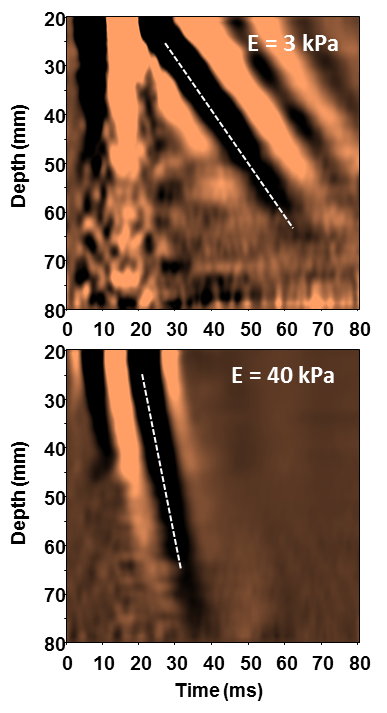
Shear wave propagation maps obtained using transient elastography VCTE technique in a normal liver (top) and a cirrhotic liver (bottom). The liver stiffness is significantly higher in the cirrhotic liver.

Transient elastography was initially called time-resolved pulse elastography when it was introduced in the late 1990s. The technique relies on a transient mechanical vibration which is used to induce a shear wave into the tissue. The propagation of the shear wave is tracked using ultrasound in order to assess the shear wave speed from which the Young's modulus is deduced under hypothesis of homogeneity, isotropy and pure elasticity (E=3ρV²). An important advantage of transient elastography compared to harmonic elastography techniques is the separation of shear waves and compression waves. The technique can be implemented in 1D and 2D which required the development of an ultrafast ultrasound scanner.

Transient elastography gives a quantitative one-dimensional (i.e. a line) image of "tissue" stiffness. It functions by vibrating the skin with a motor to create a passing distortion in the tissue (a shear wave), and imaging the motion of that distortion as it passes deeper into the body using a 1D ultrasound beam. It then displays a quantitative line of tissue stiffness data (the Young's modulus). This technique is used mainly by the FibroScan system, which is used for liver assessment, for example, to diagnose cirrhosis. A specific implementation of 1D transient elastography called VCTE has been developed to assess average liver stiffness which correlates to liver fibrosis assessed by liver biopsy. This technique is implemented in a device which can also assess the controlled attenuation parameter (CAP) which is good surrogate marker of liver steatosis.

== Magnetic resonance elastography (MRE) ==
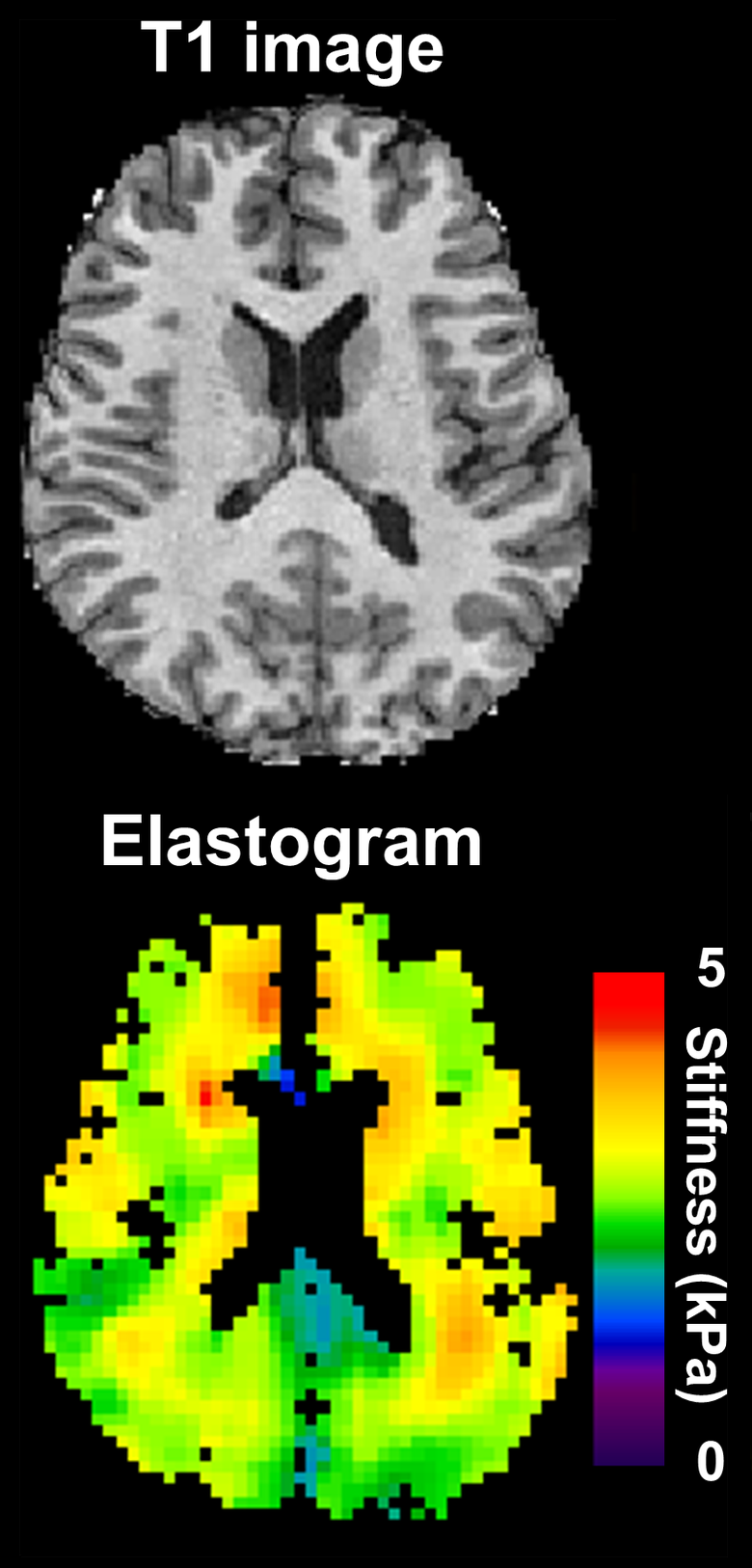
An anatomical MRI image of a brain (top) and an MRE elastogram of the same brain (bottom). The stiffness is in kPa of shear modulus.

Magnetic resonance elastography (MRE) was introduced in the mid-1990s, and multiple clinical applications have been investigated. In MRE, a mechanical vibrator is used on the surface of the patient's body; this creates shear waves that travel into the patient's deeper tissues. An imaging acquisition sequence that measures the velocity of the waves is used, and this is used to infer the tissue's stiffness (the shear modulus). The result of an MRE scan is a quantitative 3-D map of the tissue stiffness, as well as a conventional 3-D MRI image.

One strength of MRE is the resulting 3-D elasticity map, which can cover an entire organ. Because MRI is not limited by air or bone, it can access some tissues ultrasound cannot, notably the brain. It also has the advantage of being more uniform across operators and less dependent on operator skill than most methods of ultrasound elastography.

MR elastography has made significant advances over the past few years with acquisition times down to a minute or less and has been used in a variety of medical applications including cardiology research on living human hearts. MR elastography's short acquisition time also makes it competitive with other elastography techniques.

== Optical elastography ==
Optical elastography is an emerging technique that utilizes optical microscopy to obtain tissue images. The most common form of optical elastography, optical coherence elastography (OCE), is based on optical coherence tomography (OCT), which combines interferometry with lateral beam scanning for rapid 3D image acquisition and achieves spatial resolutions of 5-15 μm. For OCE, a mechanical load is applied to the tissue and the resultant deformation is measured using speckle tracking or phase sensitive detection. Early implementations of OCE involved applying a quasi-static compression to the tissue, though more recently dynamic loading has been achieved through the application of a sinusoidal modulation via a contact transducer or acoustic wave. Other imaging modalities with greater optical resolution have also been introduced for optical elastography to probe the microscale between cells and whole tissues. OCT relies on longer wavelengths, of 850 - 1050 nm, and therefore provides a lower optical resolution compared to common light microscopy, which uses visible wavelengths of 400-700 nm, and provides lateral spatial resolutions of <1 μm. Examples of higher resolution analysis include the use of confocal and light-sheet microscopy respectively for mechanical characterization of multicellular spheroids and for structural analysis of 3D organoids at a single-cell resolution. When using these imaging modalities, quasi-static compression may be induced in the tissue sample by a micro-indentation device, such as a microtweezer. The resultant deformation can be measured from the microscopy images using image-based nodal tracking algorithms, and mechanical properties can be discerned using finite element method (FEM) analyses.

== Applications ==
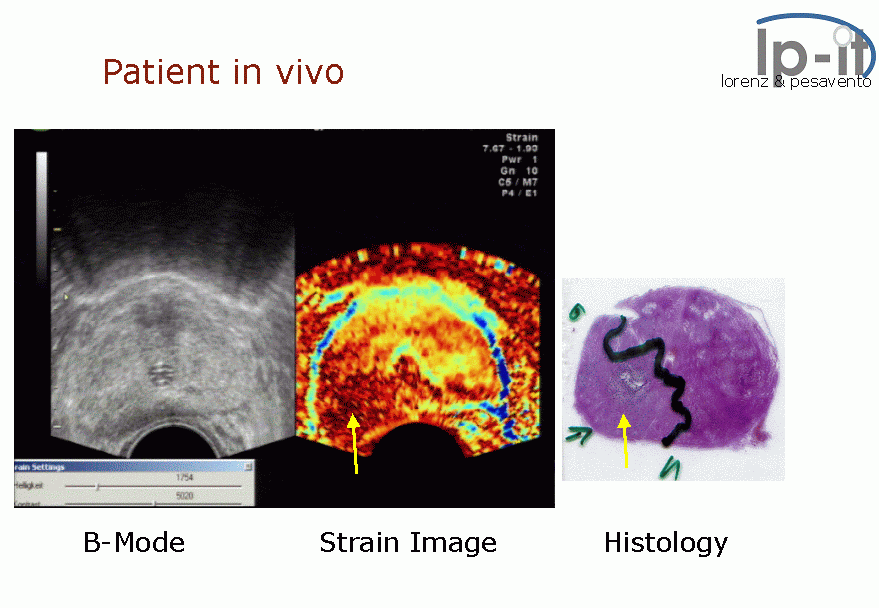
While not visible on conventional grayscale ultrasound (left), a strain elastography image (centre) of the prostate gland detects a cancer (dark red area at lower left). The finding is confirmed by histology.

Elastography is used for the investigation of many disease conditions in many organs. It can be used for additional diagnostic information compared to a mere anatomical image, and it can be used to guide biopsies or, increasingly, replace them entirely. Biopsies are invasive and painful, presenting a risk of hemorrhage or infection, whereas elastography is completely noninvasive.

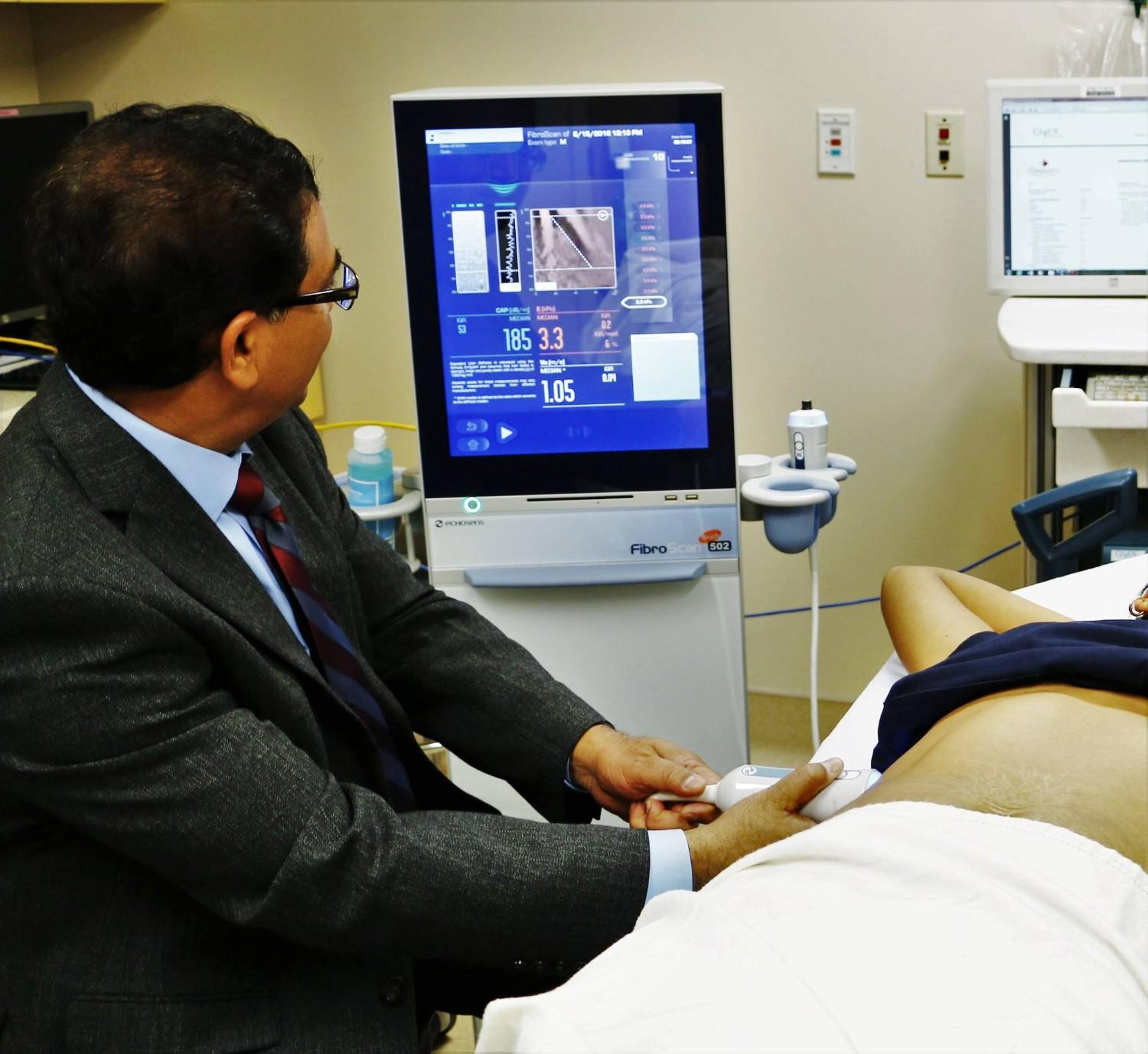
A Transient Elastography (FibroScan) readout showing Liver Stiffness Measurement (LSM) to assess fibrosis and Controlled Attenuation Parameter (CAP) to quantify hepatic steatosis (fatty liver).

Elastography is used to investigate disease in the liver. Liver stiffness is usually indicative of fibrosis or steatosis (fatty liver disease), which are in turn indicative of numerous disease conditions, including cirrhosis and hepatitis. Elastography is particularly advantageous in this case because when fibrosis is diffuse (spread around in clumps rather than continuous scarring), a biopsy can easily miss sampling the diseased tissue, which results in a false negative misdiagnosis.

Naturally, elastography sees use for organs and diseases where manual palpation was already widespread. Elastography is used for detection and diagnosis of breast, thyroid, and prostate cancers. Certain types of elastography are also suitable for musculoskeletal imaging, and they can determine the mechanical properties and state of muscles and tendons. Because elastography does not have the same limitations as manual palpation, it is being investigated in some areas for which there is no history of diagnosis with manual palpation. For example, magnetic resonance elastography is capable of assessing the stiffness of the brain, and there is a growing body of scientific literature on elastography in healthy and diseased brains.

In 2015, preliminary reports on elastography used on transplanted kidneys to evaluate cortical fibrosis have been published showing promising results. In Bristol University's study Children of the 90s, 2.5% of 4,000 people born in 1991 and 1992 were found by ultrasound scanning at the age of 18 to have non-alcoholic fatty liver disease; five years later transient elastography found over 20% to have the fatty deposits on the liver of steatosis, indicating non-alcoholic fatty liver disease; half of those were classified as severe. The scans also found that 2.4% had the liver scarring of fibrosis, which can lead to cirrhosis.

Other techniques include elastography with optical coherence tomography (i.e. light).

Tactile imaging involves translating the results of a digital "touch" into an image. Many physical principles have been explored for the realization of tactile sensors: resistive, inductive, capacitive, optoelectric, magnetic, piezoelectric, and electroacoustic principles, in a variety of configurations.

== Notes ==
† In the case of endogenous motion imaging, instead of inducing a disturbance, disturbances naturally created by physiological processes are observed.
