= Mikhail Mustafin =

Russian footballer

Personal information
- Full name: Mikhail Fyodorovich Mustafin
- Date of birth: 11 July 1983 (age 43)
- Height: 1.72 m (5 ft 7 1/2 in)
- Position: Midfielder

Youth career
- FC Volga Ulyanovsk

Senior career*
Years	Team	Apps	(Gls)
2001–2003	FC Volga Ulyanovsk	15	(2)
2004	FC Stroyplastmass Podomasovo		
2005	FC Lada-SOK Dimitrovgrad	29	(2)
2007–2012	FC Volga Ulyanovsk	146	(5)
- * Club domestic league appearances and goals

Mikhail Fyodorovich Mustafin (Russian: Михаил Фёдорович Мустафин; born 11 July 1983) is a Russian former professional football player.

== Club career ==
He played in the Russian Football National League for FC Volga Ulyanovsk in 2008.
