= Makashvili =

Makashvili (Georgian: მაყაშვილი) is a Georgian surname that may refer to the following notable people:

- Abel Makashvili (1860–1920), Georgian prince and soldier
- Levan Makashvili (born 1989), Georgian-American mixed martial artist
- Maro Makashvili (1901–1921), Georgian nurse
