= Mikadze =

Mikadze მიქაძე
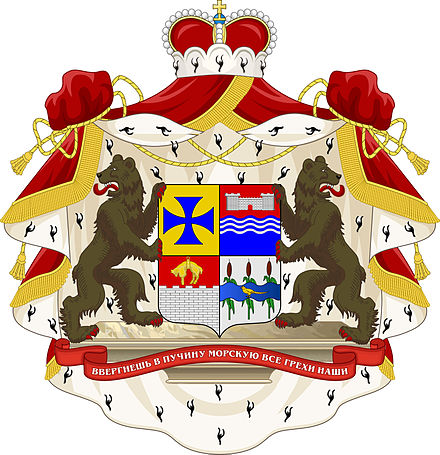
- Description: The shield is divided into four parts. In the first part, which is golden, there is a blue pattee cross. In the second part, intersected wavyly with red and blue, there is a silver masoned fortress with two towers, with open gates at the top, and three heightened narrow wavy silver belts at the bottom. In the third part, which is red, there is a silver crenelated wall with a golden fleece above it. In the fourth part, which is silver, there is a blue wavy belt over three natural reeds, burdened with a golden walking pheasant. The supporters of the shield are two black bears turned backward, with red claws and tongues. The motto is written in silver letters on a red ribbon. The coat of arms is adorned with a crimson mantle lined with ermine, with golden cords, tassels, and fringe, and is topped with a princely crown.
- Country: Georgia
- Current region: Samegrelo-Zemo Svaneti
- Founded: 16th century
- Founder: Prince (Georgian: ერისთავი) Zviad Mikadze
- Historic seat: Principality of Mingrelia; Russian Empire
- Titles: Tavadi; Eristavi; Mouravi
- Motto: Ввергнешь в пучину морскую все грехи наши (Cast all our sins into the sea abyss)
- Estates: Poti; Anaklia; Chaladidi; Nokalakevi; Zanati; Samikao

The House of Mikadze (Georgian: მიქაძე, მიქაძეები) is a family name belonging to the group of Georgian noble (princely) families from the former Principality of Mingrelia.

According to the information provided by the historian Abesalom Tugushi, the Mikadze family is one of the oldest noble families in Mingrelia, with the first mention dating back to the 13th-14th centuries. An inscription on the bell tower of the Church of St. John the Baptist in the village of Eki mentions Georgy Mikadze, whose "efforts" led to the construction of the bell tower. Academician Ekvtime Takaishvili, in his work "Archaeological Journeys and Notes," describes a small church dedicated to Archangel Michael in the village of Mukheli, located in the Lengeri district of Svaneti, and provides an inscription below a fresco depicting "Michael's child Eristavi Zviad and his wife Natela" ("მიქას ძე ერისთავი ზვიადი... ნათელ მეუღლე") dressed in Georgian attire and holding a church plan. Takaisvili did not provide a specific date for the inscription, but judging by the attire and headdress of Eristavi Zviad Mikadze, it can be assumed that the fresco and inscription date back to the 14th century.

== The noble rank ==
The noble Mikadze family belongs to the category of Tavadi (თავადი), a princely rank in Georgia. It hereditarily held the positions of Tavadi of Poti and Anaklia, Mouravi of Chaladidi and Nokalakevi, as well as Mdivanbeg of Chaladidi. The family is mentioned with these titles and positions during the reign of Levan V Dadiani. When describing the Church of St. George in the village of Gamochinebuli in Guria, Dmitry Bakradze reports that "the cross, which also contains inscriptions, is made of silver with gilding and precious stones and is one of those that were usually worn by the clergy." Among other inscriptions, it bears the following: "May God forgive the sins of Afrosiob Mikadze. Whoever asks for his forgiveness, may God have mercy on them." Bakradze believes that Afrosiob Mikadze was a figure of the first half of the 16th century since other inscriptions on the same cross, dated to the same period as the inscription of Afrosiob, mention the ruler of Guria, Mamia I Gurieli (died in 1534), the abbot of the Lazarus Monastery, and influential princes of that time, Javakh and Shedan Chiladze.

== The first historical mentions ==
The Mikadze Princes were first mentioned in written sources back in the year 1582. A letter addressed to the ruler of Mingrelia (presumably Georgi III Dadiani) mentions "the great prince of Poti and Anaklia, Mouravi of Chaladidi and Nokalakhevi, Bejan Mikadze," along with his brothers Beka, Katsia, and Petre. According to the letter, Prince Beka Mikadze, the eldest brother of Bejan, was "captured by the Bichvinta Tatars, converted to the Muslim faith, and made into a pasha."

== Prince Petre Mikadze ==
Prince Petre Mikadze, the younger brother of Bejan, was sent to accompany one of the Georgian kings (presumably Simon I) to Kartli and became the progenitor of the Kartli branch of the family. His descendants served in the clergy and held hereditary positions as archpriests of the Tbilisi Sioni Cathedral from the late 16th century to the mid-19th century. Among the descendants of Petre Mikadze were Metropolitan Euthymius Tbileli (died 1740) and Ambrosius Nekreseli (ამბროსი ნეკრესელი, 1728-1812), as well as the Georgian writer and statesman Iessei Osesdze/Mikadze, better known as Iessei Baratashvili. Notable descendants of Iessei Baratashvili include Prince Joseph Baratov (1872-1937), a lawyer, sworn advocate, and deputy of the State Duma of the 1st convocation representing Tiflis Governorate, and Prince Nikolai Baratov (1865-1932), a Russian cavalry general.

== Prince Bejan Mikadze ==
The descendants of Prince Bejan Mikadze, Prince Sekhnia Mikadze, and his eldest son Bejan, on December 2, 1803, affixed their signatures to the "Petition Points and Sworn Promise of the Mingrelian Prince Dadiani upon entering into the allegiance to Russia." The oath was taken in the fortress of Chaladidi. Based on this document, the descendants of Prince Sekhnia Mikadze (his sons from his first marriage - Bejan, Georgi, Grigori, and Dmitry - and his sons from his second marriage to Princess Daredjan Nakashidze - Konstantin and Manuchar) were recognized with princely status by the Russian Empire in 1867 after the final abolition of the autonomy of the Principality of Mingrelia.

== Buchua Mikadze ==
The descendants of Buchua Mikadze were also recognized in the noble rank of the Russian Empire based in the village of Samikao.

== Estates ==
The Mikadze princes owned the fortresses of Poti, Anaklia, and Chaladidi, as well as extensive estates in the vicinity of Nokalakevi. Their hereditary possessions included the following villages: Chaladidi (partially, an extensive estate consisting of Upper (ზემო) and Lower (ქვემო) Chaladidi, which included the villages of Sagvichio, Sakorkio, Siriachkoni, Chaladidis-Mukhuri, Mikadze, Sachochuo, Sachachavo, Patarapoti, and others), Nokalakevi (partially), Zanati (partially), and Samikao. The possessions began at the border of Mingrelia and Imereti, with the river Tskhenistskali forming the eastern boundary, and extended from east to west all the way to the sea on both sides of the river Rioni.

== Sources ==
- AVPR, f. SPb. Main Archive, 1-7, op. 6, 1803, d. 5, sheets 17-27 (original in Georgian and Russian languages). Published in: Dubrovin N. F. Transcaucasia from 1803-1806.—St. Petersburg, 1866.—pp. 513–516. April 25, 1804.
- Acts collected by the Caucasian Archaeographic Commission, volume II, p. 507.
- Annotated Dictionary of Personal Names from Georgian Historical Documents of the 11th-17th centuries (in Georgian), Tbilisi "Metsniereba", 1991, Volume I, p. 179.
- Annotated Dictionary of Personal Names from Georgian Historical Documents of the 11th-17th centuries (in Georgian), Tbilisi "Artanudzhi", 2004, Volume III, p. 192.
- Bakradze D.Z. "Archaeological Journey through Guria and Adchara", St. Petersburg, 1878, pp. 235–236.
- Borozdin K. A. "Memories of the Transcaucasus", St. Petersburg, 1885.
- Geological map by Simonovich S. and Sorokin A., Tiflis, 1887.
- Georgian Prose, Book V (in Georgian), Tbilisi, "Sabchota Sakartvelo", 1983, pp. 562–698.
- Georgian State Historical Archive, Fund 213, case No. 941.
- Nobility Families of the Russian Empire, volume IV, Moscow, LIKOMINVEST, 1998, pp. 177–180.
- Ioseliani Avtandil, "Questions of Georgian Writing, Books, and Typography" (in Georgian), Tbilisi, "Metsniereba", 1990, pp. 195–204.
- Kutaisi Central Historical Archive, Fund 1, Cases on Recognition of Princely Rank: No. 4457, No. 5336, No. 5453, No. 5529, No. 5684, No. 6116, No. 6208.
- Kutaisi Central Historical Archive, Fund 8, Charter Letters: inventory 1, case 813, sheets: 9-13, 42-45, 74-75.
- "General Armorial of Noble Families of the Russian Empire, started in 1797", "Part Twenty-Three 1932-2007". Heraldry at the Office of the Head of the Russian Imperial House, Moscow, 2018, S.V. Dumin, 2018.
- Orthodox Encyclopedia.
- Takaishvili E., "Archaeological Journeys and Notes" (in two volumes), Tbilisi, 1907, in Georgian; Reprinted in the book Takaishvili E. "Return", "Works in Emigration" (in two volumes), in Georgian, Tbilisi, 1991, p. 259.
- Tugushi A., journal "Friend of Monuments" No. 3, 1988, in Georgian, pp. 57–58.
