= Elena Dabija =

Moldovan librarian and activist

- Education: Moldova State University
- Occupation: Librarian
- Known for: Head International Academic Center "Mihai Eminescu"
- Awards: Order of the Star of Romania

Elena Dabija is a librarian and activist from Moldova. She is the director of the International Academic Center "Mihai Eminescu" in Chişinău. Dabija was awarded, by a presidential decree, with Romania's highest state decoration – the Order of the Star of Romania.
