= Isaac Mustafin =

Isaac Mustafin (Russian: Исаак Савельевич Мустафин) (1908–1968) was a Soviet chemist and a doctor of chemical sciences. Dr. Mustafin headed the faculty of analytical chemistry at Saratov State University from 1955.

All his life was connected to the Saratov State University: his only lengthy absence from his work place took place from June 23, 1941 to August 15, 1945, when he served in the army. The life and activity of Professor Mustafin were reflected in a number of papers [1–7] and even monographs [8–9], including that in the series of scientific biographic literature of the Nauka publishing house [8]. (See also [10]). The unusual biography and diversified interests of the scientist have attracted the attention of chemists, historians, philosophers, and writers. In fact, a characteristic feature of I.S. Mustafin was the broad spectrum of his scientific interests: he successfully worked in analytical, organic, physical, and inorganic chemistry; bio- and geochemistry; and the philosophy and history of science. In all these directions, he was interested in the key problems: in organic chemistry, the synthesis of new and the most important compounds; in bio- and geochemistry, the origin of fuel materials, coal and oil; and in analytical chemistry, the search for lows in the application of analytical reagents, the construction of a system for assessing the sensitivity and selectivity of analytical reactions, and the development of the theory of action of organic reagents in chemical analysis.

The first of Mustafin’s scientific works, which were devoted to mellitic acid, were highly appreciated by the Russian chemistry Academician Nikolay Zelinsky and recommended for publication in the journal Doklady Akademii Nauk. Mellitic acid was studied by Mustafin for determining the structure of caustobioliths from different deposits. It, in turn, allowed him to solve two problems, the first, about the paths of the natural formation of caustobioliths from the products of the postmortem transformations of plant tissues; and the second, about the possibility of the synthesis of valuable oxygen-containing organic compounds from black or brown coal by their oxidative decomposition.

To fulfill this task, Mustafin had to use methods of qualitative and quantitative determination of mellitic acid that had still not been described. To create such methods, the scientist synthesized the total mellitic acid anhydride, which was found to form orange-red crystals with naphthalene, dark blue with anthracene, brown-red with phenanthrene, and light brown with veratrole. The scientist isolated the crystals of all these compounds and found that, in all cases, the molecular relation of their components was 1 : 1. Then, Mustafin presented a summary table of colors of solutions of mellitic acid trianhydride in 62 organic solvents and proposed original procedures for determining mellitic acid and some other organic compounds. During these years the young organic chemist fell in love with analytical chemistry. Then the Second World War started and Mustafin joined the army, taking with him his laboratory journal and the first volume of Mendeleyev’s “Principles of Chemistry.” After returning from the army to the university, Mustafin started his work at the division of analytical chemistry headed by the famous analyst Leonid Markovich Kul’berg. In those years the “advanced” topic in analytical chemistry was the application of organic reagents to analysis. Being on the border of organic, inorganic, and physical chemistry, this field grew with the most interesting results, stimulating the further development of spectroscopic, potentiometric, luminescent, and other methods of analysis. Based on the results of his own experiments and calculations, Mustafin came to the conclusion that there are objective reasons restricting the possibilities of improving the sensitivity and accuracy of chemical analysis with organic reagents. Further scientific considerations allowed Mustafin to calculate the sensitivity limits of various analytical reagents and the most widespread methods of analysis in the 1950–1960s. The division of analytical chemistry headed by Mustafin conducted intensive experimental research into the synthesis and search for new effective reagents for inorganic ions. The studies were carried on in three directions: the accumulation of empirical data for theory development; the practical approbation of the proposed theoretical suppositions; and the practical use of the results. To improve the visually observed contrast of the transition in titration, Mustafin proposed the method of inner light filters. This method consists in the introduction of appropriate indifferent dyes into the reaction system, capable of improving the contrast of the color transition of the indicator at the equivalence point and, thus, to increase the sensitivity of titrimetric determinations. Professor Mustafin actively participated in the compilation of the rational assortment of organic reagents and also in publishing numerous monographs of the series «Organicheskie reagenty dlya opredeleniya neorganicheskikh ionov» (Organic Reagents for Determining Inorganic Ions). Each monograph of this series was devoted to the analytical chemistry of one chemical element. In addition to the chemical analytical properties of ions, the monographs included detailed determination procedures with the recommended reagents for gravimetric, titrimetric, photometric, and luminescent analysis. This initiative had no analogue in scientific literature and was approved by the experts. Professor Mustafin was a remarkable historian of chemistry. He was the author of historiographic studies devoted to the life and activity of A.N. Vyshnegradskii, A.N. Popov, and L.A. Chugaev. The fundamental historical and scientific work by Mustafin was the monograph «Ocherki po istorii khimii» (Sketches on the history of chemistry), in which he considered the major events in the accumulation of chemical knowledge and the development of experimental methods for studying substances. One of the first among the university professors, Mustafin started to deliver a course of the history of chemistry, which became a well-known event in university life. He was able to make this course a real encyclopedia of natural sciences, bound with analytical chemistry, the starting point of all sciences in his opinion, with a common thread. A great deal of attention was given by the scientist to the problems of natural scientific education: he, with pleasure, read Sunday lectures for senior pupils from Saratov’s schools; maintained friendly relations with many school teachers who asked for his help in quite different problems; and introduced professor’s consultations, the most democratic dialogue between the professor and student, into practice. He believed that the teacher should pave the way for students’ questions and for their desire to conduct experiments and learn more about the surrounding world. He liked to dwell on phenomena that gave enough reasons for amazement and self-motivated studies. Professor Mustafin sincerely wished to give his love of analytical chemistry to the surrounding people, improving the facilities of his students, and presenting complicated information vividly and memorably. Until today, the staff of the Saratov TV studio recollects educational programs in chemistry with the participation of Professor Mustafin: the editor of the program Lyudmila Boiko, a philologist, recollects that the most interesting lessons in chemistry were given to her by professor Mustafin in recording TV programs; to this day she remembers his curious parallels and witty notes. For example, Mustafin stated that chemical reaction is similar to a performance, in which all characters are known, and chemical thermodynamics allows one to peep behind the curtain and find out what will become with the heroes of this performance as a result of the chemical reaction. Speaking about chemical elements, he assimilated them to people, differing from each other in their activity and their ability and readiness to come into contact with each other. He knew how to emphasize the main points and select memorable laws. He died suddenly and unexpectedly in December, 1968.

After the death of the scientist, the journal continued publishing papers prepared by him during the last years of his life, followed by the works of his students and the materials of conferences devoted to his memory. Such conferences, Mustafin’s readings, and scientific workshops are regularly held at the Saratov State University by his students in memory of their teacher and analytical chemist of the first half of the 20th century.
