= Doppler optical coherence tomography =

- Purpose: images of tissue via backscattered light

Optical coherence tomography (OCT) is a technique that displays images of the tissue by using the backscattered light.

Not only conserving the excellence of OCT, doppler optical coherence tomography also combines the doppler effect principle as a whole, which result in tomographic images with high resolution.

== History ==
Due to the recognized significance of noninvasive techniques of imaging in the medical field, especially for imaging in vivo blood flow, OCT has become a popular research topic recently. Not only conserving the excellence of OCT, Doppler Optical Coherence Tomography also combines the Doppler effect principle as a whole, which results in tomographic images with high resolution with static and moving constituents.

In 1991, the first use of coherence gating to localized flow velocity was reported. The author of that article measured the 1-dimensional velocity of the flow of particles, which blazed away in coherence gating measurements. Scientists continue to find ways to measure 2-dimensional velocity, and the first result was reported in 1997, where it reported using spectrogram in doing in vivo DOCT. The same disadvantages occur when using the spectrogram method to do in vivo tissue structure and flow velocity imaging, as spectral-domain OCT is limited to fast imaging. Phase-resolved Doppler OCT, based around the invention of Fourier-Domain OCT, was invented to overcome these limitations.

There are two types of Doppler OCT: Time domain Doppler OCT and Fourier Domain Doppler OCT. The basic principle of Phase-resolved Doppler OCT uses the phase change between sequential A-line scans for velocity image reconstruction. Using this principle, scanning speed is prominently increased. While decoupling the spatial resolution and velocity sensitivity in flow images, again it increases imaging speed. This improvement shows prominent increase in the scanning speed and sensitivity, which makes it possible to image in vivo tissue microcirculation in human skin. Because of its exceptionally high spatial resolution and velocity sensitivity, Doppler OCT has its own position in the field of biomedical research and clinical medicine.

== Principles of Doppler OCT ==
Optical coherence tomogram of a fingertip. It is possible to observe the sweat glands, having "corkscrew appearance"

Doppler Optical Coherence Tomography is an extension of OCT, where it combines the Doppler effect principle to achieve high resolution tomographic images in biological tissues. And because of its high resolution and velocity sensitivity, there are many applications in the medical field. The basic phenomenon of Doppler OCT can be explained below. Light is emitted from the instrument's light source, and enters the medium. Light hits the moving particles and is backscattered from the sample. Then the light interferes with the light in the reference beam, causing a Doppler frequency shift $F_D$ in the interference fringe:

$$F _D \left ( v \right ) = \left [ \left ( \frac{1}{2 \pi } \right ) \right] \cdot ( v ) (k_o-k_i) \qquad \quad (1)$$

where $k_i$ and $k_o$ are wave vectors of incident and out scattered light, and v is the velocity of the moving particle the instrument is detecting. Doppler OCT measures the light backscattered from the sample medium. Defining the angle between the particle flow and the incident light beam is θ, the Doppler shift is then simplified to

$$F_D \left ( \theta \right ) = \left [ \left ( \frac{ 2 V cos \theta }{ \lambda } \right ) \right] \qquad \quad (2)$$

where $\lambda_0$ is the wavelength of the light source.

The instrumentation system of Doppler OCT is an extension of the system of OCT. It also uses a fiber optic Michelson interferometer with a broadband light as a source. The main difference is what happens in the signal processing. After the light emitting from the broadband light source, the light goes through a 2,2 fiber coupler, which split the light equally and separately into the reference and samples arms. The light that goes through the sample arms enters the sample medium and backscattered. At the same time, the light in the reference arm is reflected back from the mirror and couples with the light in the sample arm. The spectral domain fringe signal, $P_{ODT}$ is given by

$$P _{ODT} \left ( \nu \right ) =  2S_0 \left ( \nu \right ) K_r \left ( \nu \right ) K_s \left ( \nu \right ) cos[2 \pi \nu\ (( \Delta + 2n V_zt)/c+ \tau )]  \qquad \quad (3)$$

The corresponding time domain signal, $T_{ODT}$, is given by

$$T _{ODT} \left ( \tau \right ) =  2 \int S_0 \left ( \nu \right ) K_r \left ( \nu \right ) K_s \left ( \nu \right ) cos[2 \pi \nu\ (( \Delta + 2n V_zt)/c+ \tau )] \,d\nu.  \qquad \quad (4)$$

Fourier Transform relations between the time domain signals and spectral domain signals are shown in the equations above, which correspond to the two types of OCT. As a result, the time domain method and the Fourier domain method can both achieve high-resolutions.

== Time Domain Doppler OCT Based on Spectrogram Method ==
Time domain Doppler OCT uses the spectrogram method to create the image. When the spectrum changes with time, it is defined as Spectrogram. The power spectrum represents the power of signal at certain frequencies, which can be used to calculate the spectrogram. The short-time fast Fourier transformation (STFFT) is used to calculate the power spectrum.

$$T _{ODT} \left ( \tau  \right ) = (STFFT(f_m, \tau _{ODT}))^2  \qquad \quad (5)$$

where $f_m$ is the various frequency.

Fluid flow velocity can be calculated as:

$$V _{ODT} \left ( i \right) =  \frac{  \lambda _0 f_D}{ 2ncos \theta}  =  \frac{  \lambda _0 (f_c - f_o)}{ 2ncos \theta}  \qquad \quad (6)$$

where $f_{D}$ is the Doppler frequency shift, $f_{0}$ is the carrier frequency, $f_{c}$ is the centroid frequency and θ is the angle between ki and v.

When dealing with high speed imaging, due to many factors, the velocity sensitivity is unsatisfied. When the velocity resolution is increased, imaging speed and spatial resolution are decreased. As a result, the spectrogram method cannot satisfy both high imaging speed and high velocity sensitivity.

== Phase-Resolved Doppler OCT Method ==
In each scan, the phase would be different. Phase-resolved Doppler OCT uses this phase change to develop flow velocity images, which can obtain both high imaging speed, high velocity sensitivity, and high spatial resolution. By calculating the phase change, the Doppler frequency shift $f_{n}$ can be determined:

$$f_n = \frac{\Delta \Phi }{2 \pi T}   \qquad \quad (7)$$

The standard deviation of the Doppler spectrum is as follow:

$$\sigma ^2= \frac{\int (f-f_D)^2 (P \left(f\right))df}{\int(P \left(f\right))df }\qquad \quad (8)$$

where P(f) is the Doppler power spectrum and $f_{D}$ is the centroid value of the Doppler frequency shift.

Changing flow velocity impacts the value of the standard deviation. When the difference in flow velocity becomes larger, the Doppler frequency spectrum becomes wider. As a result, the standard deviation becomes larger.

== Fourier domain phase-resolved doppler OCT method ==
Fourier domain OCT measures interference fringes in the spectral domain. There are two methods: a spectrometer based system and a swept laser source based system to obtain high velocity sensitivity, high imaging speed, and various velocity range
