= Patrikeyev =

Patrikeyev or Patrikeev (Russian: Патрикеев; feminine: Patrikeyeva or Patrikeeva) is a Russian patronymic surname derived from the given name Patrikey. It is associated wit Russian noble families, Patrikeyev princes and Patrikeyev dvoryans.

Notable people with the surname include.

- Nadezhda Andreyeva (née Patrikeyeva; 1959–2014), Russian alpine skier
- Vassian Patrikeyev, 16th century Russian ecclesiastic and political figure
- Yury Patrikeyev (born 1979), Armenian-Russian wrestler
