= Optical coherence elastography =

Optical coherence elastography (OCE) is an emerging imaging technique used in biomedical imaging to form pictures of biological tissue in micron and submicron level and maps the biomechanical property of tissue.

== Introduction ==
Elastography was first used in 1979 and subsequent progress in the field has been extensive, based largely on ultrasound, and magnetic resonance imaging. Optical techniques have also been proposed for elastography to probe mechanical properties of tissues dates back to at least the 1950s. In 1998, Schmitt first proposed optical coherence elastography (OCE), in employing optical coherence tomography (OCT) detect depth-resolved sample deformation induced by quasi-static compression. The first OCT elastography of arteries was done by the Brezinski group in 2004 But the term optical coherence elastography was first coined in a 2004 paper with Brett Bouma.

Requiring no injections, OCE is a non-invasive imaging method can gives more details than ultrasound or MRI. Using light source to image biological tissue, OCE is considered generally safe compared to CT scan and other radiographic imaging modalities which involve with ionizing radiation. And it is also more affordable and time efficient compared to MRI. However, OCE can also cause tissue damage in some handling. For example, surface acoustic wave OCE can cause to a tissue is primarily concentrated on temperature effects. In the focus point, the temperature of the tissue will rise locally. Therefore, it is necessary to take this into account in certain circumstances.

OCE is characterized by its niche in intermediate spatial resolution (10s–100s μm) and degree of depth penetration and, by exploiting optical interferometry, its high sensitivity to small mechanical changes—at the microstrain level. However, it's still in the early stage of development and needs more clinical practice before enters into the market.

== Theory ==
Although optical coherence tomography (OCT) provide crucial information for the diagnosis, they often are insufficient for early diagnosis, before structural changes occur. Elastography, the display of the elastic properties of soft tissues, may be performed using ultrasound, magnetic resonance imaging (MRI) or OCT. Elastography has been proven feasible for characterization of ocular tissues.

Tissue exhibits varying degrees of viscoelasticity (time-dependent response to a load), poroelasticity (presence of fluid-filled pores or channels), and anisotropy, as well as a nonlinear relationship between elasticity and the applied load. As a starting point in establishing the link between elasticity and displacement, a number of simplifying assumptions are usually made about tissue behavior and structure. Most commonly, tissue is approximated as a linear elastic solid with isotropic mechanical properties. The assumption of linearity is commonly valid for the level of strain (typically <10%) applied in elastography.

== Selected applications ==
=== Ophthalmology ===
In ophthalmology, OCE could be utilized to characterize the mechanical properties of the cornea in order to diagnose related ocular disease: especially to diagnose and assess the properties of keratoconus, which provides necessary information to establish adaptive biomechanical models of the cornea for the optimization of individual laser ablation procedure. It also helps improve the management of collagen cross-linking therapy. The methods utilizing OCE to study these properties are still under investigation and some particular ones listed below seem promising to be developed into clinical use. Methods could be divided into two main categories based on required interactions which are in-contact and non-contact detections.

==== Contact detection ====
In contact detection using a standard clinical gonioscopy, direct contact with the cornea using gonioscopy creates static compression and resultant displacement amplitude inside the cornea responding to the compression indicates the heterogeneous mechanical properties of the cornea.

==== Non-contact detection ====
Non-contact detection methods including creating mechanical contrasts by pulsed laser and focused air puff stimulation Non-contact OCE detection methods are more likely to be developed into clinical usages since they are more comfortable and applicable for patients. Pulsed laser is used to generate surface acoustic waves on the cornea and then quantitative Young's modulus measurements of the cornea could be obtained[122]. The focused air puff, described as short duration (<1ms) and low pressure (level of pascal) is capable to measure the cornea stiffness in a safe and easy-to-control stimulus.

=== Dermatology ===
The elasticity of skin could indicate related pathologies such as scleroderma and cancer. Developing OCE technology could detect differences in stiffness of human skin layers in vivo. Besides, with dynamic mechanical loading coupled to skin surface, OCE is also capable of making Young's modulus measurements from the quantification of the surface wave velocity based on phase shift of the displacement profile, and thus showing the hydration and dehydration effect of the in vivo human skin.

=== Oncology ===
Imaging ex vivo excised tissues to perform two-dimensional mapping of elastic modulus. By either applying static or dynamic compression loading, different sample regions with different stiffness could be highlighted with the mapping of displacement amplitude in a 2D depth-resolved elastogram. Experiments have shown that such method could be utilized to detect tumor region in ex vivo rat mammary tissues.

Assisting intraoperative assessment by detecting exact tumor margin. Recently, the needle OCE technique is applied whereas integrates OCE with a needle probe. The needle tip works as the compression loading when inserted into tissue, and the resultant displacement amplitude of tissue is plotted over depth. In this way, the relative stiffness of different regions of tissue could be shown as well as the sharp change in strains that differentiates the tumor boundary from healthy tissue.

=== Cardiology ===
To improve management of atherosclerosis, monitoring the stability of plaque by mechanical characterization of the arterial wall plays an important role. This task has always been done by utilizing intravascular ultrasound (IVUS) elastography to characterize the elastic properties of parts within the plaque. Plaque components and stability could be analyzed based on these detected elastic properties. However, detailed plaque structural detection could be limited due to IVUS elastography's relatively low spatial frequency (hundreds of microns). Intravascular OCE could perfectly complements IVUS elastography by developing high-resolution biomechanical imaging of the arterial wall.

=== Research Tools ===
OCE could be utilized to determine mechanical properties of engineered tissues at their early stage of development.
