= List of Georgian surnames =

This is the list of surnames of Georgian people.

== A (ა) ==
- Antonidze (ანტონიძე)
- Anakidze (ანაკიძე)
- Arsenadze (არსენაძე)
- Askurava (ასკურავა)
- Amonashvili (ამონაშვილი)
- Amaglobeli (ამაღლობელი)
- Amashukeli (ამაშუკელი)
- Abelishvili (აბელიშვილი)
- Abuserisdze (აბუსერისძე)
- Abshilava (აბშილავა)
- Adamashvili (ადამაშვილი)
- Abasheli (აბაშელი)
- Abesadze (აბესაძე)
- Asanidze (ასანიძე)
- Adamia (ადამია)
- Abakelia (აბაკელია)
- Abashidze (აბაშიძე)
- Abashvili (აბაშვილი)
- Abazasdze (აბაზასძე)
- Abelashvili (აბელაშვილი)
- Abkhazi (აფხაზი)
- Abramia (აბრამია)
- Abramidze (აბრამიძე)
- Abuladze (აბულაძე)
- Abuletisdze (აბულეთისძე)
- Abuselidze (აბუსელიძე)
- Aphridonidze (აფრიდონიძე)
- Agiashvili (აგიაშვილი)
- Akhalkatsi (ახალკაცი)
- Akhalaia (ახალაია)
- Akhaladze (ახალაძე)
- Akhvlediani (ახვლედიანი)
- Alasania (ალასანია)
- Alavidze (ალავიძე)
- Aleksandria (ალექსანდრია)
- Aleksidze (ალექსიძე)
- Altunashvili (ალთუნაშვილი)
- Amilakhvari (ამილახვარი)
- Amirejibi (ამირეჯიბი)
- Amiranashvili (ამირანაშვილი)
- Amirkhanashvili (ამირხანაშვილი)
- Andguladze (ანდღულაძე)
- Anchabadze (ანჩაბაძე)
- Andriadze (ანდრიაძე)
- Andriashvili (ანდრიაშვილი)
- Andronikashvili (ანდრონიკაშვილი)
- Anjaparidze (ანჯაფარიძე)
- Apakidze (აფაქიძე)
- Apkhaidze (აფხაიძე)
- Apkhazava (აფხაზავა)
- Arabidze (არაბიძე)
- Arjevanishvili (არჯევანიშვილი)
- Arakhamia (არახამია)
- Arkania (არქანია)
- Arveladze (არველაძე)
- Arziani (არზიანი)
- Asatiani (ასათიანი)
- Azirashvili (აზირაშვილი)
- Aghoshashvili (აღოშაშვილი)
- Aslanishvili (ასლანიშვილი)
- Avaliani (ავალიანი)
- Avalishvili (ავალიშვილი)
- Atanashvili (ათანაშვილი)

== B (ბ) ==
- Burduli (ბურდული)
- Barbakadze (ბარბაქაძე)
- Barsava (ბარსავა)
- Butskhrikidze (ბუცხრიკიძე)
- Baliashvili (ბალიაშვილი)
- Brokishvili (ბროკიშვილი)
- Babadishvili (ბაბადიშვილი)
- Bagrationi (ბაგრატიონი)
- Bagrationi Davitashvili (ბაგრატიონი დავითაშვილი)
- Bagrationi Mukhraneli (ბაგრატიონი მუხრანელი)
- Bakhia (ბახია)
- Bakhsoliani (ბახსოლიანი)
- Bakradze (ბაქრაძე)
- Bakuradze (ბაკურაძე)
- Balakhadze (ბალახაძე)
- Balanchivadze (ბალანჩივაძე)
- Balavadze (ბალავაძე)
- Bandzeladze (ბანძელაძე)
- Baratashvili (ბარათაშვილი)
- Barnabishvili (ბარნაბიშვილი)
- Batiashvili (ბათიაშვილი)
- Benashvili (ბენაშვილი)
- Benia (surname) (ბენია)
- Baghushvili (ბაღუშვილი)
- Beria (ბერია)
- Beridze (ბერიძე)
- Beradze (ბერაძე)
- Bestavashvili (ბესტავაშვილი)
- Biniashvili (ბინიაშვილი)
- Bochorishvili (ბოჭორიშვილი)
- Bokuchava (ბოკუჩავა)
- Bolkvadze (ბოლქვაძე)
- Botkoveli (ბოტკოველი)
- Burchuladze (ბურჭულაძე)
- Bobokhidze (ბობოხიძე)
- Bukia (ბუკია)
- Bukhrashvili (ბუხრაშვილი)
- Bitsadze (ბიწაძე)
- Basilia (ბასილია)
- Beriashvili (ბერიაშვილი)
- Bunturidze (ბუნტურიძე)

== C (ჩ, ჭ) ==
- Chubinidze (ჩუბინიძე)
- Chapodze (ჭაფოძე)
- Chalatashvili (ჩალათაშვილი)
- Chabukiani (ჭაბუკიანი)
- Chachkhiani (ჩაჩხიანი)
- Chkhikvishvili (ჩხიკვიშვილი)
- Chanturia (ჭანტურია)
- Chankseliani (ჩანქსელიანი)
- Charkviani (ჩარკვიანი)
- Chavchavadze (ჭავჭავაძე)
- Cherkezishvili (ჩერქეზიშვილი)
- Chiaureli (ჭიაურელი)
- Chichua (ჩიჩუა)
- Chikovani (ჩიქოვანი)
- Chitashvili (ჩიტაშვილი)
- Chkadua (ჭკადუა)
- Chkonia (ჭყონია)
- Chkhetidze (ჩხეტიძე)
- Cholokashvili (ჩოლოყაშვილი)
- Chkhartishvili (ჩხარტიშვილი)
- Chakhunashvili (ჩახუნაშვილი)
- Chkhaidze (ჩხაიძე)
- Chkheidze (ჩხეიძე)
- Chutkerashvili (ჩუტკერაშვილი)
- Chikhladze (ჩიხლაძე)
- Chkhaberidze (ჩხაბერიძე)
- Chavchanidze (ჭავჭანიძე)

== D (დ) ==
- Darbaidze (დარბაიძე)
- Demetrashvili (დემეტრაშვილი)
- Davarashvili (დავარაშვილი)
- Dolaberidze (დოლაბერიძე)
- Dadiani (დადიანი)
- Dadeshkeliani (დადეშქელიანი)
- Darchidze (დარჩიძე)
- Darsalia (დარსალია)
- Davitaia (დავითაია)
- Davituliani (დავითულიანი)
- Davitashvili (დავითაშვილი)
- Dgebuadze (დგებუაძე)
- Diasamidze (დიასამიძე)
- Dolidze (დოლიძე)
- Donauri (დონაური)
- Dongvani (დონღვანი)
- Dzambidze (ძამბიძე)
- Dzhugashvili (ჯუღაშვილი)

== E (ე) ==
- Eloshvili (ელოშვილი)
- Eristavi of Aragvi (არაგვის ერისთავი)
- Eristavi of Guria (გურიის ერისთავი)
- Eristavi of Racha (რაჭის ერისთავი)
- Esadze (ესაძე)
- Evgenidze (ევგენიძე)
- Eminadze (ემინაძე)
- Emiridze (ემირიძე)

== G (გ, ღ) ==
- Gogebashvili (გოგებაშვილი)
- Gogeishvili (გოგეიშვილი)
- Gagloshvili (გაგლოშვილი)
- Gogrichiani (გოგრიჭიანი)
- Gabinidze (გაბინიძე)
- Gabunia (გაბუნია)
- Givradze (გივრაძე)
- Gogolauri (გოგოლაური)
- Gabashvili (გაბაშვილი)
- Gabisonia (გაბისონია)
- Gagua (გაგუა)
- Gakharia (გახარია)
- Gandzieli-Gegelia (განძიელი-გეგელია)
- Garakanidze (გარაყანიძე)
- Garsevanishvili (გარსევანიშვილი)
- Gamkrelidze (გამყრელიძე)
- Gamsakhurdia (გამსახურდია)
- Gaprindashvili (გაფრინდაშვილი)
- Gedevanishvili (გედევანიშვილი)
- Geladze (გელაძე)
- Gelovani (გელოვანი)
- Gelashvili (გელაშვილი)
- Gigashvili (გიგაშვილი)
- Giorgadze (გიორგაძე)
- Giorgashvili (გიორგაშვილი)
- Giorgobiani (გიორგობიანი)
- Giunashvili (გიუნაშვილი)
- Glonti (ღლონტი)
- Gloveli (გლოველი)
- Gogoladze (გოგოლაძე)
- Gogniashvili (გოგნიაშვილი)
- Gotsiridze (გოცირიძე)
- Gruzinsky (გრუზინსკი)
- Gugunava (გუგუნავა)
- Gulordava (გულორდავა)
- Guramishvili (გურამიშვილი)
- Gurgenidze (გურგენიძე)
- Guruli (გურული)
- Gurieli (გურიელი)
- Gvazava (გვაზავა)
- Guluashvili (გულუაშვილი)
- Gvasalia (გვასალია)
- Ghurtskaia (ღურწკაია)
- Gogolidze (გოგოლიძე)
- Gorjoladze (გორჯოლაძე)
- Gobejishvili (გობეჯიშვილი)
- Gugeshashvili (გუგეშაშვილი)
- Gumburashvili (გუმბურაშვილი)
- Gochitashvili (გოჩიტაშვილი)

== I (ი) ==
- Izoria (იზორია)
- Iakobidze (იაკობიძე)
- Iakobashvili (იაკობაშვილი)
- Iarajuli (იარაჯული)
- Iashvili/Yachvili (იაშვილი)
- Induashvili (ინდუაშვილი)
- Iluridze (ილურიძე)
- Imedashvili (იმედაშვილი)
- Iosava (იოსავა)
- Ioseliani (იოსელიანი)
- Ivanishvili (ივანიშვილი)
- Ivanashvili (ივანაშვილი)

== J (ჯ, ჟ) ==
- Jambakur-Orbeliani (ჯამბაკურ-ორბელიანი)
- Jangulashvili (ჯანგულაშვილი)
- Jalagonia (ჯალაღონია)
- Jaliashvili (ჯალიაშვილი)
- Jananashvili (ჯანანაშვილი)
- Janashia (ჯანაშია)
- Jandieri (ჯანდიერი)
- Japaridze (ჯაფარიძე)
- Jaqeli (ჯაყელი)
- Javakhishvili (ჯავახიშვილი)
- Javrishvili (ჯავრიშვილი)
- Jajanidze (ჯაჯანიძე)
- Jeladze (ჯელაძე)
- Jibuti (ჯიბუტი)
- Jinjikhashvili (ჯინჯიხაშვილი)
- Jishkariani (ჯიშკარიანი)
- Jorjadze (ჯორჯაძე)
- Jughashvili (ჯუღაშვილი)
- Janezashvili (ჯანეზაშვილი)

== K (კ, ქ, ყ, ხ) ==
- Kipshidze (ყიფშიძე)
- Kichakmadze (კიჭაყმაძე)
- Khachapuridze (ხაჭაპურიძე)
- Kvirtia (კვირტია)
- Kochiashvili (ყოჩიაშვილი)
- Kakauridze (კაკაურიძე)
- Kakabadze (კაკაბაძე)
- Kokilashvili (კოკილაშვილი)
- Kakhaberidze (კახაბერიძე)
- Kakhidze (კახიძე)
- Kalichava (ყალიჩავა)
- Kapanadze (კაპანაძე)
- Kasradze (კასრაძე)
- Kaukhchishvili (ყაუხჩიშვილი)
- Kazbegi (ყაზბეგი)
- Kereselidze (კერესელიძე)
- Keshelashvili (ქეშელაშვილი)
- Kashibadze (ქაშიბაძე)
- Kaldani (ქალდანი)
- Kartskhia (ქარცხია)
- Ketishvili (ქეთიშვილი)
- Khetsuriani (ხეცურიანი)
- Kharaishvili (ხარაიშვილი)
- Khardziani (ხარძიანი)
- Khatiashvili (ხატიაშვილი)
- Kherkheulidze (ხერხეულიძე)
- Khetaguri (ხეთაგური)
- Khidirbegishvili (ხიდირბეგიშვილი)
- Khimshiashvili (ხიმშიაშვილი)
- Khinkalidze (ქობულაერრბუ)
- Khinchagashvili (ხინჩაგაშვილი)
- Khinchegashvili (ხინჩეგაშვილი)
- Khinchigashvili (ხინჩიგაშვილი)
- Khomeriki (ხომერიკი)
- Khrikuli (ხრიკული)
- Khutsishvili (ხუციშვილი)
- Khurtsidze (ხურციძე)
- Khujadze (ხუჯაძე)
- Khurtsilava (ხურცილავა)
- Kiknadze (კიკნაძე)
- Kipiani (ყიფიანი)
- Kobakhia (კობახია)
- Kobakhidze (კობახიძე)
- Kobalia (ქობალია)
- Kobauri (კობაური)
- Kobulashvili (ქობულაშვილი)
- Kochakidze (ქოჩაკიძე)
- Kodoshvili (კოდოშვილი)
- Koridze (ქორიძე)
- Kotrikadze (კოტრიკაძე)
- Kvaratskhelia (კვარაცხელია)
- Kvernadze (კვერნაძე)
- Kublashvili (კუბლაშვილი)
- Kulumbegashvili (ყულუმბეგაშვილი)
- Kurdgelashvili (კურდღელაშვილი)
- Kurdgelia (კურდღელია)
- Kurtanidze (კურტანიძე)
- Kvekvetsia (კვეკვეცია)
- Kutateladze (ქუთათელაძე)
- Kavtarashvili (ქავთარაშვილი)
- Kavtaradze (ქავთარაძე)
- Kandelaki (კანდელაკი)
- Kobaladze (კობალაძე)
- Kobalava (კობალავა)
- Kupriashvili (კუპრიაშვილი)

== L (ლ) ==
- Lagazidze (ლაგაზიძე)
- Lomisashvili (ლომისაშვილი)
- Labadze (ლაბაძე)
- Lazarashvili (ლაზარაშვილი)
- Licheli (ლიჩელი)
- Leonidze (ლეონიძე)
- Liparteliani (ლიპარტელიანი)
- Lobzhanidze (ლობჟანიძე)
- Lortkipanidze (ლორთქიფანიძე)
- Lomidze (ლომიძე)
- Lomtadze (ლომთაძე
- Laliashvili (ლალიაშვილი)
- Laghidze (ლაღიძე)
- Loladze (ლოლაძე)
- Lomaia (ლომაია)

== M (მ) ==
- Mariamidze (მარიამიძე)
- Mamulashvili (მამულაშვილი)
- Mindiashvili (მინდიაშვილი)
- Monavardisashvili (მონავარდისაშვილი)
- Machabeli (მაჩაბელი)
- Machavariani (მაჭავარიანი)
- Machutadze (მაჭუტაძე)
- Maghalashvili (მაღალაშვილი)
- Makharoblidze (მახარობლიძე)
- Maisuradze (მაისურაძე)
- Mamaladze (მამალაძე)
- Manvelishvili (მანველიშვილი)
- Mgeladze (მგელაძე)
- Mchedlishvili (მჭედლიშვილი)
- Mdivani (მდივანი)
- Melikishvili (მელიქიშვილი)
- Melkadze (მელქაძე)
- Melua (მელუა)
- Menteshashvili (მენთეშაშვილი)
- Meskhi (მესხი)
- Midelashvili (მიდელაშვილი)
- Mikeladze (მიქელაძე)
- Mikelashvili (მიქელაშვილი)
- Mildiani (მილდიანი)
- Mkheidze (მხეიძე)
- Mosulishvili (მოსულიშვილი)
- Museliani (მუსელიანი)
- Mukhraneli (მუხრანელი)
- Mzhavanadze (მჟავანაძე)
- Murtazashvili (მურთაზაშვილი)
- Mghebrishvili (მღებრიშვილი)
- Maghularia (მაღულარია)
- Machaidze (მაჩაიძე)

== N (ნ) ==
- Nakani (ნაკანი)
- Nakashidze (ნაკაშიძე)
- Navrozashvili (ნავროზაშვილი)
- Nanava (ნანავა)
- Nareklishvili (ნარეკლიშვილი)
- Nemsadze (ნემსაძე)
- Nikoladze (ნიკოლაძე)
- Nikolashvili (ნიკოლაშვილი)
- Nikolaishvili (ნიკოლაიშვილი)
- Nioradze (ნიორაძე)
- Nizharadze (ნიჟარაძე)
- Nogaideli (ნოღაიდელი)
- Nozadze (ნოზაძე)
- Narsidze (ნარსიძე)

== O (ო) ==
- Oboladze (ობოლაძე)
- Obolashvili (ობოლაშვილი)
- Ochiauri (ოჩიაური)
- Oniani (ონიანი)
- Orbeliani (ორბელიანი)
- Okinashvili (ოკინაშვილი)
- Okropiridze (ოქროპირიძე)
- Okroshidze (ოყროშიძე)
- Orjonikidze (ორჯონიკიძე)

== P (ფ, პ) ==
- Pachulia (ფაჩულია)
- Pankvelashvili (ფანქველაშვილი)
- Palavandishvili (ფალავანდიშვილი)
- Papaskiri (პაპასკირი)
- Pataraia (პატარაია)
- Patarava (პატარავა)
- Patarkatsishvili (პატარკაციშვილი)
- Pertakhia (პერტახია)
- Pavlenishvili (ფავლენიშვილი)
- Pavliashvili (ფავლიაშვილი)
- Petridze (პეტრიძე)
- Petriashvili (პეტრიაშვილი)
- Pirtskhalaishvili (ფირცხალაიშვილი)
- Pkheidze (ფხეიძე)
- Peradze (ფერაძე)
- Paatashvili (პაატაშვილი)
- Popkhadze ( ფოფხაძე)
- Pochkidze (ფოჩხიძე)

== R (რ) ==
- Rapava (რაფავა)
- Razmadze (რაზმაძე)
- Revazishvili (რევაზიშვილი)
- Rekhviashvili (რეხვიაშვილი)
- Rokva (როყვა)
- Rusieshvili (რუსიეშვილი)
- Rukhadze (რუხაძე)

== S (ს, შ) ==
- Salukvadze (სალუქვაძე)
- siordia (სიორდია)
- Svanadze (სვანაძე)
- Saakadze (სააკაძე)
- Saakashvili (სააკაშვილი)
- Sabauri (საბაური)
- Salishvili (სალიშვილი)
- Samadalashvili (სამადალაშვილი)
- Sanikidze (სანიკიძე)
- Saralidze (სარალიძე)
- Shaburidze (შაბურიძე)
- Shavadze (შავაძე)
- Shavlidze (შავლიძე)
- Sakandelidze (საკანდელიძე)
- Sekhniashvili (სეხნიაშვილი)
- Shalikashvili (შალიკაშვილი)
- Shengelia (შენგელია)
- Shekiladze (შეყილაძე)
- Shervashidze (შერვაშიძე)
- Shetekauri (შეთეკაური)
- Shevardnadze (შევარდნაძე)
- Shiolashvili (შიოლაშვილი)
- Shishniashvili (შიშნიაშვილი)
- Shvelidze (შველიძე)
- Sichinava (სიჭინავა)
- Sidamon-Eristavi (სიდამონ-ერისთავი)
- Sikharulidze (სიხარულიძე)
- Sologashvili (სოლოღაშვილი)
- Spanderashvili (სპანდერაშვილი)
- Stepanishvili (სტეფანიშვილი)
- Sukhishvili (სუხიშვილი)
- Shushania (შუშანია)
- Svanidze (სვანიძე)

== T (თ, ტ, წ, ც) ==
- Tabagari (თაბაგარი)
- Tsertsvadze (ცერცვაძე)
- Tsofurashvili (ცოფურაშვილი)
- Tsartsidze (ცარციძე)
- Tvalabeishvili (თვალაბეიშვილი)
- Tatishvili (ტატიშვილი)
- Tarkhnishvili (თარხნიშვილი)
- Tavberidze (თავბერიძე)
- Tavdgiridze (თავდგირიძე)
- Targamadze (თარგამაძე)
- Topuria (თოფურია)
- Tsetskhladze (ცეცხლაძე)
- Tsereteli (წერეთელი)
- Tsintsadze (ცინცაძე)
- Tsitsishvili (ციციშვილი)
- Tsiklauri (წიკლაური)
- Tskitishvili (ცქიტიშვილი)
- Tsulukidze (წულუკიძე)
- Tomadze (თომაძე)
- Tomashvili (თომაშვილი)
- Toreli (თორელი)
- Tugushi (ტუღუში)
- Tumanishvili (თუმანიშვილი)
- Tusishvili (ტუსიშვილი)
- Tavkhelidze (თავხელიძე)
- Tsenteradze (ცენტერაძე)
- Titilokashvili (თითილოკაშვილი)
- Tvauri (თვაური)
- Toriashvili (ტორიაშვილი)
- Tarielashvili (ტარიელაშვილი)
- Tabidze (ტაბიძე)
- Tabatadze (ტაბატაძე)

== U (უ) ==
- Uchaneishvili (უჩანეიშვილი)
- Ujmajuridze (უჯმაჯურიძე)
- Undiladze (უნდილაძე)
- Urushadze (ურუშაძე)
- Urjumelashvili (ურჯუმელაშვილი)

== V (ვ) ==
- Velijanashvili (ველიჯანაშვილი)
- Vachnadze (ვაჩნაძე)
- Vakhvakhishvili (ვახვახიშვილი)
- Vardanidze (ვარდანიძე)
- Vardiashvili (ვარდიაშვილი)
- Vezirishvili (ვეზირიშვილი)
- Virsaladze (ვირსალაძე)

== Z (ზ, ჟ) ==
- Zambakhidze (ზამბახიძე)
- Zalkaliani (ზალკალიანი)
- Zamtaradze (ზამთარაძე)
- Zandaradze (ზანდარაძე)
- Zakarashvili (ზაქარაშვილი)
- Zakareishvili (ზაქარეიშვილი)
- Zakariadze (ზაქარიაძე)
- Zibzibadze (ზიბზიბაძე)
- Zumadze (ზუმაძე)
- Zurabashvili (ზურაბაშვილი)
- Zurabishvili (ზურაბიშვილი)
- Zurabiani (ზურაბიანი)
- Zhorzholiani (ჟორჟოლიანი)
- Zhozhikashvili (ჟოჟიკაშვილი)
- Zhvania (ჟვანია)
- Zoidze (ზოიძე)
- Zotikishvili (ზოტიკიშვილი)
- Zviadadze (ზვიადაძე)
- Zandarashvili (ზანდარაშვილი)
- Zakaidze (ზაქაიძე)

== See also ==
- Georgian surname
- List of Georgian princely families
