= Zemo Kandaura =

Village in Georgia

Zemo Kandaura ზემო ყანდაურა
- Village
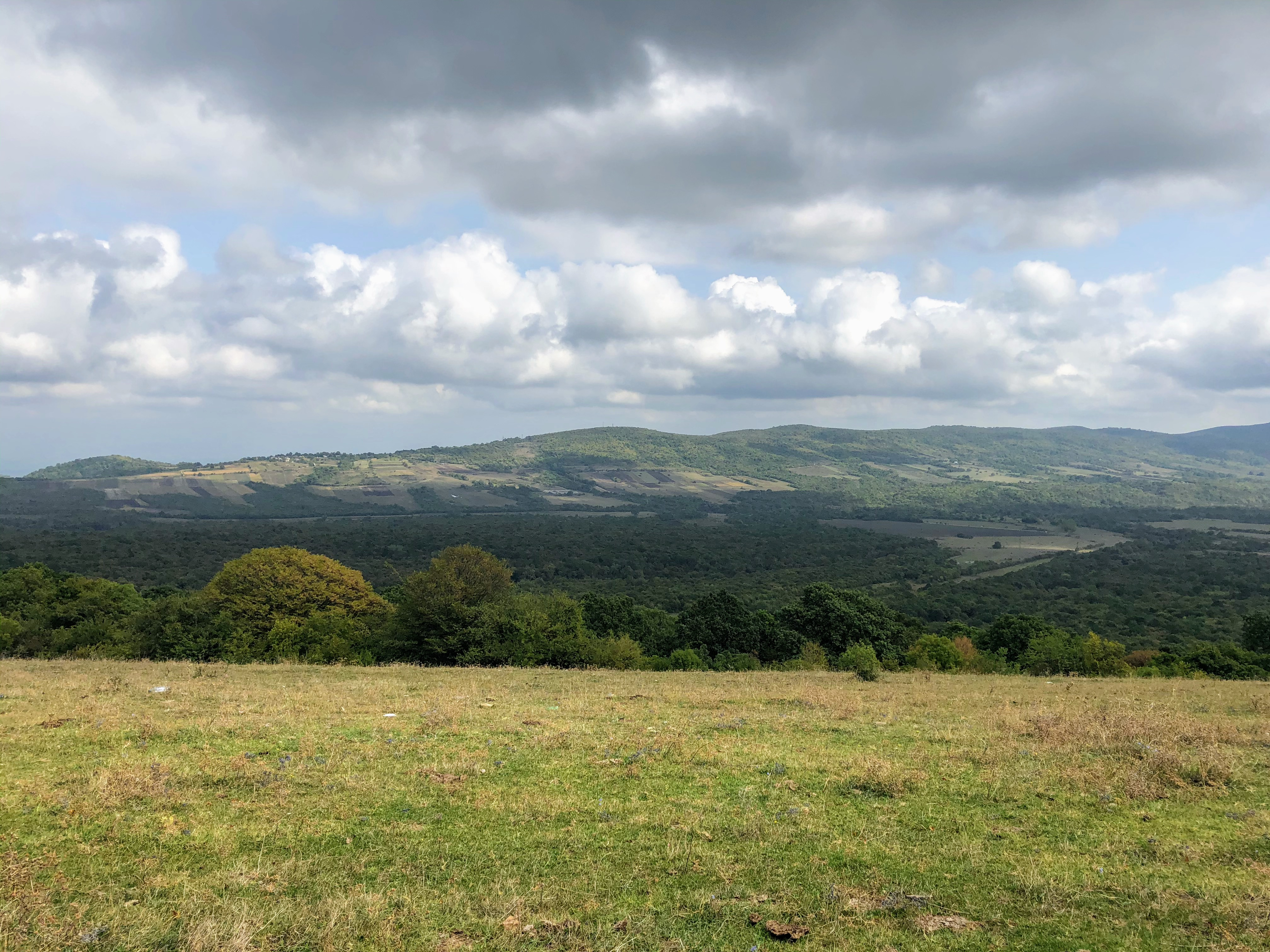
- View of the Tsiv-Gombori Range from the village of Zemo Kandaura

- Location of Zemo Kandaura Zemo Kandaura (Kakheti)
- Coordinates: 41°40′40″N 45°35′33″E
- Country: Georgia
- Region: Kakheti
- Municipality: Sagarejo
- Village: 1930
- Elevation: 900 m (3,000 ft)

Population (1 January 2024)
  - Total: 28
- Time zone: UTC+4 (Georgian Time)

Zemo (Upper) Kandaura (Georgian: ზემო ყანდაურა) — is a village in Georgia. It is part of the Sagarejo Municipality of the Kakheti region.

== Geography ==
The village is located on the southwestern slope of the Tsiv-Gombori Range at an elevation of 900 m above sea level. It is 6 km from the nearest railway station, in the village of Badiauri, and 36 km from the city of Sagarejo, the administrative centre of the municipality.

== History ==
The village was established in 1930 as a result of the division of the historic village of Kandaura into Upper (Zemo) and Lower (Kvemo) Kandaura, following the establishment of the Sagarejo District.

The village of Kandaura (originally known as Kandiauri (Georgian: ყანდიაური)) was established in the Middle Ages and belonged to the possessions of the Alaverdi Monastery. In 1616, it was devastated by the army of the Persian shah Abbas the Great, as a result of which it remained deserted for more than a century and a half.

It was revived in the 1790s by Heraclius II, king of Kartli-Kakheti, who resettled some of his own vassals in Kandaura. By a decree of Catholicos-Patriarch Anton II (the king's son) dated 23 February 1797, tax revenues from the estate were divided equally between the royal treasury and the Alaverdi Monastery. The king subsequently granted the village to his son, Prince Mirian. During the reign of Heraclius II, the mouravi (administrator) of Kandaura was Prince Ioseb Jandieri.

Among the first settlers were people from Kartli (the princes Javakhishvili, Sidamonidze; Gabrielashvili, Glakhashvili, Durglishvili, Kekoshvili, Kartvelishvili, Khorbaladze), Racha (aznauri Gamkrelidze; Archvadze, Maisuradze, Kobakhidze), Imereti (the princes Abesadze, Pkhaladze; Giorgadze, Nutsubidze, Samkharadze), and Samegrelo (Shengelia-Shengelidze).

On 8 May 1802, following the annexation of the Kingdom of Kartli-Kakheti by the Russian Empire, the village was incorporated into the Telavi uezd of the Georgia Governorate (later into the Signakh uezd). In the documents of the Russian administration, Kandaura is described as a Georgian-Armenian village that had a special status as part of the fief of the Bagrationi princes. At the same time, the institution of the mouravi was abolished by the Russian administration. In the 1804 census, the head of the village community (natsvali, "companion") was recorded as Hieromonk Bero Gamkrelidze.

In 1812, the inhabitants of Kandaura actively participated in the Kakheti uprising. Local princes and nobles, led by Svimon Jandieri, the son of the former mouravi, took part in the battle of Sagarejo, where the forces of the Kakheti district under the command of major general Portnyagin were defeated. In February 1812, Kandaura itself was completely cleared of Russian forces. By 1814, the office of mouravi had been restored in the village.

In the second half of the 19th century, Ivane Javakhishvili was elected head of the village community four consecutive times.

In the 1950s, some of the inhabitants of Zemo Kandaura relocated to Badiauri and Kvemo Kandaura. One of the leaders of the local community at the time was Abram Nalekrishvili, a veteran of World War I.

The traditional main occupation of the villagers was cattle breeding. During the summer, livestock were grazed in the Trialeti area, while in winter they were taken to the banks of the Iori River. Other occupations included poultry farming, beekeeping, and winemaking. Industrial wine production in Kandaura dates back to 1850, and among the first known winemakers were Tevdore Nareklishvili, his son Iordane, and his grandson Giorgi Nalekrishvili. The main grape variety cultivated in Kandaura was Rkatsiteli. Local produce was exported abroad.

== Demographics ==
According to the 2024 census, Zemo Kandaura had a population of 28. 96.2% of the village's inhabitants were ethnic Georgians.

Historically, Armenians also constituted a significant part of Kandaura's population and, among other occupations, were engaged in pottery. Kandaura pottery was known throughout Kakheti. The village had two cemeteries, one Georgian and one Armenian. In the 19th century, two Armenian churches operated there, dedicated to the Holy Mother of God and Saint Sargis. Among the churches of the Georgian Orthodox Church in Zemo Kandaura are the churches of All Saints and Saint George, both built in the 19th century and undergoing restoration by local residents since 2010.

== Notable people ==
- Melchizedek III (secular name Mikheil Pkhaladze) (1872–1960) was Catholicos-Patriarch of All Georgia (1952–1960). He was born in Kandaura to Giorgi Pkhaladze, a church reader and later the rector of the local Church of Saint George.
- Avtandil Abesadze (1928–2003) was a Georgian scientist, doctor of medical sciences (1964) and professor (1967).
- Oleksandr Petrovskyi (birth surname Nalekrishvili) is a Ukrainian entrepreneur and philanthropist, president of the International Charitable Foundation "Solidarity". On his father's side, he is descended from the Nareklishvili/Nalekrishvili family of Zemo Kandaura. He is a direct descendant of Prince Tevdore Tsitsishvili, who settled in Kandaura in 1847 and changed his surname to Nareklishvili.
