= Kalu Ndukwe Kalu =

Nigerian political scientist

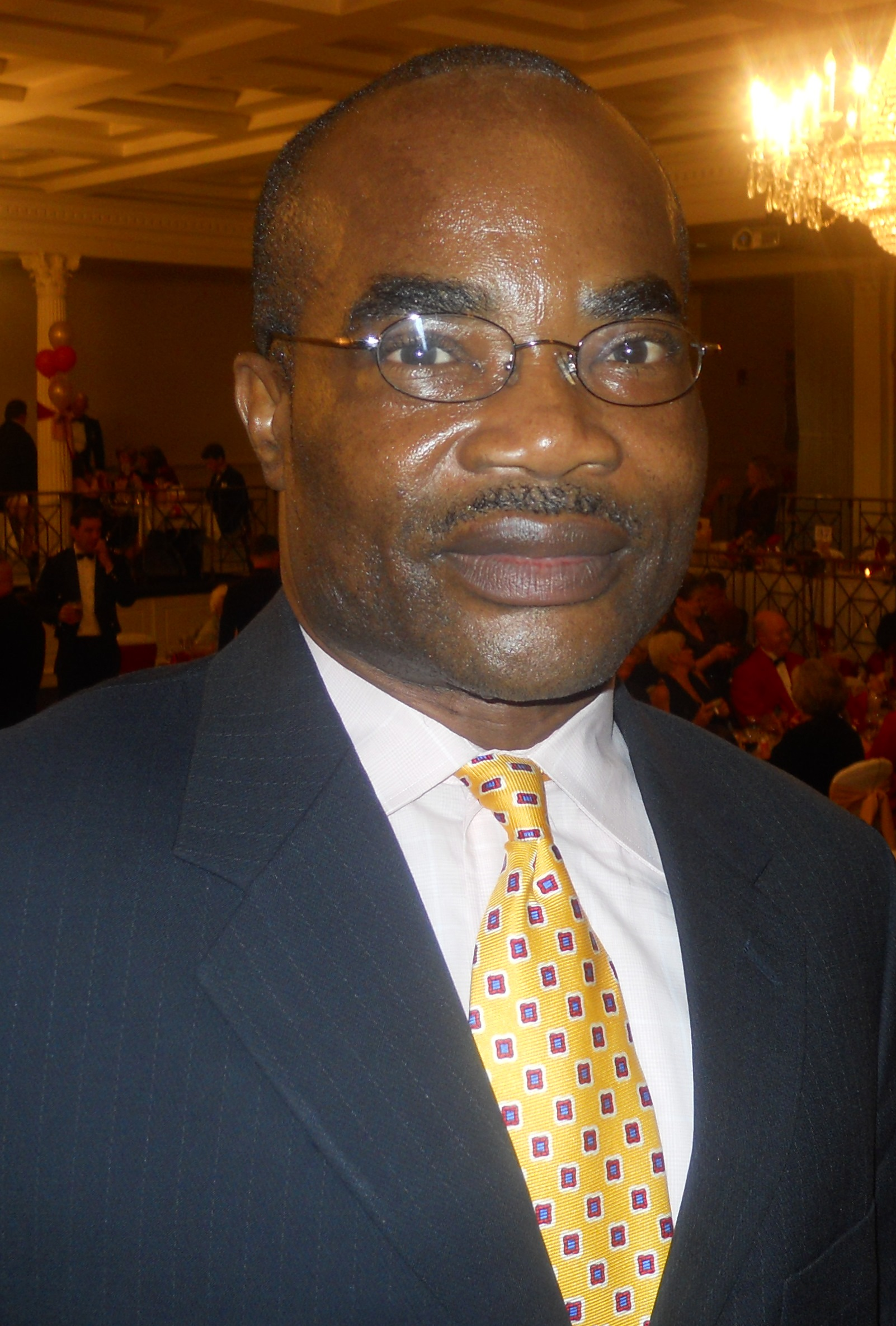
- Kalu at the 236th U.S. Marine Corps Birthday Event, Maxwell Air Force Base, 2011
- Born: Abiriba, Nigeria
- Occupation: Research Professor

Academic background
- Education: Rutgers University, Atlanta University, Texas Tech University, Yale University

Academic work
- Discipline: Political Science/National Security/Organizational Systems

Kalu Ndukwe Kalu is a Nigerian-born American political scientist specializing in comparative institutional development, national security policy, and organizational systems. He is currently a Distinguished Research Professor of Political Science and National Security Policy at Auburn University Montgomery.; and Docent Professor at the University of Tampere, Finland

== Background and professional life ==
Kalu earned his B.Sc. in International Environmental Studies/Environmental Science from Rutgers University, New Brunswick, NJ, with a second major in Philosophy (Existentialism) in 1980; MBA (Organization Theory & Behavior) from Atlanta University in 1982; and a Ph.D. in Political Science from Texas Tech University in 1994. He did post-doctoral studies in political science (democratic theory and institutions, citizenship, and international conflict processes) at Yale University (1996–1999), and post-doctoral graduate coursework (Health Policy & Management) at the Yale School of Medicine (1998–2000). He has taught at several institutions including the University of Connecticut, Storrs/Waterbury; and the University of Tampere, Finland (School of Management/Politics) as a Fulbright Scholar & Visiting professor, 2013–2014. Over the years, he has coordinated at Auburn University Montgomery the General Dwight D. Eisenhower National Security Series: College Program – an outreach program of the U. S. Army War College, Carlisle, PA. His research emphasis is in the areas of institutional development and organizational change, citizenship and administrative theory, IT-leadership interface, technology and culture, complex adaptive systems, national security and intelligence policy, and health care politics and policies.

== Books ==
- "State Power, Autarchy and Political Conquest in Nigerian Federalism" Published: 2008 ISBN 978-0-7391-1955-6
- "Citizenship: A Reality far From Ideal" (co-edited with Nada Kakabadse and Andrew Kakabadse) Published: 2009 ISBN 978-0-230-24488-7
- "Technology, Culture, and Public Policy: Critical Lessons from Finland" Published:2016 ISBN 978-1-48-222344-6
- "Citizenship: Identity, Institutions, and the Postmodern Challenge" Published: 2016 ISBN 978-1-48-222324-8
- "Political Culture, Change, and Security Policy in Nigeria", published (2018). ISBN 978-1-13-847597-7
