= Rusudan =

Rusudani (Georgian: რუსუდანი) or Rusudan (Georgian: რუსუდან) is a feminine Georgian name of Old Persian origin, today widely used in Georgia.

Other forms of name Rusudan used in Georgian are: Rusa, Ruso, Rusiko and Ruska.

It may refer to:

- Rusudan of Georgia (c. 1194-1245), Queen of Georgia (1223-1245)
- Rusudan (daughter of Demetrius I of Georgia) (12th-13th c.), Georgian princess royal
- Rusudan (daughter of George III of Georgia) (12th-13th c.), Georgian princess royal
- Rusudan of Georgia, Empress of Trebizond (13th c.), Georgian princess royal
- Rusudan of Circassia (died 1740), queen consort of the Kingdom of Kartli
- Rusudan Goletiani (born September 8, 1980), Georgian-American chess player
- Rusudan Khoperia, Georgian gymnast
- Rusudan Sikharulidze, Georgian gymnast
- Rusudan Petviashvili, Georgian artist
- Rusudan Bolkvadze, Georgian actress
- Rusudan Gotsiridze, Georgian evangelical bishop
- Rusudan Chkonia, Georgian film director
- Rusudan Glurjidze, Georgian film director
