= Apkhazava =

Apkhazava (Georgian: აფხაზავა) is a Georgian surname. Notable people with the surname include:

- Iakob Apkhazava (born 1991), Georgian professional footballer
- Shalva Apkhazava (1980–2004), Georgian professional footballer
- Taymuraz Apkhazava (born 1955), Soviet Greco-Roman wrestler who was born in Kutaisi, Georgia
- Vladimer Apkhazava (born 1976), Georgian educator
