= Said Gutseriev =

Russian-British businessman (born 1988)

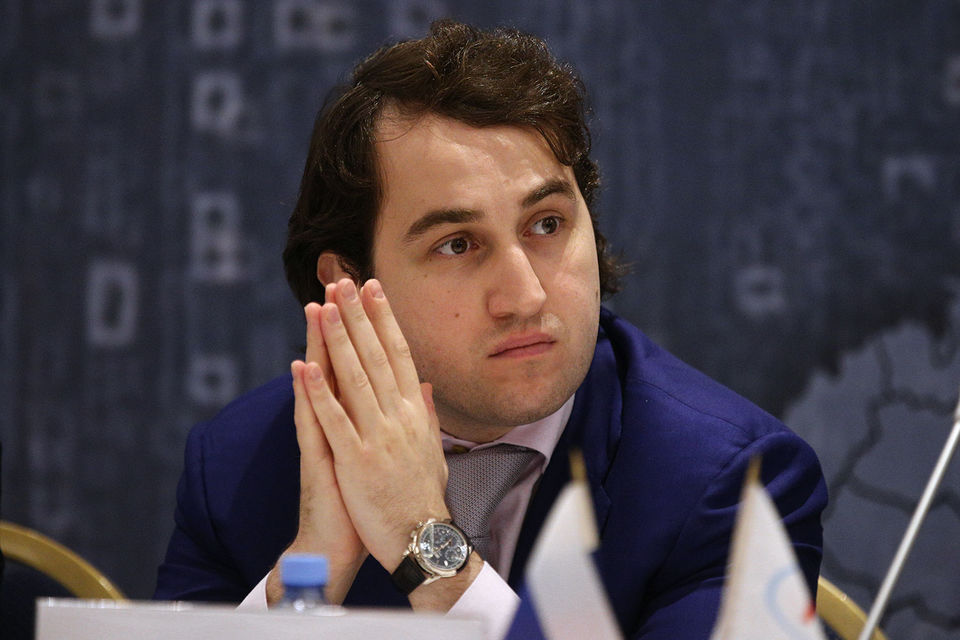
- Gutseriev in 2017
- Born: 18 April 1988 (age 38); Moscow, Russia
- Education: Oxford University; Plymouth University
- Occupation: Businessman
- Known for: PJSC M.Video, SFI Investment Holding
- Spouse: Khadizha Uzhakhova
- Children: 4
- Parent: Mikhail Gutseriyev (father)

Said Mikhailovich Gutseriev (born 18 April 1988) is a Russian-British businessperson of Ingush descent. He is the son of Russian oligarch Mikhail Gutseriev. Since 2018, he has been included by Forbes into the list of wealthiest businessmen in the world. In 2021 his fortune has been estimated at $1.7 billion.

In 2016, he held a wedding that reportedly cost $1 billion. The Pandora Papers leaks revealed that Gutseriev owns a £40m London office block through an offshore company.

== Early life and education ==
Said Gutseriev was born on 18 April 1988 in Moscow. From the age of 8, he was trained and educated in the UK.

After graduation, he continued his education at University of Oxford, where he received master's degree in geology. Then he enrolled at the University of Plymouth, where he was awarded an MA degree in Management of Oil and Gas Business.

Gutseriev has British citizenship. He lives in London.

== Career ==
After graduation from the Plymouth University, from 2012 to 2014 he was working at Glencore (the Swiss trading Company) in London. Said started as the analyst in the Department of Oil Projects’ Structured Financing and continued his work in the financial office of the company.

Since 2014, he has headed and served on the boards of directors of large industrial enterprises engaged in oil production, oil refining, and coal mining. Currently he is a shareholder of PJSC M.video and SFI Investment Holding, which owns Europlan leasing company, 49% of VSK insurance company, cloud gaming service GFN.RU and minority shares in a number of other assets. Said Gutseriev is the founder of Larnabel Ventures.

In 2019 he was new to Forbes list of the wealthiest businessmen, with a fortune of $1.3 billion, ranked at No.1717 spot. In 2021, Forbes estimated his fortune at $1.7 billion.

=== Sanctions ===
On 28 June 2022 he was sanctioned by the United Kingdom. The relevant document of the HM Treasury says Said Gutseriev "is and has been involved in obtaining a benefit from or supporting the Government of Russia by working as a director (whether executive or non-executive), or equivalent, and owning or controlling directly or indirectly, of PJSC SFI, an entity carrying on business in the Russian financial services sector, a sector of strategic significance to the Government of Russia."

== Personal life ==
In March 2016, Said Gutseriev married Khadizha Uzhakhova, a student of the Moscow State University of Medicine and Dentistry. The celebration in Moscow brought together more than 600 guests, who were entertained by Jennifer Lopez, Sting, Enrique Iglesias, Alla Pugacheva, and Patricia Kaas. The bride's wedding dress weighed about 25 kg and cost several million dollars. The second celebration for relatives took place in London. The wedding reportedly cost $1 billion.

The second celebration for friends and relatives took place in London in the event hall of The Dorchester hotel. Stars of world pop music performed in front of 250 guests: Lionel Richie, Kylie Minogue, Robbie Williams, Pink, as well as the Georgian national ballet "Sukhishvili", the Irish dance ensemble "Spirit of the Dance".

In 2018, the couple had a son, who was named Safarbek after his grandfather. In February 2021, the couple had a daughter, named by the ancient Ingush name Deicy (in translation from Ingush - "honor of the fathers"); in June 2022 their second daughter Salma and in January 2024 their third daughter Dayana were born.

The Pandora Papers leaks revealed that Gutseriev owns a £40m London office block through an offshore company.

In 2022, a joint investigation by the Belarusian Investigative Center, Transparency International and The Guardian found several properties in London owned by Said Gutseriev. Previously, the property owned by Said was mentioned in the Pandora Papers. Representatives of the family told reporters that Said has no business ties with his father and that Mikhail Gutseriev has nothing to do with these assets, while at the same time, a significant part of these properties were purchased when Said was still studying and not involved in business.
