= Kakabadze =

Kakabadze or Kakabadse (Georgian: კაკაბაძე) is a Georgian surname that may refer to:

- Andrew Kakabadse, British professor of Georgian origin
- Beka Kakabadze (born 1995), Georgian rugby union player
- David Kakabadze, Georgian painter
- Irakli Kakabadze, Georgian writer
- Lydia Kakabadse (born 1955), British composer
- Mikheil Kakabadze, Georgian geologist
- Nada Kakabadse, British academic and professor
- Otar Kakabadze, Georgian footballer
- Sargis Kakabadze, Georgian historian and philologist
- Silovan Kakabadze, Georgian sculptor and teacher
- Suliko Kakabadze, Georgian footballer
- Yolanda Kakabadse, Ecuadorian conservationist of Georgian origin
- Shalva Kakabadze, American physician of Georgian origin

== See also ==
- 5270 Kakabadze (1979 KR), a main-belt asteroid discovered on 1979
