= Lobjanidze =

Lobjanidze (Georgian: ლობჯანიძე) is a Georgian surname. Notable people with the surname include:

- Elguja Lobjanidze (born 1992), Georgian football player
- Nugzar Lobjanidze (born 1971), Georgian professional football player
- Ucha Lobjanidze (born 1987), Georgian footballer

== See also ==
- Lobzhanidze
