= Cherkezishvili =

Georgian noble family

Coat of arms of Princes Cherkezishvili

The House of Cherkezishvili (Georgian: ჩერქეზიშვილი) is a Georgian noble family, descended from the Circassian chieftains of Great Kabarda, whence the surname, literally meaning "children/descendants of a Circassian" in Georgian. They settled in Kakheti (eastern Georgia) in the 17th century, and attained to a princely dignity of tavadi. Under the Russian rule they were confirmed, in 1829 and 1850, in the princely nobility as knyaz Cherkezov (Черкезовы).

== History ==
The traditional genealogical accounts such as that of Prince Ioane of Georgia at the beginning of the 19th century had it that the Cherkezishvili descended from a Circassian chieftain who had arrived in Georgia during the reign of Queen Tamar (r. 1184–1213). In fact, the ancestor of the family, the Kabardian nobleman Alejuko known to the Georgians as Aladag, settled down in the eastern Georgian kingdom of Kakheti in the 17th century. With the adoption of Christianity by Aladag and his scions, the family was conferred with the princely rank and given several villages, such as Manavi, Tokhliauri, Kakabeti, and Kachreti, in possession by the kings of Kakheti. The princely possessions of the family were collectively known as Sacherkezo (საჩერქეზო).

There was another Cherkezishvili family in Kartli, the western neighbor of Kakheti, but of different origin and rank. Descending from a companion of George II of Imereti's Circassian bride Rusudan, they appeared in the Georgians lands in the 16th century and ranked as aznauri in Kartli.

== Notable people with the surname ==
- Elisabed Cherkezishvili (1864–1948), Georgian actress
- Varlam Cherkezishvili (1846–1925), Georgian aristocrat and journalist

== See also ==
- List of Georgian surnames
- List of Georgian princely families
