= Tornik =

Tornik may refer to:

== Places ==
- Tornik (peak), a mountain in Zlatibor, Serbia
  - Tornik ski resort
- Tornik, Ljubovija, a village in Mačva District, Serbia

== Other uses ==
- Tornike, a Georgian masculine given name
