= Tornike =

Tornike (Georgian: თორნიკე) is a Georgian masculine name that may refer to:

- Tornike Aptsiauri, Georgian football player
- Tornike Eristavi, Georgian general, monk and founder of the Iviron Monastery in Greece
- Tornike Gaprindashvili, Georgian footballer
- Tornike Gordadze, Georgian politician
- Tornike Grigalashvili, Georgian football player
- Tornike Gorgiashvili, Georgian football player
- Tornike Jalaghonia, Georgian rugby union player
- Tornike Kakhoidze, Georgian rugby union player
- Tornike Kapanadze, Georgian footballer
- Tornike Kipiani, Georgian singer
- Tornike Kvaratskhelia, Georgian football player
- Tornike Mataradze, Georgian rugby union player
- Tornike Okriashvili, Georgian football player
- Tornike Rizhvadze, Georgian politician
- Tornike Sanikidze, Georgian chess grandmaster
- Tornike Shengelia, Georgian basketball player
- Tornike Tsjakadoea, Dutch judoka of Georgian descent
- Tornike Zoidze, Georgian rugby union player
