= Salukvadze =

Salukvadze (Georgian: სალუქვაძე) is a Georgian surname. Notable people with the surname include:

- Lasha Salukvadze (born 1981), Georgian football player
- Nino Salukvadze (born 1969), Georgian sports shooter
- Tamriko Salukvadze (born 1991), Georgian football player
