= Liparteliani =

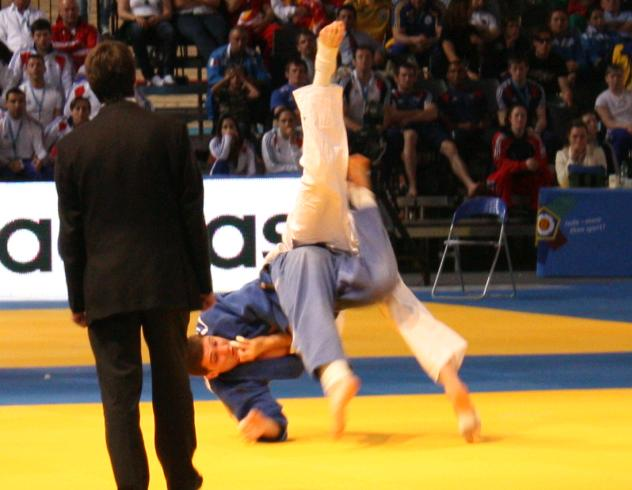
Varlam Liparteliani

Liparteliani (Georgian: ლიპარტელიანი) is a Georgian surname. Notable people with the surname include:

- Badri Liparteliani (born 1996), Georgian rugby union player
- Soso Liparteliani (born 1971), Georgian judoka
- Varlam Liparteliani (born 1989), Georgian judoka
