= Zhorzholiani =

Georgian family name

Zhorzholiani or Jorjoliani (Georgian: ჟორჟოლიანი) is a Georgian family name from the Svaneti region. Notable people with the surname include:

- Irakli Zhorzholiani (born 1987), Georgian politician and scientist
- Levan Zhorzholiani (born 1988), Georgian judoka
- Nanuka Zhorzholiani (born 1979), Georgian television host and journalist
