= Adamashvili =

Adamashvili (ადამაშვილი) is a Georgian language patronymic surname derived from the given name Adam. Notable people with the surname include:

- Beqa Adamashvili, Georgian blogger and writer
- Gigi Adamashvili, Georgian singer and musician
- Jemal Adamashvili, Georgian composer
- Mikheil Javakhishvili, birth name Adamashvili (1880–1937), Georgian and Soviet writer
