= Khomeriki =

Khomeriki (Georgian: ხომერიკი) is a Georgian surname. Notable people with the surname include:

- Levan Khomeriki (born 1974), Georgian footballer and manager
- Nikolay Khomeriki (born 1975), Russian film director and screenwriter
- Noe Khomeriki (1883–1924), Georgian politician
- Marianna Khomeriki (born 1997), Ukrainian journalist
