= Gotsiridze =

Gotsiridze (Georgian: გოცირიძე) is a Georgian surname. Notable people with the surname include:

- Beka Gotsiridze (1988–2026), Georgian footballer
- Revaz Gotsiridze (born 1981), Georgian footballer
- Rusudan Gotsiridze (born 1975), Georgian bishop
