= Janashia =

Janashia (Georgian: ჯანაშია) is a Georgian surname that may refer to:

- Davit Janashia (born 1972), Georgian footballer and coach
- Gigla Janashia (1927–2005), Georgian mathematician
- Konstantine Janashia (born 1990), Georgian strongman
- Nikoloz Janashia (1931–1982), Georgian historian and public benefactor
- Simon Janashia (1900–1947), Georgian historian and public benefactor
- Zaza Janashia (born 1976), Georgian footballer and coach
