= Melkadze =

Melkadze (Georgian: მელქაძე) is a Georgian surname. Notable people with the surname include:

- Georgi Melkadze (born 1997), Russian footballer
- Levan Melkadze (born 1979), Georgian footballer
- Razhden Melkadze (born 1983), Russian footballer
