= Alavidze =

Alavidze (ალავიძე) is a Georgian family name of Irano-Armenian origin.

The name takes its origins from Alavids (سلسله علویان طبرستان in Persian), Shia emirates based in Mazandaran (Tabaristan) of Iran. They were descendants of the second Shi'a Imam (Imam Hasan ibn Ali) and brought Islam to the south Caspian Sea region of Iran. After their defeat in 928 AD by Samanid empire Alavids dispersed into three main branches: the main brunch was absorbed into the conquering Samanid empire; second moved up north following the Caspian sea to present day Azerbaijan; the third branch took refuge in northern part of Armenia (what is now Dzoramut/Norashen territories). In order to accelerate the assimilation process, Alavids in Armenia changed their name to Alavian (Իրանահայ in Armenian, meaning sons/descendants of Alavids) and changed their religion to the Armenian Apostolic Christianity. Nevertheless, the assimilation process was not successful rendering persecuted Alavians to move up north to Georgia. At first Alavians occupied the southern part of Georgia (around Dmanisi region), but because of the incongruity with the local Georgian population were forced further up north finding refuge in the Southern Caucasus mountains (what is now Racha/Lechkhumi region). In somewhat isolation and comfort of the mountainous region Alavians, with fair ease, assimilated into the local Georgian peasantry by adapting local customs, religious practices, and changing their name yet again, adding suffix dze/ძე (Georgian for son/descendant of) to the root family name Alavid and thus becoming Alavidze.
