= Mamaladze =

Mamaladze (Georgian: მამალაძე) is a Georgian surname. Notable people with the surname include:

- Eka Mamaladze (born 1960), Georgian singer and pianist
- Giorgi Mamaladze, archpriest of the Georgian Orthodox Church convicted of attempted murder
- Zurab Mamaladze (born 1982), Georgian footballer
