= Rukhadze =

Rukhadze (Georgian: რუხაძე) is a Georgian surname. Notable people with the surname include:

- David Rukhadze (born 1963), Georgian footballer
- Irakli Rukhadze, Georgian businessman & political figure
- Irakli Rukhadze (footballer)
- Henri Rukhadze (1930–2018), Soviet and Russian physicist
- Tinatin Rukhadze, Georgian art critic and musicologist
