= Amaglobeli =

Amaglobeli (Georgian: ამაღლობელი) is a surname. Notable people with the surname include:

- Mzia Amaglobeli (born 1975), Georgian journalist
- Rati Amaglobeli (born 1977), Georgian poet and translator
