= Batiashvili =

Batiashvili may refer to:

- Lisa Batiashvili, a Georgian violinist
- Irakli Batiashvili, a Georgian politician
- Guram Batiashvili, a Georgian writer
