= Zoidze =

Zoidze (Georgian: ზოიძე) is a Georgian surname. Notable people with the surname include:

- Irakli Zoidze (born 1969), Georgian footballer
- Ramaz Zoidze (born 1996), Georgian Greco-Roman wrestler
- Tornike Zoidze (born 1996), Georgian rugby union player
