= Kakhidze =

Kakhidze (Georgian: კახიძე) is a Georgian surname. Notable people with the surname include:

- Aleksandr Kakhidze (born 1999), Russian-Georgian football player
- Aslan Kakhidze (born 1988), Kazakhstani freestyle wrestler
- Jansug Kakhidze (1935—2002), Georgian musician, composer, singer and conductor
- Marine Kakhidze (born 1983), Georgian footballer
- Otar Kakhidze (born 1983), Georgian politician and lawyer
- Vakhtang Kakhidze (born 1959), Georgian composer and conductor
