= Kutateladze =

Kutateladze (Georgian: ქუთათელაძე) is a Georgian surname. Notable people with the surname include:

- Apollon Kutateladze (1900–1972), Georgian and Soviet painter
- Guram Kutateladze (1924–1979), Georgian painter
- Guram Kutateladze (MMA fighter) (born 1992), Swedish-Georgian mixed martial arts fighter
- Natalia Kutateladze (born 1992), Georgian mezzo-soprano
- Nikoloz Kutateladze (born 2001), Georgian footballer
- Samson Kutateladze (1914–1986), Soviet physicist
- Samson Kutateladze (brigadier general) (1964–2018), Georgian businessman, politician, and military officer
- Semyon Kutateladze (1945–2025), Russian mathematician
