= Bakhsoliani =

Georgian-language surname

Bakhsoliani (Georgian: ბახსოლიანი) is a Georgian family name from the Lechkhumi region in north-western Georgia.

Bakhsoliani family name comes from these towns of Lechkhumi: Lajana, Orbeli, Chkhuteli and Tsageri. Presently, there are 272 Bakhsoliani family names in Georgia.
