= Topuria =

Topuria (Georgian: თოფურია) is a Georgian surname. Notable people with the surname include:

- Aleksandre Topuria (born 1996) Georgian-Spanish mixed martial artist
- Ilia Topuria (born 1997), Georgian-Spanish mixed martial artist, brother of Aleksandre
- Keti Topuria (born 1986), Georgian singer
- Tamaz Topuria (born 2002), Russian football player of Georgian descent
