= Kobakhia =

Kobakhia (Georgian: კობახია) is a Georgian-Abkhazian surname. It may refer to

- Valerian Kobakhia (1929–92), Soviet statesman and party leader.
- Batal Kobakhia (born 1955), Archeologists, Public figure.
- Aslan Kobakhia (born 1960), Vice Premier and Minister for Internal Affairs of Abkhazia
- Daur Kobakhia (born 1970), Chairman of the State Committee for Customs of Abkhazia
