= Kereselidze =

Kereselidze (Georgian: კერესელიძე) is a Georgian surname from Racha region of Georgia. Notable people with the surname include:

- Leo Kereselidze (1885-1943), Georgian general
- Archil Kereselidze, Georgian composer
- Jason Kereselidze (1891-1923), National Hero of Georgia
- Davit Kereselidze (born 1999), Georgian footballer
