= Sichinava =

Sichinava or Sitchinava is a Georgian surname. Notable people with the surname include:

- Anzor Sitchinava (born 1995), Georgian rugby union player
- Data Sitchinava (born 1989), Georgian footballer
- Giorgi Sichinava (born 1944), Georgian footballer
- Tengiz Sichinava (1972–2021), Georgian footballer
