= Abramidze =

Abramidze (Georgian: აბრამიძე) is a Georgian surname. Notable people with the surname include:

- Pavle Abramidze (1901–1989), Soviet major-general
- Kesaria Abramidze (1987–2024), Georgian blogger, actress and model
- Valeri Abramidze (born 1980), Georgian footballer
