= Gigla Janashia =

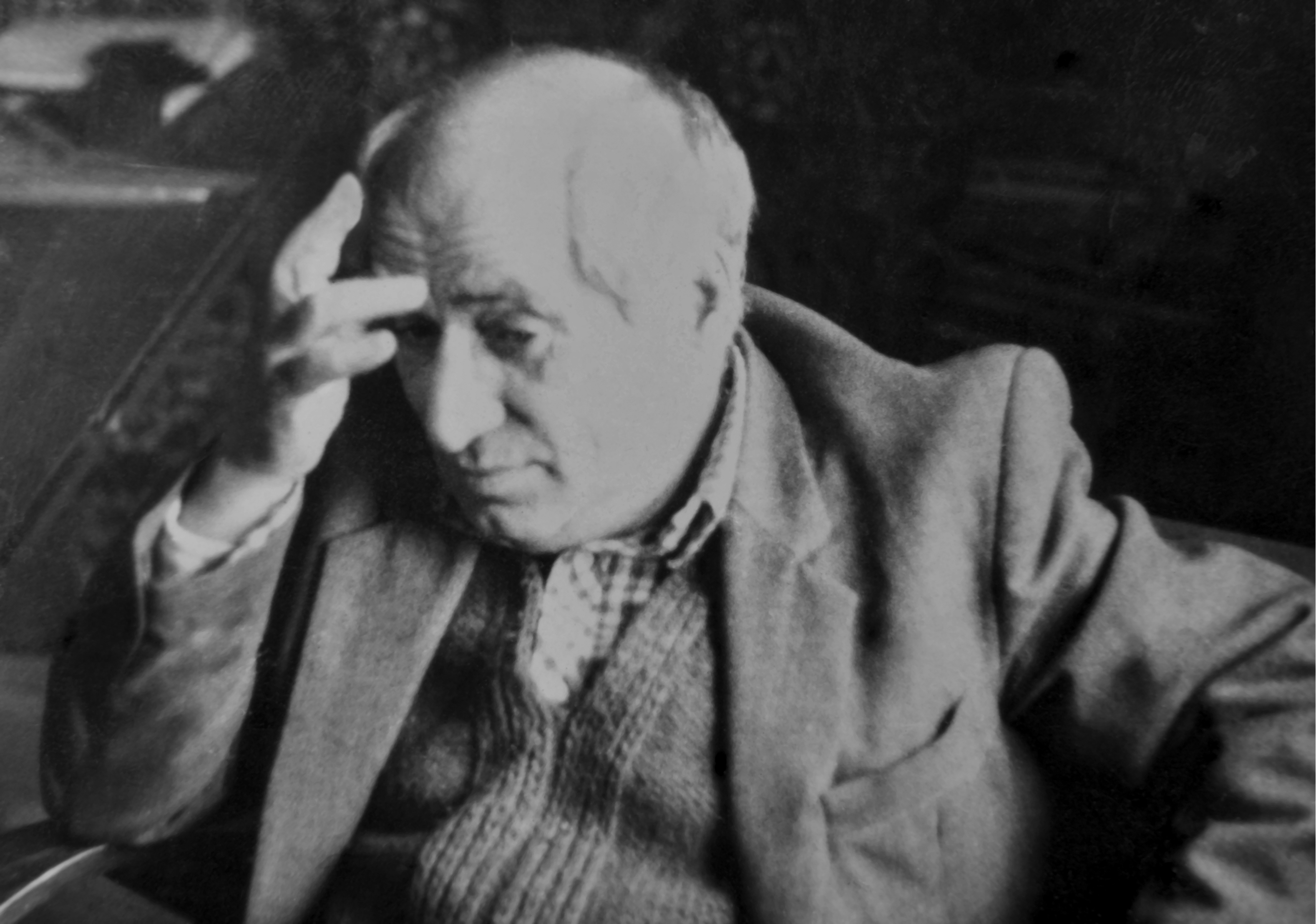
Gigla Janashia

Gigla Janashia (Georgian: გიგლა ჯანაშია; 27 September 1927, in Tbilisi – 27 April 2005) was a Georgian mathematician. He was the key author of Janashia-Lagvilava matrix spectral factorization (MSF) method. The major recognition of his achievements came after Janashia's death, when the USPTO granted the patent to this method and its applications, which is extremely rare for pure mathematicians.

== Education and academic life ==
Janashia graduated from the Mathematics Department of the Tbilisi State University in 1951 and continued his postgraduate studies at the Moscow State University. While being in Moscow in 1952-1955 he became popular among mathematician circles of his generation as a distinguished member of the Gelfand seminar. After returning in Georgia, Janashia continued research at the Razmadze Mathematical Institute, where he has established a thematic seminar on “Boundary Value Problems for Analytic Functions”. Janashia earned a Candidate of Science degree in 1965. He also actively participated to establish the Special Mathematical High School in Tbilisi, 1962. During his lifetime, Janashia published several important papers. He mentored a whole generation of young mathematicians at RMI including his doctoral students.

== Research achievements ==
A man of challenges, Janashia began investigating on possible improvements of the Wiener's matrix factorization method (also known as the Wiener-Hopf factorization or spectral factorization), having no guarantee that such improvements would even be feasible. He knew that such factorization was already highly used for major industrial applications in the West since the Wiener's time. Therefore, an essentially improved solution to the MSF problem would have a significant practical value. Due to the closed academic environment of the USSR, Janashia was not aware that many scientific groups, mostly engineers, had been working to improve the solution to the same problem in the West.

Along with a small group of graduate students, following around 15 years period of research efforts, during which he did not make a single publication, Janashia arrived at a general and remarkably simplified solution to the MSF problem. He only partially published his discovery due to the impossibility of acquiring any commercial rights of the invention in the recently collapsed Soviet Union. Initially, Janashia's solutions did not attract much attention in Western academics, since his approach was completely outside of the existing scholarly framework as well as not fully published. Regardless of the official support to his venture granted by famous mathematicians that have moved early to the West, such as S.P. Novikov and A.V. Skorokhod, Gigla Janashia died in 2005 without appropriate international recognition of his method.

== Ad mortem recognition ==
The major recognition of his achievement came after Janashia's death, when a patent application for an innovative method of MSF had been submitted via University of Maryland in 2009 and his papers appeared in respectable scientific journals. Namely the MSF became a decisive step in non-parametric estimations of Granger Causality, which is an important computational tool for neuroscientists in a study of the brain activity, including epilepsy-curing methods. The Janashia-Lagvilava-Ephremidze algorithm for MSF substituted existing Wilson’s MSF algorithm widely circulated in neuroscientist's community. The method can also be used to factorize specific matrices (non-rational, singular, large scale, depending on a parameter) which was not possible before in spite of the long history of the problem. Other modern applications of the algorithm in economics, control engineering and wireless communications are still under investigation.

Recently, the algorithm underwent an exponential acceleration, resulting in a dramatic increase in its processing speed and potential applications.
