= Tatishvili =

Tatishvili (Georgian: ტატიშვილი) is a Georgian surname. Notable people with the surname include:

- Anna Tatishvili (born 1990), Georgian-American tennis player
- Nodiko Tatishvili (born 1986), Georgian singer
- Tsisana Tatishvili (1939–2017), Georgian operatic soprano and educator
