= Geladze =

Geladze (Georgian: გელაძე) is a Georgian surname. Notable people with the surname include:

- Gela Geladze (born 1982), Georgian politician
- Aleksandre Geladze (born 1972), Georgian footballer
- Keke Geladze (1858–1937), mother of Joseph Stalin
