= Izoria =

Izoria may refer to:

== People ==
- Levan Izoria (born 1974), Georgian minister
- Nikoloz Izoria (born 1985), Georgian boxer
- Zviad Izoria (born 1984), Georgian chess grandmaster

== Places ==
- Izoria, Álava, a village in Ayala/Aiara municipality, Álava province, Spain

== See also ==
- Izora (disambiguation)
- Izhorians
