= Levan Mindiashvili =

Georgian visual artist

Levan Mindiashvili (Georgian: ლევან მინდიაშვილი) is a Georgian born New York based visual artist primarily interested in exploring a complex relationship between communal and private spaces.

His practice expands to sculpture, painting, installation and as the artist had put himself "all the possibilities in-between".

Levan Mindiashvili holds his BFA in sculpture from Tbilisi State Academy of Arts and had realized Post-graduate studies in Crossed Media at Buenos Aires National University of Art (IUNA). Among his awards are to be mentioned Commission Grant for Public Art Projects (FABLES) from National Endowments for Arts, New York 2014 and Emerging Artist of 2011, Movistar, Buenos Aires (2011).

His works had been exhibited in recent group exhibitions at the venues such as State Silk Museum, Tbilisi (Georgia); Georgian National Museum, Tbilisi (Georgia); Arsenal Museum, Kiev (Ukraine); Tartu Art Museum, Tartu (Estonia); The Lodge Gallery, New York, (USA); ODETTA, Brooklyn (USA);
