= Elisabed Cherkezishvili =

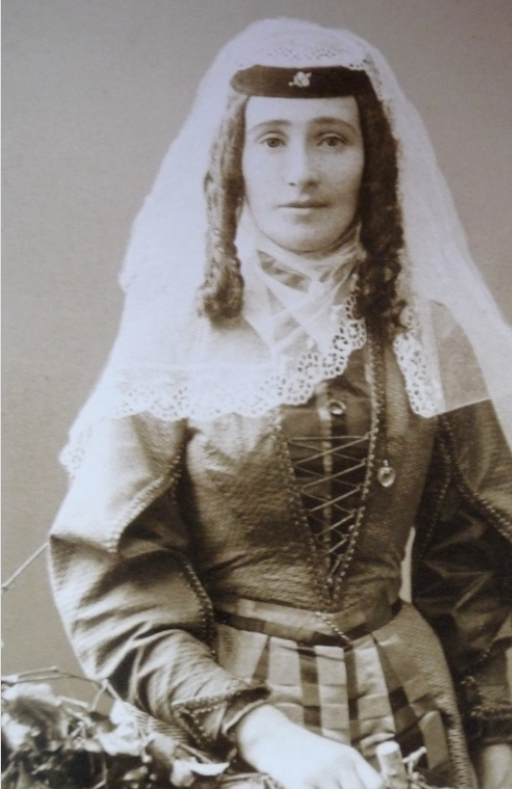
Elisabed Cherkezishvili

Elisabed Cherkezishvlili (Georgian: ელისაბედ ჩერქეზიშვილი; 1864–1948) was a Georgian theater and screen actress. Cherkezishvili entered the Tbilisi theatre troupe in 1886. Among her most popular roles were Khanuma in Khanuma, Elizabeth in First they Died, then They Wed, Tasia in Fate, the Betrayer, Isakhari in Betrayal, Ana Andreevna in "The Government Inspector", and Maia in "The Little Kakhetian". After the Bolshevik takeover of Georgia, Cherkezishvili worked at the Rustaveli Theatre (1921–24), the Kutaisi Theatre (1924–25), and the Marjanishvili Theatre (1930–48). In 1920–40 Cherkezishvili played a number of memorable roles in Georgian film, including the mother from "Arsena Jorjiashvili", Jupana ("Who is to Blame?"), Khanuma ("Khanuma"), the mother from "Two Hunters", Kneina ("Revolt in Guria"), the Tatar woman in "Meeting", the matchmaker from "Zhuzhuna's Dowry", the collective farmer from "Girl from the other Side", and Makari's mother from "Keto and Kote".

== Early life ==
Cherkezishvili was born on November 14 1864, in one of the royal families of Georgia. She was given an education by her father since childhood. She was forced to marry a Georgian prince who was much older than her. However, she escaped from the house to marry Niko Khizanishvili, who was Ilia Chavchavadze's lawyer. Ilia Chavchavadze was renewing the professional Georgian Theater, so Niko and Ilia supported Elisabed to start her career as an actress.

== Acting career ==
Cherkezishvili started her path as an actress in 1884 as an amateur actress in the village. In 1886 she started to work at Georgian Drama Theater. In this theater she performed her most memorable roles like: "Khanuma" "Elisabeth" and Ana Andreevna. From 1921 she first appeared on the screen and created memorable roles like "Mother" "Arsena Jorjiashvili", Jupana ("Who is to Blame?"), Khanuma ("Khanuma"), the mother from "Two Hunters", Kneina ("Revolt in Guria"), the Tatar woman in "Meeting", the matchmaker from "Zhuzhuna's Dowry", the collective farmer from "Girl from the other Side", and Makari's mother from "Keto and Kote". She played her last role in "Giorgi Saakadze". She had multiple awards including: People's actress award, Merit actress award, she was decorated with Lenin and Stalin orders. Because of her successful career and her strong character she became an idol for her younger generation of women actresses like Veriko Anjaparidze and Sesilia Takaishvili.

== Family ==
Her husband Niko Khizanishvili, was murdered in 1906. Her older son died in Moscow from tuberculosis, her younger son emigrated to France and her daughter Nuca was sent to Siberia prison by Soviet Government. Cherkezishvili raised her only granddaughter, Ekaterine Vachnadze, who followed her path of acting and became successful actress as well.

== Death ==
After the murder of her beloved husband and death of their son, Cherkezishvili began to experience heart problems, which worsened as she got older and in 1948 she died next to Marjanishvili theater when she was departing for her actress tour for Georgia. In her burial ceremony four women actresses held the coffin: Veriko Anjafaridze, Sesilia Takaishvili and two others.
