= Arabidze =

Arabidze (Georgian: არაბიძე) is a Georgian surname that means "Son of Arab". Notable people with the surname include:

- Giorgi Arabidze (born 1998), Georgian football player
- Meri Arabidze (born 1994), Georgian chess player
