= Razhden Melkadze =

Russian footballer

Personal information
- Full name: Razhden Rolandiyevich Melkadze
- Date of birth: 4 December 1983 (age 42)
- Height: 1.82 m (5 ft 11 1/2 in)
- Positions: Defender; midfielder

Youth career
- FShM Torpedo Moscow

Senior career*
Years	Team	Apps	(Gls)
2002–2003	FC Titan Moscow	46	(2)
2004	FC Arsenal Tula	5	(0)
2004	FC Dynamo Bryansk	21	(0)
2005	FC Arsenal Tula	25	(0)
2006	FC Oryol	20	(0)
2007	FC Smolensk	26	(2)
2008	FC Torpedo-RG Moscow	14	(0)
2008	FC Reutov	13	(1)
2009	FC Gubkin	17	(0)
2010	FC Pskov-747 Pskov	13	(0)
2011	FC Dnepr Smolensk	12	(1)
2012	FC Mostovik-Primorye Ussuriysk	0	(0)
2013	FC Sever Murmansk	4	(0)
- * Club domestic league appearances and goals

Razhden Rolandiyevich Melkadze (Russian: Ражден Роландиевич Мелкадзе; born 4 December 1983) is a former Russian professional football player of Georgian descent.

He played 2 seasons in the Russian Football National League for FC Arsenal Tula, FC Dynamo Bryansk and FC Oryol.
