= Khetsuriani =

Khetsuriani (Georgian: ხეცურიანი) is a Georgian surname. Notable people with the surname include:

- Irma Khetsuriani, Georgian wheelchair fencer
- John Khetsuriani (born 1951), Georgian lawyer
