= Gloveli =

Gloveli (Georgian: გლოველი) is a Georgian family name from the Racha region in the north-western Georgia.

The Gloveli family name comes from the towns of Oni and Shkmeri. Presently, there are 395 Gloveli family names in Georgia.
