= Kandelaki =

Kandelaki (Georgian: კანდელაკი) is a Georgian surname of early medieval Caucasus Greek Byzantine origin which may refer to:

- Ilia Kandelaki, Georgian footballer
- Georgi Kandelaki, Georgian boxer
- Tina Kandelaki, Russian journalist of Georgian origin
