= Kavtaradze =

Kavtaradze (Georgian: ქავთარაძე) is a Georgian surname. Notable people with this surname include:

- Beka Kavtaradze (born 1999), Georgian footballer
- Beka Kavtaradze (born 1990), Georgian water polo player
- Gia Kavtaradze (born 1970), Georgian politician
- Marija Kavtaradze (born 1991), Lithuanian film director and screenwriter
- Nodar Kavtaradze (born 1993), Russian footballer
- Sergey Kavtaradze (1885–1971), Soviet Georgian politician
