= Ioseliani =

Ioseliani or Iosseliani (Georgian: იოსელიანი) is a Georgian surname. Notable people with this surname include:

- Jaba Ioseliani (1926 – 2003), Georgian politician and military commander
- Nana Ioseliani (born 1962), Georgian chess player
- Platon Ioseliani (1810 – 1875), Georgian historian
- Otar Iosseliani (1934 – 2023), Georgian-French film maker
- Otia Ioseliani (1930 – 2011), Georgian writer
- Yaroslav Iosseliani (1912 – 1978), Soviet submarine commander
