= Kotrikadze =

Kotrikadze (Georgian: კოტრიკაძე) is a Georgian surname. Notable people with the surname include:

- Ekaterina Kotrikadze (born 1984), Georgian-Russian journalist and media manager
- Sergo Kotrikadze (1936–2011), Georgian-Soviet association footballer
