= Nanava =

Nanava (Georgian: ნანავა [nanava]) is a Georgian family name from the Samegrelo region in the western Georgia.

Nanava family name comes from these towns of Samegrelo: Zugdidi, Martvili, Taleri, Salkhino, Rukhi, Narazeni, Akhalabastumani, Didi Tskoni, Guliskari and Naesakao.
