= Tarielashvili =

Tarielashvili ტარიელაშვილი
- Country: Georgia, Russia
- Founded: 14th century
- Titles: Prince, Royal Aznauri

The House of Tarielashvili (Georgian: ტარიელაშვილი) is a Georgian Aristocratic family from Eastern Georgia, which also belonged to the Russian nobility.

== History ==
the family held the title of prince in the Russian Empire (Russian: Тариелашвили). The family were also titled as the Princes of Tambov (Russian: Тамбовские князья) and Royal Aznauris of Kakheti (Georgian: კახეთის სამეფო აზნაურნი). First family appear in the winery exchange document, dated back to 1693 year, where mentioned witness Mouravi Farsathan Tarielashvili. Family also included in the list of the Georgian nobility attached to the Russo-Georgian Treaty of Georgievsk of 1783. By decree of Tsar Nicholas II of Russian Empire, in 1915, Tarielashvili family received the princely title of the Russian Empire in the town of Tambov. According to the genealogical treatise by Prince Ioane of Georgia (1768–1830), the family came from region Anatolia. According to a family legend of the Tarielashvili, family descended from a Byzantine Greek noble of Anatolia, The ancestor of the family fled the Islamisation (Turkification) of Byzantine Empire and settled down in eastern Georgia, in the 14th century. His descendants being named as Tarielashvili, literally "the child of Darius/Dareios", after him.

== Gallery ==
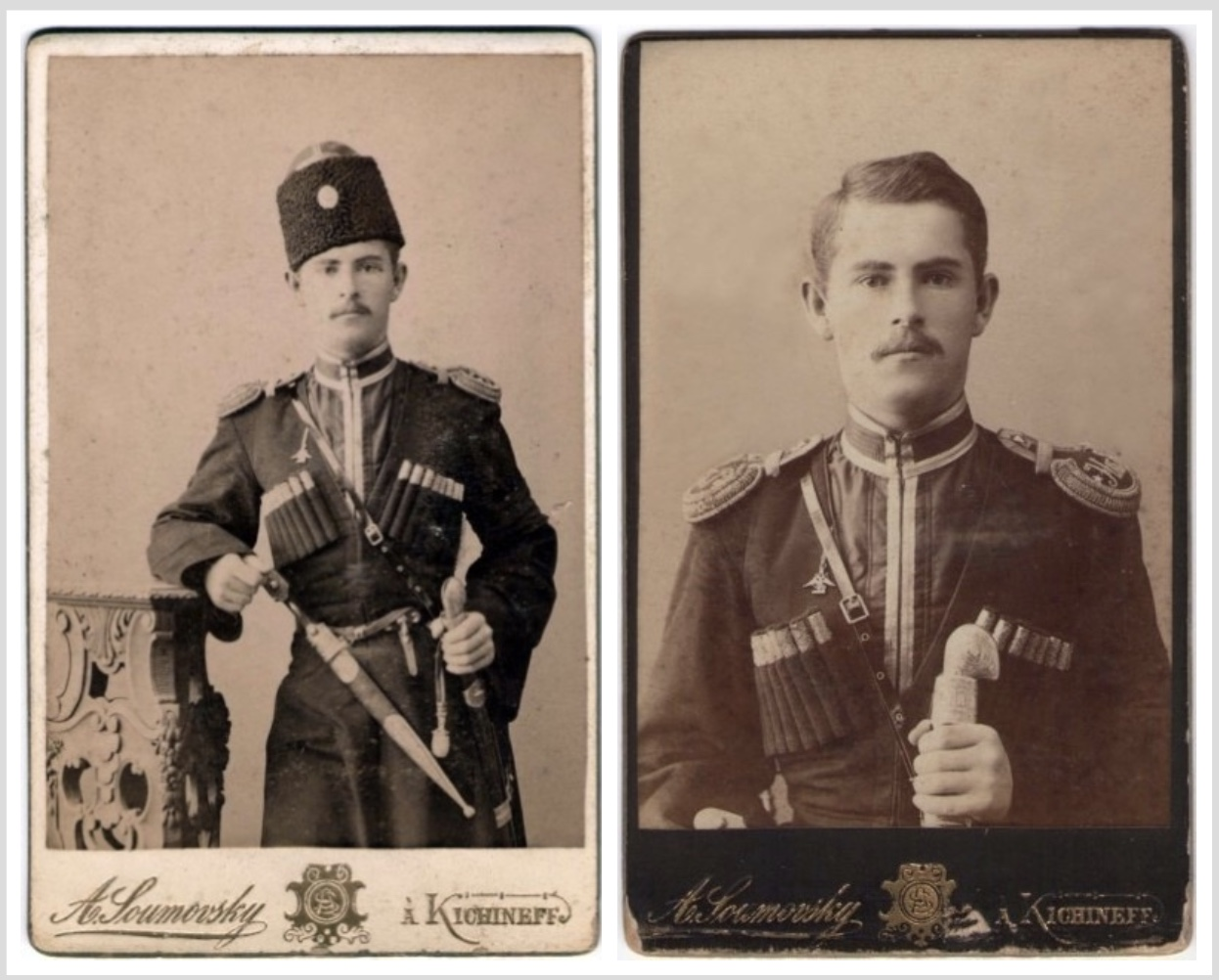
Aristocrat and sublieutenant Tarielashvili Georgy Nikolayevich.

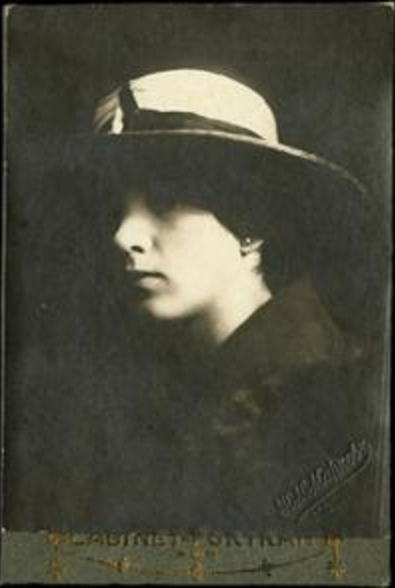
Aristocrat Tarielashvili Agafya Aleksandrovna.

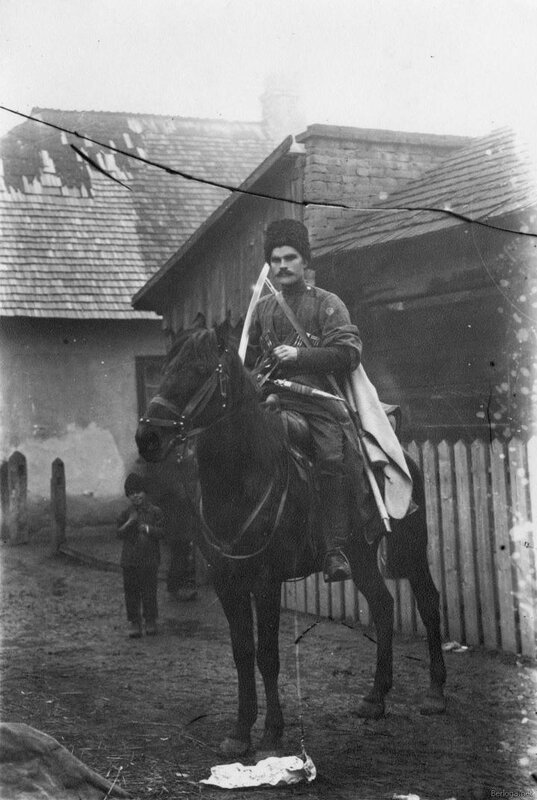
Cossack Aristocrat Tarielov (Tarielashvili) Ilya Georgyevich.

== Literature ==
- Prince Ioan Bagration, Brief description of princely and noble families in Georgia - TB, 1997.
- Winery exchange document of 1693.
