= Koridze =

Koridze (Georgian: ქორიძე) is a Georgian surname. Notable people with the surname include:

- Avtandil Koridze (1935–1966), Georgian Soviet wrestler
- Serhiy Koridze (born 1975), Ukrainian futsal player
- Vakhtang Koridze (born 1949), Georgian Soviet footballer
