= Balavadze =

Balavadze (Georgian: ბალავაძე) is a Georgian family name from the Imereti region in western Georgia.

The Balavadze family name comes from these towns of Imereti: Terjola, Kontuati, Kutiri and Ganiri.

Notable people with the surname include:

- Vakhtang Balavadze (wrestler) (1927–2018), Georgian wrestler
- Vakhtang Balavadze (politician) (born 1978), Georgian politician
