= Giorgi Mamaladze =

- Occupation: Archpriest (Georgian Orthodox Church)

Giorgi Mamaladze is an Archpriest of the Georgian Orthodox Church, currently serving a nine-year prison sentence for attempted murder.

Prior to his arrest in February 2017, he served as deputy head of the Patriarchate's Property Management Service and director general of the Patriarchate's medical center.

== Arrest and conviction ==
Mamaladze was arrested at Tbilisi International Airport on February 10, 2017, before his departure to Germany. At that time, the Catholicos-Patriarch Illia II was in a Berlin hospital for gallbladder surgery. According to the prosecution, police acted on an anonymous tip and found cyanide on his person and an "unregistered handmade firearm" at his residence. The prosecution did not name the intended victim, the Patriarch's secretary, until March 8.

Mamaladze's trial occurred behind closed doors, and recordings of the plot provided by the prosecution were not released to the public. On September 5, 2017, Mamaladze was found guilty of premeditated attempted murder and sentenced to nine years in prison.

Mamaladze's case has become the topic of infighting among the Patriarchate's hierarchy, with one archbishop (Chkondidi Metropolitan Petre) claiming that Mamaladze was innocent and prosecuted for exposing another archbishop's (Iakobi's) financial mismanagement. A letter obtained by Rustavi 2, purportedly from Mamaladze to the Patriarch, describes extensive corruption, fraud, and illegal alcohol production within the Church. A meeting of the Patriarchate's Holy Synod announced a request to President Salome Zurabishvili for his release in October 2019. Zurabishvili declined, saying there were no grounds for a pardon.

The Spectator cites the case as one of several Georgian judicial decisions "rife with controversy", noting, "A number of Church figures have claimed he was framed, and Mamaladze has maintained his innocence." The Human Rights Education and Monitoring Center published an assessment of the case which "points to serious procedural and substantive violations of law in the case, which, as a whole, constitutes violation of the right to fair trial and reveals the problem of manifestly weak substantiation of the charges in the court judgement."
