= Gigi Adamashvili =

Georgian musician and singer

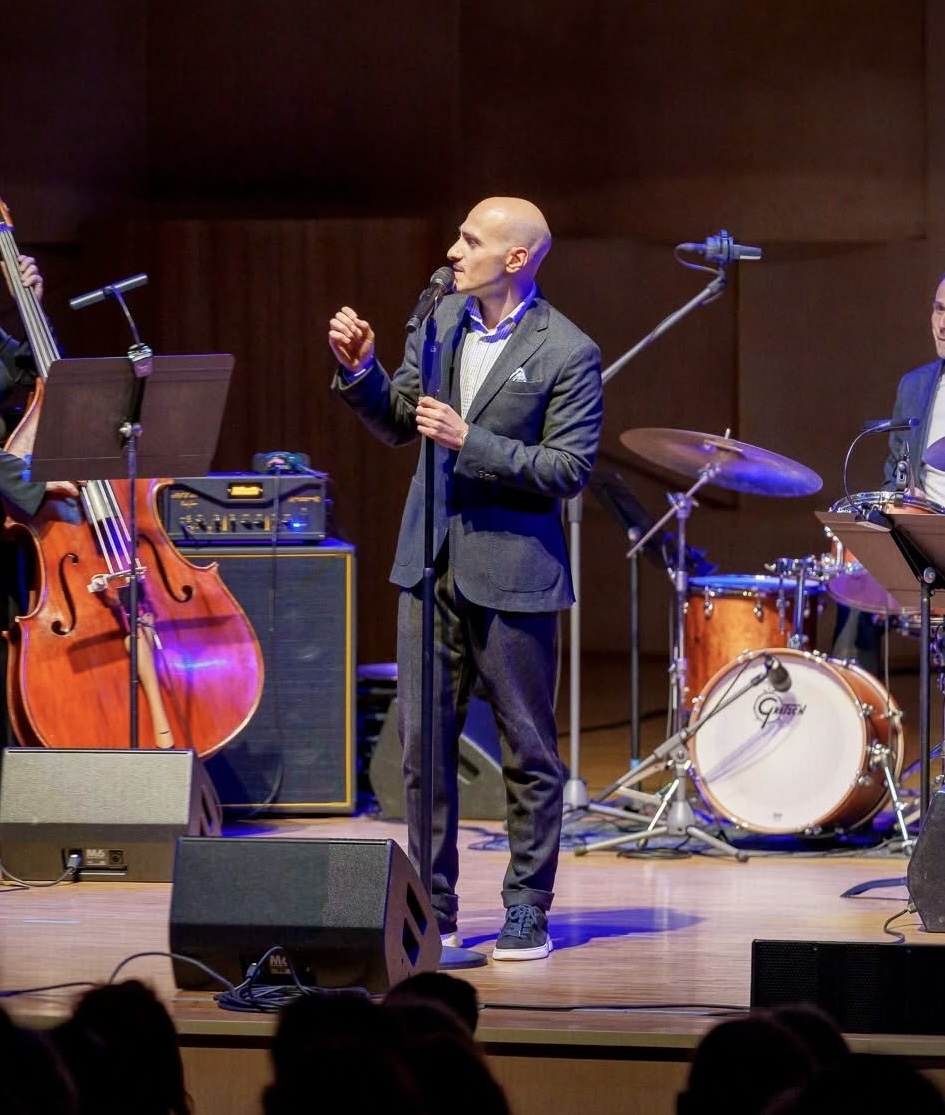
- Adamashvili at the Estonian Academy of Music and Theatre

Background information
- Born: 23 September 1998 (age 28); Tbilisi, Georgia
- Origin: Georgia
- Education: Tbilisi State Conservatoire, Estonian Academy of Music and Theatre
- Genres: Indie, Indie Folk, Jazz
- Occupations: singer-songwriter, musician
- Instruments: Vocal, guitar
- Years active: 2012–present
- Website: gigiadamashvili.com

Gigi Adamashvili (born 23 September 1998) is a Georgian singer-songwriter and musician. An award-winning artist, he released his debut studio album, Try Hard Fish, on 23 September 2026. The album combines elements of indie, acoustic music and jazz and was recorded in Tallinn, Estonia. It consists of eight main tracks and one bonus track.

== Early life ==
Gigi Adamashvili was born on 23 September 1998 in Tbilisi, Georgia. Adamashvili has been playing guitar since the age of eleven, after being taught by his mother. . He began his studies at the Tbilisi State Conservatoire, majoring in Jazz Vocal, and later continued at the Estonian Academy of Music and Theatre. Since 2023, he has been performing in the musical “I Will Swim Across the Sea” at the Vaso Abashidze New Theatre, playing the lead role — Bui.

=== 2015–2016 ===
In 2015, at age sixteen, Adamashvili participated in X-Factor Ukraine. He auditioned with the Bob Dylan song, "Make You Feel my Love" which has since accumulated over 2.5 million views on YouTube. In 2016, he entered X-Factor Georgia, auditioning with a cover of Wicked Game by Chris Isaak, reaching over 1.5 million views on YouTube. Mentored by Sofia Nizharadze, Adamashvili finished X-Factor Georgia 2016 in second place.

=== 2017–present ===
Adamashvili toured throughout Georgia in 2017, playing at 20 venues across the country over the course of three months. He won the Golden Wave Award after receiving 103078 votes from the public in 2018.
