= Nikolaishvili =

Nikolaishvili (Georgian: ნიკოლაიშვილი) is a Georgian patronymic surname derived from the given name Nikolai, 'Nicholas'. Notable people with the surname include:

- Guram Nikolaishvili, Georgian general
- Ramaz Nikolaishvili (born 1965), Georgian politician
- Tatuna Nikolaishvili, Georgian fashion designer
