= Tabidze =

Tabidze (Georgian: ტაბიძე) is a Georgian surname that may refer to the following notable people:

- Galaktion Tabidze (1892–1959), Georgian poet
- Jemal Tabidze (born 1996), Georgian football player
- Lasha Tabidze (born 1997), Georgian rugby union player
- Titsian Tabidze(1890–1937), Georgian poet
