= Chachkhiani =

Chachkhiani (Georgian: ჩაჩხიანი) is a Georgian surname. Notable people with the surname include:

- Mariam Chachkhiani (born 1995), Georgian singer
- Vajiko Chachkhiani (born 1985), Georgian artist
