= Apakidze =

Apakidze is a Georgian surname. Notable people with the surname include:

- Apakidze (noble family), noble family in Georgia
- Andria Apakidze (1914–2005), Georgian archaeologist and historian
- Timur Apakidze (1954–2001), Russo-Georgian naval aviator
