= Amiranashvili =

Amiranashvili (Georgian: ამირანაშვილი) is a Georgian language surname. According to forebears.io, most bearers of this name live in the nation of Georgia, which is thought to have 1,157 bearers in total.

Notable people with this surname include:

- Medea Amiranashvili (1930–2023), Georgian opera singer and teacher
- Shalva Amiranashvili (1899–1975), Georgian art historian
