= Khurtsidze =

Khurtsidze (Georgian: ხურციძე) is a Georgian surname. Notable people with the surname include:

- Avtandil Khurtsidze (born 1979), Georgian boxer
- David Khurtsidze (born 1993), Russian football midfielder
- Nino Khurtsidze (born 1975), Georgian chess player
