= Jeladze =

Jeladze (Georgian: ჯელაძე) is a Georgian surname. Notable people with the surname include:

- Gizo Jeladze (born 1975), Georgian footballer
- Zviad Jeladze (born 1973), Georgian footballer
