= Nemsadze =

Nemsadze is a Georgian surname. Notable people with the surname include:

- Georgi Nemsadze (born 1972), Georgian footballer and manager
- Giorgi Nemsadze (born 1984), Georgian rugby union player
- Oto Nemsadze (born 1989), Georgian singer
