= Chkhartishvili =

Chkhartishvili (Georgian: ჩხარტიშვილი) is a Georgian surname which may refer to:

- Luka Chkhartishvili, one of the Georgian horsemen in Wild West shows
- Grigory Chkhartishvili, known as Boris Akunin, Russian writer of Georgian origin
- Ivane Chkhartishvili, Georgian businessman
- Otar Chkhartishvili, Georgian naval officer
