= Mzhavanadze =

Mzhavanadze (Georgian: მჟავანაძე) is a Georgian surname that may refer to:

- Kakhaber Mzhavanadze (born 1978), Georgian footballer
- Vasil Mzhavanadze (1902–1988), Soviet politician, First Secretary of the Communist Party of the Georgian SSR in 1953–1972
