= Tsertsvadze =

Tsertsvadze (Georgian: ცერცვაძე) is a Georgian surname that may refer to:

- Aleksandr Tsertsvadze (born 1977), Georgian wrestler
- Gia Tsertsvadze, Georgian accused of committing murder and attempted murder in Russia in 2003
