= Chkonia =

Chkonia or Chqonia (Georgian: ჭყონია) is a Georgian surname. Notable people with the surname include:

- Lamara Chkonia (1930–2024), Georgian singer
- Temur Chkonia (in Georgian), CEO of Coca-Cola bottlers Georgia
