= Ordzhonikidze (surname) =

Ordzhonikidze or Orjonikidze (Georgian: ორჯონიკიძე) is a Georgian surname which may refer to:

== Ordzhonikidze ==
- Grigoriy Ordzhonikidze (better known as Sergo Ordzhonikidze) (1886–1937), Georgian Bolshevik and Soviet political leader
- Sergei Ordzhonikidze, Russian diplomat
- Lika Ordzhonikidze, Georgian model

== Orjonikidze ==
- Mindora Orjonikidze (1879—1967), Georgian politician
- Iza Orjonikidze, Georgian poet and politician
