= Gamsakhurdia =

Gamsakhurdia (Georgian: გამსახურდია) is a Georgian surname, formerly of a petite noble family, hailing from the province of Samegrelo. It may refer to:

- Giorgi Gamsakhurdia, major-general in Imperial Russian army
- Sergey Gamsakhurdia, major-general in Imperial Russian army
- Konstantine Gamsakhurdia (1893–1975), Georgian novelist, father of Zviad Gamsakhurdia
  - Zviad Gamsakhurdia (1939–1993), Georgian politician, first President of Georgia, son of the writer Konstantine Gamsakhurdia
    - Manana Archvadze-Gamsakhurdia Georgian pediatrician, activist and politician, spouse of Zviad Gamsakhurdia
    - Konstantine Gamsakhurdia (politician) (born 1961), Georgian politician, eldest son of Zviad Gamsakhurdia
    - Tsotne Gamsakhurdia, the second son of Zviad Gamsakhurdia
    - Giorgi Gamsakhurdia, Georgian government official, the youngest son of Zviad Gamsakhurdia
- Roman Gamsakhurdia, circus manager in Georgia and Russia
