= Badri Liparteliani =

- Born: 7 February 1995 (age 31) Tbilisi, Georgia
- Height: 1.77 m (5 ft 10 in)
- Weight: 80 kg (12 st 8 lb)

Rugby union career
- Position: Center
Senior career
Years	Team	Apps	(Points)
2014-	Rc Armazi	35	(30)
- Correct as of 18 May 2017
International career
Years	Team	Apps	(Points)
2014–2015	Georgia U20	3	(10)
2017	Georgia	1	(0)
- Correct as of 18 May 2018

Badri Liparteliani (born February 7, 1996) is a Georgian Rugby Union player. His position is Center and he currently plays for RC Armazi in Georgian championship. He was named in Georgia's squad for the 2017 Rugby Europe Championship. He made his debut against Spain.
