= Imedashvili =

Imedashvili (Georgian: იმედაშვილი) is a Georgian surname. Notable people with the surname include:

- Davit Imedashvili (born 1984), Georgian football player
- Lasha Imedashvili (born 1996), Russian football player
