= Sakandelidze =

Sakandelidze (Georgian: საკანდელიძე) is a Georgian surname. Notable people with the surname include:

- Karlo Sakandelidze (1928–2010), Georgian actor
- Zurab Sakandelidze (1945–2004), Georgian basketball player
