= Iosava =

Iosava (Georgian: იოსავა) – is a Georgian family name from the Samegrelo region in western Georgia.

Iosava family name comes from these towns of Samegrelo: Poti, Senaki, Khobi, Bia and Nojikhevi.
