= Shevardnadze (surname) =

Shevardnadze (Georgian: შევარდნაძე) is a Georgian surname, originally from the province of Guria. Notable people with the surname include:

- Dimitri Shevardnadze (1885–1937), Georgian artist
- Eduard Shevardnadze (1928–2014), Soviet and Georgian politician, son of Dmitri's cousin
- Nanuli Shevardnadze (1929–2004), Soviet and Georgian journalist and activist, wife of Eduard from 1951
- Sophie Shevardnadze (born 1978), Russian and Georgian journalist, granddaughter of Eduard
