= Kharaishvili =

Kharaishvili (Georgian: ხარაიშვილი) is a Georgian surname. Notable people with the surname include:

- Giorgi Kharaishvili (born 1996), Georgian footballer
- Giorgi Kharaishvili (rugby union) (born 1999), Georgian rugby union player
