= Lazarashvili =

Georgian patronymic surname

Origin
- Meaning: "son of Lazarus", "son of the one whom God helps"
- Region of origin: Georgia

Other names
- Variant form: Lazare

Lazarashvili is a Georgian language patronymic surname. The name consists of two parts: the suffix, "Shvili" (meaning "the child of" in Georgian); and the prefix "Lazar" (from a Jewish phrase "El Azar", which means "God Helps"), or from the masculine given name Lazarus, translated to Lazare in Georgian. The meaning of Lazarshvili could be interpreted as "son of Lazarus" or "Son of the one whom God helps".
