= Zamtaradze =

Zamtaradze (Georgian: ზამტარაძე) is a surname of Georgian origin. Notable people with the surname include:

- Georgi Zamtaradze (born 1987), Russian futsal player
- Tengiz Zamtaradze (born 1998), Georgian rugby union player
