= Irakli Zhorzholiani =

Georgian politician and scientist

Irakli Zhorzholiani (born March 25, 1987) is a young Georgian politician and scientist. Currently he works as a director at the LEPL Children and Youth Development Fund of the Ministry of Sport and Youth Affairs of Georgia. For three years he was an intern at the Committee on Foreign Relations of the Parliament of Georgia. A recipient of special commendation for excellent education he served as a board member and the Head of International Relations at the Political Coalition - "Georgian Dream" Youth Movement, which successfully challenged the ruling United National Movement in the Georgian parliamentary election, 2012 and finally won the elections.

As a board member of the youth movement Irakli Zhorzholiani played prominent role within pre – election activities and hereby was the Special Commission Secretary of elections in Afghanistan (Helmand Province) where Georgian soldiers together with coalition forces make significant contributions to defeat Taliban regime.

== Academic career ==
Born in 1987 in Tbilisi, he studied at Ivane Javakhishvili Tbilisi State University specialized in History of Diplomacy and International Relations and went to do his master's degree in Sweden. Currently he holds the master's degree in history with the focus on European Studies from Malmö University (Sweden) in cooperation with Roskilde University (Denmark).

Irakli Zhorzholiani holds special commendation for excellent education and is the author of several publications, including his book United States of America – the highest form of empire? New vision of World Historical Development. This book is the product of philosophy of history focused on completely different vision of world historical development. The author employs multidisciplinary approach to represent theoretical discourse regarding rise and fall of empires in contrast to modern American empire and about the phenomena of new world order as well.

Moreover, the book attempts to answer to macro-philosophical and historical questions based on the classical studies of history, philosophy, political and social sciences. Herewith debates, among scholars concerning the real nature of history is still underway. Nevertheless, historians were unable to give precise answer how the exact nature of history looks like. Consequently, the research has ambitions to clarify the exact nature of history and thus to solve this problem thoroughly.
