= Marianna Khomeriki =

Ukrainian journalist (born 1997)

- Маріанна Мерабівна Хомерікі
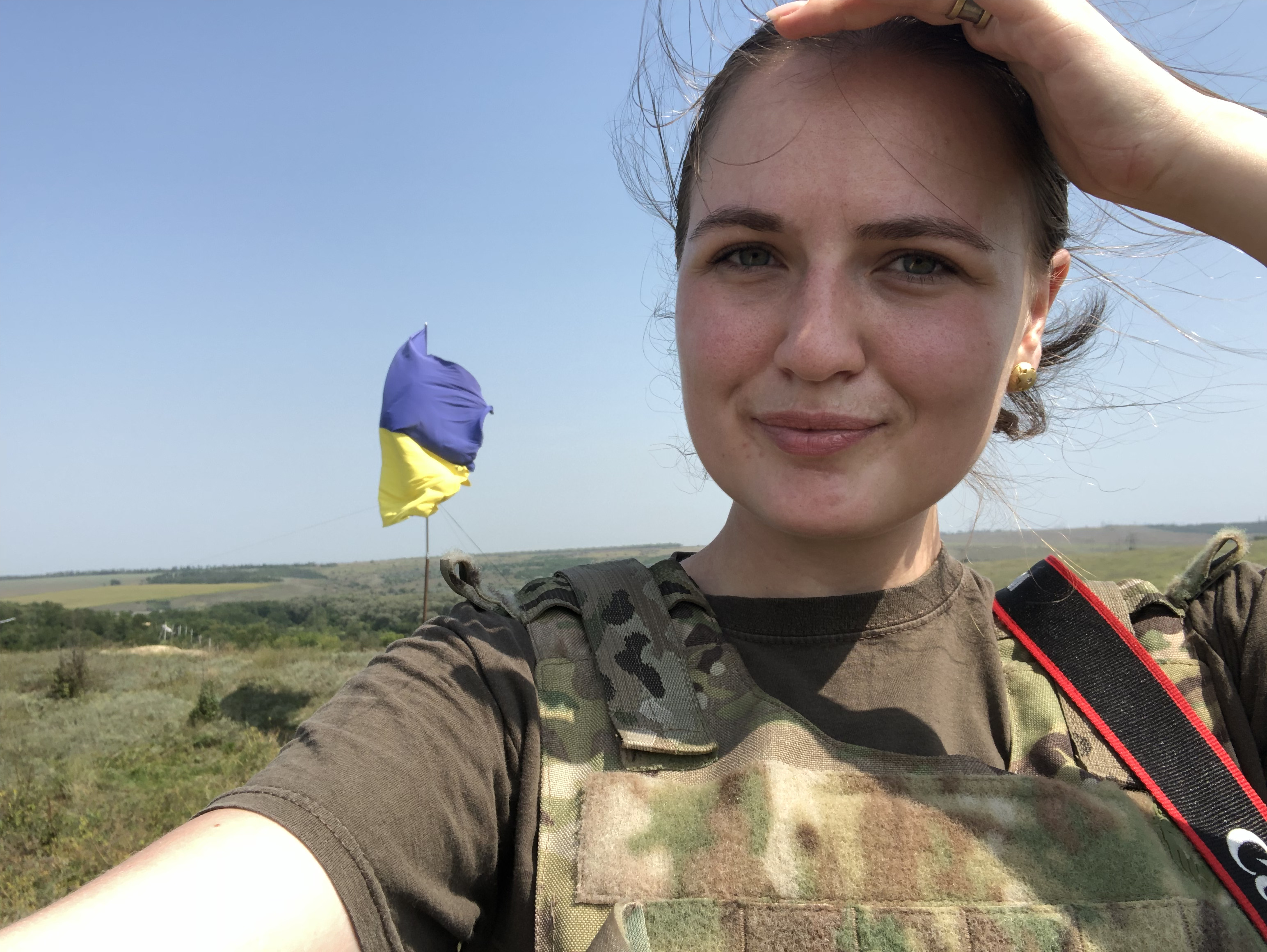
- Born: 29 April 1997 (age 29); Kyiv, Ukraine
- Education: Taras Shevchenko National University of Kyiv

Marianna Merabivna Khomeriki (Ukrainian: Маріанна Мерабівна Хомерікі; born 29 April 1997, Kyiv, Ukraine) is a Ukrainian communications specialist, servicewoman, Sergeant of "Azov" regiment of the National Guard of Ukraine, a combatant in Russia's war against Ukraine.

== Biography ==
Member of The Revolution of Dignity.

After the Maidan, joined the "Azov" battalion press service in Kyiv. Filmed the first volunteers' departures in 2014.

Completed studies on the Sociology faculty of the Taras Shevchenko National University of Kyiv.

In 2017 joined the press service of the "Azov" regiment in Mariupol, where she held the position of the unit's press secretary. At the same time, she became the main editor of the "National Defense" magazine, which has been published in Mariupol by the press service body and distributed among the various units of Ukrainian defense forces in the United Forces Operation region. In 2019 she signed the contract with "azovtsi" and completed the rotation at the Battle of Svitlodarsk. Completed a book titled "Shyrokin operation. Memories of the members of the offensive" (2016).

Starting from the end of 2019 to spring 2021 was heading the press service of the "Azov" regiment. In 2021 terminated the contract and returned to Kyiv, where she completed her studies at the Journalism Institute of Taras Shevchenko National University of Kyiv. Worked as an editor on Ukrainian TV.

In May 2022 asked "Kalush Orchestra" band to support "Azov" on the stage of the "Eurovision 2022" song contest.

Currently a co-founder of the Association of Azovstal Defenders' Families.

== Sources ==
- І. Поліщук, О. Суворов, Н. Кряж. Маріанна Хомерікі, пресофіцерка полку «Азов»: слова Редіса — зробити все, щоб витягти з неволі побратимів — для мене наказ!, TV-парк, 28 December 2022.
