= Otar Kakhidze =

Georgian politician

Member of the Parliament of Georgia
- Incumbent
- Assumed office 2016

Personal details
- Born: 7 July 1983 (age 43)
- Party: United National Movement (Before 2017); European Georgia (After 2017)

Otar Kakhidze (Georgian: ოთარ კახიძე; born 7 July 1983) is a Georgian politician and lawyer who is a European Georgia Member of the Parliament of Georgia. He is member of parliament since 2016. Educated at Tbilisi State University, graduated from the Faculty of Law. In 2005-2009 he was GYLA Project Assistant and Parliamentary Secretary. In 2009-2012 he was the Deputy Head of the Law Enforcement Department of the Ministry of Justice of Georgia, during this period he was the Head of the Analytical Department and the Deputy Minister of Justice of Georgia. In 2013 he gave lectures at Tbilisi Free University. In 2013-2016 he was the director of the company "BJI Legal". He has been a member of the Parliament of Georgia since 2016, in 2016–2017 with the mandate of the "National Movement", and since 2017 until today with the mandate of "European Georgia".
