= Rapava =

The Rapava (Georgian: რაფავა [rapʰava]) is a Georgian surname from the Samegrelo region in western Georgia.

The Rapava family name comes from these towns of Samegrelo: Zugdidi, Tsalenjikha, Kortskheli, Akhalkakhati, Rukhi, Tchkaduashi, Kakhati and Shamgona.
