= Machaidze =

Machaidze (Georgian: მაჩაიძე) is a Georgian surname. Notable people with the surname include:

- Goderdzi Machaidze (born 1992), Georgian footballer
- Manuchar Machaidze (born 1949), Georgian footballer
- Nino Machaidze (born 1983), Georgian opera singer
