= Tskitishvili =

Tskitishvili (Georgian: ცქიტიშვილი) is a Georgian surname. Notable people with the surname include:

- Avtandil Tskitishvili (1950–2013), Georgian general
- Gocha Tsitsiashvili (born 1973), Israeli Olympic wrestler
- Levan Tskitishvili (born 1976), Georgian footballer
- Maya Tskitishvili (born 1974), Georgian economist and politician
- Nikoloz Tskitishvili (born 1983), Georgian professional basketball player
