= Labadze =

Labadze (Georgian: ლაბაძე) is a Georgian surname. Notable people with the surname include:

- Gia Labadze (born 1973), retired Georgian rugby union player
- Irakli Labadze (born 1981), Georgian retired professional tennis player
