= Dzhugashvili =

Dzhugashvili or Jughashvili is a Georgian surname, a transliteration of ჯუღაშვილი. In Russian, it appears as Джугашвили.

Most famously, it is the birth surname of Joseph Stalin.

Other people with this surname include:

- Besarion Jughashvili (c. 1850–1909), father of Stalin
- Vasily Dzhugashvili (1921–1962), son of Stalin
- Yakov Dzhugashvili (1907–1943), son of Stalin
- Yevgeny Dzhugashvili (1936–2016), son of Yakov, and grandson of Stalin

According to some versions this surname is not of Georgian but of Ossetian origin and comes from Ossetian surname Дзугаты (Дзугаев in Russian form, Romanization Dzugaev) to which Georgian suffix -shvili ("son of") was added.
