= Levan Abelishvili =

- ლევან აბელიშვილი
- Born: 3 April 1909; Tbilisi, Russian Empire
- Died: 16 March 1974 (aged 64); Tbilisi, Georgian SSR, Soviet Union
- Occupation: Electrical engineering
- Awards: Order of Lenin

Levan Abelishvili (Georgian: ლევან აბელიშვილი; 3 April 1909 — 16 March 1974) was a Georgian electrical engineer.

== Early life ==
He was born on April 3, 1909, into a noble family in Tbilisi. His father, Gregory Abelishvili, was the head of the Transcaucasian railway. His mother, Antonina Abelishvili, became the first Georgian cinema actress when she starred in the title role in the 1918 movie Qristine, produced by Alexandere Tsutsunava.

In 1931, he graduated from the Transcaucasian Energy Institute.

== Career ==
He was a doctor of technical sciences (1955) and a professor (1956).

He was a pioneer of electric traction transport in Georgia and the USSR. His works deal with electric traction's efficiency, its calculation, the theory of rolling stock and electrical systems and the study of electrified railways' forced modes middle voltage drop by diagrams in the interaction of all elements, thermal design and testing of traction motors, heating theory of contact conductors, the calculation of inertial weight of long trains.

He was the founder of the Electric Vehicles department at the Georgian Technical University.

== Recognition ==
He was a corresponding member of the Georgian National Academy of Sciences of the Georgian SSR (1961), an honored worker of science and technology of Georgia (1967), and a member of the main editorial board of the Georgian Soviet Encyclopedia.
