= Akhalaia =

Akhalaia (Georgian: ახალაია) is a Georgian surname. Notable people with the surname include:

- Bacho Akhalaia (born 1980), Georgian politician
- Vladimir Akhalaia (born 1982), Georgian footballer
