= Rati Amaglobeli =

Georgian poet and translator (born 1977)

Rati Amaglobeli (Georgian: რატი ამაღლობელი; born 1977) is a Georgian poet and translator.

He studied Philology at the Tbilisi State University, until 2000. He has been publishing his poems in anthologies and magazines since 1994. His debut The Verb was released in 2000.

Amaglobeli is famous for his live performances, which made him a shooting star of contemporary poetry not only in Georgia. He read at the 2nd Moscow Festival of Poets. He was a host of the website www.azrebi.ge; a conference took place at the Ilia State University bookstore "Ligamus."

He also translated Goethe, Morgenstern, Nietzsche, Rilke, Tsvetaeva, Akhmatova and Brodsky into Georgian. He appeared on CD with Post Industrial Boys.

Since 2011, Rati Amaghlobeli has been the President of Georgian Pen Center.

Amaglobeli lives in Tbilisi.

== Works ==
- Tu January 2003
- Dges: Krebuli January 2003
- Zmna January 2000
