= Kurtanidze =

Kurtanidze (Georgian: კურტანიძე) is a Georgian surname. Notable people with the surname include:

- Eldar Kurtanidze (born 1972), Georgian wrestler
- Koba Kurtanidze (1964–2005), Soviet Judoka
