= Targamadze =

Targamadze (Georgian: თარგამაძე) is a Georgian surname. Notable people with the surname include:

- David Targamadze (born 1989), Georgian footballer
- Giorgi Targamadze (born 1973), Georgian journalist and politician
