= Adamia =

Adamia is a Georgian surname. Notable people with the surname include:

- Geno Adamia (1936–1993), German military commander
- Giorgi Adamia (born 1981), Georgian footballer
- Noah Adamia (1917–1942), Soviet sniper
- Tako Adamia (born 1994/5), Georgian beauty pageant titleholder
