= Guruli =

Guruli (Georgian: გურული) is a Georgian surname. Notable people with the surname include:

- Aleksandre Guruli (born 1985), Georgian footballer
- Gia Guruli (born 1964), Georgian footballer
