= Arziani =

Arziani (Georgian: Արզիանի) is a Georgian surname. The same word is in the Georgian name of Yalnızçam Mountains written as Arsiani. Notable people with the surname include:

- Malkhaz Arziani (1964–2022), Georgian footballer
- Zurab Arziani (born 1987), Georgian footballer, son of Malkhaz
