= Urushadze =

The Urushadze (Georgian: ურუშაძე) is a Georgian family name from the Guria region in western Georgia.

The Urushadze family name comes from these towns of Guria: Aketi, Atsana, Baileti, Bakhvi, Bokhvauri, Ganakhleba, Gvimralauri, Gurianta, Vakijvari, Tkhinvali, Lanchkhuti, Likhauri, Makvaneti, Mamati, Machkhvareti, Melekeduri, Nasakirali, Nigvziani, Nigoiti, Ninoshvili, Ozurgeti, Supsa, Kviani, Grmagele, Shemokmedi, Shroma, Shukhuti, Chaisubani, Chibati, Chochkhati, Tchanieti and Jumati.

== Notable members ==
- Andria Urushadze (born 1968), Georgian politician
- Ramaz Urushadze (1939–2012), Soviet Georgian footballer
- Zaza Urushadze (1965–2019), Georgian film director, screenwriter and producer
