= Nogaideli =

The Nogaideli (Georgian: ნოღაიდელი) is a Georgian family name from the Adjara region in the south-western Georgia.

The Nogaideli family name comes from these towns of Adjara: Alambari, Achkhvistavi, Batumi, Gantiadi, Dagva, Zeniti, Kakhaberi, Kvirike, Legva, Makhinjauri, Ochkhamuri, Salibauri, Sameba, Urekhi, Kakuti, Kobuleti, Chakvi, Tsikhisdziri, Tskhavroka, Tchakhati, Khabelashvilebi, Khelvachauri and Khutsubani.
