= Chiaureli =

Chiaureli (Georgian: ჭიაურელი) is a Georgian surname. Notable people with the surname include:

- Mikheil Chiaureli (1894–1974), Soviet Georgian film director
- Sofiko Chiaureli (1937–2008), Soviet Georgian actress, daughter of Mikheil Chiaureli
