= Gaprindashvili =

Gaprindashvili (Georgian: გაფრინდაშვილი) is a Georgian-language surname. It may refer to:

- Valerian Gaprindashvili (1888–1941), Georgian poet
- Nona Gaprindashvili (b. 1941), Georgian chess player, Grandmaster
- Valeriane Gaprindashvili (b. 1982), Georgian chess player, Grandmaster
- Tornike Gaprindashvili (b. 1997), Georgian association football player, midfielder
