= Dolidze =

Dolidze (Georgian: დოლიძე) is a Georgian surname that may refer to the following notable people:

- Ana Dolidze (born 1979), Georgian attorney and government official
- Anastasia Dolidze (born 1997), Russian pair skater of Georgian origin
- Gvantsa Dolidze (born 1990), Georgian football midfielder
- Roman Dolidze (born 1988), Georgian MMA fighter, European and world champion
- David Dolidze, Georgian mathematical physicist
- Grigol Dolidze (born 1982), Georgian footballer
- Roman Dolidze (born 1988), Georgian professional mixed martial artist
- Victor Dolidze (composer) (1890–1933), Soviet-Georgian composer
- Victor Dolidze (politician) (born 1973), Georgian diplomat and politician
