= Darchidze =

The Darchidze (Georgian: დარჩიძე) is a Georgian family name from the Adjara region in the south-western Georgia.

The Darchidze family name comes from these towns of Adjara: Adlia, Atchkva, Akhalsheni, Batumi, Gomarduli, Erge, Vani, Zanakidzeebi, Zemokhevi, Zesopeli, Tkhilnari, Kvatia, Kvirike, Kokotauri, Makhalakidzeebi, Makhinjauri, Nenia, Nigazeuli, Oladauri, Ochkhamuri, Sameba, Sakhalvasho, Skhepi, Kobuleti, Peria, Chanchkhalo, Chakvi, Tsikhisdziri, Tskhmorisi, Tchala, Tcharnali, Tchvana, Tsankalauri, Khelvachauri and Jalabashvilebi.
