= Yaakobishvili =

Daghim is a Georgian surname. Notable people with the surname include:

- Antal Yaakobishvili (born 2004), Hungarian football centre-back
- Áron Yaakobishvili (born 2006), Hungarian football goalkeeper
- David Yakobashvili (born 1957), Georgian businessman
- Temur Iakobashvili (born 1967), Georgian political scientist
- Zurabi Iakobishvili (born 1992), Georgian wrestler
