= Tamriko Salukvadze =

Georgian footballer (born 1991)

Personal information
- Date of birth: 9 February 1991 (age 35)
- Position: Midfielder

International career^{‡}
Years	Team	Apps	(Gls)
- Georgia
- ‡ National team caps and goals as of 23:51, 31 August 2019 (UTC)

Tamriko Salukvadze (born 9 February 1991) is a Georgian footballer who plays as a midfielder and has appeared for the Georgia women's national team.

== Career ==
Salukvadze has been capped for the Georgia national team, appearing for the team during the UEFA Women's Euro 2021 qualifying cycle.

== International goals ==
No.	Date	Venue	Opponent	Score	Result	Competition
1.	14 June 2019	Davit Petriashvili Stadium, Tbilisi, Georgia	United Arab Emirates	5–1	5–1	Friendly
