= Navrozashvili =

Navrozashvili is a Georgian surname which derives from the Persian Nowruz, which is the first day of the Iranian New Year, and also an (old-fashioned) Persian name. Navrozashvili may refer to:

- Zaza Navrozashvili (born 1992), Georgian rugby player
