= Guram Batiashvili =

Georgian writer and playwright

Guram Batiashvili (Georgian: გურამ ბათიაშვილი; born in 1938) is a Georgian writer and playwright. He was vice president of the World Jewish Congress and member of the General Council of the Euro-Asian Jewish Congress (EAJC).

At various times, Batiashvili has been and continues to be a member of the presidium and boards of the Writers’ Union of Georgia and of the Theatre Workers’ Union of Georgia. From 2003 to 2012, he was co-chairman of the World Congress of Georgian Jews (Tel Aviv). He is currently vice-president of the Georgia-Israeli Friendship Society. Since 1993, he has been the Editor in Chief of the Jewish newspaper "Menorah".

Batiahvili is the author of 15 books, including 4 novels. He is the author of several plays focusing on Jewish topics: The Debt (Repatriation of the Jews of Georgia to Israel in the 70s), Land or Homeland (Life of Theodor Herzl and his fight for the formation of Zionism), On the Eagle's Wings (Punishment of Adolf Eichmann), and The Beginning (The period of Judeo-Christianity, and the relations between Judaism and Christianity). His plays and novels have been translated into Russian and Hebrew.

He received several awards, including the Order of Honor, the State Prize of Georgia, and is an Honorary Citizen of Tbilisi.
