= Akhalkatsi =

Akhalkatsi (Georgian: ახალკაცი) is a Georgian surname. Notable people with the surname include:

- Roman Akhalkatsi (born 1980), Georgian footballer
- Nodar Akhalkatsi (1938–1998), Georgian footballer and coach
