= Nakani =

Georgian family name

Nakani (Georgian: ნაკანი [nakʼani]) is a Georgian family name from Svaneti region, in the north-western Georgia.

Nakani family name comes from these towns of Svaneti: Becho, Etseri, Latali, Lenjeri, Mestia, Natsuli and Ushkhvanari. Presently, there are 240 Nakani family names in Georgia.
