= Petriashvili =

Petriashvili is a Georgian surname literally meaning "son of Peter". Notable people with the surname include:

- Alex Petriashvili (born 1970), Georgian politician
- Geno Petriashvili (born 1994), Georgian wrestler
