= Chikhladze =

Chikhladze (Georgian: ჩიხლაძე) is a Georgian surname. Notable people with the surname include:

- Anzor Chikhladze (born 1949), Russian professional football coach and a former player
- Lado Chikhladze (born 1985), Georgian former professional tennis player
- Sandro Chikhladze (born 1965), Soviet equestrian
- Shalva Chikhladze (1912–1997), Soviet light-heavyweight wrestler from Georgia
