= Burchuladze =

Burchuladze is a Georgian surname which may refer to:

- Ermil Burchuladze, Georgian historian, Rector of Tbilisi State University (Sep. 1953 - Sep. 1954).
- Paata Burchuladze, Georgian opera bass and singer
- Tengiz Burchuladze, Georgian mathematician
- Zaza Burchuladze, Georgian dramatist and writer
