= Jishkariani =

Jishkariani, Dzhishkariani (Georgian: ჯიშკარიანი) is a Georgian surname. Notable people with the surname include:

- Gia Jishkariani (born 1967), Soviet and Georgian footballer
- Mikheil Jishkariani (born 1969), Georgian footballer
