= Garakanidze =

Georgian noble family

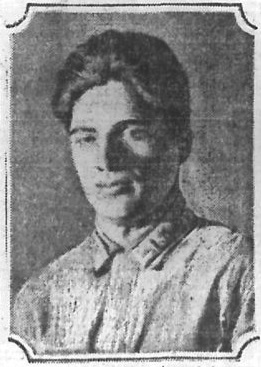
Vladimir Georgievich Garakanidze

The Garakanidze family (Georgian: გარაყანიძე, Russian: Гараканидзе), also known as Garaqhanidze, is a Georgian noble family (Royal aznauri) in Kartli and Kakheti kingdoms.

== History ==
Their ancestors were a ruling class of Ksani from early times. Members of the family were privileged to serve in Georgian Church diplomatic missions in Jerusalem in 13th century. The Garakanidze family was included in the list of nobles of Georgia in 1860 in the so-called Velvet Book (Russian: Бархатная книга.Родословная книга князей и дворян Российских и выезжих) published in Saint Petersburg.

The notable members of the family were also Georgi Luarsabovich Garakanidze (1866–1914/11/10), a colonel in the Imperial Russian Army, the company commander in 23rd Siberian infantry regiment; and his son Vladimir Georgievich Garakanidze is the first Soviet Airship-pilot and one of the designers of the first Soviet dirigible balloon USSR B-1.
