= Khujadze =

Khujadze (Georgian: ხუჯაძე) is a Georgian surname. Notable people with the surname include:

- Dato Khujadze (born 1975), Georgian singer
- Shalva Khujadze (born 1975), Georgian footballer
