= Alasania =

Alasania is a Georgian surname. Notable people with the surname include:

- Giuli Alasania, Georgian historian
- Irakli Alasania, Georgian politician and diplomat
- Mamia Alasania, Georgian military commander
