= Rekhviashvili =

Rekhviashvili (Georgian: რეხვიაშვილი) is a Georgian surname. It may refer to

- Aleksandre Rekhviashvili (born 1974), retired Georgian football player
- Giorgi Rekhviashvili (born 1988), Georgian football player
- Zebeda Rekhviashvili (born 1991), Georgian judoka
