= Gagua =

Gagua is a Georgian surname. Notable people with the surname include:

- Giorgi Gagua (born 2001), Georgian footballer
- Nikoloz Gagua (born 1975), Georgian politician
