= Khurtsilava =

Khurtsilava (Georgian: ხურცილავა) is a Georgian surname that may refer to:

- Inga Khurtsilava (born 1975), Georgian chess player with title of Woman Grandmaster
- Murtaz Khurtsilava (born 1943), Georgian footballer
- Theimuraz Khurtsilava (born 1979), Georgian boxer
- Besik Khurtsilava (born 1962), Georgian scientist
