= Mamulashvili =

Mamulashvili (Georgian: მამულაშვილი) is a Georgian surname. Notable people with the surname include:

- Giga Mamulashvili (born 1991), Russian former professional football player of Georgian descent
- Mamuka Mamulashvili (born 1978), Georgian paramilitary unit leader who currently commands the Georgian Legion
- Nona Mamulashvili (born 1977), Georgian political figure
