= Tabatadze =

Tabatadze (Georgian: ტაბატაძე) is a Georgian surname.

- Aleksandre Tabatadze (born 1969), Georgian politician
- Giorgi Tabatadze (born 2005), Georgian footballer
- Iuri Tabatadze (born 1999), Georgian footballer
- Toma Tabatadze (born 1991), Georgian footballer
