= Oniani =

The Oniani (Georgian: ონიანი) – is a Georgian family name from the Svaneti region in the north-western Georgia.

The Oniani family name comes from these towns of Svaneti: Gulida, Durashi, Zeskho, Tekali, Lakhamula, Lekosandi, Lemzagori, Lentekhi, Lenjeri, Luji, Mami, Mebetsi, Mele, Mestia, Mulakhi, Mutsdi, Natsuli, Jakhunderi, Rtskhmeluri, Sasashi, Sakdari, Tvibi, Panaga, Karishi, Kvedreshi, Shkedi, Chikhareshi, Chukuli, Tchvelpi, Khaishi and Khophuri.

== Notable members ==
- Tariel Oniani, Russian mob boss
- Giorgi Oniani, Georgian footballer
- Roin Oniani, Georgian footballer
