= Licheli =

The Licheli (Georgian: ლიჩელი) is a Georgian family name from the Kartli region in central Georgia.

The Licheli family name comes from these towns of Kartli: Agara, Atotsi, Akhmaji, Brodsleti, Gori, Didi Mejvriskhevi, Doesi, Tamarasheni, Tkviavi and Khashuri. Presently, there are 276 Licheli family names in Georgia.
