= Nutsubidze =

Nutsubidze (Georgian: ნუცუბიძე) is a Georgian surname. Notable people with the surname include:

- Giorgi Nutsubidze (born 1998) is a rugby union player
- Shalva Nutsubidze (1888 – 1969) was a Georgian philosopher, translator and public benefactor, one of founders of the Tbilisi State University
