= Abuladze =

Abuladze (Georgian: აბულაძე) is a Georgian surname. Notable people with the surname include:

- Ilia Abuladze (1901–1968), Georgian philologist
- Tengiz Abuladze (1924–1994), Georgian film director
