= Dzoramut =

Dzoramut Ձորամուտ
- Location within Armenia
- Coordinates: 41°11′59″N 44°17′24″E
- Country: Armenia
- Province: Lori
- Municipality: Sarchapet
- Elevation: 1,590 m (5,220 ft)

Population (2011)
  - Total: 281
- Time zone: UTC+4
  - Summer (DST): UTC+5

Dzoramut (Armenian: Ձորամուտ) is a town in the Lori Province of Armenia. In 1988-1989 Armenian refugees from Azerbaijan settled in the village.

== Demographics ==
58 people lived in the village in 1886, and 169 Muslims in 1897. 271 Turkish-Tatars lived here in 1922, 334 people in 1926, and 382 people in 1931.
