= Pirtskhalaishvili =

Pirtskhalaishvili (Georgian: ფირცხალაიშვილი; pierce-HULL-eye-SH-wee-lee) is a Georgian surname which may refer to:

- Joni Pirtskhalaishvili, Georgian lieutenant general
- Aleksandre Pirtskhalaishvili, Georgian historian

== Note ==
1. Also transliterated as Pircxalaishvili, Firtzkhalaishvili, Fircxalaishvili, Pirts Xalaishvili, Phirtskhalaishvili etc.
