= Chkhaidze =

Chkhaidze is a Georgian surname. Notable people with the surname include:

- Gennady Chkhaidze (born 1974), Georgian wrestler
- Gia Chkhaidze (born 1970), Georgian football player
- Giorgi Chkhaidze (born 1982), Georgian rugby union player
- Zaza Chkhaidze (born 1974), Georgian major general
