= Revazishvili =

Revazishvili (Georgian: რევაზიშვილი) is a Georgian surname. Notable individuals with this surname include:

- Giorgi Revazishvili (born 1977), Georgian footballer
- Giorgi Revazishvili (born 1974), Georgian judoka
