= Vladimer Apkhazava =

Georgian teacher (born 1976)

- ვლადიმერ აფხაზავა
- Born: January 9, 1976; Georgia
- Education: Batumi Cooperative Institute (Faculty of Economics)
- Occupation: Teacher
- Employer: Chibati Public School
- Known for: Civic education teaching, child welfare advocacy
- Awards: National Teacher Prize (2017); Global Teacher Prize Top 10 Finalist (2019)

Vladimer Apkhazava (born 9 January 1976) is a Georgian teacher.

In 1993 Vladimer Apkhazava finished Nigvziani secondary school. In 1999 he graduated from the Faculty of Economics of Batumi Cooperative Institute Cum Laude. Since 2010 he has worked as a teacher of Civiс Education at Chibati public school of Lanchkhuti Municipality. Starting from 2012 he has been managing a small family type house where eight orphaned children live.

On 5 October 2017, he was awarded the National Teacher Prize and became the first owner of this award.

On 13 December 2018, Vladimer Apkhazava was listed as one of the 50 best teachers of the Global Teacher Prize. On 21 February 2019, he was nominated among the world top 10 finalist teachers.
