= Beradze =

Beradze (Georgian: ბერაძე) is a Georgian surname and may refer to:

- Besik Beradze (born 1968), retired Georgian professional football player
- Rima Beradze (born 1955), Georgian politician
