= Aleksidze =

Aleksidze (Georgian: ალექსიძე) is a Georgian surname. Notable people with the surname include:

- Levan Aleksidze (1926–2019), Georgian jurist and expert on international law
- Rati Aleksidze (born 1978), Georgian footballer
- Zaza Aleksidze (1935–2023), Soviet armenologist
