= Balanchivadze =

The Balanchivadze (Georgian: ბალანჩივაძე) is a Georgian family name from the Imereti region in western Georgia.

The Balanchivadze family name comes from these towns of Imereti: Banoja, Didi Jikhaishi, Kukhi, Kvitiri and Tchkvishi.

The most notable member of the Balanchivadze family was George Balanchine, one of the 20th century's most famous choreographers, a developer of ballet in the United States and the co-founder and ballet-master of New York City Ballet.

== Notable members ==
- Meliton Balanchivadze, Georgian musician
- Andria Balanchivadze, Georgian composer
