= Razmadze =

Razmadze (Georgian: რაზმაძე) is a Georgian surname which may refer to:

- Andrea Razmadze, Georgian mathematician
- Bessarion Razmadze, Georgian fashion designer
- Levan Razmadze, Georgian judoka
- Luka Razmadze, Georgian footballer
