= Zhvania =

Zhvania (Georgian: ჟვანია) is a Georgian surname. Notable persons with that name include:

- Anna Zhvania (born 1970), Georgian politician
- Kakhaber Zhvania, (born 1983), Georgian boxer
- Lasha Zhvania (born 1973), Georgian politician
- Zurab Zhvania (1963–2005), Georgian politician
- Zurab Zhvania (born 1991), Georgian rugby union player
