= Bakradze =

Bakradze (Georgian: ბაქრაძე) is a Georgian surname. Notable people with the surname include:

- Akaki Bakradze (1928–1999), Georgian writer, literary critic and art historian
- Constantine Bakradze (1898–1970), Georgian philosopher
- David Bakradze (born 1972), Georgian politician
- Dimitri Bakradze (1826–1890), Georgian historian
- Zakaria Bakradze (1870–1938), Georgian-Polish military officer
