= Irakli Rukhadze (footballer) =

Georgian association football player

Personal information
- Date of birth: 28 October 1996 (age 30)
- Place of birth: Georgia
- Height: 1.81 m (5 ft 11 in)
- Position: Midfielder

Team information
- Current team: Dinamo Batumi
- Number: 17

Youth career
- Saburtalo

Senior career*
Years	Team	Apps	(Gls)
2013–2016	Saburtalo	43	(1)
2017	Merani Martvili	28	(6)
2018–2021	Telavi	105	(34)
2021	→ Samtredia (loan)	14	(3)
2022	Samgurali	30	(13)
2023–2024	AGMK	21	(3)
2023	→ Telavi (loan)	15	(6)
2025–	Dinamo Batumi	6	(0)
- * Club domestic league appearances and goals as of 31 May 2025

Irakli Rukhadze (Georgian: ირაკლი რუხაძე; born 28 October 1996) is a Georgian footballer who plays as an attacking midfielder for Erovnuli Liga club Dinamo Batumi.

Rukhadze was the 2nd best striker of the 2022 Erovnuli Liga season and Telavi's topscorer for three successive years.

== Career ==
Rukhadze started his professional career at Saburtalo in the 2nd division. Before making a debut for the club as a substitute in a home match against Chiatura on 3 November 2013, Rukhadze was called up by the national youth team management for 2014 UEFA European Under-17 Championship qualifiers. In 2015, Saburtalo earned promotion to the top league with Rukhadze scoring his first goal in a 5–2 away win over Merani Martvili on 23 April 2016.

Following a season-long tenure at Merani in 2017, Rukhadze joined Liga 2 side Telavi where he spent four memorable seasons. As Telavi achieved their historic promotion to the Erovnuli Liga next year, Rukhadze finished the season with 16 goals, becoming the third most prolific scorer of the league. He was named in symbolic teams of the 2nd division several times, including in July 2018, May 2019 and September 2019. Rukhadze displayed his goalscoring abilities in the top tier as well by becoming the team's main scorer both in 2020 and 2021. Apart from becoming a key player, he was selected by the Erovnuli Liga in Team of the League after the first half of the 2020 season.

Despite missing out on more than three months following a loan deal at Samtredia, Rukhadze still managed to top the scoring table at Telavi in 2021, making it three seasons in a row now. However, the sides did not extend the contract after this season, which paved the way for his departure for Samgurali. Rukhadze accelerated his scoring pace there, finishing not only as the team's best striker with 13 goals, but also as the 2nd best scorer of the league season behind Flamarion.

In early 2023, Rukhadze signed his first contract with a foreign club. After joining Uzbekistan Super League side AGMK, he became the only player in Samgurali's history who has been bought out. Later the same year, Rukhadze rejoined Telavi on loan and helped the team to solve their survival goal by scoring twice in playoffs.

Rukhadze was a member of the AGMK squad that came as runner-up of the 2024 Uzbekistan Super League. In February 2025, he returned to Georgia to play for two-time champions Dinamo Batumi.

== Statistics ==
As of match played 25 May 2025

Appearances and goals by club, season and competition
Club	Season	League			National cup		Continental		Other		Total	
Club	Season	Division	Apps	Goals	Apps	Goals	Apps	Goals	Apps	Goals	Apps	Goals
Saburtalo	2013–14	Pirveli Liga	11	0	–		–		–		11	0
Saburtalo	2014–15	Pirveli Liga	16	0	1	0	–		–		17	0
Saburtalo	2015–16	Umaglesi Liga	13	1	2	1	–		–		15	2
Saburtalo	2016	Umaglesi Liga	3	0	1	0	–		–		4	0
Saburtalo	Total		43	1	4	1	0	0	0	0	47	2
Merani Martvili	2017	Erovnuli Liga 2	28	6	–		–		1 (Note: Appearances in Erovnuli Liga playoffs)	0	29	6
Telavi	2018	Erovnuli Liga 2	35	9	4	2	–		–		39	11
Telavi	2019	Erovnuli Liga	35	16	1	0	–		2	0	38	16
Telavi	2020	Erovnuli Liga	16	5	3	1	–		–		19	6
Telavi	2021	Erovnuli Liga	19	4	–		–		–		19	4
Samtredia (loan)	2021	Erovnuli Liga	14	3	1	1	–		–		15	4
Samgurali	2022	Erovnuli Liga	30	13	1	0	–		–		31	13
AGMK	2023	Uzbekistan Super League	8	1	3	1	–		–		11	2
Telavi (loan)	2023	Erovnuli Liga	15	6	1	2	–		2	2	18	10
Telavi (loan)	Total		120	40	9	5	0	0	4	2	133	47
AGMK	2024	Uzbekistan Super League	13	2	3	2	–		–		16	4
AGMK	Total		21	3	6	3	0	0	0	0	27	6
Dinamo Batumi	2025	Erovnuli Liga	6	0	0	0	–		–		6	0
Career total			262	66	21	10	0	0	5	2	288	78

== Honours ==
=== Club ===
AGMK

- Uzbekistan Super League runner-up: 2024

=== Individual ===
Telavi

- Topscorer: 2019, 2020, 2021, 2023 (shared)

Samgurali

- Topscorer: 2022
