= Nada Kakabadse =

British academic

Nada K. Kakabadse is Professor of Policy, Governance and Ethics at Henley Business School, University of Reading. She has also published extensively on the subject of management and has worked as a consultant for a number of multinational corporations.

== Professional background ==
She holds a BSc in mathematics and computing, a graduate diploma in management sciences and a master's degree in public administration at the University of Canberra (Australia), and has earned her PhD in management at the University of Western Sydney - Nepean (Australia) Kakabadse has undertaken consulting work for a number of international organisations in Scandinavia and Europe, as well as in the Middle East and North Africa, and for several UK Government departments and the Canadian Federal Government. Her clients in the private sector have included Alliance & Leicester, Citigroup, Microsoft, Motorola, and Vodafone Australia. Her research into whether young people are becoming addicted to technology was covered by the mainstream media, including BBC News and SKY News. Kakabadse was elected as a member of the European Academy of Sciences and Arts in January 2013.

== Affiliations and awards ==
As of 2010, Kakabadse was the co-editor of the Journal of Management Development and editor of the Corporate Governance: the international journal of business in society. With her co-authors she won the William E. Mosher and Frederick C. Mosher Award for the best article written by an academic in the journal Public Administration Review (PAR) in 2003.

== Publications ==
- 2001: The Geopolitics of Governance
- 2006: Governance, Strategy and Policy: seven critical essays
- 2007: CSR in Practice: delving deep
- 2008: Elephant Hunters: chronicles of the money men
- 2008: Leading the Board: the six disciplines of world-class chairmen
- 2009: Global Boards
- 2010: Leadership in the Public Sector
- 2010: Rice Wine with The Minister: Distilled Wisdom to Manage, Lead and Succeed on the Global Stage
- 2011: Bilderberg People: Inside the Exclusive Global Elite
- 2012: Global Elites: The Opaque Nature of Transnational Policy Determination
