= Sukhishvili =

Sukhishvili is a Georgian surname. Notable people with the surname include:

- Iliko Sukhishvili, dancer, founder of the Sukhishvili Georgian National Ballet
- Levan Sukhishvili, prime minister of Georgian SSR in 1931
- Svetlana Sukhishvili, Russian and American polymer scientist
- Valeri Sukhishvili, founder of Sukhishvili University in Georgia
