= Maisuradze =

Maisuradze (მაისურაძე) is a Georgian surname. Notable people with the surname include:

- Grigol Maisuradze (1817–1885), Georgian painter
- Irakli Maisuradze (born 1988), Georgian footballer
- Irakli Maysuradze (born 2000), Georgian figure skater
- Miriani Maisuradze (born 1999), Georgian wrestler
- Nino Maisuradze (born 1982), Georgian-French chess player
- Nodari Maisuradze (born 1988), Russian pair skater of Georgian origin
