= Gamkrelidze =

Gamkrelidze is a Georgian surname. Notable people with the surname include:

- David Gamkrelidze, Georgian politician
- Revaz Gamkrelidze (1927–2025), Georgian mathematician
- Tamaz Gamkrelidze, Georgian linguist and orientalist
- Vladimeri Gamkrelidze, Georgian wrestler
