= Giorgadze =

Giorgadze (Georgian: გიორგაძე) is a Georgian surname which may refer to:

- Akvsenti Giorgadze (born 1976), Georgian rugby union player
- Andro Giorgadze (born 1996), Georgian football player
- Igor Giorgadze (born 1950), Georgian politician, Minister of State Security of Georgia. Charged with Eduard Shevardnadze's assassination attempt
- Ilia Giorgadze (born 1978), Georgian artistic gymnast
- Grigol Giorgadze (1879–1937), Georgian historian, jurist and politician
- Giorgi Giorgadze (born 1964), Georgian chess player
- Mirian Giorgadze (born 1976), Georgian Greco-Roman wrestler
