= Rusudan Gotsiridze =

Georgian bishop

- რუსუდან გოცირიძე
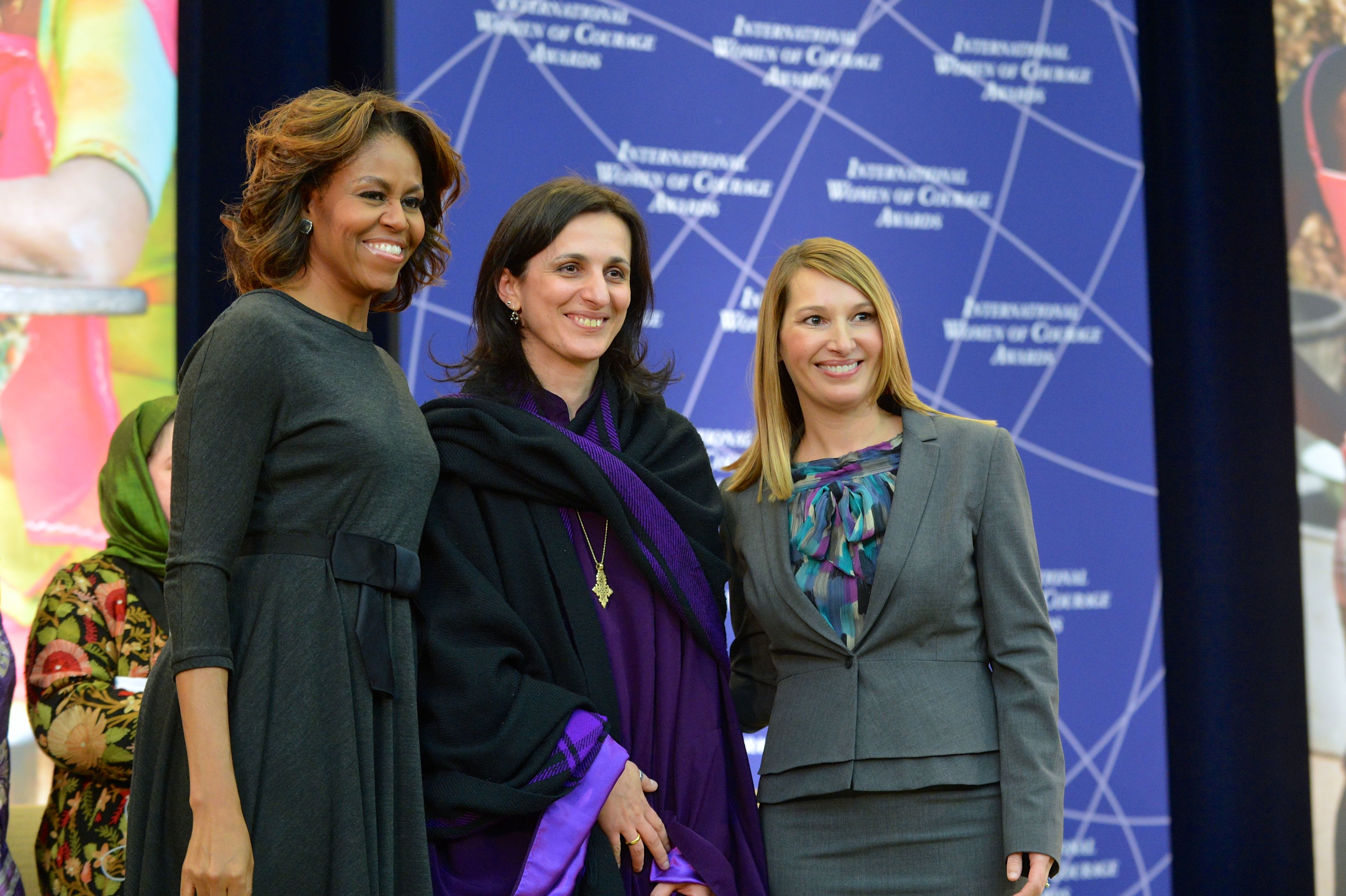
- Michelle Obama, Rusudan Gotsiridze and Heather Higginbottom
- Born: Rusudan Gotsiridze; 8 February 1975 (age 50); Tbilisi, Georgian SSR, Soviet Union

Rusudan Gotsiridze (Georgian: რუსუდან გოცირიძე; born 8 February 1975, Tbilisi, Georgian SSR, Soviet Union) is a bishop of the Evangelical Baptist Church of Georgia and a women's rights activist. She was the first female Baptist bishop in Georgia. She has advocated against gender violence and for women's equality, and created interfaith dialogues to support religious minorities. She was also one of the first members of the religious community in Georgia to publicly support the rights of the LGBT community. She also spoke at the 6th United Nations Forum on Minority Issues about religious minorities in Georgia.

She received a 2014 International Women of Courage award.
