= Kobakhidze =

Kobakhidze (Georgian: კობახიძე) is a Georgian surname. Notable people with the surname include:

- Aleksandre Kobakhidze (born 1987), Georgian football player
- Irakli Kobakhidze (born 1978), Georgian lawyer and politician
- Mamuka Kobakhidze (born 1992), Georgian football player
- Manana Kobakhidze (born 1968), Georgian lawyer and politician
- Mikheil Kobakhidze (1939–2019), Georgian screenwriter, film director, actor and composer
