= Abesadze =

Abesadze (Georgian: აბესაძე) is a Georgian surname. Notable people with the surname include:

- Inessa Abesadze (born 1940), Soviet and Georgian theater and film actress
- Nino Abesadze (born 1965), Israeli politician and journalist
