= Shengelia =

Shengelia (Georgian: შენგელია) is a Georgian surname that may refer to:

- Irakli Shengelia (born 1981), Georgian footballer
- Levan Shengelia (born 1995), Georgian footballer
- Mariam Shengelia (born 2002), Georgian singer
- Ramaz Shengelia (1957–2012), Soviet footballer
- Tornike Shengelia (born 1991), Georgian basketball player
