= Lobzhanidze =

Lobzhanidze or Lobjanidze (Georgian: ლობჟანიძე ან ლობჯანიძე) is a Georgian surname that may refer to:

- Mevlud Lobzhanidze (born 1968), Georgian judoka
- Nugzar Lobzhanidze (born 1971), Georgian footballer
- Saba Lobjanidze (born 1994), Georgian footballer
- Ucha Lobjanidze (born 1987), Georgian footballer
