= Tornike Zoidze =

- Born: 10 May 1996 (age 30) Tbilisi, Georgia
- Height: 1.95 m (6 ft 5 in)
- Weight: 112 kg (17 st 9 lb)

Rugby union career
- Position: Lock
Senior career
Years	Team	Apps	(Points)
2015-2016	ASM Clermont Auvergne	2	(0)
2017-	Academy	25	(5)
- Correct as of 18/07/2015
International career
Years	Team	Apps	(Points)
2014–2016	Georgia U20	12	(10)
- Correct as of 18/07/2015

Tornike Zoidze (Georgian: თორნიკე ზოიძე; born May 10, 1996) is a Georgian Rugby Union player. His position is Lock and he currently plays for RC Academy Tbilisi in the Didi 10 and the Georgia national U20 team.
