= Andrew Kakabadse =

British Academic

Andrew Kakabadse is professor of governance and leadership at Henley Business School, University of Reading and emeritus professor at Cranfield University School of Management. He has consulted and lectured in the UK, Europe, the US, SE Asia, China, Japan, Russia, Georgia, the Gulf states and Australia. He has also published 32 books, over 200 journal articles and 18 monographs. Andrew has held positions on the boards of a number of companies and has also been an adviser to a Channel 4 business series. He is currently embarked on a major world study of boardroom effectiveness and governance practice. A number of governments are participating in this new study, including British Ministers of State. He has been awarded a £2 million research grant to examine governance and leadership in the private sector and with governments.

== Professional background ==
In addition to being a professor of international management development at Cranfield University School of Management, Andrew is also currently visiting professor at the University of Ulster; visiting scholar in residence at Thunderbird School of Global Management, US; visiting professor at Macquarie Graduate School of Management, Australia; visiting professor at Swinburne University of Technology, Faculty of Business and Enterprise, Melbourne, Australia. He was also acting visiting professor at the Australian National University, Canberra, was visiting professor at Hangzhou University, China, was visiting fellow at Babson College, Boston, US, was honorary professorial fellow, Curtin University of Technology, Perth, Australia, and was the H Smith Richardson Visiting Fellow at the Center for Creative Leadership, North Carolina, US, October 2005 - 2006. Andrew is often sought out by media to comment on global business topics, most recently in The Times and Time magazine.

== Professional affiliations ==
Andrew is co-editor of the Journal of Management Development and Corporate Governance: The International Journal of Business in Society, and he sits on the editorial board of the Journal of Managerial Psychology and the Leadership and Organisation Development Journal. He is also a fellow of the International Academy of Management and Economics, fellow of the British Psychological Society and fellow of the British Academy of Management. He is ranked 14= in the HR Most Influential 2012 UK Thinker list. He is also ranked as one of the top 50 most influential management gurus in the world. Source: Harvard Business Review.

== Academic publications ==
- "The Elephant Hunters: Chronicles of the Moneymen" Published: 12 September 2008 ISBN 0-230-55369-9
- "Leadership Teams: Developing and Sustaining High Performance" Published 11 September 2009 ISBN 0-230-20190-3
- "Global Boards: One Desire, Many Realities" Published: 18 September 2009 ISBN 0-230-21212-3
- "Citizenship: A reality far from ideal" Published: 18 September 2009 ISBN 0-230-21666-8
- "Success in Sight: Visioning" Published: 1 August 1998 ISBN 1-86152-160-X
- "Working in Organisations" Published: 28 July 2004 ISBN 0-14-100163-1
- "Leading the Board: the Six Disciplines of World-Class Chairmen" Published: 23 November 2007 ISBN 0-230-53684-0
- "Intimacy: an International Survey of the Sex Lives of People at Work" Published: 1 January 2004 ISBN 1-4039-4324-9
- "Smart Sourcing: International Best Practice" Published: 21 December 2001 ISBN 0-333-96348-2
- "Designing World Class Corporate Strategies" Published: 14 December 2004 ISBN 0-7506-6368-5
