= Georgian diaspora =

The Georgian diaspora refers to both historical and present emigration from Georgia. The largest census-verified Georgian community outside Georgia is found in Russia. The Georgian diaspora, or the dispersion of Georgian people outside of Georgia, began to take shape during various historical periods. However, a significant wave of emigration occurred during the 19th and 20th centuries, particularly during times of political upheaval, such as the Russian Empire's expansion into the Caucasus region and the Soviet era.

== Geographic distribution ==
Country/territory	Ethnic Georgians (latest official)	Ethnic Georgians (low est.)	Ethnic Georgians (high est.)	People born in Georgia (of any ethnicity)	Citizens of Georgia
Russia	112,765 (2021 Russian census); 700,000 (2025 Georgian MFA unofficial estimate)		600,000–800,000; 1,000,000 (Georgian Union in the Russian Federation)	436,442 (2010 Russian census)	
Greece	200,000 (2025 Georgian MFA unofficial estimate)			43,272 (2017)	26,083 (2021)
United States	120,000 (2025 Georgian MFA unofficial estimate)			17,522 (2014)	9,767 (2017)
Turkey	90,000 (1965); 45,000 (2025 Georgian MFA unofficial estimate)	100,000–151,000	1,000,000–1,500,000		19,784 (2016)
Germany	50,000 (2025 Georgian MFA unofficial estimate)			18,000 (2017)	46,500 (2023)
Italy	50,000 (2025 Georgian MFA unofficial estimate)			14,585 (2017)	18,272 (2020)
France	35,000 (2025 Georgian MFA unofficial estimate)			16,700 (2019)	
Ukraine	34,200 (2001 census)			71,015 (2001)	
Spain	25,000 (2025 Georgian MFA unofficial estimate)			10,612 (2017)	11,078 (2017)
Belgium	25,000 (2025 Georgian MFA unofficial estimate)			530 (2017)	2,120 (2017)
Israel	20,000 (2025 Georgian MFA unofficial estimate)				
United Kingdom	10,000 (2025 Georgian MFA unofficial estimate)			2,187 (2013)	
Azerbaijan	9,900 (2009 census)				
Kazakhstan	4,990 (2009 census)				
Canada	4,775 (2016 census)			2,570 (2016)	
Belarus	2,400 (2009 census)				
Latvia	1,129 (2011 census)			1,289 (2017)	
Estonia	1,082 (2025)			910 (2017)	
Armenia	617 (2011 census)			49,322 (2011)	
Moldova	501 (2004 census)				
Lithuania	333 (2021 census)				
Austria				3,635 (2017)	3,406 (2017)
Czech Republic				1,765 (2022)	
Sweden				1,437 (2017)	
Ireland				1,180 (2022)	3,782
Switzerland				935 (2017)	
Australia				670 (2017)	
Poland				436 (2003)	10,000 (2021)
Portugal					490 (2022)
Brazil					438 (2025)
Norway				325 (2017)	
Hungary				302 (2017)	
Denmark				229 (2017)	
Luxembourg				98 (2017)	
Finland				91 (2017)	
Slovakia				85 (2017)	
New Zealand				60 (2014)	
Mexico				45 (2016)	
Slovenia				35 (2017)	
Iceland				25 (2017)	

== Notable people of Georgian descent ==
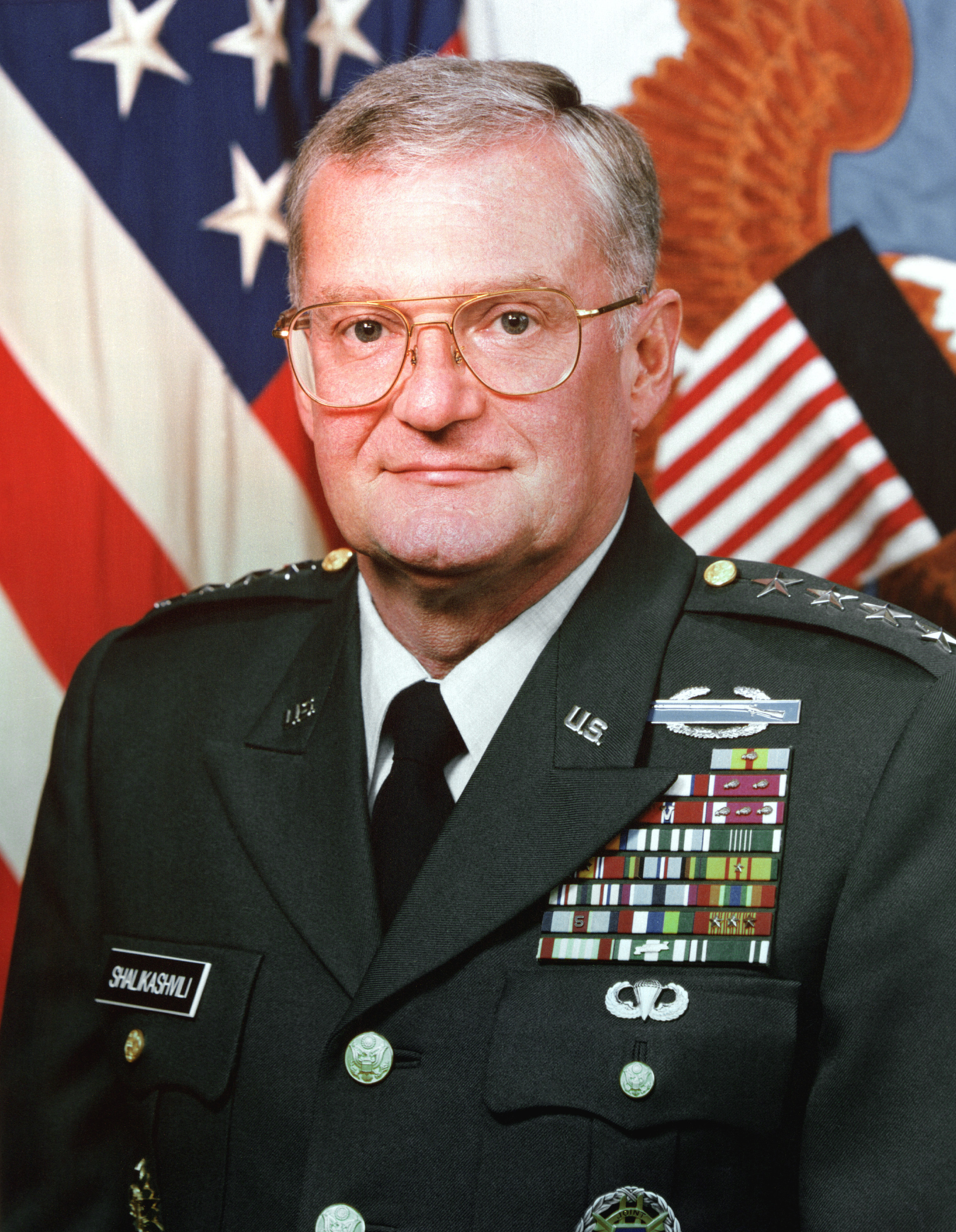
John Shalikashvili, a United States Army General who served as Chairman of the Joint Chiefs of Staff and Supreme Allied Commander from 1993 to 1997.

- David Bagration of Mukhrani, a claimant to the headship of the Royal House of Georgia and to the historical thrones of Georgia.
- Jorge de Bagration, a Spanish racing car driver of Georgian descent and a claimant to the headship of the Royal House of Georgia and to the historical throne of Georgia.
- George Balanchine, one of the 20th century's most famous choreographers.
- Paata Tsikurishvili, Founding Artistic Director & CEO of highly acclaimed Synetic Theater in Washington DC metropolitan USA 2001–present. synetictheater.org
- Irina Tsikurishvili, Founding Choreographer of Synetic Theater. Most celebrated choreographer in DMV region.
- David Baramidze, a Georgian-born German chess Grandmaster.
- Elena Botchorichvili, a writer
- David Chavchavadze, an American author and a former Central Intelligence Agency (CIA) officer of Georgian-Russian origin.
- Maryam d'Abo, an English film and television actress.
- Lasha Darbaidze, a Georgian-born American citizen who holds the positions of Honorary Consul of Georgia and President of the St. George Foundation.
- Anna Dogonadze, a Georgian-born German athlete.
- Nikolay Tsiskaridze, a Georgian-born Russian ballet dancer.
- Anna Chakvetadze, a Russian tennis player of partial Georgian descent.
- Anton Sikharulidze, a Russian figure skater of partial Georgian descent.
- Diana Gurtskaya, a Georgian-born Russian pop singer.
- Keti Topuria, a Georgian-born Russian pop singer.
- Georgi Dzhikiya, a Georgian-born Russian football player.
- Davit Chakvetadze, a Georgian-born Russian wrestler.
- Robert Mshvidobadze, a Georgian-born Russian judoka.
- Yago Abuladze, a Russian judoka of Georgian origin.
- Vernon Duke, an American composer and songwriter.
- Wachtang Djobadze, a Georgian art historian who lived in the United States as an émigré.
- Andrew Eristoff, a Republican Party politician from New York City who serves as New Jersey State Treasurer under Governor Chris Christie.
- Georgiy Gongadze, a Ukrainian journalist of Georgian origin who was kidnapped and murdered in 2000.
- Alex Greenwich, the member of the New South Wales Legislative Assembly seat of Sydney.
- Michael Gregor, an aircraft engineer of Georgian origin.
- Elly Heuss-Knapp, a German liberal politician and author.
- Tzipi Hotovely, an Israeli politician and member of the Knesset for the Likud party.
- Darren Huckerby, an English former professional footballer and academy coach.
- Alexander Kartveli, an influential aircraft engineer and a pioneer of American aviation history.
- María Katzarava, Mexican opera soprano of Georgian descent.
- David Koma, a Georgian born London based fashion designer.
- Vitaliy Kononov, a candidate in the 2004 Ukrainian presidential election, nominated by the Green Party of Ukraine.
- Kola Kwariani, a Georgian-American professional wrestler and chess player.
- Giorgi Latso, a Georgian-American classical pianist and composer.
- Georges V. Matchabelli, a Georgian nobleman and diplomat, who emigrated to the United States after the 1921 Soviet invasion of Georgia.
- Katie Melua, a Georgian-born British singer, songwriter and musician.
- George Papashvily, a Georgian-American writer and sculptor.
- Irina Shabayeva, the winner of the sixth season of Project Runway along with her model, Kalyn Hemphill.
- John Shalikashvili, a United States Army General who served as Chairman of the Joint Chiefs of Staff and Supreme Allied Commander from 1993 to 1997.
- Joseph Stalin (born Ioseb Besarionis dze Jughashvili), the de facto leader of the Soviet Union from the mid-1920s until his death in 1953.
- Tamta, a Greek pop singer famous in Greece and Cyprus.
- Omari Tetradze, a former football player of Georgian Greek descent who, during his playing career, represented Russia at international level.
- Jerzy Tumaniszwili, a Polish naval commander of a Georgian aristocratic descent.
- Ilia Topuria, a German-born Georgian former UFC champion of the world.
- Blaise Metreweli, a British civil servant of Georgian ancestry, and the current chief of the Secret Intelligence Service (MI6)

== Destinations ==
Map of the Georgian diaspora in the world (includes people with Georgian ancestry or citizenship). Georgia + 100,000 + 10,000 + 1,000

=== Europe ===
- Georgians in Belgium
- Georgians in France
- Georgians in Germany
- Georgians in Poland
- Georgians in Russia
- Georgians in Ukraine

=== North America ===
- Georgian Americans

=== Asia ===
- Georgians in Iran
- Georgians in Turkey

== See also ==
- List of Georgians
- History of Georgia
