= Georgians in Belgium =

Total population
- 1,000-2,000

Regions with significant populations
- Brussels, Antwerp

Languages
- Georgian, Russian, Dutch, French

Religion
- Georgian Orthodox Church

Ethnic Georgians in Belgium number between 1,000 and 2,000 and live mainly in Brussels and Antwerp.

From 2001, in Antwerp is St. Nino Georgian Orthodox Church.

From 2004, in Brussels is St. Tamar Georgian Orthodox Church.

The Georgians have their national dance schools in Brussels, Antwerp and Ostend.

== Notable Georgians who lived or were educated in Belgium ==
- Barbare Kipiani
- Nino Kipiani
