= Józefa Joteyko =

Polish child neurologist and psychologist

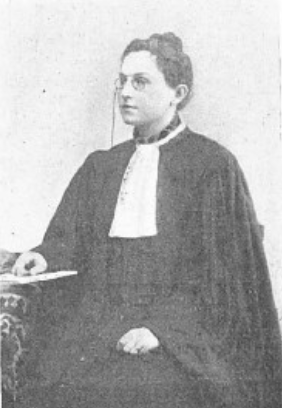
- Joteyko at her 1896 graduation
- Born: Józefa Franciszka Joteykówna; 29 January 1866; Poczujki, Kiev Governorate, Russian Empire
- Died: 24 April 1928 (aged 62); Warsaw, Second Polish Republic
- Other names: Jósefa Joteyko, Joséphine Joteyko
- Occupations: physician, scientist and academic
- Years active: 1896–1927

Józefa Joteyko (Polish pronunciation: [juˈzɛfa jɔtˈɛjkɔ]; 29 January 1866 – 24 April 1928) was a Polish physiologist, psychologist, pedagogue, and researcher. After completing her undergraduate studies at the University of Geneva, she entered medical school at the Free University of Brussels and completed her Doctor of Medicine in 1896 at the University of Paris. She opened a medical practice in France but decided two years later that she preferred research and moved back to Brussels. Operating as an assistant at the Solvay Institute of Physiology, she lectured and conducted research into muscle and nervous system fatigue.

Convinced that science could solve societal challenges, Joteyko expanded her research in order to study how science could improve the lives of workers while leading to improvements in industrial efficiency and productivity. This led her to conduct investigations on children, examining how educational facilities could optimize the potential of their students by drawing on scientific methodology. She served as president of the Belgian Neurological Society beginning in 1904 and received numerous awards for her research, including the Desmath Prize of the Imperial and Royal Academy of Brussels, the Dieudonnée Prize of the Belgian Royal Academy of Medicine. In addition, she was frequently recognized with prizes by the French Academy of Sciences. In 1916, Joteyko was appointed as the guest chair of the Collège de France, becoming the first woman to lecture at the institution.

Returning to Poland after the establishment of the Second Republic in 1919, Joteyko had difficulty finding full-time employment. She lectured at the National Pedagogical Institute and the National Institute of the Deaf in Warsaw and was later appointed director of the Pedagogical Institute until it was dissolved in 1926. She continued working, lecturing at the State Institute of Special Education and the Free Polish University, as well as serving on the committees of various governmental ministries as an advisor on employment and education. In 1926, she completed her post-doctoral degree at the medical faculty of the University of Warsaw, but illness curtailed her further involvement in research. She is considered to be one of the people who developed the schooling system in Poland.

== Early life ==
Józefa Franciszka Joteykówna was born on 29 January 1866 in Poczujki, Romanov volost of the Skvyra uezd in Kiev Governorate of the Russian Empire (today village of Pochuiky is located in Popilnia Raion, Zhytomyr Oblast). Her parents were Karolina (née Odrowąż-Kurzańska) and Lucjan Joteyko. Her family, which included a sister, Zofia, and two brothers Mieczysław and Tadeusz, was descended from landowning Lithuanian nobility and members of the Polish intellectual elite. She and her siblings grew up on the large family estate, but to improve their opportunities for education, the family moved to Warsaw in 1873, after leasing the property in Poczujki.

Joteyko began her studies with her mother and Madame Perosette, a French tutor. In 1876, the family moved to Smolna Street, near the Sierakowska Boarding School. Joteyko was enrolled there but only attended a for few months because her mother thought the instruction in sciences was inadequate. As the only other schooling option at the time was for Joteyko to attend a government school, which required assimilation of Russian culture, her mother organized private tutoring at home with Polish professors. After seven years of study, Joteyko prepared to take the examination to become a private teacher. Though she spoke four languages and passed her other tests, Joteyko did not pass the Russian language examination. Rather than retake it, she decided to continue her education abroad, as women were banned from studying at the University of Warsaw.

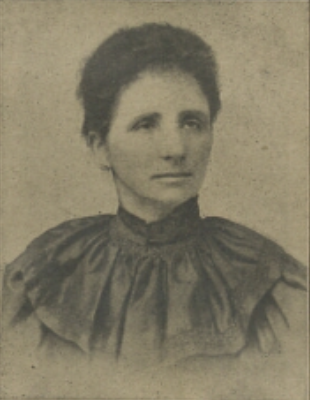
Michalina Stefanowska, 1909

Opting to go to Geneva, where her maternal uncle Zygmunt Miłkowski lived, Joteyko enrolled in the University of Geneva in 1886 to study physical and biological sciences. When she arrived in Switzerland, she cut her hair short, wore tailored dresses with a more masculine style, and was rumored to smoke. She met the former high school teacher, Michalina Stefanowska, with whom she established both a personal and professional relationship. After two years of study, Joteyko graduated with a Bachelor of Science degree and briefly returned to Warsaw. In 1889, she and her family moved to Brussels, where Joteyko entered the Faculty of Medicine of the Free University of Brussels.

Her father's illness forced the family to return to Warsaw in 1890. Joteyko did not return with them but instead moved to Paris, where Stefanowska was studying physiology. Within a few months, her father died and the family was threatened with bankruptcy. Joteyko left France briefly and went to Saint Petersburg to take the financial matters in hand. She was able to rescue some of the family capital and with her share, she returned to Paris and rented an apartment with Stefanowska. Enrolling in medical studies under Charles Richet at the University of Paris, Joteyko completed her Doctor of Medicine in 1896, receiving the faculty award for her dissertation "La fatigue et la respiration élémentaire du muscle" (Fatigue and elemental muscle respiration).

== Career ==
=== France and Belgium ===
For the next two years, Joteyko practiced medicine in Paris but found she disliked the routine. In 1898, she accepted an offer to move to Belgium, as an assistant at the Solvay Institute of Physiology. She also lectured on experimental psychology at the Casimir Laboratory of the New University of Brussels. In 1903, she became the director of the Casimir Laboratory and a protégée of Hector Denis. She published papers on physiology and her research into the effects of anesthesia by means of ether or chloroform on muscles, nerves, and the nervous system. Joteyko was particularly interested in muscle and central nervous system fatigue and increasingly worked on methods to quantitatively measure fatigue. Her scientific works were recognized with numerous honors, including a joint award in 1900 with Casimir Radzikowski for the Desmath Prize of the Imperial and Royal Academy of Brussels; a co-honor in 1901 with Stefanowska for the Dieudonnée Prize of the Belgian Royal Academy of Medicine and with Victor Pachon for the Montyon Prize of the French Academy of Sciences; and in 1903 co-honors with Paul-Émile Garnier and Paul Cololian for the Lallemand Prize of the French Academy of Sciences and the Monyton Prize with Stefanowska and Radzikowski.

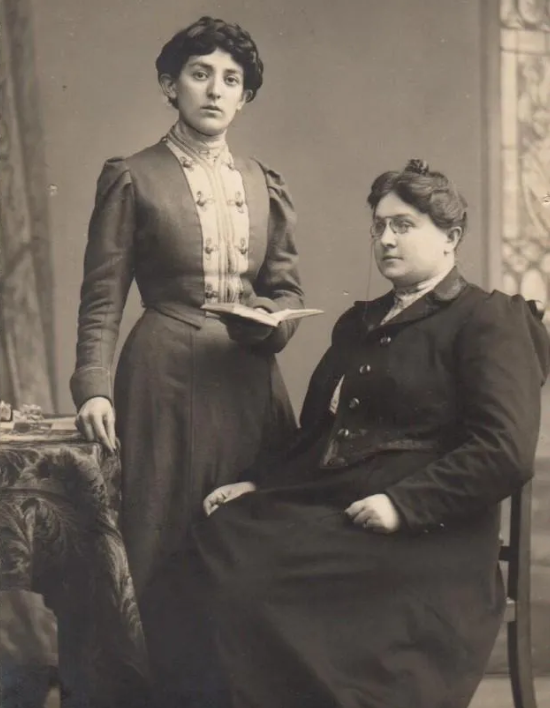
Józefa Joteyko (seated) and Varia Kipiani, 1910

In 1904, Joteyko became president of the Belgian Neurological Society and chaired the organization's congress in Liège the following year. In 1906, Stefanowska left Paris and returned to Poland, becoming headmistress of a girl's secondary school. Joteyko strongly objected to her partner leaving, but Stefanowska was tired of research and wanted to return to teaching. She convinced Joteyko, whom she referred to as her towarzyszka życia (life companion), (Note: Scholars on women's and LGBT history in Poland agree that inadequate investigation has been done into women's relationships at the turn of the 19th century. Very little is known of lesbian relationships. According to Iwona Dadej, there has been little written on the topic in Poland and researchers avoid the topic of women's friendships as not "worthy" enough to document. Relationships which today would be called "lesbian" rarely are labeled as such historically. Instead they are depicted as deep friendships with emotional bonds, which make it difficult to determine whether the couple who were joined in a Boston marriage had romantic attachments or simply lived together for mutually economic benefit. Dadej typifies those with a couple's relationship as those in which the women were life companions, sharing both professional and personal experiences. They organized themselves in a family structure, typically were single with no male guardian, and provided for their own economic support.) with the promise that they could write letters and visit each other. Though she continued to research physiology, Joteyko began lecturing on pedagogical psychology at teacher's seminars in Charleroi and Mons. In 1908, she founded and became editor of the Revue Psychologique, a journal which explored developments in the field of psychology from a scientific and educational perspective. Through her work there, she met and began collaborating with a young, Georgian scientist, Varia Kipiani, who served as a secretary to the Revue. The two women carried out joint research on vegetarianism, to which they both adhered and were awarded the 1908 Vernois Prize of the Académie Nationale de Médecine. Joteyko organized summer Paedological Seminars inviting international scholars to participate. Joteyko and Stefanowska published their last joint paper, "Psychophysiology of Pain", a synthesis of their studies on pain, in 1909.

Joteyko, along with social reformers in France and Belgium, believed that science could solve societal issues. She was a staunch feminist and believed that all fields of employment should be open to both men and women. Collaborating with Charles Henry, she sought to use scientific study and instruments to graph social phenomena and draw comparisons with biological data. By measuring and graphing, for example, physical and intellectual fatigue, Joteyko argued that military training would produce better results if limited to six months. In studies on workers, she concluded that industry could improve on efficiency and production, as well as the lives of workers, by evaluating the mental and physical fatigue factors involved in various tasks. She suggested basing pay on the effort required to accomplish a job, as a means of equalizing wages for various tasks, rather than basing pay on factors like gender. These studies led her to investigations on children and how educational facilities could apply scientific methods to improve and optimize the potential of their students.

In 1911, Joteyko organized and chaired an international Paedological Congress hosted in Brussels. The following year, she founded and developed the curricula for the International Paedological Faculty of Brussels. Kipiani came to work at the Faculty as a laboratory assistant. Learning of the work Joteyko was doing, Maria Grzegorzewska came to Brussels to study in 1913. Joteyko, who led the Faculty until World War I broke out, became a mentor to Grzegorzewska and was a significant influence on her scientific development. The two women developed a special friendship of mutual admiration and respect for each other and would remain life-long companions. The war interrupted her ability to continue with research and she turned instead to humanitarian work. Though she founded the Committee of Assistance for Poles Residing in Belgium, Joteyko left the country in 1915. She first joined Grzegorzewska in London and the two soon migrated together to Paris.

In 1916, Joteyko was appointed as the guest chair of the Collège de France. Her appointment marked the first time a woman had been allowed to lecture at the 386-year-old institution. Her first lecture was delivered on 24 January 1916. She also began lecturing at the Sorbonne and in 1918 lectured at the University of Lyon. She was awarded the Gagner Prize in 1916 and the Bellion Prize in 1918, both from the French Academy of Sciences; the Vernois Prize of the Académie Nationale de Médecine in 1917 and the Grand Prize Saintour by the Collège de France in 1918. As many Polish intellectuals and political figures had fled the country to avoid Germanization and Russification programs during the 123 years of the Partitions of Poland, the war offered a chance to Polish nationals to restore their state as an independent nation. These exiled Poles began gathering materials abroad that they would need to develop institutions in an independent Poland. In 1918, she and Grzegorzewska founded the Polish Teaching League (Ligue Polonaise d'Enseignement, Polska Liga Nauczania) with the purpose of helping collect materials on education and teaching methodology.

=== Return to Poland ===
Unable to gain full-time employment, in 1919 Joteyko returned to Poland with Grzegorzewska soon after the Second Republic was established. She applied to the University of Warsaw to chair the experimental psychology department, but was rejected. Joteyko believed that the rejection was caused by an aversion to women in Polish scientific circles, as well as the fact that she lived with long-term female partners. Grzegorzewska, who had found employment with the Ministry of Religious Affairs and Public Enlightenment to manage special education development for schools, institutions and educators, helped Joteyko find work as a lecturer at the Państwowy Instytut Pedagogiczny (National Pedagogical Institute) and National Institute of the Deaf in Warsaw. A year later, Joteyko was offered the chair of the General and Pedagogical Psychology Department at the Institute. She brought her private laboratory equipment from Brussels to establish the workshop for the Pedagogical Institute. Using various instruments, she taught her students to measure fine motor skills, rates of reaction to stimuli, and spatial orientation, as well as analyzing psychological results from such examinations as the Binet-Simon intelligence, Otis mental-ability, and Stanford educational tests.

In 1921, Joteyko joined the editorial committee of the Rocznik Pedagogiczny (Pedagogical Yearbook) and the following year was appointed as vice-chair of the Pedagogical Commission for the Ministry of Religious Affairs and Public Enlightenment. At the time, there was no unified educational standard for school systems in Poland and the facilities that existed favored the upper classes. Lobbying for universal education, Joteyko suggested free schooling for impoverished or rural students and a scholarship system for gifted students. In her opinion, no matter their financial situation, pupils needed to be able to learn so that society would benefit from their education and skill. She recommended mandatory schooling for all students until the age of 14 when aptitude tests would be used to determine a university or vocational path. Recognizing that developmental levels varied for students over time, she advocated a second aptitude test at 18. Noting that students attending craft schools tended to be locked into certain trades, she stressed that all teachers should be adequately trained to provide basic education, as well as training in a trade. This would allow vocational students to change the direction of their professional specializations, and thereby create more qualified workers.

In her quest to democratize education and dismantle class biases, Joteyko advocated for special education courses and institutions which taught students with disabilities. She pressed for the creation of schools which addressed their particular needs and allowed students to achieve the maximum education under conditions suitable to their mental abilities. She stressed that schools should be secular, believing that religion was a matter of personal preference and its introduction into education limited the development of tolerance and compassion for others. Convinced that schools would benefit from professional counsellors, she insisted that each facility employ a psychologist, both to offer professional guidance and to collect scientific data on students with a view to creating better methods of education. Educational standards were codified in Articles 117–120 of the Polish constitution of 1921 and were amended in 1926, though her ideas were only marginally accepted by many Polish teachers at the time.

From 1922, Joteyko lectured at the State Institute of Special Education, which had been organized by Grzegorzewska. That year, and again in 1926, she chaired the Polish delegation to the International Congress on Moral Education. Beginning in 1924, she served as an editor of the Biuletyn Koła Psychologicznego (Psychological Circle Bulletin). In 1926, a year after the Pedagogical Institute closed, she began teaching at the Free Polish University, but was unable to conduct research there as it did not have a laboratory. Joteyko presented her last lecture at the State Institute of Special Education in 1926 and founded the quarterly Polskie Archiwum Psychologii (Polish Archives of Psychology), serving as its editor. The following year she was appointed to serve on a committee of the Economic Ministry and on the Labor Protection Council of the Ministry of Labor and Social Welfare. Also in 1926, she completed her post-doctoral degree in the Faculty of Medicine at the University of Warsaw.

== Death and legacy ==
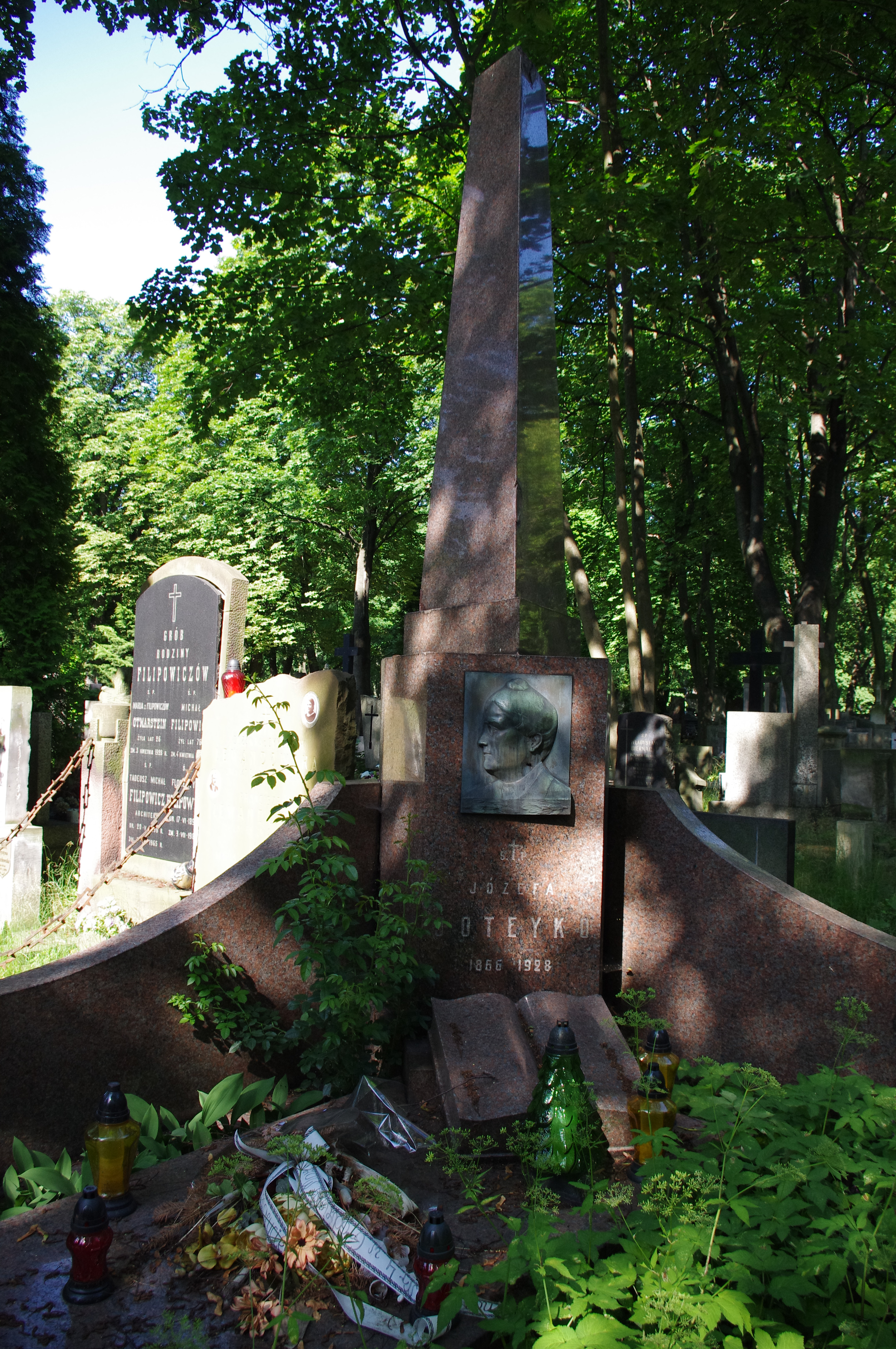
Joteyko's grave in Powązki Cemetery

In the late 1920s, Joteyko developed a heart condition which became more serious in 1927. Her companion Grzegorzewska cared for her during her final illness. She died on 24 April 1928 in Warsaw and was buried in the Powązki Cemetery. Her funeral procession was led by First Marshall Józef Piłsudski and President Ignacy Mościcki. At the time of her death, Joteyko was widely respected for her work, and, along with Marie Skłodowska-Curie, was one of the most internationally recognized Polish scientists. She is also remembered as a pioneer in educational reform in Poland. Her pedagogical approach to educational reform recognized that education included care not only of what students were learning, but of their physical and mental well-being, and adequately trained educators who fostered and inspired learning.

Joteyko published 262 works and left a collection of research in manuscript form. During her lifetime, she was appointed as a member of the Royal Society of Medical and Natural Sciences of Brussels and the Belgian Neurological Society in 1902, a member of the Association of French Chemists in 1903, and from 1904 a member of the Polish Philosophical Society in Lviv. She became an honorary member of the Accademia di fisica e chimica (Academy of Physics and Chemistry) of Palermo and toward the end of her life served as chair of the Polish Society of Psychotechnics (Polskie Towarzystwo Psychotechniczne). There is an elementary school in Grodzisk Mazowiecki and a middle and high school, Józefa Joteyko Gymnasium and Liceum in Kraków, which bear her name.
