= Michalina Stefanowska =

Polish biologist

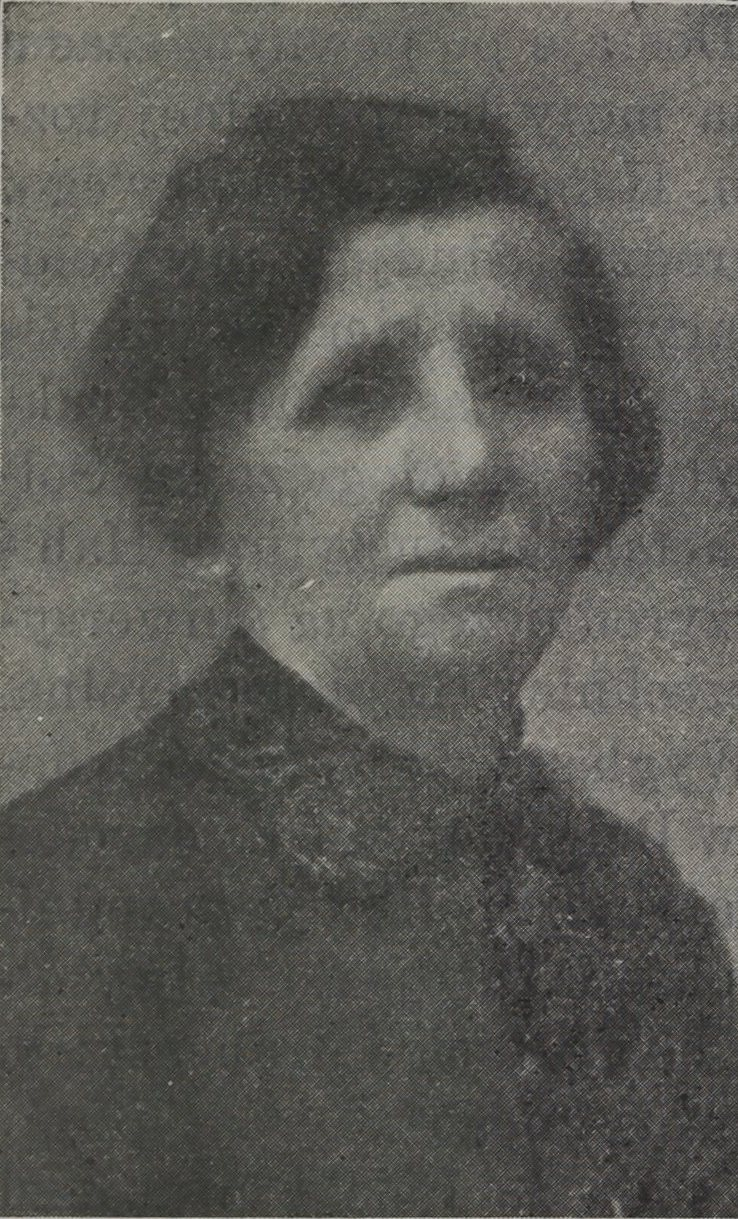
- Stefanowska in 1930
- Born: November 20, 1855; Hrodna, Russian Empire (present-day Belarus)
- Died: December 15, 1942 (aged 87); Kraków, Poland
- Education: University of Geneva
- Occupations: Biologist, neurophysiologist

Michalina Stefanowska (Polish pronunciation: [mi.xaˈli.na stɛfanɔfska]; November 20, 1855 – December 15, 1942) was a Polish neurophysiologist and biologist. She was a member of the Poznań Society of Friends of Sciences and the second woman (following Marie Curie) to become a member of the Polish Academy of Learning.

== Life ==
=== Early life ===
Born to Ferdynand and Joanna of Sienkiewicz, Michalina spent her early life in her home village of Grodno, Congress Poland where she was a teacher in nature and geography until attending the University of Geneva.

=== Academic career ===
She obtained her PhD in natural sciences in 1889 from the University of Geneva and studied nature and psychology in Paris from 1891 to 1897. Stefanowska took a temporary job at the Solvay Institute of Physiology in Brussels and was joined there in 1898 by her colleague and former housemate from Geneva and Paris, Józefa Joteyko. The two women published numerous research projects together, earning several prizes like the Dieudonnée Prize of the Belgian Royal Academy of Medicine in 1901 and the Montyon Prize of the French Academy of Sciences in 1903. She then earned her postdoctoral degree in general physiology in 1903 from the University of Geneva. After a decade of advance study and research experience, she accepted a position as Privatdozent in physiology at the University of Geneva. Stefanowska would then join in the research of the university's Botanical Institute and the Ecole Cantonale d'Horticulture to work in plant physiology. In 1908, she returned to Poland and held a lecture position for four years in physiology and neurology at one of the Wydz higher education facilities in Warsaw.

Throughout most of World War I and the German occupation of Poland (1912–1917), she headed the Orzeszkowa Gymnasium for girls while concurrently lecturing at the University of Poznan. At the request of the school authorities of Warsaw, she created the first special classes for mentally handicapped children and two years later, she organized a one-year course for teachers of special schools which would later become the State Institute of Special Education. In 1922, she was appointed as assistant professor of physiology and neurology and then in the following year she became professor of anthropology until 1939.

=== Later life and death ===
As the world became embroiled in World War II, Stefanowska died in Cracow, Poland in December 15, 1942.

== Legacy ==
Stefanowska was a pioneer in the fields of physiology, neurology and experimental psychology. She popularized the study by publishing a book on the life and behavior of marine life. She saw how observing animal behavior could be applied to human behavior. Her early research, published in the Solvay Institute's Travaux, dealt with nerve-cell organization, neurotransmission mechanisms and the effects of anesthesia and electrical stimulation on cortical circuits.

Due to her broad interests in the sciences and her experiences in teaching, Stefanowska recognized the importance of science education. She contributed a translation for the Polish public of work from French scientists in an effort to increase interest in the natural sciences.

== Awards, honors and tributes ==
Following Marie Curie, Stefanowska was the second woman to be inducted as a member of the Polish Academy of Learning as a corresponding member in 1931 and held membership in the Poznań Society of Friends of Sciences.

== Publications ==
- translation of Heaven Camille Flammarion (1892)
- Sensory asymmetry and centers for pain with Józefa Joteyko (1904)
- Life in the ocean. Description of popular plants and marine animals (1905)
- The evolution of neuron theory (1908)
