= Lasha Darbaidze =

Georgian-born American entrepreneur

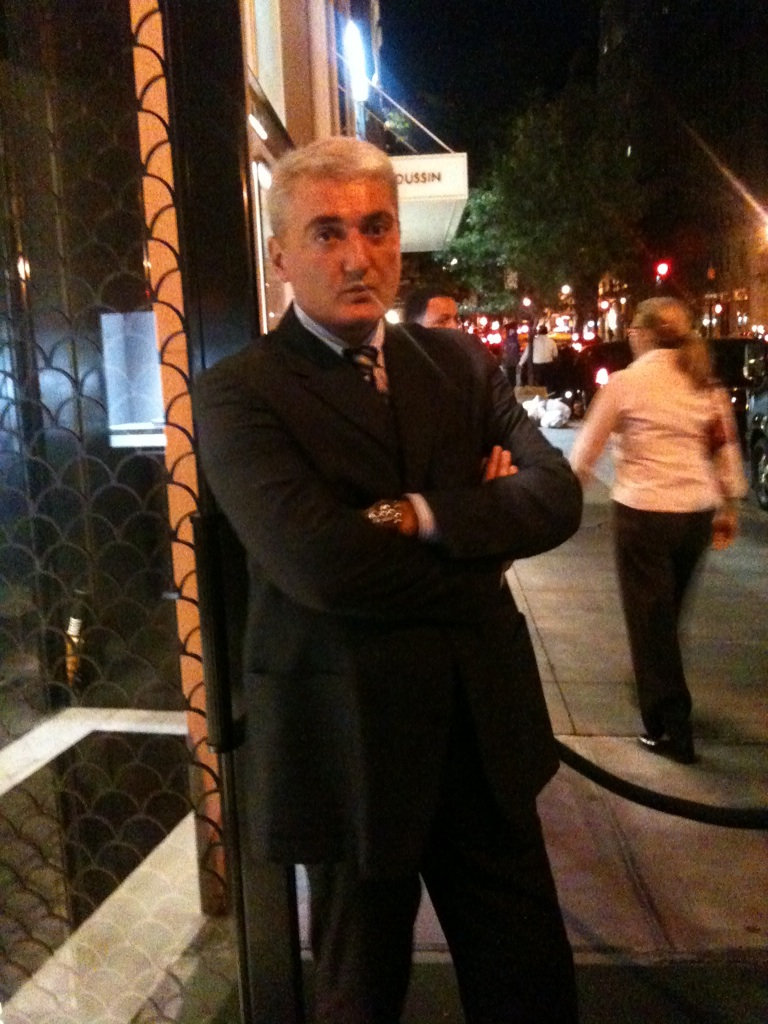
Lasha Darbaidze, January 2011

Lasha Darbaidze (born January 23, 1969) is a Georgian-born American citizen who holds the positions of Honorary Consul of Georgia since 2010, and President of the St. George Foundation since 2004.

== Early life ==
Darbaidze graduated from the Physical Mathematical School (Komarov) and then earned engineering, classics and philosophy degrees at the Georgian Technical University, both in the capital Tbilisi. He served in the Soviet military where he earned the rank of Chief Lieutenant and obtained experience in military administration management. Darbaidze returned to Tbilisi after serving his military duty to pursue his entrepreneurial interests.

== Career ==
In 1999 Darbaidze immigrated to the United States. He settled in New York City and began working as the head of security for All-Tech Security and Investigation. While there, Darbaidze developed and managed twenty professional security departments/teams for such luxury brands as Chanel, Prada, Fendi and Graff. He acquired expertise in loss prevention, security management, risk management, audits, inventory control and safety strategy. Darbaidze decided to open his own security business in 2001 and operated under the name RM Security Services as a major subcontractor for All-Tech Security and Investigation in the New York metropolitan area. Then, in 2003 he was recruited by Graff USA to become their U.S. Security Director, a position he currently holds.

In order to restructure and expand his own business, Darbaidze incorporated RM Security Services under the name LMIP Security, Inc. in 2009. The new structural and financial approach (with investment from Lerner Accounting Services, a private company in Brooklyn, NY, specializing in accounting, healthcare and regions interstate billing services) gave LMIP Security the financial strength and higher insurance coverage it needed to provide security services nationwide to such clients as Graff, De Beers, Hublot, Dolce & Gabbana. Darbaidze also maintains his position as a major security subcontractor for All-Tech Security and Investigation, with clients such as David Yurman, Judith Ripka & Longchamp.

Darbaidze is President of the St. George Foundation, which he founded in 2004, to provide assistance to the Georgian community in the United States. Most notably it purchased the Holy Rosary Church in Hanover Township, PA. It has become a Georgian Orthodox monastery and religious center. In January 2011 Darbaidze and foundation members traveled to Tbilisi to make a donation to the Gldani Crisis Center, which provides a home for under-privileged and special needs children. He is the largest source of employment for the Georgian community in the United States.

In 2010 the Georgian government awarded Darbaidze the position of Honorary Consul, which is headquartered in Millburn, NJ. This diplomatic status was approved by the U.S. State Department in November 2010. However, in October 2011 Georgian government stripped Darbaidze of his Honorary Consul appointment as well as his Georgian citizenship.
