= Varia Kipiani =

Georgian scientist

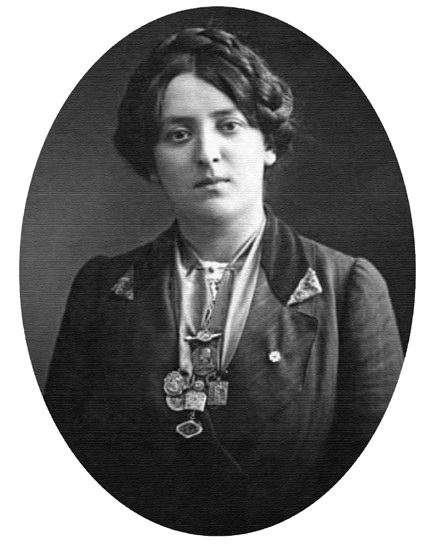
- Kipiani in 1913
- Born: Barbare Kipiani; 4 February 1879; Kutaisi, Caucasus Viceroyalty, Russian Empire
- Died: 1965 (aged 85–86); Brussels, Belgium
- Other name: Varia Kipiani-Eristavi
- Occupations: Scientist, academic

Barbare "Varia" Kipiani (Georgian: ბარბარე "ვარია" ყიფიანი; 4 February 1879 – 1950-1965) was the first Georgian trained as a psychophysiologist and is recognized as a pioneering woman scholar of Georgia. Born into a noble family, Kipiani and her sisters were raised by her father after her parents' divorce. After graduating from St. Nino's School in Tbilisi in 1899, she taught in a school in Khoni for two years. Moving to Belgium, where her father had relocated, she entered the medical faculty of the Free University of Brussels in 1902. Unable to afford her tuition, Kipiani was mentored by Polish academic, Józefa Joteyko, who paid her school fees and allowed her to work in a laboratory. She wrote a paper titled "L'ergographie du sucre" ("The Ergography of Sugar"), which evaluated the use of sugar in alleviating fatigue. Her study won a silver medal from the Association des chimistes de France et des colonies ('Association of Chemists of France and the Colonies') in 1906. After completing her coursework in the medical faculty in 1907, Kipiani lectured at various universities and continued research with Joteyko on nutrition and fatigue. They jointly were awarded the Vernois Prize of the French Académie Nationale de Médecine in 1908 for their work on vegetarianism.

Impacted by biases against women scientists, the two women shifted their career studies toward child development, focusing on the emerging field of paedology. They studied various aspects of memorization and the senses, attempting to develop teaching methods that could improve society. In 1910, Kipiani received the Valentin Haily Medal at the Congrès des Typhlophiles ('congress to benefit the blind') in Paris for two papers she wrote about educating blind students. Among other studies, she published works on sensory psychology, the use of both muscles and vision in learning to write, auditory versus visual learning, and tropism. She was a proponent of teaching students to be ambidextrous and to use physical exercise to create bilateral symmetry in the body. Her works on ambidexterity argued that training both the dominant and weaker sides of the body would enhance motor and intellectual capacity and allow quicker recovery if one side of the body or brain was damaged. At the end of World War I, Kipiani briefly returned to Georgia, but when the Russian Red Army invaded the country, she moved back to Belgium. As paedology did not survive as a field of scientific study, upon her return to Brussels, Kipiani taught French and Russian at the University of Brussels.

In addition to her scientific work, Kipiani was one of the Georgian exiles who worked to preserve Georgian culture. Between 1910 and 1913, she curated and directed the collection of Georgian historical and ethnographic artifacts for the Palais Mondial ('World Palace'). The museum was founded by the Union of International Associations as a repository for collecting the world's knowledge. She also was responsible for preserving some of the estate of Salome Dadiani and her husband Prince Achille Murat as significant Georgian heritage. Although mainly forgotten after her death, 21st-century academics have begun to reevaluate her role in promoting vegetarianism in Belgium and France at the turn of the 20th century and her contributions to protecting Georgian culture.

== Early life and education ==
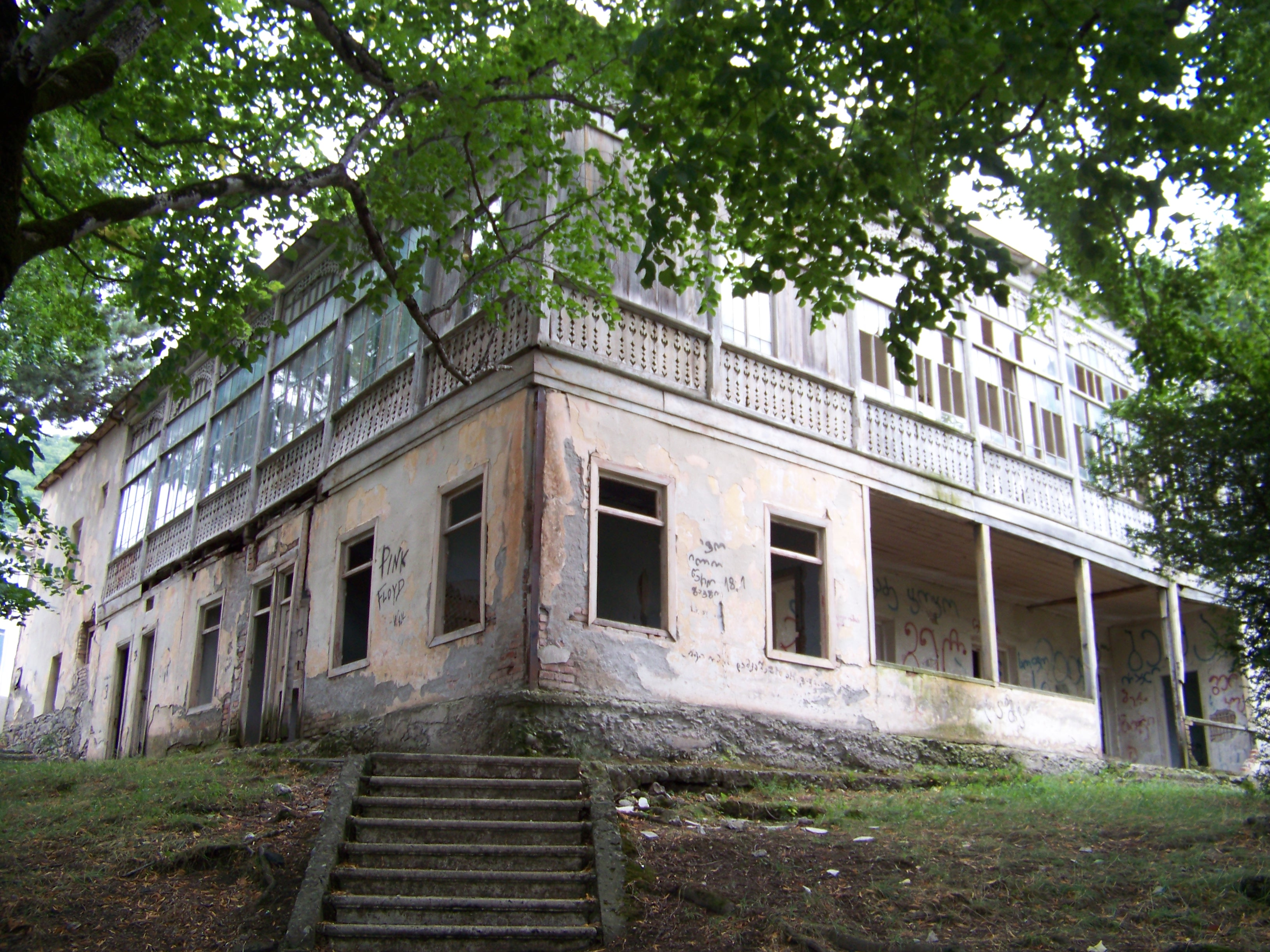
House of Dimitri Kipiani, where Varia was raised, in Kvishkheti, as of 2016

Barbara Kipiani, known as Varia, was born on 4 February 1879 in Kutaisi, in the Caucasus Viceroyalty of the Russian Empire, to Anastasia Eristavi and Nikoloz Kipiani. Ketevan the Martyr was an ancestor of her mother and her father was the oldest son of Dimitri Kipiani, a Georgian nobleman, scholar, statesman, and proponent of protecting Georgian culture from Russification. Kipiani grew up on her grandfather's estate near Kvishkheti, but when her parents divorced, she and her older sisters, Elisabet "Veta" and Nino, went with their father in 1883 to Batumi, where he was working in the judiciary system. Their brother remained with their mother after the divorce. Her grandfather was exiled to Stavropol in 1886 and assassinated the following year. The shock of his father's death caused health problems for Nikoloz, who moved abroad in 1890 to seek treatment, leaving his daughters in Tbilisi to attend St. Nino's School. He lived in France, Holland, Italy and Switzerland before settling in Belgium in 1895 and becoming the chair of Russian language studies at the Free University of Brussels. Kipiani attended St. Nino's School under a national scholarship program and graduated with honors in 1899.

== Career ==
=== First Belgian period (1902–1919) ===
After graduating, Kipiani taught at the St. Mary's School in Khoni until 1901, when she decided to join her father in Belgium. She enrolled in the medical faculty at the University of Brussels in 1902. Within two years, Kipiani was expelled because of an inability to pay her tuition. After making a presentation which was well-received at the Sixth International Congress of Physiologists held in Brussels in 1904, the Polish scientist Józefa Joteyko invited Kipiani to work in her laboratory at the Solvay Institute of Physiology and paid for her tuition. The laboratory focused on studying physiology, and specifically those functions that provided power to living organisms. Kipiani began studying how sugar could be used to combat fatigue. At the time, Armand Gautier in Paris and Auguste Slosse in Brussels were studying the diets of workers in their respective cities to evaluate whether the nutritional level of the population was adequate to maintain the level of their industrial activities. Her aim in conducting the studies was to contribute to the understanding of how nutrition and physiology could be applied to improving society. Findings on a study promoting vegetarianism sparked international discussion in newspapers, like The New York Times, women's magazines such as, Life & Health, and a book, Good Health and How We Won It by Upton Sinclair. Kipiani completed her studies in the medical faculty and graduated in 1907.

Kipiani became involved in protests in Brussels, sparked by the 1905 Russian Revolution and aimed at the Russian tsar and ruling class. As a means of furthering knowledge about Georgia and its culture, she began collecting Georgian art and cultural artifacts throughout Europe. With other Georgian students, in 1908 she performed at the Diamont Palace in an evening event which featured Georgian literature, music, and dancing. The students performed in various segments offering glimpses of Georgian culture. They acted in a drama, recited poetry, sang, and danced traditional dances in national costumes. In 1910, she attended the Congrès mondial des Associations Internationales ('World Congress of International Associations'), where it was proposed that the Palais Mondial ('World Palace') be established as a central repository for the world's knowledge. The original plan was to utilize one of the buildings from the Brussels International Exposition, but a new location had to be found after fire destroyed several sections of the exposition site. Kipiani curated and directed the collection of Georgian historical and ethnographic artifacts for the Palais Mondial, now known as the Mundaneum. She wrote to organizations in Georgia encouraging them to send books, pictures, or other items that could be added to the exhibit in order to improve exposure to Georgian achievements in education and technology. In 1913, when the collection was installed, she wrote to Giorgi Kereselidze, one of the leaders of the Georgian independence movement, urging him to print at least 100 copies of a flyer to publicize the collection to members of the Georgian diaspora.

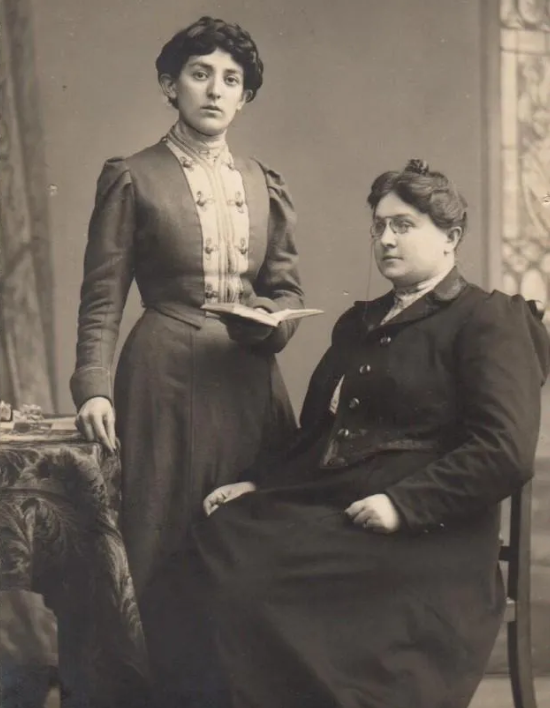
Józefa Joteyko (seated) and Varia Kipiani, 1910

In 1908, Joteyko founded and became editor of the Revue Psychologique, a journal which explored developments in the field of psychology from a scientific and educational perspective. Kipiani was hired as its executive secretary. She published several articles in the journal between 1908 and 1914, as well as various studies examining muscle memory, the adaptive multi-sensory practices of people with limited or no vision, vegetarianism, and ambidexterity. Kipiani lectured on psychophysiology and psychology at various universities, including her alma mater, the University of Liège and the University of Paris. In 1911, she worked as a laboratory assistant to Joteyko who that year founded and developed the curricula for the International Paedological Faculty of Brussels. The goal of this facility was to scientifically study children and their development to improve educational methods for the benefit of society as a whole. She also taught a course for the faculty in paedology practices, conducting laboratory studies on children's development. Paedology was an emerging science at the time, and the researchers of the International Paedological Faculty attempted to examine childhood development from both a physiological and psychological view as a basis for improving education. By 1913, Kipiani had been awarded medals by several learned societies and become a laureate of the Académie Nationale de Médecine in Paris. She was one of the invited speakers who participated in the Fourth Vegetarian Congress, held in The Hague in 1913. The following year, with the onset of World War I, all of the major universities in Belgium were closed. Joteyko left the country in 1915.

=== Return to Georgia (1919–1921) ===
Around 1919, Kipiani returned to Georgia. (Note: Ninia Sadghobelashvili's article in the magazine მასწავლებელი (Teacher) states that Kipiani was present and made a speech at the opening ceremony for the Tbilisi State University in 1918. However, a letter from John Oliver Wardrop, a British diplomat, written 16 November 1919, states Kipiani attended a dinner Wardrop hosted with Mamuka Orbeliani and other dignitaries in Brussels.) She taught French courses at the Georgian Nobles Gymnasium and the 5th Women's Gymnasium, both in Tbilisi. She also served as an assistant to Akaki Shanidze, the leading Georgian linguist and philologist, who had been one of the founders of Tbilisi State University, the previous year. Kipiani, who spoke Georgian, Russian, and French, assisted Shanidze in his work at the university library. In 1921, the Russian Red Army invaded Georgia. In the wake of the establishment of a pro-Russian government, opposition figures were suppressed through a Red Terror campaign. Kipiani was one of the targets of the state-sponsored political repression and fled the country, returning to Belgium.

=== Second Belgian period (1921–1950) ===
According to the academic Marc Depaepe, the goals of Belgian scientists in developing the field of paedology were not realized. Although they were at the center of the movement to ground education and teaching on scientific methodology, rather than philosophy, the field collapsed at the end of World War I primarily because the behavior of children could not be reduced to scientific formulas that could be molded into determining social ideology. The Belgian government reorganized its higher education facilities in 1927, establishing for the first time standards for scientific research and the Fonds National de la Recherche Scientifique (National Fund for Scientific Research) to coordinate those policies. By that time, Kipiani had earned her doctorate and was reported in the Australian Woman's Mirror as "Dr. Varia Kipiani-Eristavi, a distinguished professor at Brussels University". She had published works in French, German and Russian and her work had been recognized internationally. She taught Georgian and Russian language courses at the university.

Kipiani had become the guardian of the effects and archives of Salome Dadiani and her husband Prince Achille Murat. In 1940, following the onset of World War II, she began negotiations with Mikheil Tarkhnishvili, (also transliterated as Michael Tarchnisvili), a Georgian priest working in Munich, to secure a monastery in Rome to protect the items. She believed that Rome would offer safety for the cultural artifacts because of an international agreement to protect the city from the war. In 1941, Tarkhnishvili traveled to Belgium to secure the bequest of another Georgian émigré, Sofia Goghieli, who had died in Brussels. He returned with the donations to Berlin. Hoping to establish a Georgian Catholic college and learning center in Rome, Tarkhnishvili worked with Georgian émigrés associated with Nazi intelligence agents of AMT IV. The agents intended to install an intelligence-gathering network and radio station within the building. Tarkhnishvili, unaware of the Nazi plan, located the villa of publisher Salvatore di Carlo on the Via Alessandro Brisse in the Monteverde Nuovo neighborhood. He purchased the villa in 1943 with the bequeathed funds and supplemental monies provided by AMT IV operatives, which he was told came from a Georgian benefactor. When the collaborators attempted to recruit Tarkhnishvili, he refused to participate in their plans, which caused the Nazis to go ahead without his cooperation using a mole. Renovations were begun, papal approval for the Georgian college was granted, and students were recruited by operatives. Tarkhnishvili stored the Dadiani and Murat items in the villa. He also transferred the materials obtained from the Georgian Catholic Monastery in Constantinople to the facility. All but one of the students left having no actual interest in becoming priests. On 4 June 1944, Rome was liberated by Allied forces and all of the students as well as Tarkhnishvili were arrested when the partially-installed radio antenna was located at the villa. Tarkhnishvili was later released, but the Georgian college and monastery were abandoned.

== Death ==
Several sources report that Kipiani died in 1965 and was buried in Brussels. The literary historian Vasil Chachanidze reported 1965 as her death year in 1974, but it was reported in 2021 that Rusudan Kobakhidze, director of the Museum of Georgian Emigration, proposed 1950 as Kipiani's likely year of death. Her personal archive was donated to the Georgian National Center of Manuscripts on 19 June 1965.

== Scientific works ==
=== Nutritional studies and fatigue ===
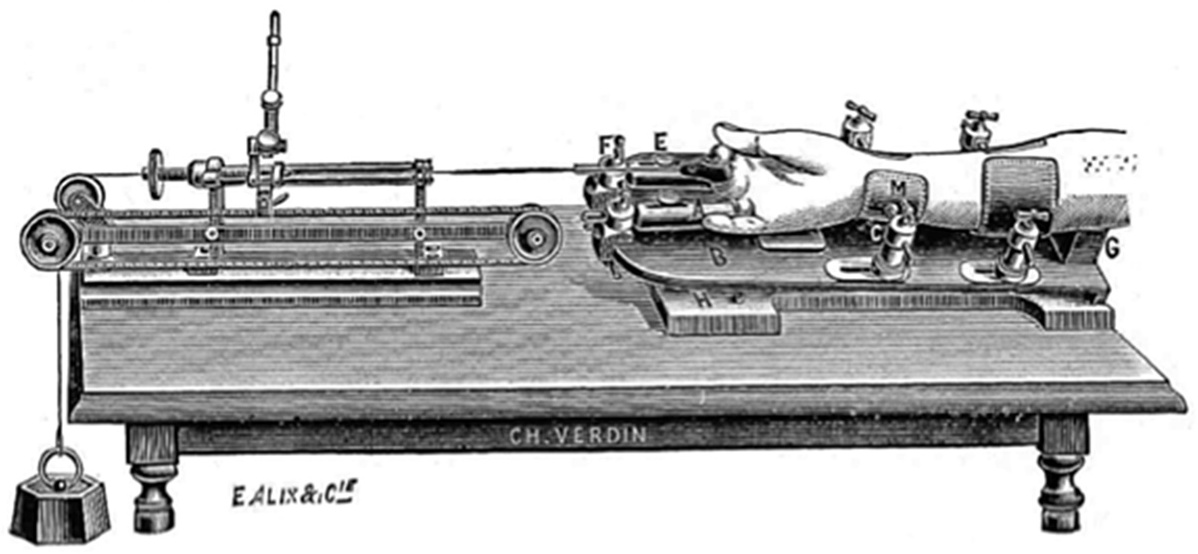
Mosso's ergograph

Kipiani worked with Joteyko from 1903 on a series of studies evaluating sugar's use in alleviating fatigue. Though they recognized that sugar was not a complete food, their experiments were designed to isolate the roles of various nutrients in providing fuel for the body. They used a device created by Angelo Mosso known as an ergograph. One part of the device held the hand so that it was immobile and allowed the finger to be inserted into a tube which was attached to a stylus that recorded muscle contractions on a rotating cylinder. Attaching a weight to a finger on each hand, the subject repeatedly raised the weight until fatigue set in and the weight could no longer be lifted. The device recorded the declining ability to lift the weight, creating a fatigue curve. They tested both the right and left hands of subjects to measure the differences in their ability to operate the device. They later used this same device in their studies on vegetarianism.

Joteyko presented part of the findings to the Royal Society of Medical and Natural Sciences of Brussels in 1904. In 1905, Kipiani published additional information in issue 5 of the Bulletin de l'Académie royale de Belgique Classe des sciences (Bulletin of the Royal Academy of Belgium Science Classes) and a 172-page report, "L'ergographie du sucre" ("The Ergography of Sugar"). The study evaluated participants from military and sporting events who had become fatigued after strenuous activity and their ability to increase their mental or motor activity after consuming sugar. She noted that the impact of sugar was amplified if the participants had fasted for between three and four hours before its ingestion. A review by Walbaum in the Zentralblatt für Gynäkologie of 1906 noted that when Kipiani evaluated the case of fatigue during childbirth, she reported that ingesting sugar relieved fatigue of both striated abdominal muscles and uterine smooth muscles during birth and reduced the feeling of fatigue caused by nerve endings within the muscles. She noted that 25 grams of sugar dissolved in water or milk and given three times in half-hour intervals relieved fatigue within ten minutes without the toxic effects of wine or drugs. In a 1907 review for the Zentralblatt für Gynäkologie, Walbaum noted that Kipiani had also compared the body's reaction to cane versus fruit-based sugars. She argued that cane sugar was harder to digest and often created gastric irritation. In recognition of their work, Joteyko was awarded a gold medal, as head of the laboratory, and Kipiani a silver medal from the Association des chimistes de France et des colonies (Association of Chemists of France and the Colonies) in 1906.

In 1907, Kipiani and Joteyko began a collaboration on vegetarianism, to which they both adhered. Their paper, "Enquete Scientifique sur les Vegetariens de Bruxelles" ("Scientific Survey on Vegetarians in Brussels") examined the basic health benefits of vegetarianism, concluding that the overall strength and endurance of people who followed a meat-free diet was superior. A review by Irving Fisher for the journal Science noted that their findings, which showed that there was little difference in the strength of vegetarians and meat-eaters but significantly higher endurance in vegetarians, were similar to findings in a study of Yale students conducted in 1906. The Yale study and others also confirmed Joteyko and Kipiani's findings that vegetarians recuperated more quickly from fatigue than did people who consumed meat. However, Fisher stressed that it was possible that the differences might not indicate a need to omit meat entirely, but rather to consume a "low-proteid diet", now known as a low-protein diet, or only meat which was free from intestinal bacteria or other contaminants. They were awarded the 1908 Vernois Prize of the Académie Nationale de Médecine for their work. They published a follow-up study, "Le végétarisme et son influence sur la santé publique, le commerce, l'industrie et l'économie de la nature" ("Vegetarianism and Its Influence on Public Health, Commerce, Industry and the Economy of Nature") in 1909, which had been presented to the International Food Congress the previous year.

=== Sensory studies ===
In 1910, Kipiani was awarded the Valentin Haily Medal at the Congrès des Typhlophiles ('congress to benefit the blind') in Paris for her papers, "Expériences sur les illusions musculaires chez les aveugles, les voyants et les sourds-muets" ("Experiments on Muscular Illusions in Blind, Sighted and Deaf-Mutes") and "La réforme de la lecture et de l'écriture chez les voyants et les aveugles en rapport avec les lois de la symétrie" ("The Reform of Reading and Writing for both Seeing and Blind in Relation to the Laws of Symmetry"). "Expériences sur les illusions" explored touch in the relationship between volume and weight for people who were blind or for sighted people who were blindfolded. Subjects were given objects of identical weight and surface area. They reported that objects which felt more voluminous were likely to be heavier and require more effort to lift. "La réforme de la lecture et de l'écriture" recommended that students should alternate between reading left to right and right to left, as well as training both hands to write. They also published "Les bases psychologiques de l'éducation sensorielle" ("The Psychological Bases of Sensorial Education") containing twelve laws of sensory psychology which could be used by educators to promote bilateral development.

The two women collaborated on another study in 1912, "Rôle du sens musculaire dans le dessin" ("Role of the Muscular Sense in Drawing") to evaluate whether people could draw a subject accurately with their eyes closed. They noted that the drawings produced resembled children's sketches and lacked perspective, accurate proportions, and resemblance to the model. Their "Rôle du sens musculaire et de la vision, dans l'écriture" ("Role of Muscular Sense and Vision in Writing") examined the learning process: seeing a letter and using the hand to imitate that letter. They noted that once proficiency had been gained, seeing the letter was no longer necessary and concluded that teaching students to constantly look at letters could strain the eyes. They stressed that more attention should be paid to muscle memory and teaching methods which did not promote eye strain or poor posture. In another 1912 work, "Visualisation colorée et sens chromatique chez Mlle Uranie Diamandi" ("Colored Visualization and Chromatic Sense of Miss Uranie Diamandi"), Kipiani studied the phenomena of grapheme–color synesthesia, in which numbers and letters appear to be associated with colors. These were part of a series of studies she and Joteyko made on memorization, which also included works such as "Nouveau procédé de determination des types de mémoire" ("New Method for Determining Memory Types"), analyzing the difference in those who learned by auditory and visual methods. She analyzed the reaction of school children to a light source, making comparisons with tropism, the phenomena of plants turning toward the light. In her 1913 paper, "Le rôle des tropismes et de la symmétrie dans la vie intégrale de l'être humain" ("The Role of Tropism and Symmetry in the Integral Life of the Human Being"), Kipiani discussed the importance of exercise to fully develop the body and eliminate the tendency for outside stimuli to promote growth in only one direction. These studies were designed to allow educators to adapt educational practices to meet children's sensory development.

Kipiani began to study right-handedness in 1907 with Joteyko. Students of varying genders were asked to lift weights weighing 2 kg (4 lb) repeatedly every two seconds for twenty to thirty repetitions. After resting, they then repeated the exercise on the opposite arm. The study noted that "exhausting work when accomplished by the left hand, produces a more intense (more injurious) effect on the heart, than the same work when performed by the right hand…". They also concluded that if both hands were used to raise the weight, the pulse elevation was less than that when done by either hand and that women who were left-handed had the highest pulse rate increase when lifting with the left hand. Expanding her tests to include hearing, sight, and touch, Kipiani reported that these senses tended to be superior on the same side as the dominant hand. In 1912, Kipiani published "Ambidextrie: Étude expérimental et critique" ("Ambidexterity: Experimental and Critical Study"). In the paper, she presented detailed analysis for both the physiological and neurological basis of favoring one hand over the other. At the time Medard Schuyten, director of an internationally-known paedological laboratory in Antwerp was promoting the opposing view that focus should be on developing the body's naturally dominant side. In spite of the anatomical basis for asymmetry, Kipiani argued that there were benefits to educators attempting to help students develop more symmetrically. She argued that teaching methods which encouraged students to use only one hand reinforced the principle of least effort and prevented the full development of both sides of the brain. Instead, she suggested that training both sides increased both motor and intellectual capacity and allowed quicker recovery if one side of the body or brain was damaged.

== Legacy ==
Kipiani and Joteyko's work on vegetarianism and her own work on ambidexterity remained in print and influential through the 1930s, although a broad international movement to encourage ambidexterity never emerged. A brief biography of Kipiani was included in the Georgian Soviet Encyclopedia, published in 1986, noting that she was the first Georgian woman to become a psychophysiologist. Although she had many accomplishments in her lifetime both in science and in promoting Georgian culture, like other women internationally and in Georgia, Kipiani and her achievements were largely forgotten in the historical record. In the 21st century, scholars began revisiting the careers of Kipiani and Joteyko and studying their impact on vegetarianism in Belgium and France at the turn of the twentieth century. Sociologist Alexandra Hondermarck noted that their studies gained significant traction because they used innovative scientific methods to research vegetarianism. They were among the very few women doctors and scientists centrally involved in the vegetarian movement. According to Hondermarck, despite their innovations, the success of Joteyko and Kipiani forced them to become involved in fields which were less competitive with their male colleagues. Historian Levan Z. Urushadze noted in his 2008 research on Kipiani that although disseminating information about Georgia in her lifetime was illegal under Russification and later Sovietization policies, Kipiani played a prominent role in promoting and protecting Georgian culture. (Note: From 1863, Russification and later Sovietization policies pushed for cultural assimilation in the territories incorporated into the empire. The policies primarily were designed to unify the country under Russian administration, prevent rebellion, and diminish the influence of various ethnic cultural traditions. The implementation and severity of reforms were impacted by the vastness of the territory, lack of resources, and inadequate numbers of administrative supervisors in more rural areas. Russian replaced Georgian language instruction in schools beginning in 1867. From around 1920, Soviet policy recognized that by allowing ethnic groups to use their own languages and practice their cultural traditions, it might incentivate non-Russians into acceptance of Soviet authority and policies. However, limits were imposed to prevent anyone from promoting their own ethnicity and cultural identity above that of the Soviet regime. Under Joseph Stalin and, particularly after World War II, any public criticism of Russian culture or Soviet authority was a punishable offense.) Many Georgian sources now recognize her as a pioneering Georgian woman academic.

== Selected works ==
- Kipiani, Varia (1905). Ergographie du sucre [Ergography of Sugar] (in French). Brussels: Librairie médicale de Henri Lamertin. OCLC 866564339.
- Ioteyko, Józefa; Kipiani, Varia (1907). Enquête scientifique sur les végétariens de Bruxelles: leur résistance à la fatigue étudiée à l'ergographe, la durée de leurs réactions nerveuses, considérations énergétiques et sociales [Scientific Survey of Vegetarians in Brussels: Their Resistance to Fatigue Studied with an Ergograph, the Duration of Their Nervous Reactions, Energy and Social Considerations] (in French). Brussels, Belgium: Henri Làmertin for the Société végétarienne de France. OCLC 11890357.
- Kipiani, Varia; Alexander, M. (1908). "Influence de l'éther sulfurique sur la sensibilité cutanée" [Influence of Sulfuric Ether on Skin Sensitivity]. La Revue Psychologique (in French). 1. Bruselles: E. Rossel. OCLC 183330003.
- Kipiani, Varia (1910). "La réforme de la lecture et de l'êcriture en rapport avec les lois de la symétrie" [The Reform of Reading and Writing in Relation to the Laws of Symmetry]. La Revue Psychologique (in French). 3. Bruselles: E. Rossel. OCLC 183330003.
- Ioteyko, Józefa; Kipiani, Varia (April 1912). "Rôle du sens musculaire et de la vision, dans l'écriture" [Role of Muscular Sense and Vision in Writing]. Revue d'hygiène et de thérapeutique oculaires (in French). 6. Paris: Librairie A. Maloine: 49–59. OCLC 230934481.
- Kipiani, Varia (January 1912). "Visualisation colorée et sens chromatique chez Mlle Uranie Diamandi" [Colored Visualization and Chromatic Sense of Miss Uranie Diamandi] (PDF). Le Monde Psychique (in French). 2 (11). Paris: l'Institut de Recherches Psychiques de France: 457–465. ISSN 2428-1093.
- Kipiani, Varia (1912). Ambidextrie: Etude expérimentale et critique [Ambidexterity: Experimental and Critical Study] (in French). Brussels: J. Lebègue & Co. OCLC 609233814.
