= Georgian Americans =

Americans of Georgian birth or descent

Total population
- 30,000 (2018–2022 data, Georgian immigrants); 120,000 (2025, ethnic Georgians; unofficial estimate by the Georgian Ministry of Foreign Affairs)

Regions with significant populations
- New York metropolitan area (especially Northern New Jersey) · Greater Los Angeles · other major U.S. metropolitan areas

Languages
- Georgian · American English

Religion
- Christianity (predominantly Georgian Orthodox, with Catholic and Protestant minorities) · Judaism · Irreligion

Related ethnic groups
- Georgian diaspora

Georgian Americans (Georgian: ქართველი ამერიკელები, romanized: kartveli amerik'elebi) are Americans of full or partial Georgian ancestry. They encompass ethnic Georgians who have immigrated to the U.S. from Georgia, as well as Russia and other areas with significant Georgian populations.

The precise number of Americans of Georgian descent is unknown. This is because 19th and 20th century U.S. immigration records often did not differentiate between various ethnic groups originating in the Russian Empire, which had slowly annexed Georgia beginning in 1801 and of ruled it until 1918

== History ==
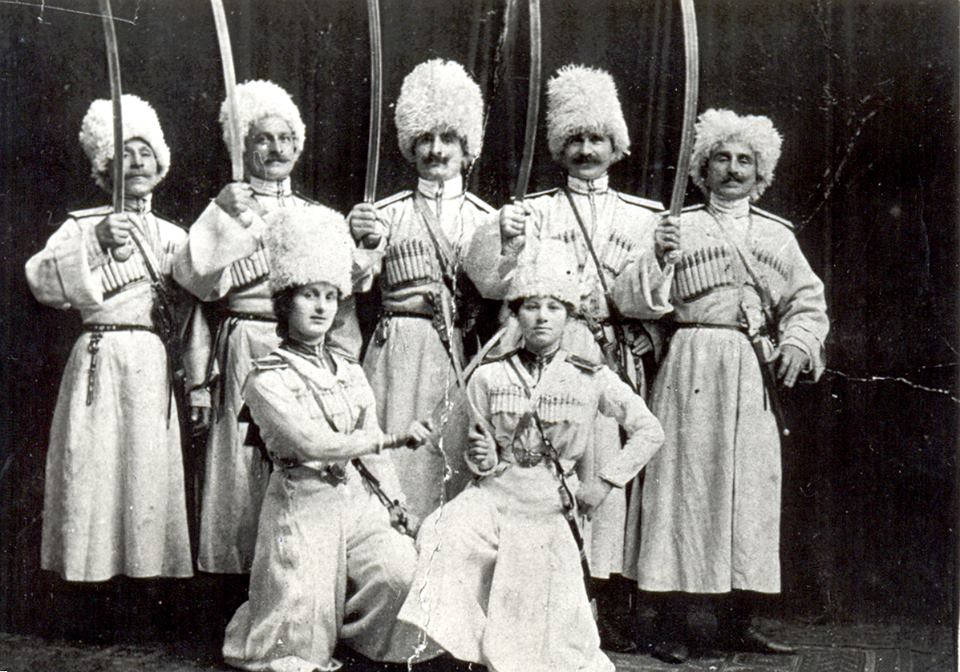
Georgian horsemen in the USA.

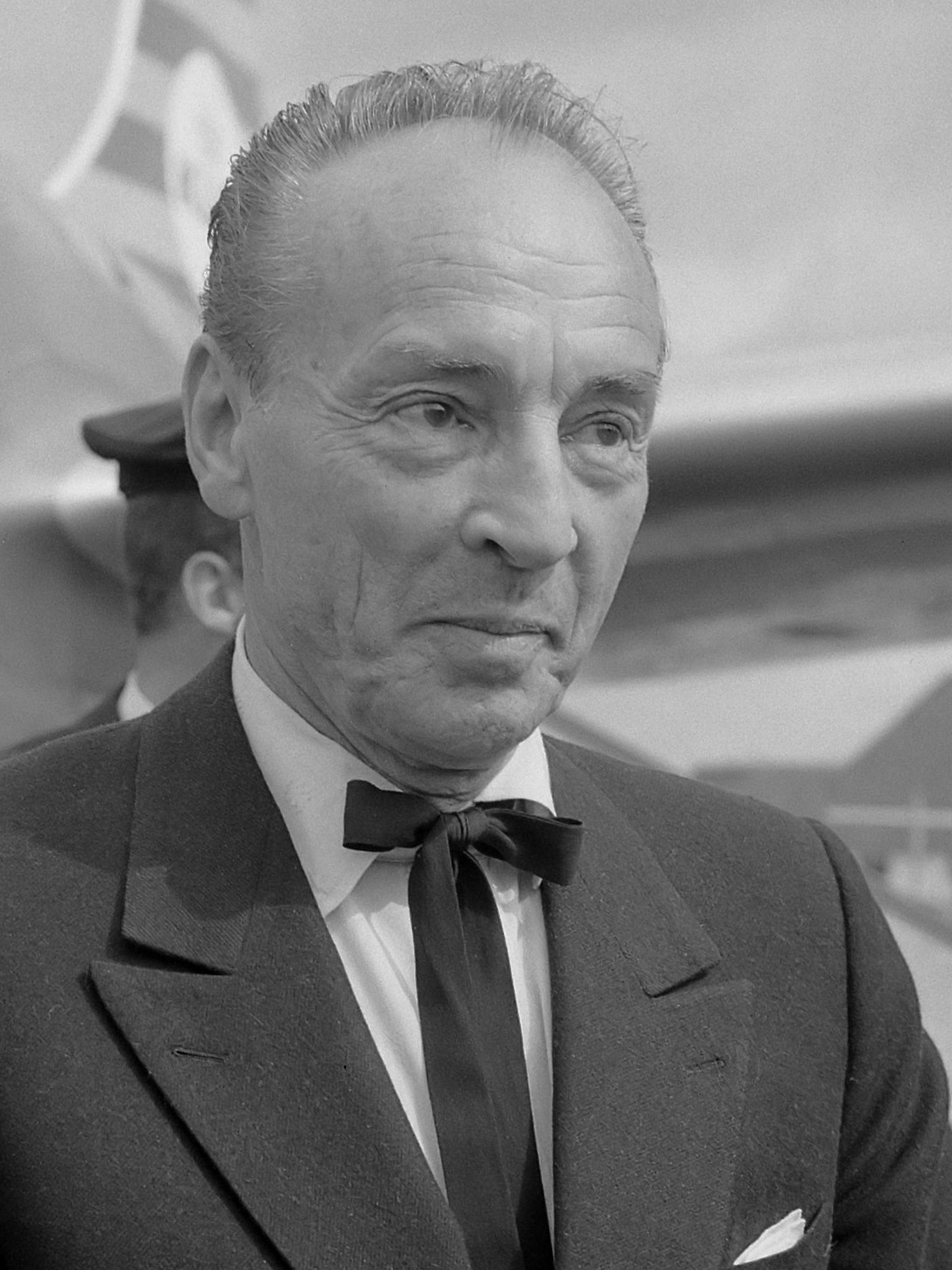
George Balanchine, the "father of American ballet", founder of the New York City Ballet

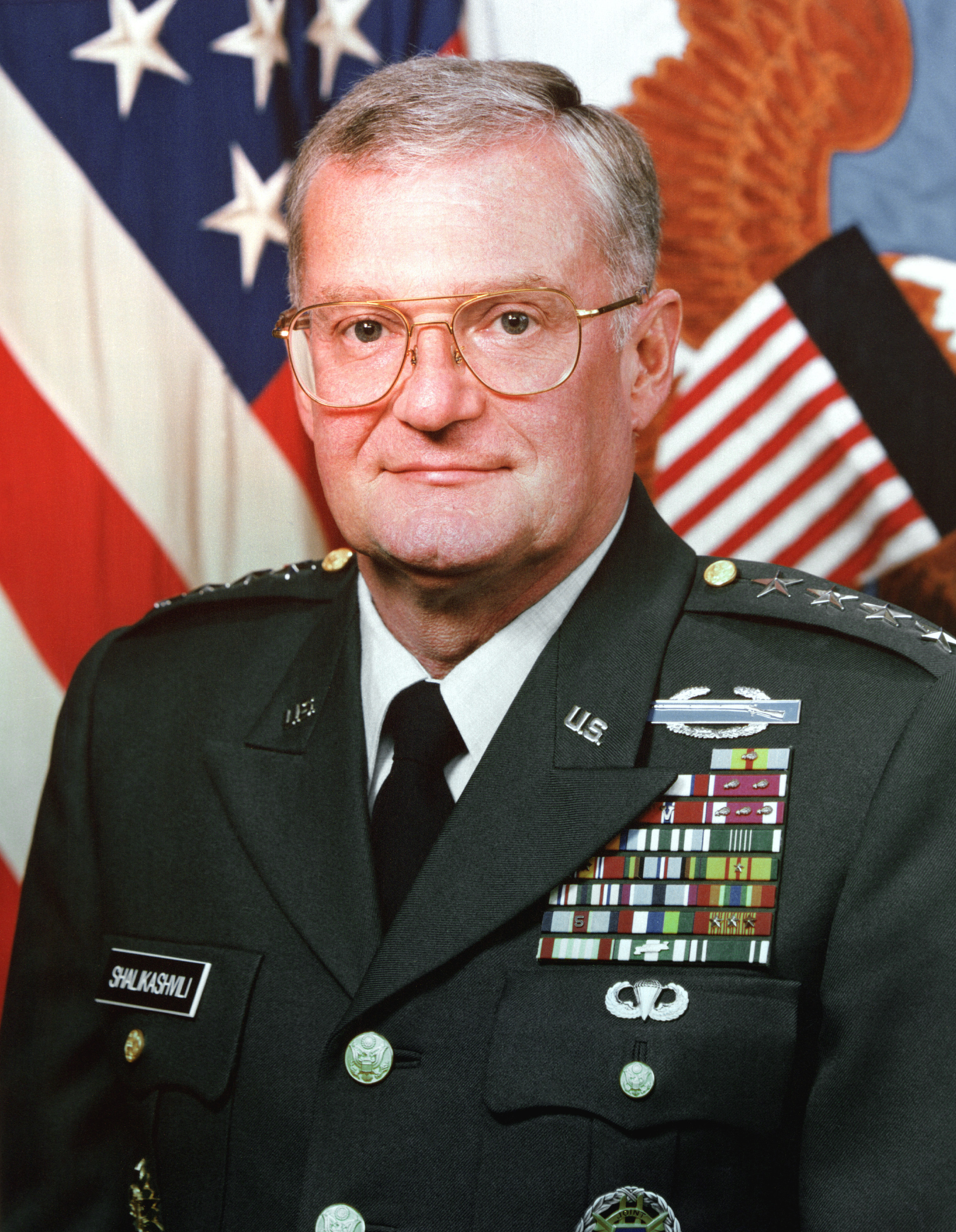
General John Shalikashvili, Chairman of the Joint Chiefs of Staff and Supreme Allied Commander

=== Early stages of immigration ===
The earliest recorded Georgian immigrants to the US were the Georgian horsemen. One group came in 1893 as part of a troupe of Cossack horsemen hired by Buffalo Bill Cody and his Congress of Rough Riders.

The number of Georgians coming to the U.S. saw an increase after political upheavals of the Russian Revolution forced the Georgian nobility and intellectuals, including those residing in other parts of the Russian Empire, to move to the U.S. In just several years, another wave of immigration of Georgians was triggered by the Red Army invasion of Georgia, which led to the exodus of intellectuals who were in fear of deportation and imminent death in Russian Siberia. A notable example of pre-Soviet immigration of ethnic Georgians is that of George Balanchine, whose immediate family was split between U.S. and Soviet Georgia.

=== Immigration during and following the Soviet Union ===
Emigration from Georgia was brought to a halt in the 1920s and 1930s, when the Soviet Union put in place restrictions on travel, both in and out of the Union. Despite these restrictions, some Georgians managed to flee to the U.S. during World War II. These were primarily ethnic Georgians who lived in liberated parts of Eastern Europe, as well as members of the Georgian military who were stationed or otherwise resided abroad. Such was the case with John Shalikashvili, a son of a Georgian officer, who would rise to become the Chairman of the Joint Chiefs of Staff and Supreme Allied Commander.

Following World War II, emigration from Soviet Georgia was virtually nonexistent until the collapse of the Soviet Union in 1991, after which an estimated one-fifth of Georgia's population left due to economic hardships. Unlike the first half of the 20th century, this final wave of emigration was wide-reaching and not limited to intellectuals or military personnel.

== Population ==
There are several concentrations of Georgians throughout the United States including the New York metropolitan area; Chicago; Portland, Oregon; San Francisco; the Washington metropolitan area; the Dallas-Fort Worth metroplex, and others. Dayton, Ohio, has a sizable Meskhetian Turk population, the majority of whom are from Georgia. During the 1970s, many Georgian Jews immigrated to Brooklyn, New York.

== Assimilation ==
Georgian-Americans created several organizations in order to maintain their culture. In 1924, organizations of Georgian-Americans were founded in the cities of San Francisco and New York. These organizations held cultural and social events, and has helped other immigrants. Between 1955 and 1975, the American press was very active in Georgia. Kartuli Azri (Georgian Opinion) was the most popular newspaper and its maintenance was based primarily on donations from Americans in Georgia. Although, over the years, Georgians have adapted to American culture, Georgian Americans still retain aspects of Georgian culture.

Some members of the Georgian-Jewish community in New York keep their ancestral Judeo-Georgian language.

== Notable people ==
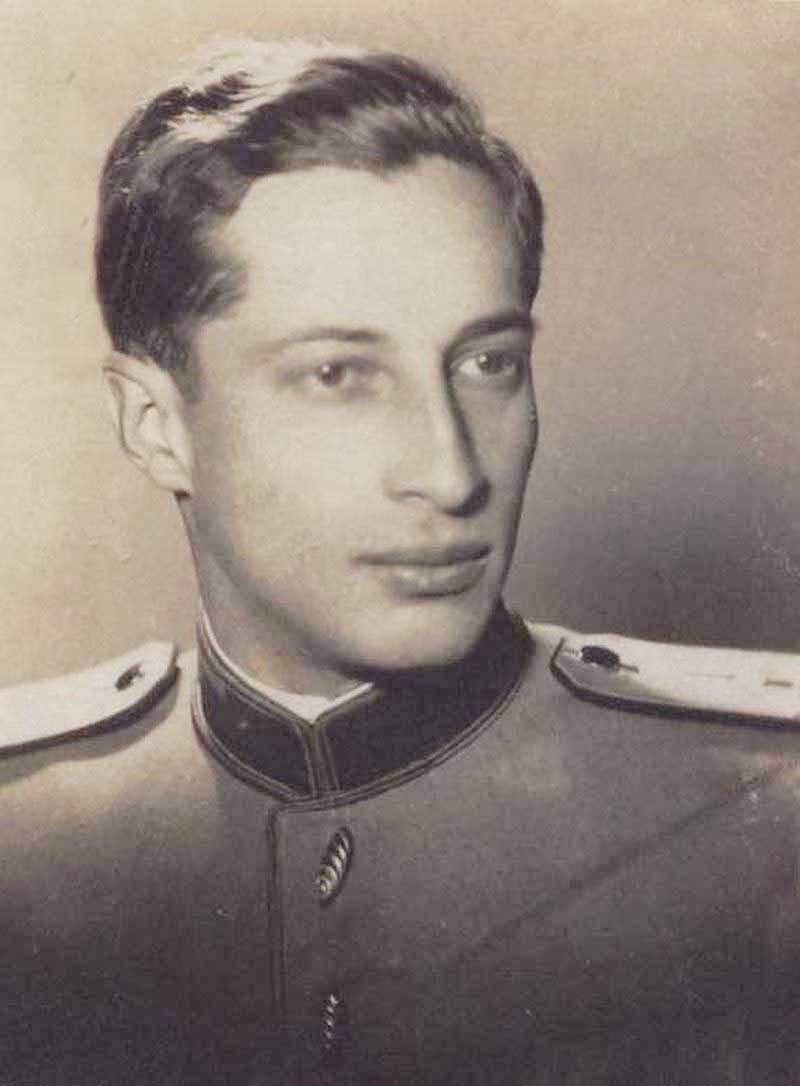
Teymuraz Bagration

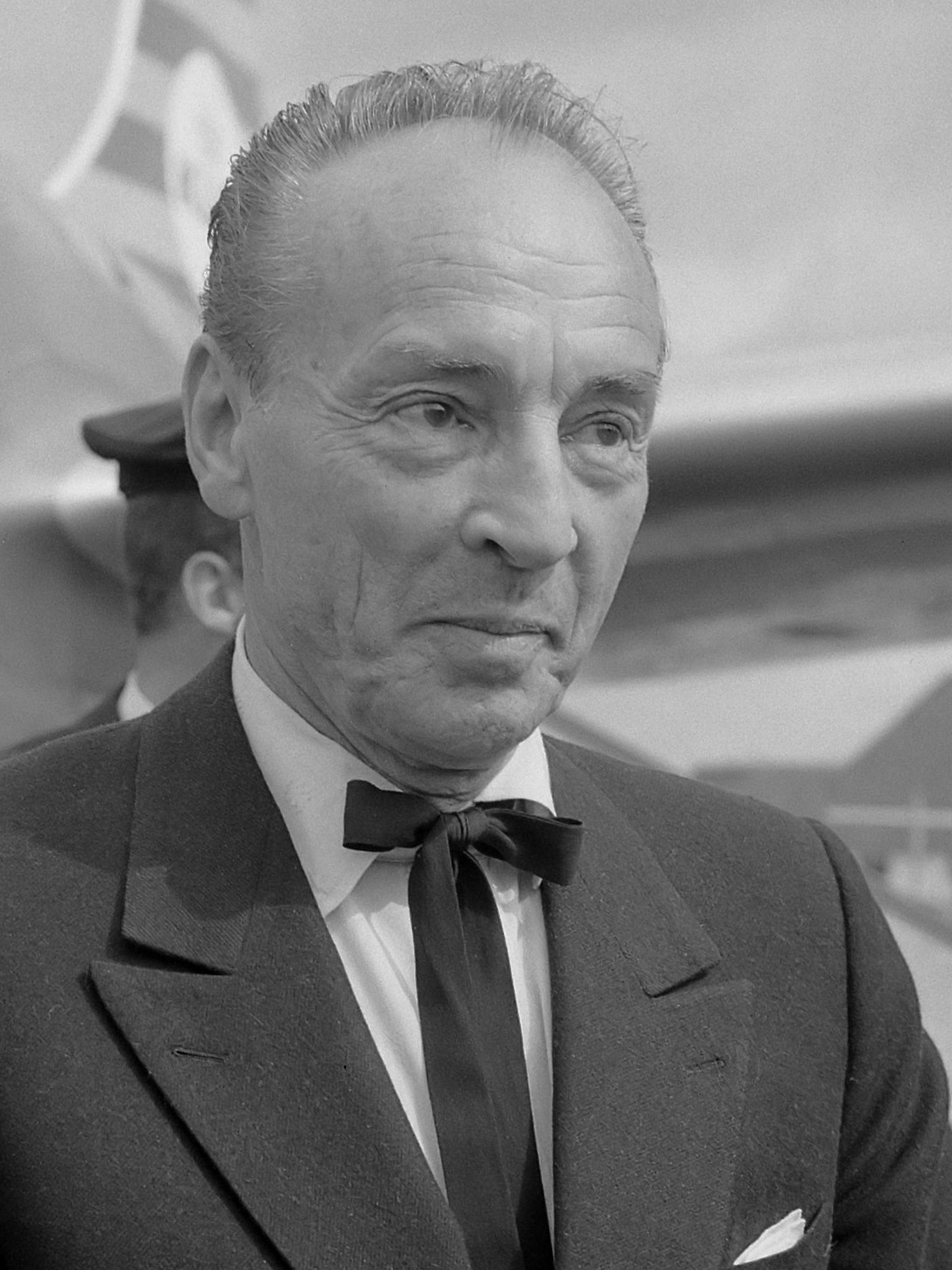
George Balanchine

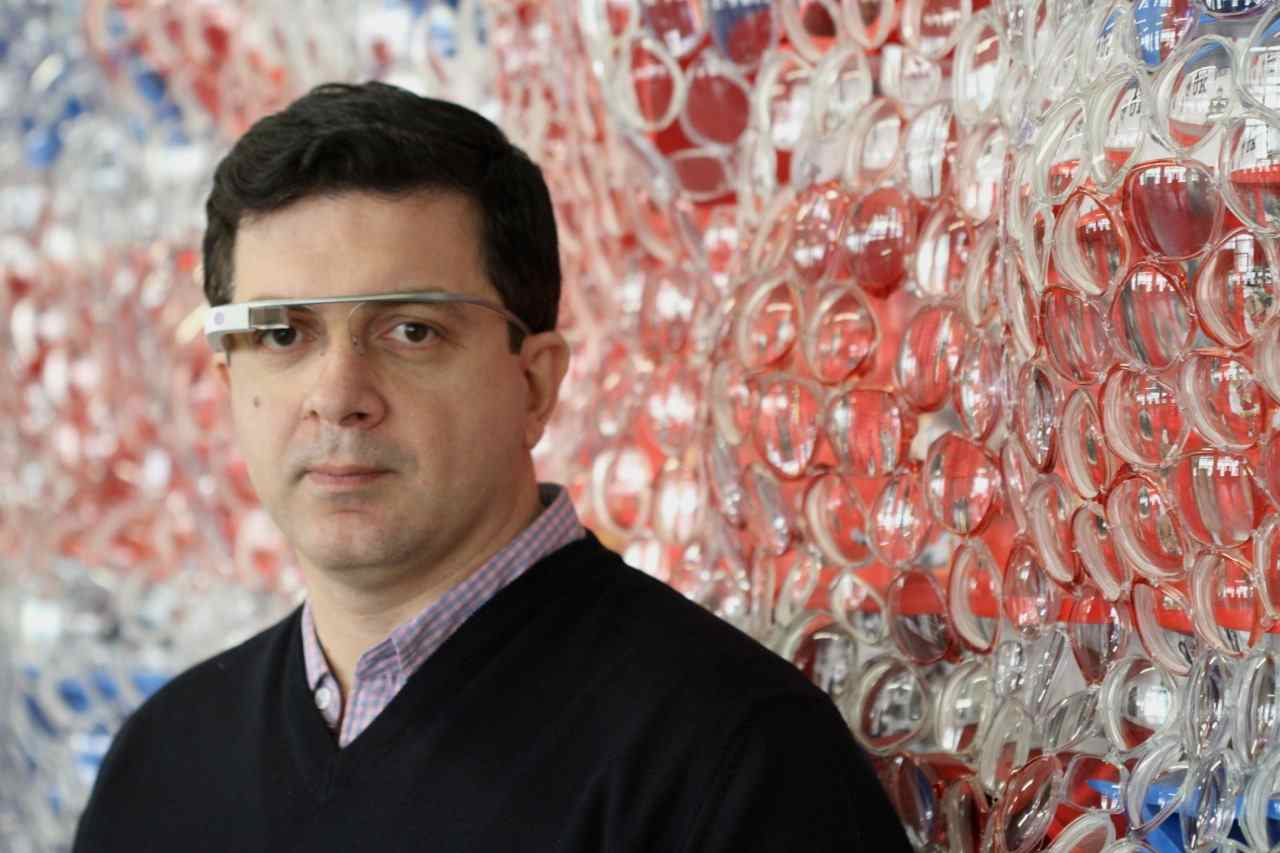
David Datuna

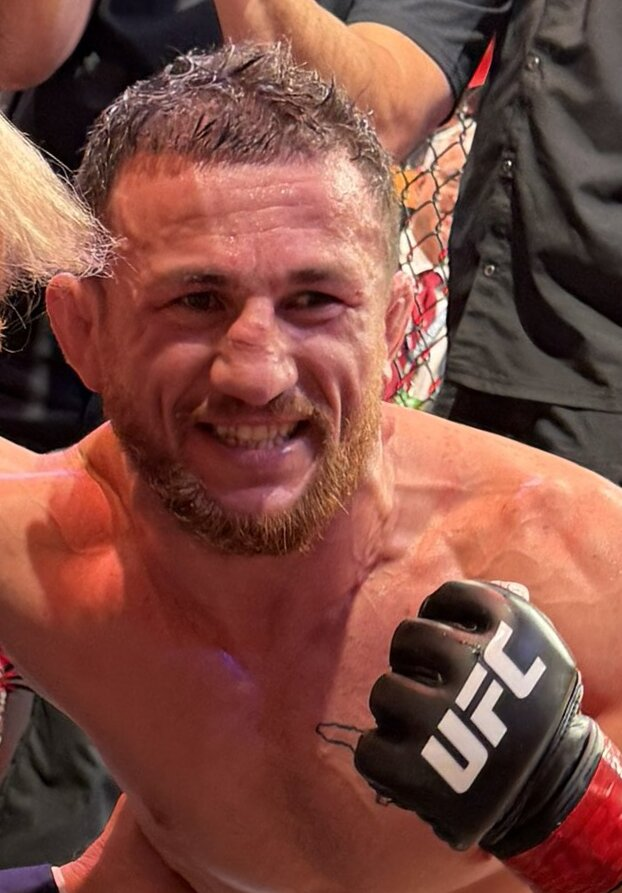
Merab Dvalishvili

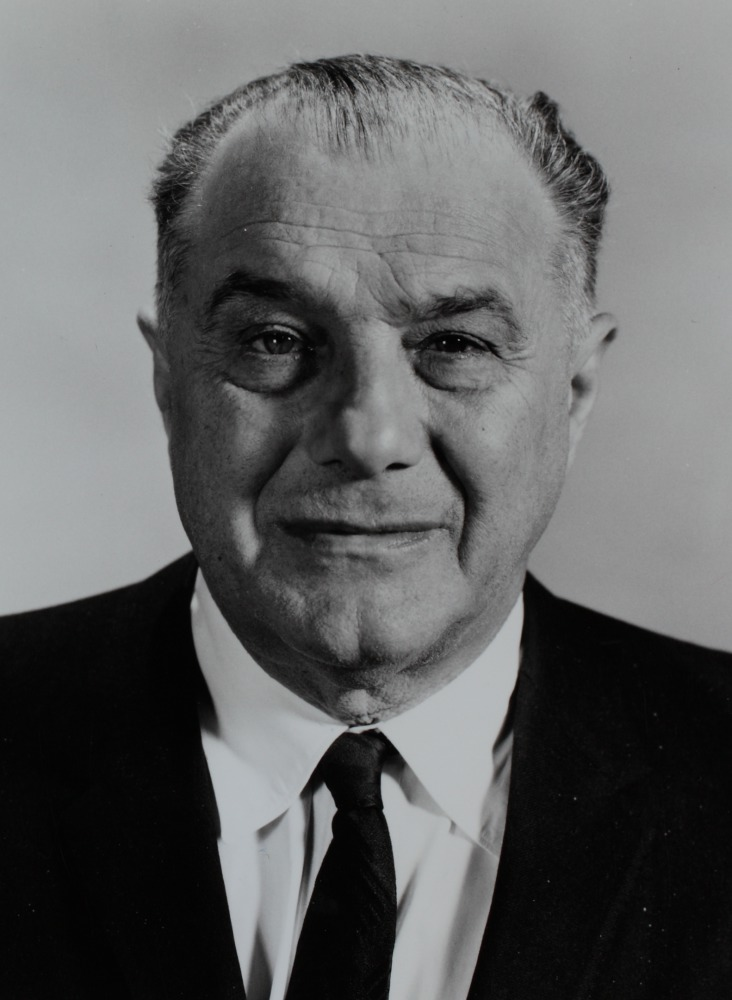
Alexander Kartveli

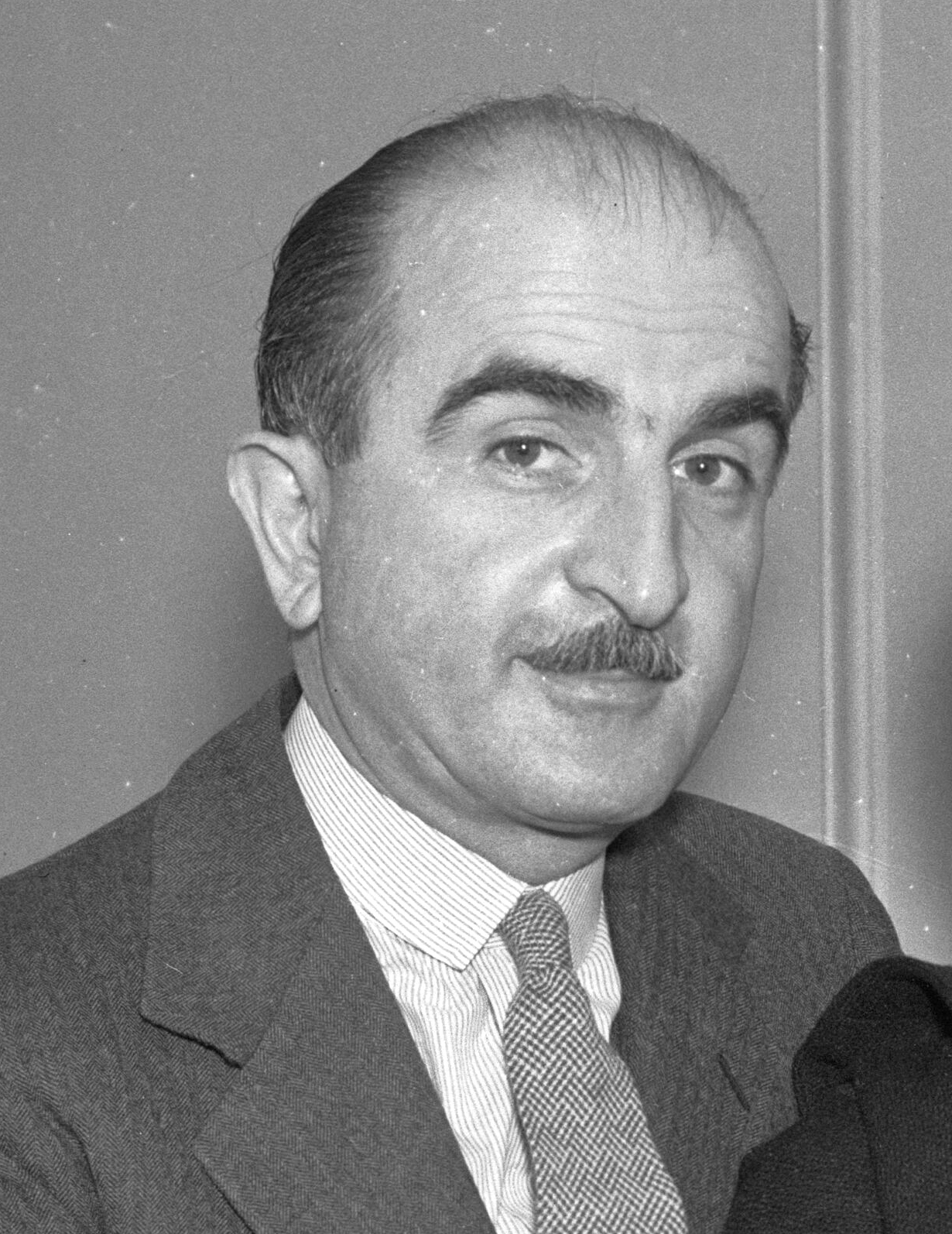
Georges V. Matchabelli

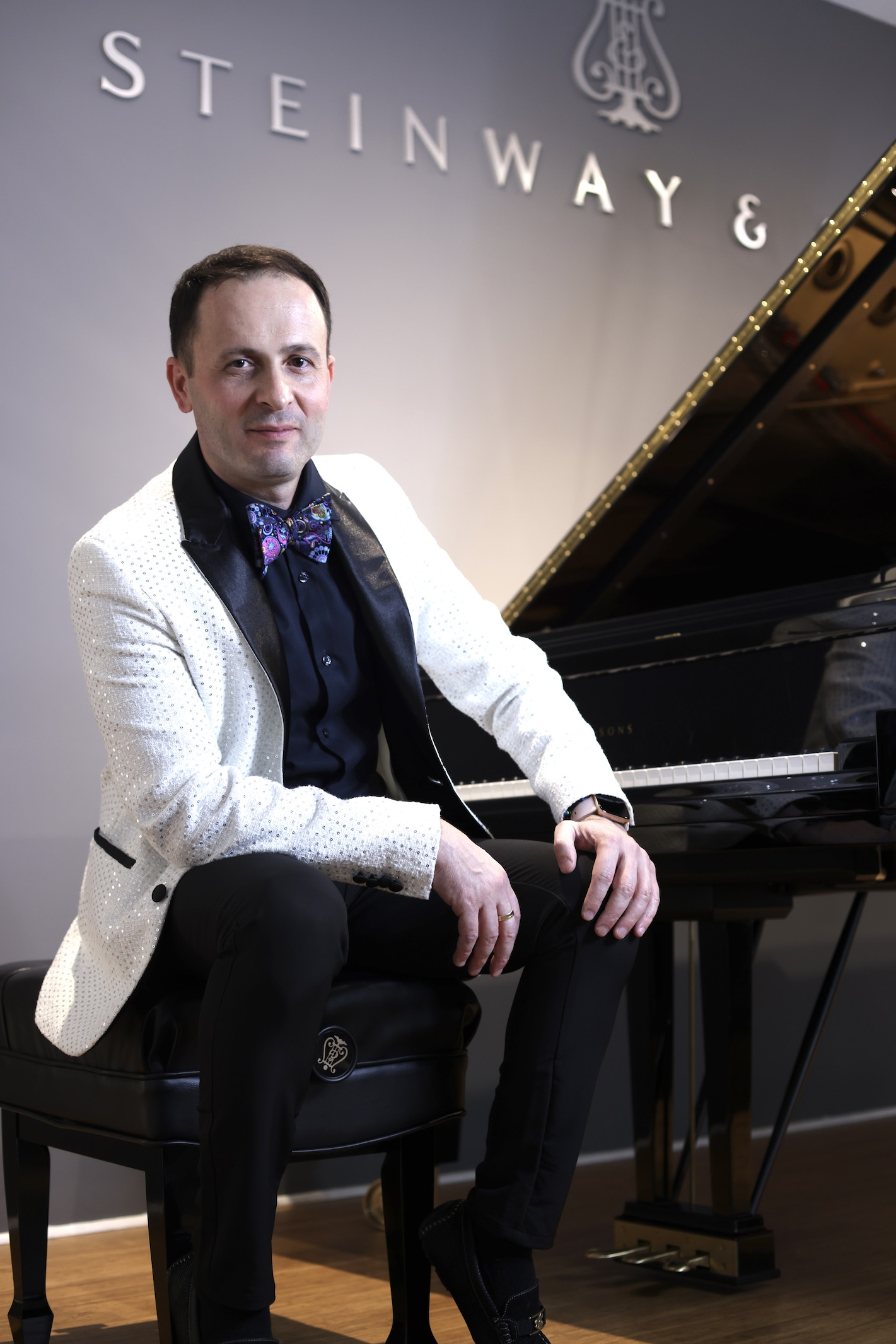
Giorgi Latso

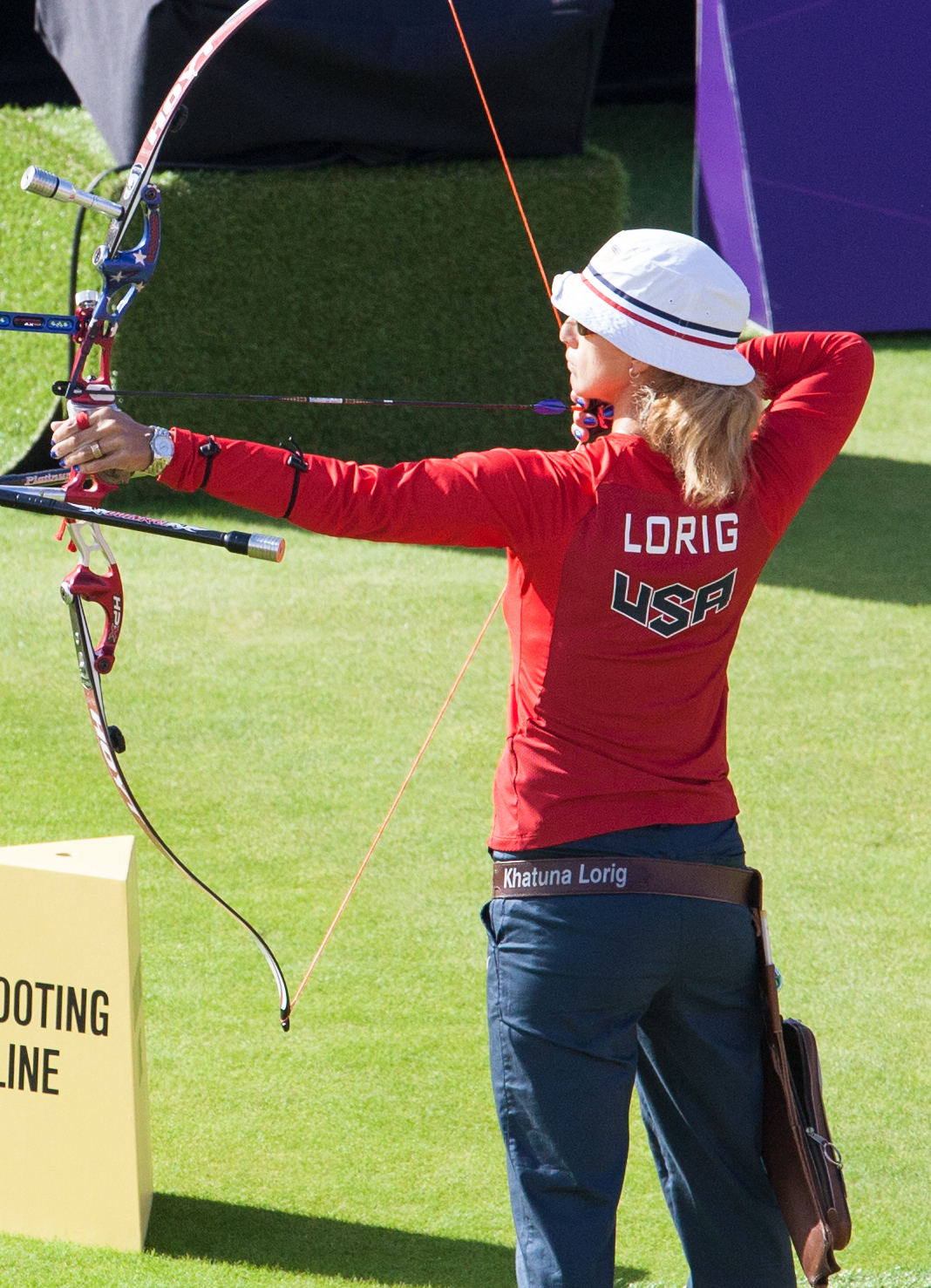
Khatuna Lorig

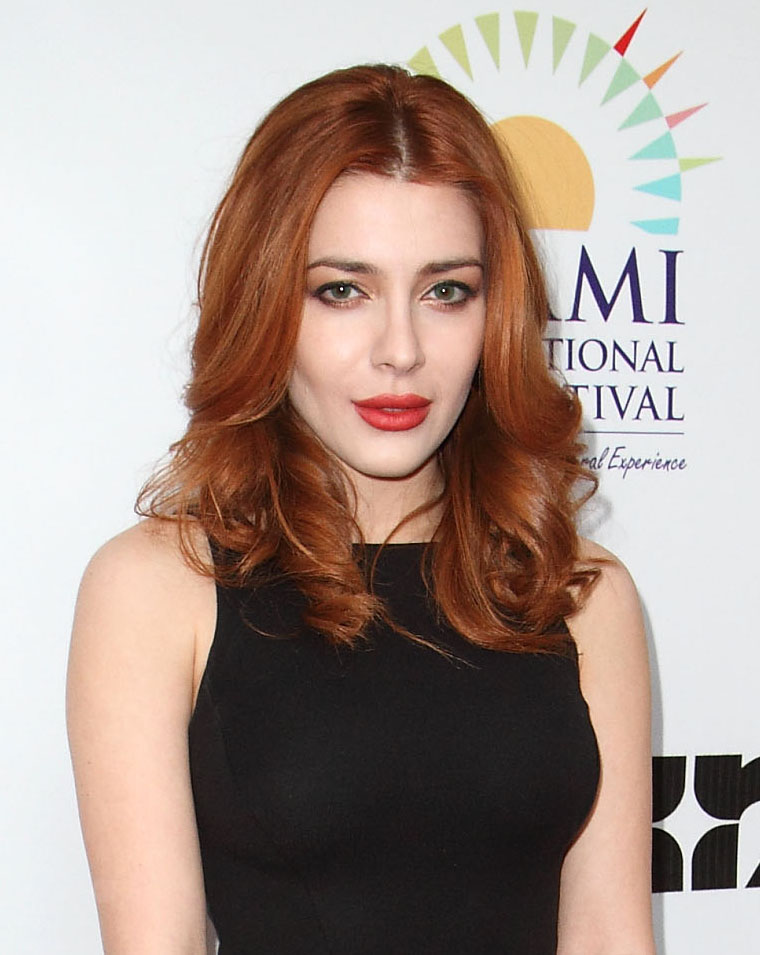
Elena Satine

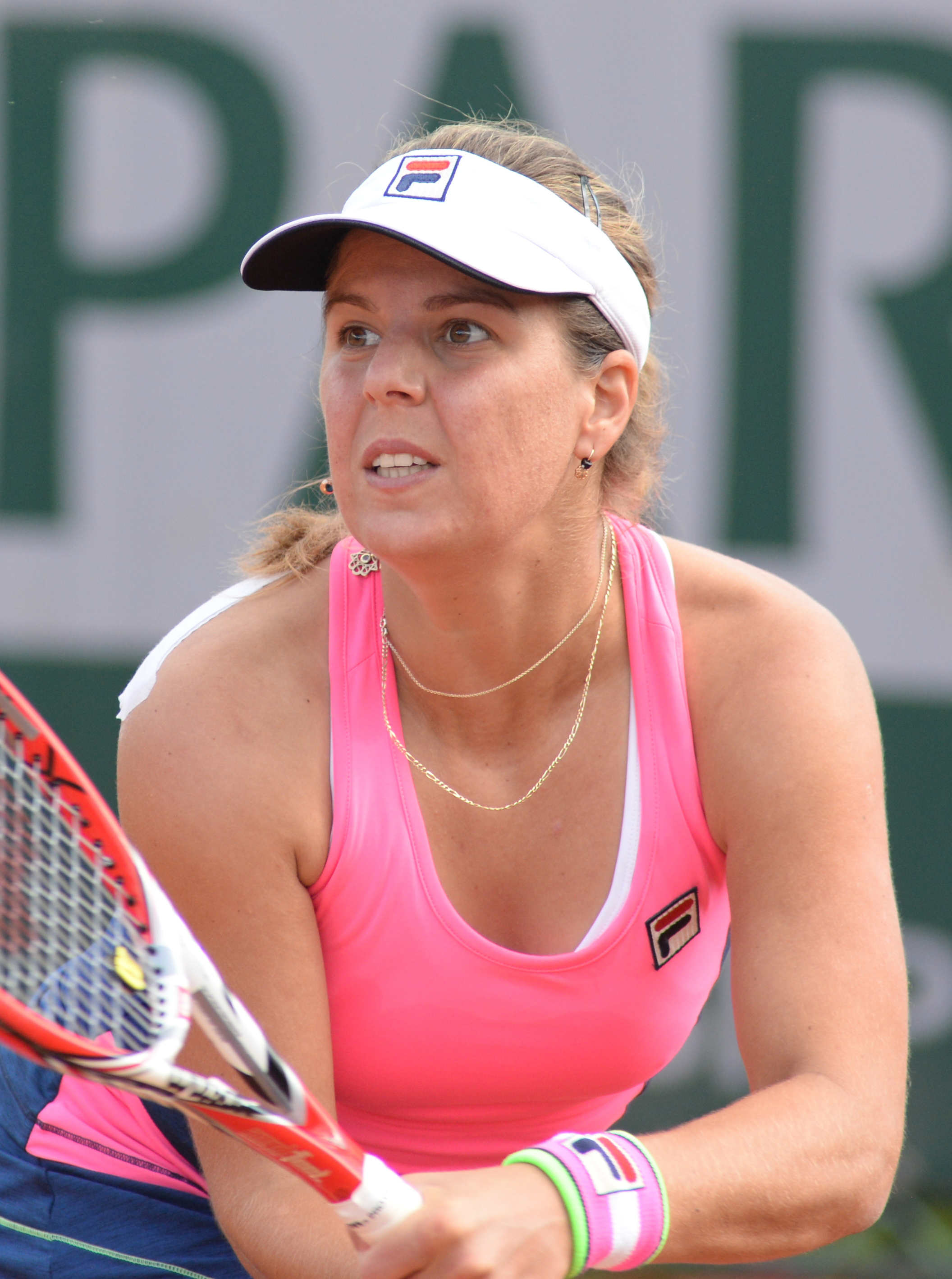
Anna Tatishvili

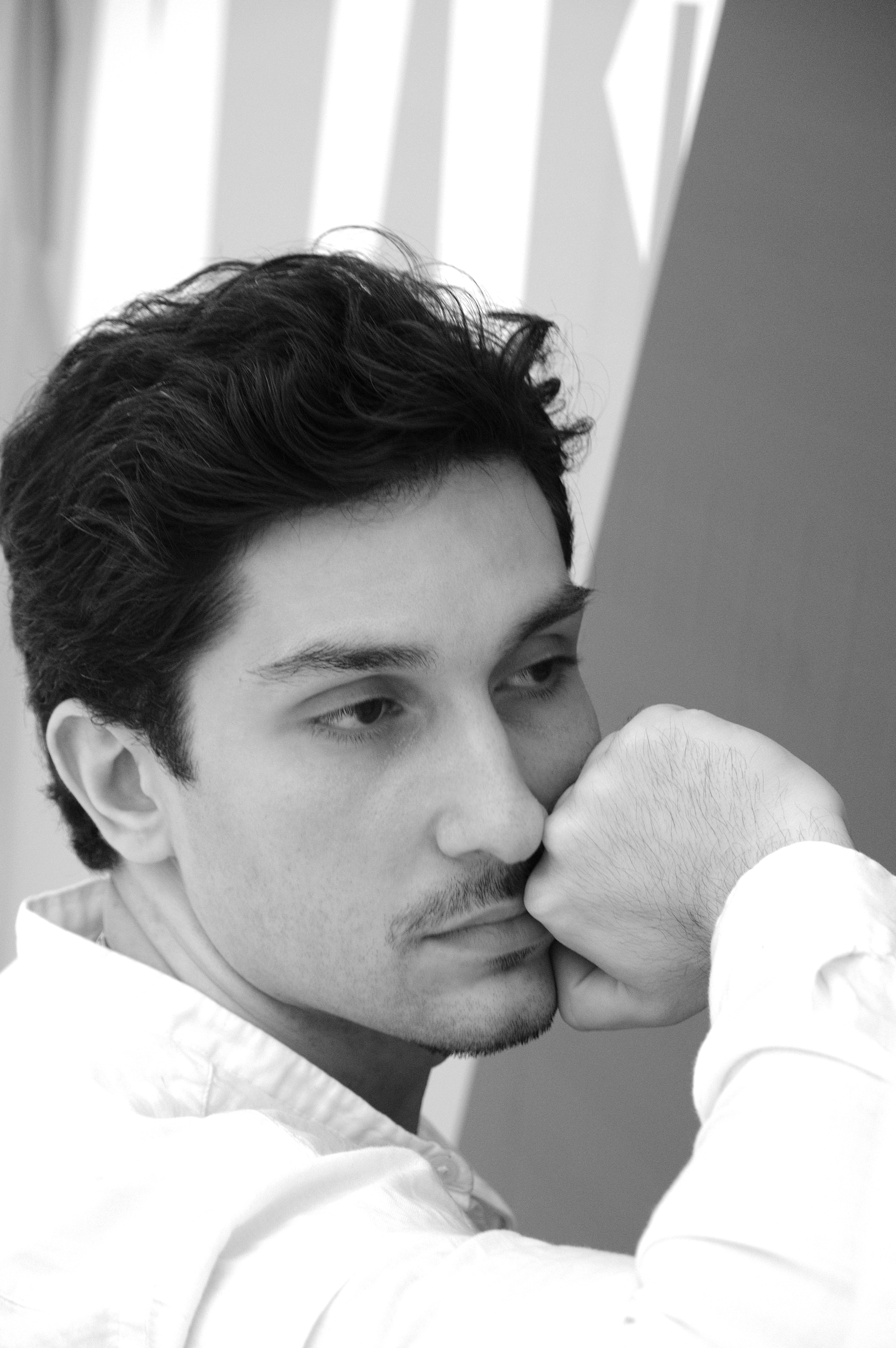
Levan Songulashvili

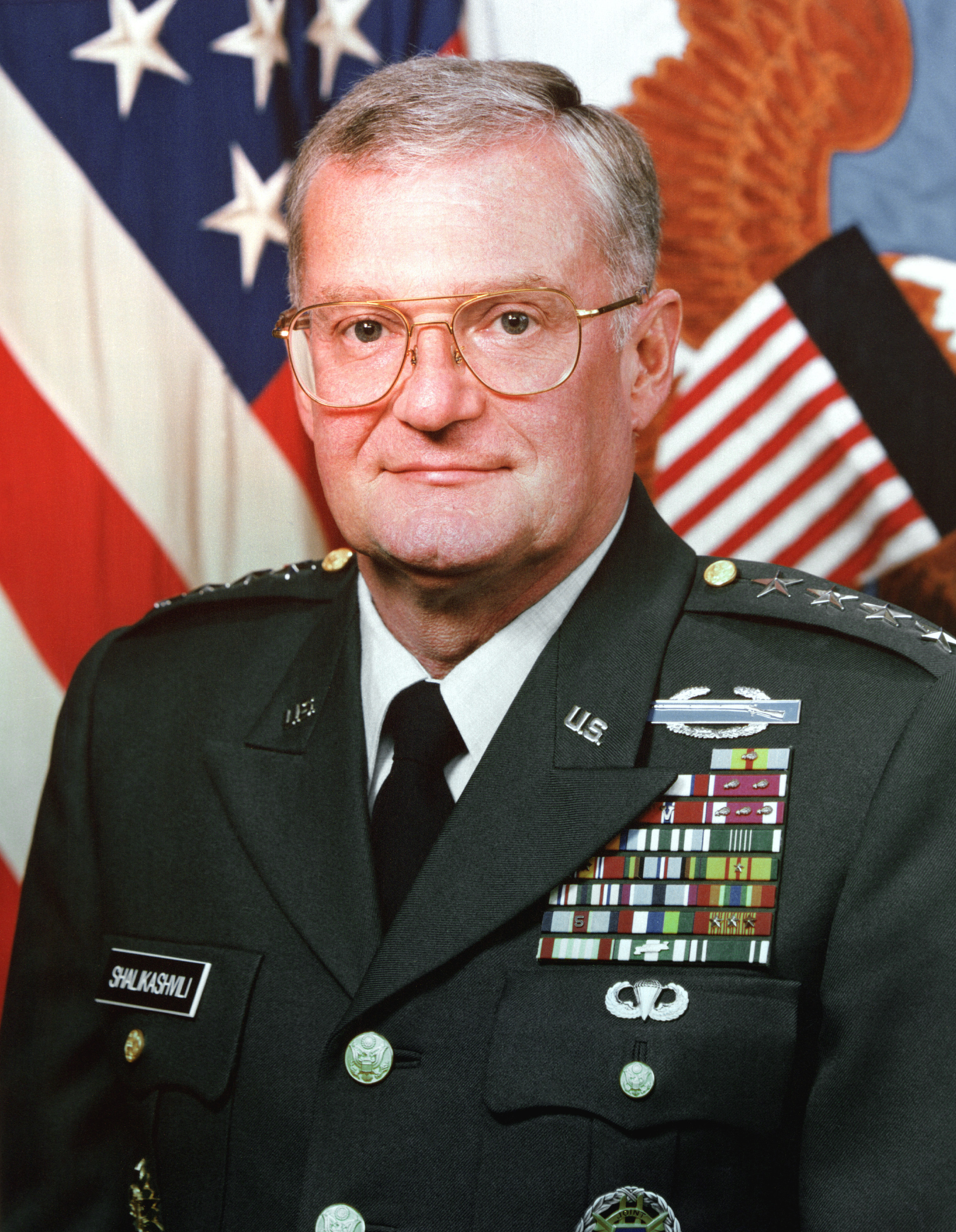
John Shalikashvili

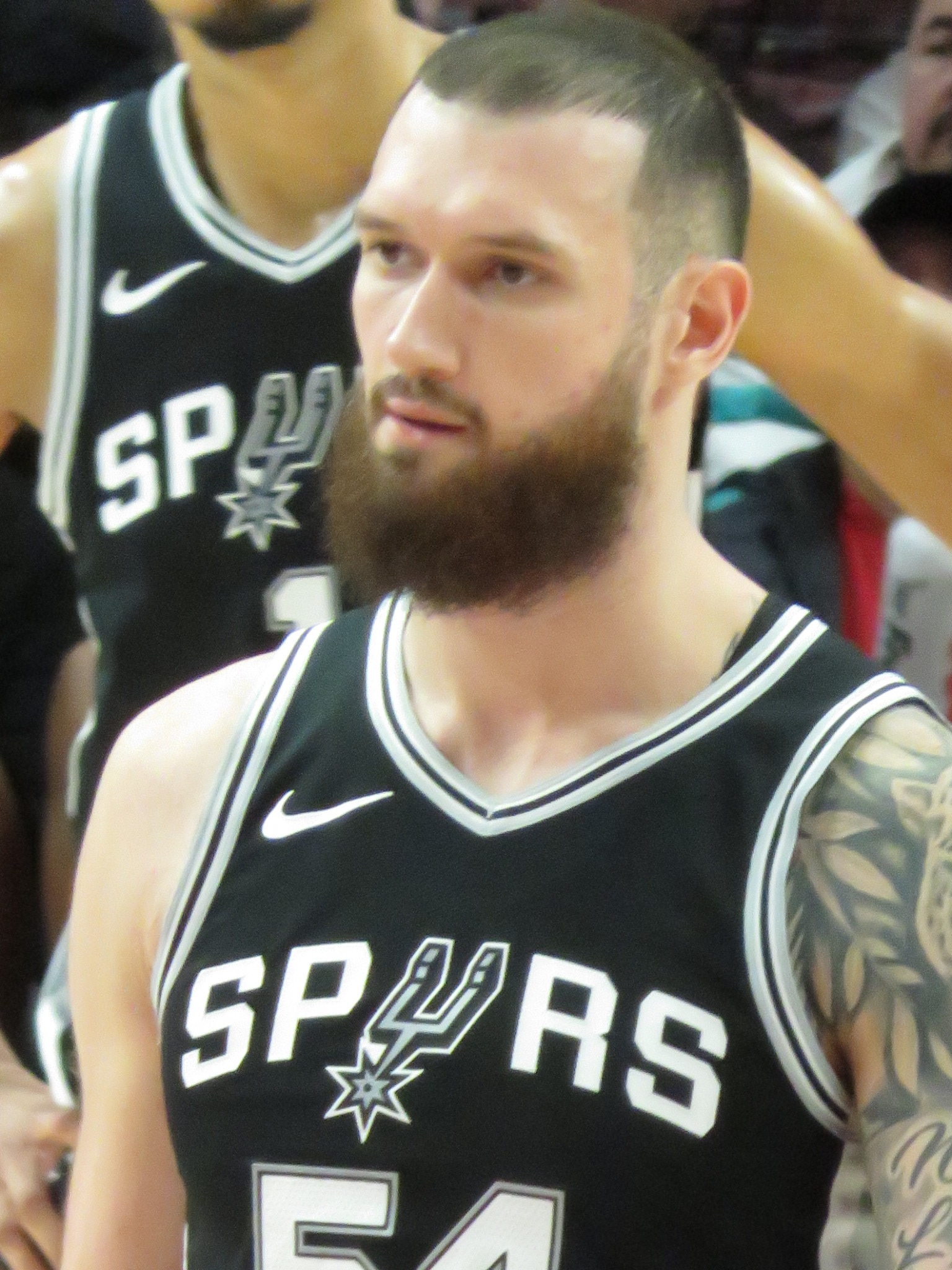
Sandro Mamukelashvili

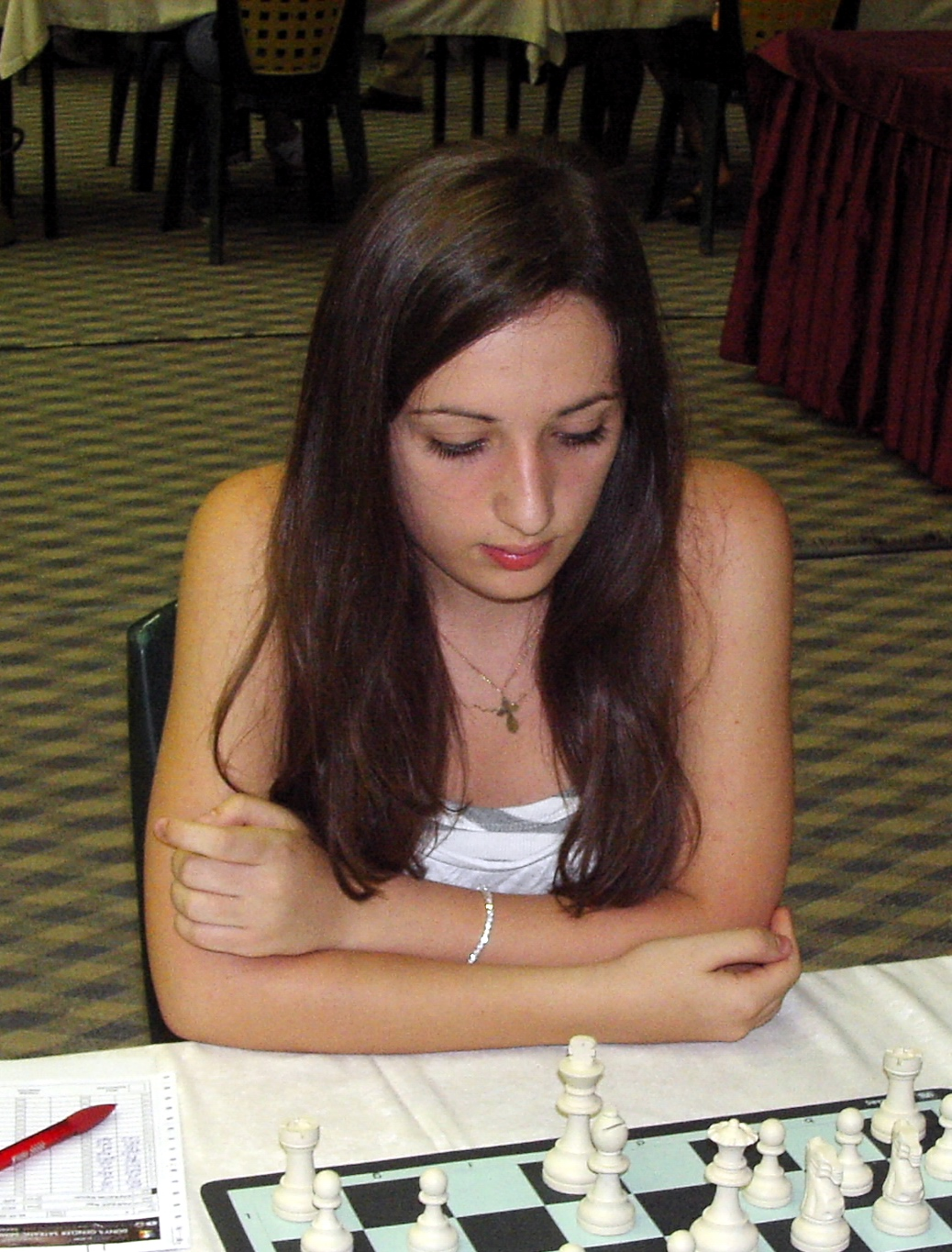
Nazí Paikidze

== See also ==
- Georgia–United States relations
- Armenian Americans
