= Central nervous system fatigue =

Associated with concentration changes in synaptic neurotransmitters in the CNS

Central nervous system fatigue, or central fatigue, is a form of fatigue that is associated with changes in the synaptic concentration of neurotransmitters within the central nervous system (CNS; including the brain and spinal cord) which affects exercise performance and muscle function and cannot be explained by peripheral factors that affect muscle function. In healthy individuals, central fatigue can occur from prolonged exercise and is associated with neurochemical changes in the brain, involving (but not limited to) serotonin (5-HT), noradrenaline, and dopamine. The roles of dopamine, noradrenaline, and serotonin in CNS fatigue are unclear, as pharmacological manipulation of these systems has yielded mixed results. Central fatigue plays an important role in endurance sports and also highlights the importance of proper nutrition in endurance athletes.

== Neurochemical mechanisms ==
Existing experimental methods have provided enough evidence to suggest that variations in synaptic serotonin, noradrenaline, and dopamine are significant drivers of central nervous system fatigue. An increased synaptic dopamine concentration in the CNS is strongly ergogenic (promotes exercise performance). Paradoxically, however, direct dopamine agonists such as bromocriptine and pramipexole have caused opposite, pro-fatigue effects in healthy humans.

=== Noradrenaline ===
Manipulation of norepinephrine suggests it may actually play a role in creating a feeling of fatigue. Reboxetine, an NRI, decreased time to fatigue and increased subjective feelings of fatigue. This may be explained by a paradoxical decrease in adrenergic activity led by feedback mechanisms.

=== Serotonin ===
In the brain, serotonin is a neurotransmitter and regulates arousal, behavior, sleep, and mood, among other things. During prolonged exercise where central nervous system fatigue is present, serotonin levels in the brain are higher than normal physiological conditions; these higher levels can increase perceptions of effort and peripheral muscle fatigue. The increased synthesis of brain serotonin occurs because of a higher proportion of tryptophan, the serotonin precursor, in the blood and which results in larger amounts of tryptophan crossing the blood–brain barrier. An important factor of serotonin synthesis is the transport mechanism of tryptophan across the blood–brain barrier. The transport mechanism for tryptophan is shared with the branched chain amino acids (BCAAs), leucine, isoleucine, and valine. During extended exercise, BCAAs are consumed for skeletal muscle contraction, allowing for greater transport of tryptophan across the blood–brain barrier. None of the components of the serotonin synthesis reaction are saturated under normal physiological conditions, allowing for the increased production of the neurotransmitter. However the failure of BCAAs to decrease time to fatigue consistently limit this hypothesis. This may be due to a counter-acting mechanism: BCAAs also limit the uptake of tyrosine, another aromatic amino acid, like tryptophan. Tyrosine is a precursor to catecholamine, which enhances performance drive.

=== Dopamine ===
Dopamine is a neurotransmitter that regulates arousal, motivation, muscular coordination, and endurance performance, among other things. Dopamine levels have been found to be lower after prolonged exercise. A decrease in dopamine can decrease athletic performance as well as mental motivation. Dopamine itself cannot cross the blood brain barrier and must be synthesized within the brain. In rats bred for running, increased activity of the ventral tegmental area have been observed, and VTA activity correlates with voluntary wheel running. As the VTA is an area dense in dopaminergic neurons that project to many areas of the brain, this suggests that dopaminergic neurotransmission drives physical performance. Further supporting this theory is the fact that dopamine reuptake inhibitors as well as norepinephrine dopamine reuptake inhibitors are able to increase exercise performance, especially in the heat.

=== Acetylcholine ===
Acetylcholine is required for the generation of muscular force. In the central nervous system, acetylcholine modulates arousal and temperature regulation. It also may play a role in central fatigue. During exercise, levels of acetylcholine drop. This is due to a decrease in plasma choline levels. However, there have been conflicting results in studies about the effect of acetylcholine on fatigue. One study found that plasma choline levels had dropped 40% after the subjects ran the Boston Marathon. Another study found that choline supplementation did not improve time to exhaustion. This study also found that plasma choline levels had not changed in either the placebo or the choline supplemented groups. More research is needed to investigate acetylcholine's effects on fatigue.

=== Cytokines ===
Cytokines can manipulate neurotransmissions creating sickness behavior, characterized by malaise and fatigue. In animal models, IL-1b stimulates serotonin release and increases activity of GABA. Lipopolysaccharide challenges also inhibit activity of histaminergic and dopaminergic neurons.

=== Ammonia ===
Increased circulating levels of ammonia may alter brain function and result in fatigue. One hypothesized reason that BCAAs fail to increase exercise performance is due to increased oxidation of BCAAs in supplementation that results in increased fatigue, canceling out the effects on serotonin receptors.

== Manipulation ==
Controlling central nervous system fatigue can help scientists develop a deeper understanding of fatigue as a whole. Numerous approaches have been taken to manipulate neurochemical levels and behavior. In sports, nutrition plays a large role in athletic performance. In addition to fuel, many athletes consume performance-enhancing drugs including stimulants in order to boost their abilities.

=== Dopamine reuptake and release agents ===
Amphetamine is a stimulant that has been found to improve both physical and cognitive performance. Amphetamine blocks the reuptake of dopamine and norepinephrine, which delays the onset of fatigue by increasing the amount of dopamine, despite the concurrent increase in norepinephrine, in the central nervous system. Amphetamine is a widely used substance among collegiate athletes for its performance enhancing qualities, as it can improve muscle strength, reaction time, acceleration, anaerobic exercise performance, power output at fixed levels of perceived exertion, and endurance.

Methylphenidate has also been shown to increase exercise performance in time to fatigue and time trial studies.

=== Caffeine ===
Caffeine is the most widely consumed stimulant in North America. Caffeine causes the release of epinephrine from the adrenal medulla. In small doses, caffeine can improve endurance. It has also been shown to delay the onset of fatigue in exercise. The most probable mechanism for the delay of fatigue is through the obstruction of adenosine receptors in the central nervous system. Adenosine is a neurotransmitter that decreases arousal and increases sleepiness. By preventing adenosine from acting, caffeine removes a factor that promotes rest, and delays fatigue.

=== Carbohydrates ===
Carbohydrates are the main source of energy in organisms for metabolism. They are an important source of fuel in exercise. A study conducted by the Institute of Food, Nutrition, and Human Health at Massey University investigated the effect of consuming a carbohydrate and electrolyte solution on muscle glycogen use and running capacity on subjects that were on a high carbohydrate diet. The group that consumed the carbohydrate and electrolyte solution before and during exercise experienced greater endurance capacity. This could not be explained by the varying levels of muscle glycogen; however, higher plasma glucose concentration may have led to this result. Dr. Stephen Bailey posits that the central nervous system can sense the influx of carbohydrates and reduces the perceived effort of the exercise, allowing for greater endurance capacity.

=== Branched-chain amino acids ===
Several studies have attempted to decrease the synthesis of serotonin by administering branched-chain amino acids and inhibiting the transport of tryptophan across the blood brain barrier. The studies performed resulted in little or no change in performance between increased BCAA intake and placebo groups. One study in particular administered a carbohydrate solution and a carbohydrate + BCAA solution. Both of the groups were able to run for longer before fatigue compared to the water placebo group. However, both the carbohydrate and the carbohydrate + BCAA groups had no differences in their performance. Branch-chained amino acid supplementation has proven to have little to no effect on performance. There has been little success utilizing neurotransmitter precursors to control central nervous system fatigue.

One review hypothesized that the inconsistency with BCAA administration was the result of ammonia accumulation as a result of increased BCAA oxidation.

=== Neurostimulation ===
Non-invasive neurostimulation technologies represent a cutting-edge paradigm in central fatigue mitigation, offering potentially significant breakthroughs for both sports science and clinical medicine. Clinical study presented evidence of fatigue reduction applying bilateral anodal transcranial direct current stimulation (tDCS) to the somatosensory cortex. Data showed a mean 26% reduction in fatigue severity in patients with multiple sclerosis, confirming the restoration of sensorimotor balance and the long-term efficacy of the treatment. Another study, a double-blind, randomized controlled trial, evaluated the effects of high-definition transcranial direct current stimulation (HD-tDCS) targeting the primary motor cortex (M1) in patients with chronic fatigue following Long COVID. HD-tDCS administration led to a statistically significant reduction in total fatigue scores, as measured by the Modified Fatigue Impact Scale (MFIS), and notable improvements in cognitive and psychosocial domains compared with the placebo group. Utilizing the Natural Neurostimulation approach, mimicking endogenous neurostimulation (similar to maternal-fetal interactions observed during gestation) reduces central fatigue by enhancing communication between the central nervous system and peripheral muscles. This biomimetic technique restores balance to the immuno-neuro-endocrine axis, regulating the rhythmic release of inhibitory neurotransmitters and hormones. These hormonal surges directly boost signaling across the neuromuscular pathway to peripheral skeletal muscles.

== Role ==
Central nervous system fatigue is a key component in preventing peripheral muscle injury. The brain has numerous receptors, such as osmoreceptors, to track dehydration, nutrition, and body temperature. With that information as well as peripheral muscle fatigue information, the brain can reduce the quantity of motor commands sent from the central nervous system. This is crucial in order to protect the homeostasis of the body and to keep it in a proper physiological state capable of full recovery. The reduction of motor commands sent from the brain increases the amount of perceived effort an individual experiences. By forcing the body through a higher perceived intensity, the individual becomes more likely to cease exercise by means of exhaustion. Perceived effort is greatly influenced by the intensity of corollary discharge from the motor cortex that affects the primary somatosensory cortex. Endurance athletes learn to listen to their body. Protecting organs from potentially dangerous core temperatures and nutritional lows is an important brain function. Central nervous system fatigue alerts the athlete when physiological conditions are not optimal so either rest or refueling can occur. It is important to avoid hyperthermia and dehydration, as they are detrimental to athletic performance and can be fatal.
