= Georgians in Germany =

Total population
- 40,885

Languages
- Predominantly German and Georgian

Religion
- Eastern Orthodox

According to the Federal Statistical Office of Germany, 40,885 Georgians lived in Germany in 2024. The number rose continuously from 2014 (19,142) to 2023, peaking at 46,505, before declining to the 2024 level.

== See also ==
- Georgia–Germany relations
