= Nino Kipiani =

Georgian lawyer

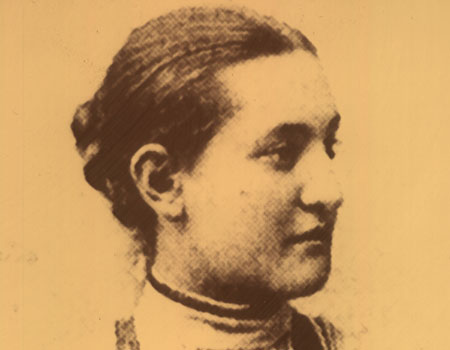
Nino Kipiani

Nino Kipiani (Georgian: ნინო ყიფიანი; 1877–1920) was a Georgian lawyer and politician. A graduate of the law school in Brussels, she was the first female lawyer in the Russian Empire. As a result of her calls for the liberation of Georgia, in 1907 she was forced to move abroad, living first in Brussels with her father and then in Italy. She returned to her home country in the early 1920s.

== Biography ==
A granddaughter of the Georgian statesman Dimitri Kipiani and the daughter of Niko Kipiani and Anastasia Eristavi, Nino Kipiani was born in Kutaisi in 1877. She attended the St. Nino private school in Tbilisi, but for unknown reasons was expelled in 1898. She then studied law in Brussels, becoming the first female lawyer not only in Georgia but in the Russian Empire. In the early 1900s, she was arrested several times for her involvement in the nationalist movement.

Her interest in independence was expressed as early as July 1903 in a card she sent from Brussels: "Why do we not have the will to insist on full independence from Russia? Why do not we allow our Georgia, which is the oldest of all the states and has the greatest history, to be free?"
