= Georgian name =

Typical names used by ethnic Georgians

A Georgian name (Georgian: ქართული გვარ-სახელი, romanized: kartuli gvar-sakheli) consists of a given name and a surname (Note: Georgians, although very rarely, may also have middle names.) used by ethnic Georgians.

== Given names ==
According to the Public Service Hall the most common Georgian names are:

Males: Giorgi, Davit, Zurab, Levan, Aleksandre, Irakli, Mikheil, Tamaz, Nikoloz and Avtandil.

Females: Nino, Tamar, Mariam, Maia, Nana, Ketevan, Natela, Manana, Natia, Eka and Ana.

== Surnames ==
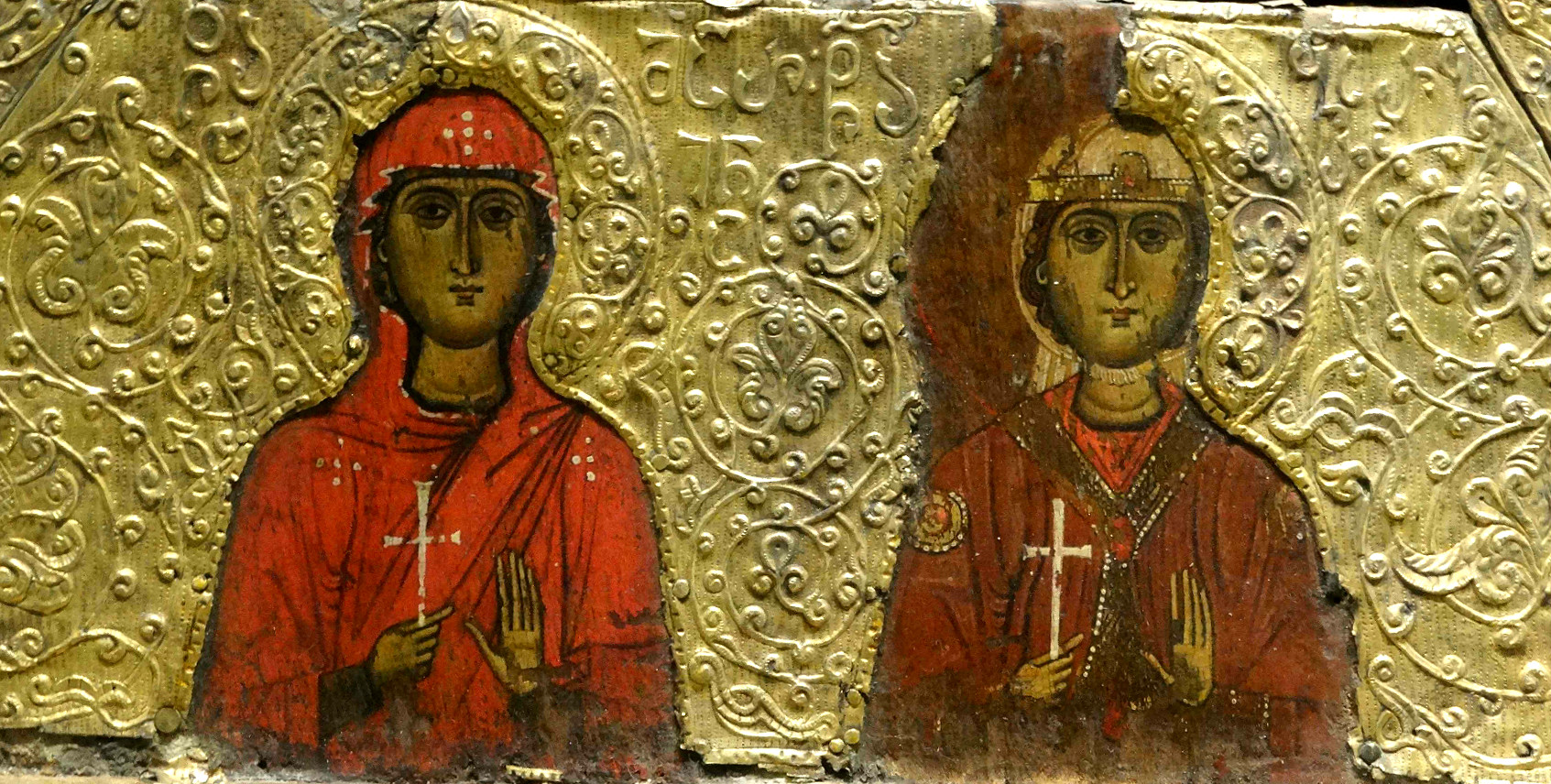
Saint Nino (left) and Saint George (right) depicted on a medieval icon kept at the Mestia museum. Nino is the most common feminine name in Georgia, as she converted the Georgians to Christianity in the early 4th century. Giorgi (i. e. George) is the most common masculine name in Georgia and is considered to be the patron saint of the country.

Georgian surnames are derived either from patronymics or, less frequently, from toponyms, with addition of various suffixes.

Georgian suffixes vary by region. The most common Georgian suffixes are:

- -shvili (-შვილი): meaning "child": from western and eastern Georgia. E.g. Baratashvili, Andronikashvili, Guramishvili, etc. The suffix is also common among the Georgian Jews.
- -dze (-ძე): meaning "son": from western and eastern Georgia. E.g. Abashidze, Arveladze, Kaladze, etc.
- -eli (-ელი): meaning "from (place)": from eastern and western Georgia. E.g. Jaqeli, Tsereteli, Amashukeli, etc.
- -uri and -uli (-ური) and (-ული): from mountainous eastern Georgia. E.g. Donauri, Burduli, etc.
- -ani (-ანი): Svan surname from mountainous western Georgia. E.g. Dadeshkeliani, Dadiani, Kipiani, etc.
- -ia, -ua, -va and -skiri (-ია), (-უა), (-ვა) and (-სკირი): Mingrelian surname from western Georgia. E.g. Abakelia, Chichua, Gvazava, Papaskiri etc.
- -shi (-ში): Laz surname from western Georgia. E.g. Tugushi, Khalvashi, Jashi, etc.
- -khi (-ხი): from southern Georgia. E.g. Meskhi, Lashkhi, etc.
- -oni (-ონი): from region of Tao-Klarjeti (modern-day Turkey), historical south-western Georgia. E.g. Bagrationi.
- -ti (-ტი): from western Georgia. E.g. Glonti, Jgenti, Jibuti, Kiuti etc.

The first recorded Georgian surnames date to the 7th–8th century. They were mostly toponymic in nature (such as Surameli, Machabeli etc.), patronymic, or derived from the profession, social status, position, or title, which was hereditary in the family (such as Amilakhvari, Amirejibi, Eristavi etc.). Beginning from the 13th century, the surnames became more frequently based upon patronymics, a tradition which became almost universal in the 17th–18th century. Some of the Georgian surnames indicate ethnicity or regional origin of the family, and are also generated as patronymics. Examples are Kartvelishvili ("child of Kartveli", i.e., Georgian), Megrelishvili ("child of Megreli", i.e., Mingrelian), Cherkezishvili ("child of Cherkezi", i.e., Circassian), Apkhazishvili ("child of Apkhazi", i.e., Abkhazian), Somkhishvili ("child of Somekhi", i.e., Armenian), Berdzenishvili ("child of Berdzeni", i.e., Greek), Prangishvili ("child of Prangi", i.e., Frank, here in the general sense of Western European).

There are some very rare Georgian surnames like Jolbordi, Galogre, Lapachi, Molodini, Shermadini, Sivsive, Megvinetukhutsesi etc.

According to the Public Service Hall the most common Georgian surnames are: Beridze, Kapanadze, Gelashvili, Maisuradze, Giorgadze, Lomidze, Tsiklauri, Bolkvadze, Kvaratskhelia and Nozadze.
