= Akhvlediani =

Coat of arms of the Akhvlediani family

The House of Akhvlediani (Georgian: ახვლედიანი) is the name of an ancient Georgian noble family that later also became Incorporated into the Russian nobility with the title of Knyaz in the Russian Empire. Akhvlediani is also a Georgian surname.

== The origin of the Akhvlediani family ==
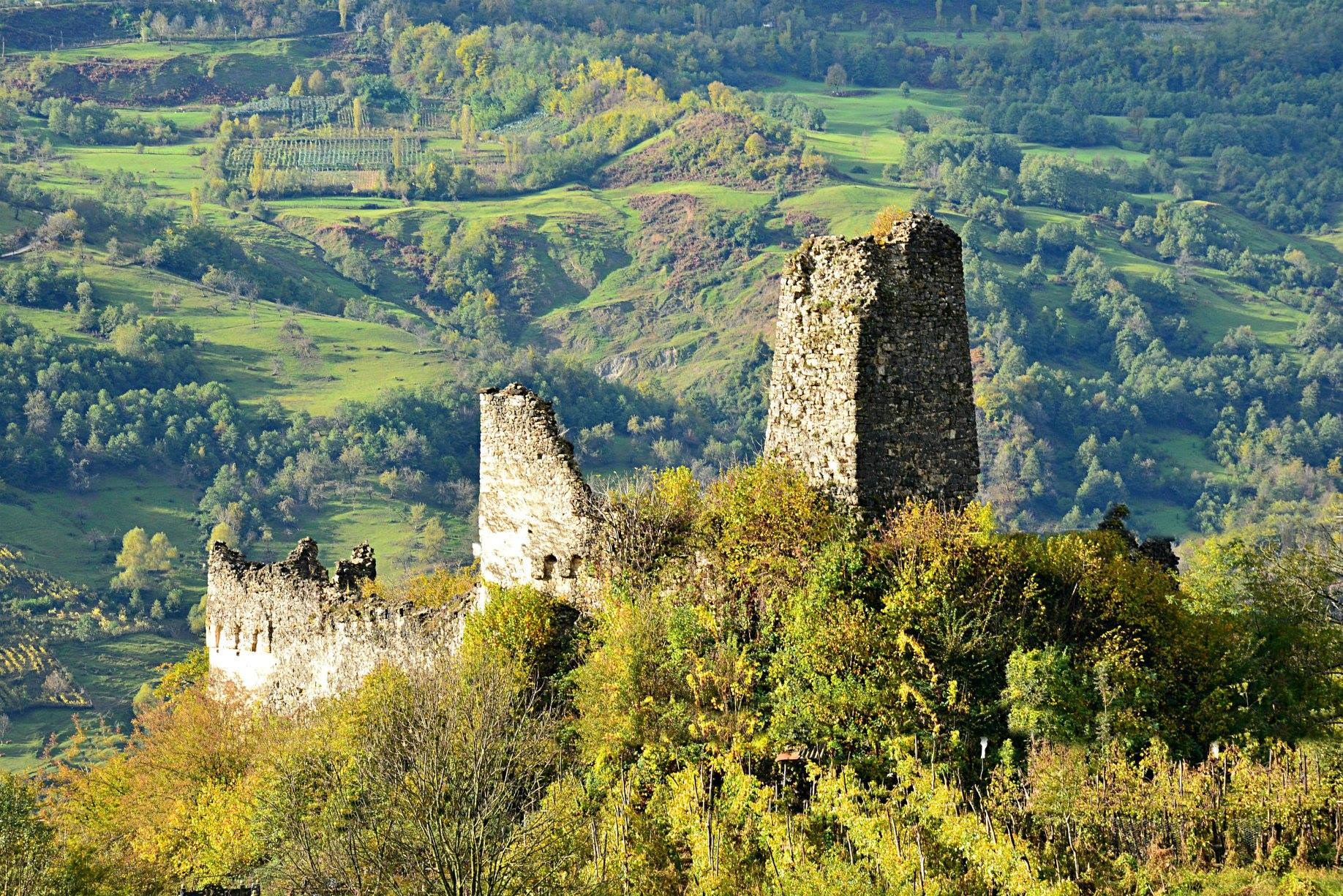
Orbeli Castle, Georgia

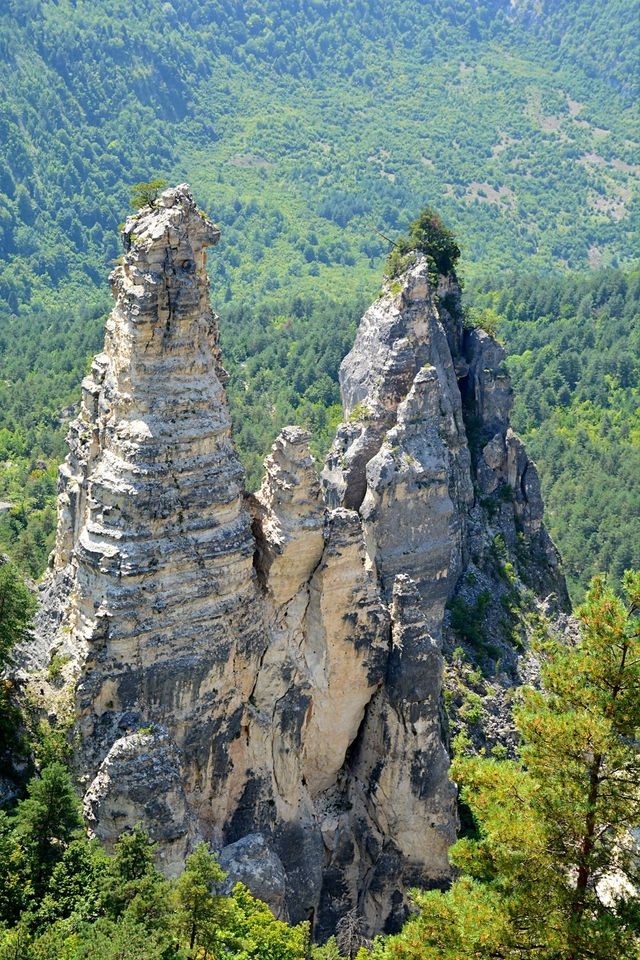
Sairme Pillars

The ancient Akhvlediani dynasty originated in the Early Feudal ages and had fully formed in the 6th and 7th centuries A. D. It etymologically descends from the Svan proper name Akhvild (Akhavild). When the suffix -iani was added, it became the Georgian surname Akhvlediani. The dynasty members held fairly significant titles. The dynasty's historical place of origin is Lechkhumi. There is an Akhvlediani fortress in Lechkhumi, named Kahvildash, which roughly translates to “made of stone.”

Svan linguistic origin is easily traced in Lechkhumi toponymic terms (in Elia, Lailashi, Leshkashi, Okureshi, Labdashi, Chkhuduashi, etc.), and local surnames also point to the Svan origin (Burjaniani, Gasviani, Gvishiani, Gurguchiani, Gelovani, Lekveheliani, Davituliani, Chkhetiani, Akhvlediani, etc.).

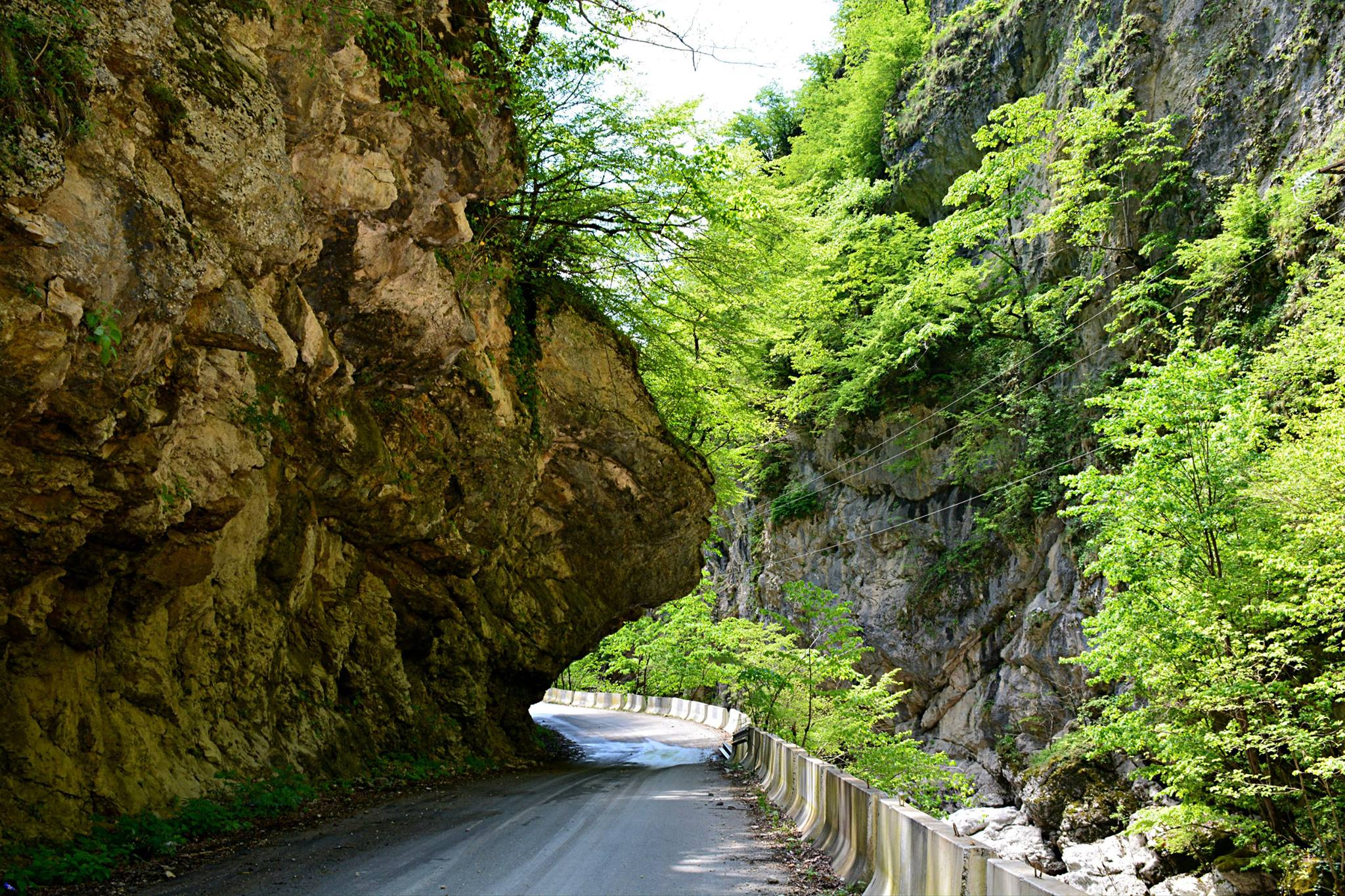
Orpiri Rocky Pass

== The first mentions in the sources ==
The oldest source containing the name Akhvlediani is a Book of Favour (Book of Mercy), dated around 1639–1659. It was commissioned by Alexander III of Imereti for Giorgi and Khosia Akhvlediani and kept at Tsageri Cathedral. A copy of the document has been printed at the Asiatic Museum in St. Petersburg, Russia. The document states: "So “Book of Favour” of the crowned Tsar Alexander, granted to Giorgi and Khosia Akhvlediani, to their children and future children, for their selfless service. Your plea has been heard and you are hereby granted: the fortress of Gvirishi with the Gvirishi peasants, the village of Tskhukusheri whole, Tvishi".

Academician Ekvtime Takaishvili stated, “Khosia Akhvlediani is a well-known person in Georgian history and a contemporary of King Bagrat IV of Imereti. Khosia Akhvlediani hid the rightful king Bagrat IV after he was dethroned by Darejan of Kakheti. One theory has it that Khosia Akhvlediani, together with Sekhnia Chkheidze and Gedeon Lortkipanidze of Gelati, led a conspiracy against the queen. Following a prearranged plan, Khosia and his collaborators assassinated Darejan”.

== The social structure ==
The social structure and hierarchy of Akhvlediani look diverse and varied, encompassing all strata and classes of society: serfs, clergy, nobles, and princes. Akhvlediani from Lechkhumi made up the bulk of the dynasty's princes.

Their ancestral home was in the village of Aghvi in Tsageri Municipality. Various certificates and documents referencing Akhvlediani are found in church records from the 19th century, stored at the Central Historical Archive of Georgia and the Kutaisi Central Archive.

According to the archive records, Akhvlediani princes owned estates with serfs in the villages of Alpana, Achara (located near Kutaisi, not to be confused with the Region of Adjara), Zogishi, Tsagera and Ghvardia as of 1904. Akhvlediani nobles lived in Kenashi, Sanorchi, Aghvi, Nakuraleshi, Nasperi, Laskhana, Lesindi, Dekhviri, Chkhuteli, Lukhvano, and Zogishi.

According to the "Church Confessions", Akhvlediani in the first half of the 19th century were represented by the so-called throne's nobles and prince's nobles. In the middle of the century, three groups of aznauri (lower-rank nobles) emerged in Georgia. Throne nobles enjoyed greater privileges and influence than those dependent on the princes or the church. In all cases, dependency hinged on one thing: aznauri held an estate given by their liege. They had the right to leave, provided they gave up the land and the serfs living there. Starting from the 19th century, the Russian government transferred these nobles to state ownership. Since then, they were referred to as state nobles.

Akhvlediani migrated from Lechkhumi to neighbouring Racha, Imereti, Samegrelo, Guria, Adjara and other regions due to a variety of socioeconomic reasons.

== Modern period ==
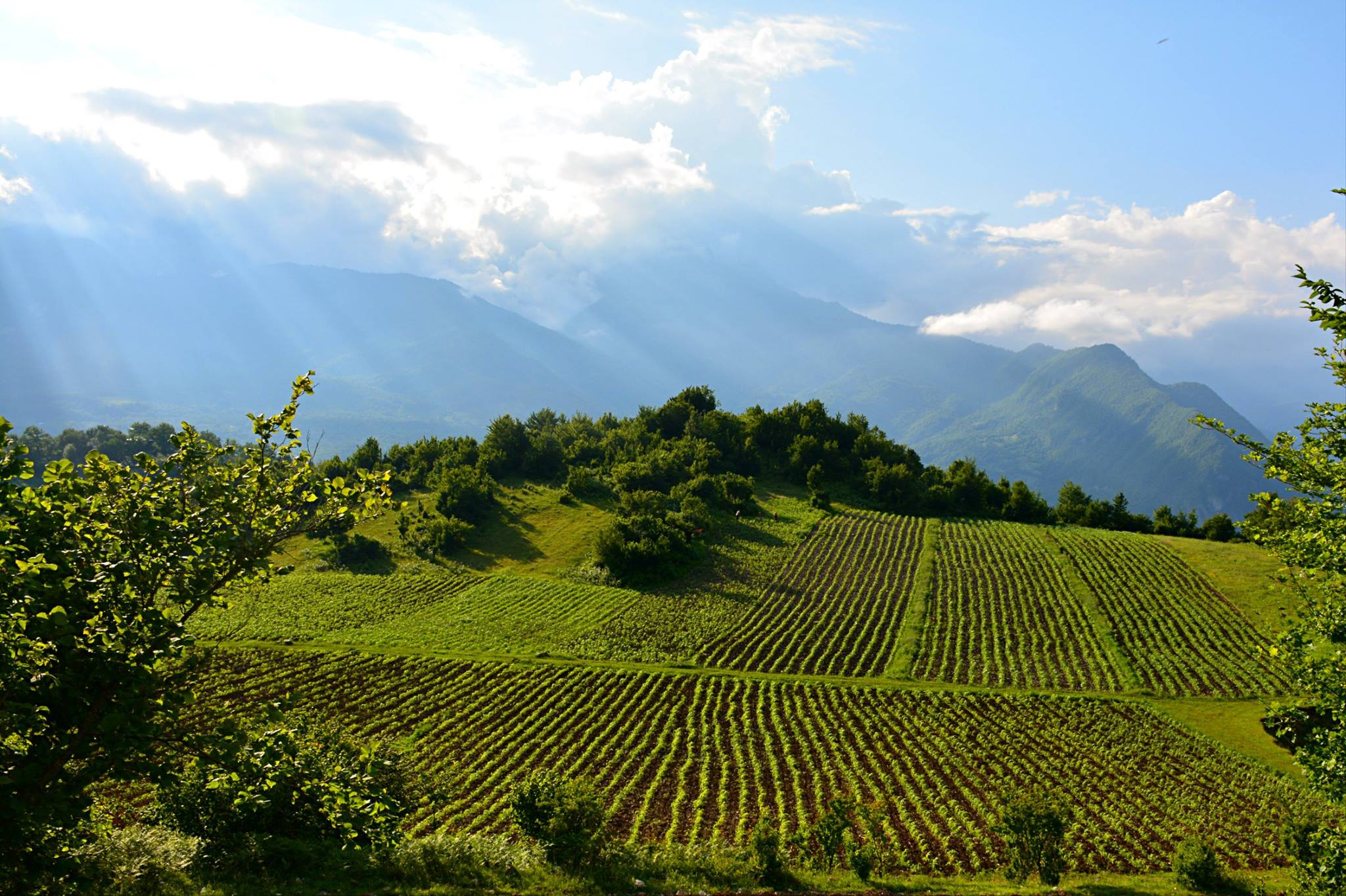
Okureshi Vineyards

According to 1997 data, there are currently 4531 Akhvlediani in Georgia.

The prevalence of the surname Akhvlediani
Population center	Number of people
Tbilisi	1171
Kutaisi	1026
Tsageri	670

== Notable people ==
- Daur Akhvlediani (1964–1993), Abkhaz footballer
- Elene Akhvlediani (1898–1975), Georgian painter
- Erlom Akhvlediani (1933–2012), Georgian novelist and scriptwriter
- Giorgi Akhvlediani (1887–1973), Georgian linguist
- Ruslan Akhvlediani (born 1987), Russian footballer of Georgian origin
- Badri Akhvlediani (born 1972), Georgian footballer
- Levan Akhvlediani (born 1969), Georgian volleyball official
