= Asatiani =

Asatiani (Georgian: ასათიანი) is a Georgian surname that may refer to:

- Kakhi Asatiani (1947–2002), Soviet footballer and manager
- Lado Asatiani (1917–1943), Soviet poet
- Maia Asatiani (born 1977), Georgian TV host
- Malkhaz Asatiani (born 1981), Georgian footballer
- Mikheil Asatiani (1882–1938), Georgian psychiatrist
- Nugzar Asatiani (1937–1992), Soviet fencer
- Tina Asatiani (1918–2011), Armenian physicist
