= Avtandil =

Avtandil (Georgian: ავთანდილ) is a Georgian masculine name of Persian origin meaning "the heart of the motherland". The name was used in the 12th-century Georgian poem The Knight in the Panther's Skin by Shota Rustaveli.

It may refer to:

- Avtandil (designer), Georgian fashion designer
- Avtandil, a character in The Knight in the Panther's Skin, a medieval Georgian epic poem
- Avtandil Beridze, Georgian politician
- Avtandil Chkuaseli, Soviet footballer
- Avtandil Demetrashvili, Georgian jurist and former member of the Constitutional Court
- Avtandil Ebralidze, Georgian footballer
- Avtandil Gartskia, politician in Abkhazia
- Avtandil Gogoberidze, Georgian/Soviet footballer
- Avtandil Gvianidze, Georgian footballer
- Avtandil Jorbenadze, Georgian politician and former politician
- Avtandil Kapanadze, Georgian/Soviet footballer
- Avtandil Kopaliani, Georgian rugby player
- Avtandil Koridze, Georgian wrestler
- Avtandil Khurtsidze, Georgian boxer
- Avtandil Makharadze, Georgian actor
- Avtandil Silagadze, Georgian economist
- Avtandil Tchrikishvili, Georgian judoka
- Avtandil Tskitishvili, Georgian general
- Avtandil Varsimashvili, Georgian film and theatre director
