= Mikheil =

Georgian masculine name

Mikheil (Georgian: მიხეილ) is a Georgian masculine name. It may refer to:

- Mikheil of Georgia, Georgian royal prince, son of King George XII
- Mikheil Kavelashvili, Georgian politician, 6th President of Georgia
- Mikheil Saakashvili, Georgian politician, 3rd President of Georgia
- Mikheil Sarjveladze, Georgian politician, Minister of Health, Labour and Social Affairs of Georgia
- Mikheil Janelidze, Georgian politician, former Foreign Minister of Georgia
- Mikheil Korkia, Georgian basketball player
- Mikheil Gelovani, Georgian actor
- Mikheil Mchedlishvili, Georgian chess grandmaster
- Mikheil Jishkariani, Georgian football player
- Mikheil Javakhishvili, Georgian writer
- Mikheil Giorgadze, Georgian water polo player
- Mikheil Khutsishvili, Georgian football player
- Mikheil Kobakhidze, Georgian film director
- Mikheil Meskhi, Georgian football player
- Mikheil Meskhi, Georgian football player
- Mikheil Ashvetia, Georgian football player
- Mikheil Chiaureli, Georgian actor
- Mikheil Baghaturia, Georgian water polo player
- Mikheil Gachechiladze, Georgian rugby union player
- Mikheil Kalatozishvili, Georgian film director
- Mikheil Tsinamdzghvrishvili, Georgian academic
- Mikheil Bakhtidze, Georgian boxer
- Mikheil Potskhveria, Georgian football player
- Mikheil Kurdiani, Georgian linguist
- Mikheil Makharadze, Georgian politician
- Mikheil Kajaia, Georgian wrestler
- Mikheil Asatiani, Georgian psychiatrist
- Mikheil Batiashvili, Georgian politician
- Mikheil Berishvili, Georgian basketball player
- Mikheil Tsereteli, Georgian historian
- Mikheil Kakhiani, Georgian politician
- Mikheil Tsiklauri, Georgian rugby union player
- Mikheil Machavariani, Georgian politician
- Mikheil Tumanishvili, Georgian theater director
- Mikheil Alania, Georgian rugby union player
- Mikheil Makhviladze, Georgian football player
- Mikheil Bobokhidze, Georgian football player
- Mikheil Vashakidze, Georgian astronomer
- Mikheil Lomtadze, Georgian-Kazakhstani businessman
