= Silagadze =

Silagadze (Georgian: სილაგაძე) is a Georgian surname. Notable people with the surname include:

- Avtandil Silagadze (born 1954), Georgian economist
- Levan Silagadze (born 1976), Georgian football defender
