= Nikolozishvili =

Nikolozishvili (Georgian: ნიკოლაიშვილი) is a Georgian patronymic surname derived from the given name Nikoloz. Notable people with the surname include:

- Nikoloz Nikolozishvili (born 1945), Georgian diplomat, philologist, and historian
