= Levan =

Levan can refer to:

== Places ==
- Levan, Berat, a village in the municipality of Berat, Berat County, Albania
- Levan, Fier, a village in the municipality of Fier, Fier County, Albania
- Levan, Gjirokastër, a village in the municipality of Memaliaj, Gjirokastër County, Albania
- Levan, Utah
- The town of Levan, Inverclyde, United Kingdom
- St Levan, Cornwall, England

== People ==
- Albert Levan (1905–1998), Swedish botanist and geneticist
- Ivy Levan, American singer
- Levan (name), Georgian masculine given name

== Buildings ==
- Castle Levan, is a fortified tower house in Levan area of Gourock, Inverclyde, Scotland.

== Others ==
- Levan Farm was listed on the National Register of Historic Places in 1978.
- Levan polysaccharide, a homopolysaccharide which is composed of D-fructofuranosyl
- A group of fructans produced by bacteria or created by breaking down other kinds of plant fructans, called levan beta 2→6
- LEVAN (Search Engine), an acronym for Learn Everything About Anything, a visual processing search engine developed by the Allen Brain Institute and the University of Washington.
