= Tamaz =

Tamaz (Georgian: თამაზ) is a masculine Georgian given name, an equivalent of Thomas. Notable people with the given name include:

- Tamaz Chiladze (1931–2018), Georgian writer, dramatist and poet
- Tamaz V. Gamkrelidze (1929–2021), Georgian linguist, orientalist, public benefactor, Hittitologist, academician
- Tamaz Gelashvili (born 1978), Georgian chess grandmaster
- Tamaz Gogia (born 1961), Abkhazian government official
- Tamaz Imnaishvili (born 1954), Georgian sport shooter
- Tamaz Kostava (born 1956), Georgian Soviet footballer
- Tamaz Mchedlidze (born 1993), Georgian rugby union player
- Tamaz Mechiauri (1954–2022), Georgian politician, engineer and economist
- Tamaz Meliava (1929–1972), Georgian Soviet film director and screenwriter
- Tamaz Namgalauri (1957–1991), Georgian judoka
- Tamaz Nadareishvili (1954–2004), Georgian politician, head of the Council of Ministers of Abkhazia
- Tamaz Pertia (born 1974), Georgian football player and manager
- Tamaz Stepania (1950–1972), Georgian footballer
- Tamaz Topuriya (born 2002), Russian footballer
- Tamaz Vashakidze (born 1961), Georgian ballet artist, premier dancer of the State Georgian Ballet, choreographer

== See also ==
- Tamaz Stephania Stadium, multi-use stadium in Bolnisi, Georgia
- Tahmasp (disambiguation)
- Tamaas
- Tamasa
- Tamazh
- Tameza
- Tamiza
- Tammuz (disambiguation)
- Tammouz (disambiguation)
- Thomaz (disambiguation)
- Tomasz (disambiguation)
