= Abakelia =

Abakelia, (Georgian: აბაკელია) is a Georgian surname. Notable people with the surname include:

- Ioseb Abakelia (1882–1938), Georgian physician and medical scholar
- Tamar Abakelia (1905–1953), Georgian sculptor, theater designer, and illustrator
