= Gori State Teaching University =

Public university in Gori, Georgia

- გორის სასწავლო სახელმწიფო უნივერსიტეტი
- GSTU main building
- Other name: გუ (Gu)
- Motto: Knowledge for Life
- Type: Public
- Established: July 16, 1999; 27 years ago
- Budget: ₾4.9 million
- Rector: Giorgi Sosiashvili
- Location: 57, Ilia Chavchavadze Ave., Gori, Shida Kartli, Georgia; 41°58′56.6″N 44°06′49″E
- Campus: Urban
- Language: Georgian
- Website: www.gu.edu.ge/ge

Gori State Teaching University is a center for education and science in Shida Kartli in the Gori Municipality of Georgia, it was established as a result of merging of two high education institutions: Gori State University and Tskhinvali State University.

== History ==
The Transcaucasian Teachers Seminary opened in Gori on 12 September 1876, and trained many well-known teachers and public figures of Georgia, including Vazha-Pshavela, Mikheil Tsinamdzgvrishvili, Ia Kargareteli, and others more.

In August 1935, the university was opened as a two-year teaching institute, which in 1939 was reestablished as the Gori State Pedagogical Institute with four-year studies. The institute was named after the Georgian poet Nikoloz Baratashvili. In 1985, as a result of reorganization of the Gori N. Baratashvili State Pedagogical Institute, the Gori State Economic Institute, renamed in 1997 as Gori State Economic-Humanitarian Institute, was established. On 16 July 1999 the mentioned institution received university status.

The Tskhinvali State Pedagogic Institute was established in 1932 with one faculty: agro-biologic. In the following years, new faculties were added. Gradually it grew into an educational, scientific and cultural center. Since its foundation, the institute has had support from Georgian scientists.

After the Georgian-Ossetian conflict, 1991, Tskhinvali State Pedagogic Institute continued functioning in Gori city. Despite poor logistics the institute personnel kept the appropriate level of teaching process. On 16 June 2000 Tskhinvali State Pedagogical Institute received university status.

The above-mentioned institutions have over the years employed such distinguished scientists and public figures as George Akhvlediani, E. Metreveli, Arnold Chikobava, T. Uturgaidze, G. Zhordania, Zurab Sarjveladze, S. Gachechiladze, S. Khutsishvili, V. Topuria, Sergi Makalatia, G. Merkviladze, David Tevzadze, etc.

== Current university ==
The main objective of the newly founded institution LEoPL-Gori University is to provide a quality education appropriate to modern requirements. The academic personnel consists of 106 professors, the university has 7 buildings, library and sports ground, computer labs and centers, etc.

From 2011 Acting Rector of the Gori State Teaching University is a professor Giorgi Sosiashvili.

The university building was damaged in a Russian air strike during the 2008 Russo-Georgian war.

=== Notable people ===
- Manana Chitishvili (born 1954), poet
- Vladimer Khinchegashvili (born 1991), 2016 Olympic Gold medalist freestyle wrestler
- Geno Petriashvili (born 1994), 2024 Olympic Gold medalist freestyle wrestler
