= Burduli =

Burduli (Georgian: ბურდული) is a Georgian surname that may refer to the following notable people:

- Elguja Burduli (1941–2022), Soviet and Georgian film actor
- Mirian Burduli (born 1991), Georgian rugby union player
- Vladimir Burduli (born 1980), Georgian football manager and former player
