= Levan (name) =

Levan (Georgian: ლევანი) is a Georgian name, equivalent to English Leo.

Other forms of name Levan used in Georgian are: Levaniko (ლევანიკო) and Levancho (ლევანჩო)

It may refer to:

== Royalty and nobility ==
- Levan of Kakheti, Georgian king of the Kingdom of Kakheti
- Levan of Imereti, Georgian king of the Kingdom of Imereti
- Prince Levan of Kartli, Georgian regent of the Kingdom of Kartli
- Levan I Dadiani, Georgian ruler
- Levan II Dadiani, Georgian ruler
- Levan III Dadiani, Georgian ruler
- Levan IV Dadiani, Georgian ruler
- Levan V Dadiani, Georgian ruler
- Levan Gruzinsky, Georgian royal prince
- Prince Levan of Georgia (1756–1781), Georgian royal prince
- Prince Levan of Georgia (1786–1812), Georgian royal prince
- Levan, Prince of Mukhrani, Georgian nobleman
- Levan Abashidze, Georgian nobleman

== People ==
- Levan Saginashvili, Georgian armwrestler
- Levan Songulashvili, Georgian artist
- Levan Ghvaberidze, Georgian rugby union player
- Levan Silagadze, Georgian footballer
- Levan Akhvlediani, Georgian sports official
- Levan Gorgadze, Georgian sumo wrestler
- Levan Razmadze, Georgian judoka
- Levan Sharashenidze, Georgian officer
- Levan Razikashvili, Georgian policeman
- Levan Abashidze, Georgian actor
- Levan Agniashvili, Georgian lawyer
- Levan Lagidze, Georgian painter
- Levan Gvazava, Georgian footballer
- Levan Sanadze, Georgian athlete
- Levan Zhorzholiani, Georgian judoka
- Levan Chilachava, Georgian rugby union player
- Levan Tskitishvili, Georgian footballer
- Levan Mchedlidze, Georgian footballer
- Levan Berianidze, Georgian wrestler
- Levan Korgalidze, Georgian footballer
- Levan Datunashvili, Georgian rugby union player
- Levan Khomeriki, Georgian footballer
- Levan Gabriadze, Georgian actor and director
- Levan Kenia, Georgian footballer
- Levan Kobiashvili, Georgian footballer
- Levan Gureshidze, Georgian luger
- Levan Moseshvili, Georgian basketball player
- Levan Melkadze, Georgian footballer
- Levan Khmaladze, Georgian footballer
- Levan Tediashvili, Georgian wrestler
- Levan Gachechiladze, Georgian politician
- Levan Kebadze, Georgian footballer
- Levan Maghradze, Georgian footballer
- Levan Nikoleishvili, Georgian colonel
- Levan Aroshidze, Georgian chess grandmaster
- Levan Chilashvili, Georgian archaeologist
- Levan Dzharkava, Georgian footballer
- Levan Kakubava, Georgian footballer
- Levan Mikadze, Georgian footballer
- Levan Gotua, Georgian writer
- Levan Choladze, Georgian politician
- Levan Varshalomidze, Georgian politician
- Levan Latsuzbaya, Georgian footballer
- Levan Aleksidze, Georgian jurist
