= Somkhishvili =

Somkhishvili is a Georgian surname meaning "son of Somkhi", i.e., of Armenian. Notable people with the surname include:

- Sophio Somkhishvili
- Tamaz Somkhishvili
