= Amashukeli =

Amashukeli (Georgian: ამაშუკელი) is a Georgian surname which may refer to:

- Vasil Amashukeli (1886–1977), Georgian film director
- Elguja Amashukeli (1928–2002), Georgian sculptor
- Besik Amashukeli (born 1972), Georgian footballer
- Marie Amachoukeli (born 1979), French film director of Georgian origin
- Nika Amashukeli (born 1994), Georgian rugby referee
