= Mañana =

Mañana may refer to:

== People ==
- Àngel Mañana (born 1985), Spanish-born Equatoguinean basketball player

== Music ==
- "Mañana (Is Soon Enough for Me)", a 1947 song written by Peggy Lee and Dave Barbour
- "Mañana", a 1972 hit for the Bay City Rollers
- "Mañana, Mañana", a song written by Juan Gabriel
- "Mañana", a song written by Gloria Trevi, from her 1989 album ...¿Qué Hago Aquí?
- "Mañana", a song written by Jimmy Buffett on his Son of a Son of a Sailor album
- "Mañana", a song by German rock band Amon Düül II, on their 1973 album Vive La Trance
- "Manana", a song by the Desaparecidos on their album Read Music/Speak Spanish
- Mañana (album), a 2005 album by Mexican band Sin Bandera
- "Mañana" (Álvaro Soler and Cali y El Dandee song), a 2021 song

== Media ==
- Mañana (newspaper), a Spanish newspaper (1938-39)
- La Mañana, a newspaper of the province of Lleida in Spain
- La Mañana (Uruguay), a Uruguayan newspaper (1914-1990s)

== Other ==
- Mañana attitude, lax attitude to time, tardiness
- Mañana Literary Society, a 20th-century group of science fiction writers

== See also ==
- Manana (disambiguation)
- El Mañana (disambiguation)
