= Glonti =

The Glonti (Georgian: ღლონტი [ɣlontʼi]) is a Georgian family name from the Guria region in western Georgia.

The Glonti family name comes from these towns of Guria: Aketi, Askana, Atsana, Bakhvi, Bokhvauri, Bukistsikhe, Buknari, Gomi, Gurianta, Dvabzu, Vakijvari, Zomleti, Tkhinvali, Konchkati, Laituri, Lanchkhuti, Likhauri, Makvaneti, Mamati, Machkhvareti, Meleqeduri, Meria, Natanebi, Nasakirali, Nagobilevi, Nigvziani, Ninoshvili, Ozurgeti, Silauri, Supsa, Ureki, Pampaleti, Kvenobani, Grmagele, Shemokmedi, Shroma, Shua Partskhma, Shukhuti, Chibati, Chochkhati, Tskhemliskhidi, Tchanieti, Jumati and Jurukhveti.
