= Iakob Gruzinsky =

Prince Iakob Levanis Dze Bagration-Gruzinsky (Georgian: იაკობ ლევანის ძე ბაგრატიონი გრუზინსკი) (1757-1835) was a Georgian royal prince (batonishvili) of Bagrationi dynasty. He was son of Levan Gruzinsky.

Prince Iakob married Princess Vera Petrovna Urusova (1765-1835) and had 8 children:

- Demetre
- Nikoloz (1783-1861)
- Petre (1785-1812)
- Aleksandra (1787-1853)
- Iakob (1793-1866)
- Sergo (1795-1880)
- Vera (1801-1860)
- Aleksandre (1802-1828)
