= Nozadze =

Nozadze (Georgian: ნოზაძე) is a Georgian surname. Common variations include Nazadze, Nozatze, and Nosadze. Notable people with the surname include:

- Lasha Nozadze (born 1980), Georgian football player
- Ramaz Nozadze (born 1983), Georgian wrestler
