= Berdzenishvili =

Berdzenishvili (Georgian: ბერძენიშვილი) is a Georgian surname that may refer to the following notable people:

- Levan Berdzenishvili, Georgian politician, author and academic
- Merab Berdzenishvili (1929–2016), Georgian sculptor and artist
- Nikoloz Berdzenishvili (1895–1965), Georgian historian
- Tinatin Berdzenishvili (born 1979), Georgian journalist and media manager
