= Lashkhi =

Lashkhi (Georgian: ლაშხი) is a Georgian surname. Notable people with the surname include:

- Mariam Lashkhi (born 1988), Georgian politician
- Revaz Lashkhi (born 1988), Georgian Greco-Roman wrestler
