= Tsiklauri =

Tsiklauri (Georgian: წიკლაური) is a Georgian surname. Notable people with the surname include:

- Beka Tsiklauri (born 1989), Georgian rugby union player
- Mariam Tsiklauri (born 1960), Georgian poet, children's author and translator
- Nino Tsiklauri (born 1993), Georgian alpine skier
- Tako Tsiklauri (born 1997), Georgian singer
