= Meskhi =

Meskhi (Georgian: მესხი) is a Georgian surname. Notable people with the surname include:

- Leila Meskhi (born 1968), Georgian tennis player
- Mikheil Meskhi (1937–91), Georgian football player
- Mykhaylo Meskhi (born 1997), Ukrainian football player
