= Kapanadze =

Kapanadze (Georgian: კაპანაძე) is a Georgian surname that may refer to the following notable people:

- Avtandil Kapanadze (born 1962), Georgian football player
- Sergi Kapanadze, Georgian politician and academic
- Tornike Kapanadze (born 1992), Georgian football player
- Vakhtang Kapanadze (born 1960), Georgian major general
- Vazha Kapanadze (born 1995), Georgian rugby union player
