= Arveladze =

Arveladze (Georgian: არველაძე) is a Georgian surname. Notable people with the surname include:

- Archil Arveladze (born 1973), Georgian footballer, identical twin of Shota
- Giorgi Arveladze (born 1978), Ex-Minister for Economics of Georgia (2006–2007)
- Levan Arveladze (born 1993), Georgian footballer
- Revaz Arveladze (born 1969), Georgian footballer, older brother of Shota and Archil
- Shota Arveladze (born 1973), Georgian footballer
- Vato Arveladze (born 1998), Georgian footballer
