= Tugushi =

The Tugushi (Georgian: ტუღუში [tʼuɣuʃi]) is a Georgian family name from the Guria region in western Georgia.

The Tugushi family name comes from these towns of Guria: Aketi, Baileti, Bakhvi, Bokhvauri, Gvimralauri, Gogolesubani, Guturi, Gurianta, Dvabzu, Erketi, Zomleti, Konchkati, Lanchkhuti, Lesa, Makvaneti, Meria, Natanebi, Nigvziani, Ninoshvili, Ozurgeti, Silauri, Supsa, Kvenobani, Shemokmedi, Shroma, Shukhuti, Chaisubani, Chibati, Chochkhati, Chokhatauri, Dzimiti, Khvarbeti, Khidistavi, Jumati and Jurukhveti.

== Notable members ==
- Kote Tugushi, Georgian basketball player
- Temur Tugushi, Soviet footballer
