= Kartvelishvili =

Kartvelishvili is a Georgian surname meaning "son of Kartvel", i.e., of Georgian. Notable people with the surname include:

- Alexander Kartvelishvili
- Giorgi Kartvelishvili
- Lavrenty Kartvelishvili

== See also ==
- Kartveli
