= Manana =

Manana may refer to:

== Places ==
- Mānana or Mānana Island, an islet in Hawaii
- Manana Island (Maine), an island off Maine, United States, adjacent to Monhegan island

== People ==
=== Given name ===
- Manana Anasashvili (born 1952), Georgian film and theatre director, and academic
- Manana Antadze (born 1945), Georgian writer and translator
- Manana Archvadze-Gamsakhurdia, Georgian pediatrician, activist and politician
- Manana Catherine Mabuza, South African politician, acting Premier of Limpopo
- Manana Chitishvili (born 1954), Georgian poet and academic
- Manana Doijashvili, Georgian pianist and professor of piano
- Manana Japaridze, Azerbaijani singer
- Manana Kochladze (born c. 1972), Georgian biologist and environmentalist
- Manana Matiashvili (born 1978), Georgian poet, translator, and academic
- Manana Orbeliani (1808–1870), Georgian princess, noblewoman and socialite
- Manana Shapakidze (born 1989), Georgian tennis player

=== Surname ===
- Bernard Manana (born 1972), Papua New Guinean sprinter
- Mduduzi Manana, South African politician
- Thando Manana (born 1977), South African rugby union player

== Other ==
- Manana (reflection), an essential Hindu ritual
- Manana Take, a goddess in the Rapa Nui mythology

== See also ==
- Manama, the capital of Bahrain
- Mañana (disambiguation)
