= Levan Gruzinsky =

- Levan, son of Bakar
- Born: 6 September 1728
- Died: 23 June 1763 (aged 34)
- Burial: Donskoy Monastery
- Spouse: Princess Aleksandra Yakovlevna Sibirsky (m. 1752)
- Issue: 9, including Iakob Gruzinsky
Names
- Leon Bakarovich Gruzinsky
- Georgian: ლევან ბაქარის ძე
- Russian: Леон Бакарович Грузинский
- House: House of Mukhrani (Bagrationi dynasty)
- Father: Bakar of Kartli
- Occupation: Second major of the Izmaylovsky Regiment in the Imperial Russian Army

Levan, son of Bakar (Georgian: ლევან ბაქარის ძე) or Leon Bakarovich Gruzinsky (Russian: Леон Бакарович Грузинский) (6 September 1728 – 23 June 1763) was a Georgian prince of the Mukhrani branch of the royal Bagrationi dynasty. In Russia he bore the surname of Gruzinsky.

== Career ==
Prince Levan was the son of Bakar of Kartli who had followed his father Vakhtang VI, the king of Kartli, into exile to Russia in 1724. Levan was educated at the Moscow State University and, beyond Georgian and Russian, commanded Latin, French, and German languages. Like many of his family members and relatives, he then pursued a military career. He served in the elite Izmailovsky Life Guards Regiment, attaining to the rank of second major of the Imperial Russian Army. Levan was keenly interested in history and authored one of the first Georgian textbooks in world history, outlining the history of about 50 countries and peoples. Prince Levan died on 23 June 1763. He was buried at the Donskoy Monastery in Moscow.

== Family ==
In 1752 Levan married Princess Aleksandra Yakovlevna Sibirsky (1728–1793), whose grandmother was sister of the Tsarina of Russia Agafya Grushetskaya. After the marriage Prince Levan moved to the village of Brynkovo, a dowry of his wife. Prince Levan lived 13 years in marriage and left a widowed 35-year-old wife. The couple had nine children, of whom, Princess Anna married Alexander Dadiani of the Georgian noble House of Dadiani.

The children of Prince Levan with Princess Aleksandra Sibirsky were:

- Iakob Gruzinsky
- Dimitri Bagration-Gruzinsky
- Leon Bagration-Gruzinsky
- Alexander Bagration-Gruzinsky
- Marta Bagration-Gruzinsky
- Daria Bagration-Gruzinsky
- Maria Bagration-Gruzinsky
- Sofia Bagration-Gruzinsky
- Anastasia Bagration-Gruzinsky

The 19th-century artist Pyotr Gruzinsky was Levan's descendant through his son, Iakob. He was the last direct male descendant of King Vakhtang VI and the last in the Gruzinsky line.
