= Gvazava =

Gvazava (Georgian: გვაზავა) is a Georgian surname. Notable people with the surname include:

- Giorgi Gvazava (1869–1941), Georgian jurist, writer, and politician
- Levan Gvazava (born 1980), Georgian footballer and manager
