= Kvaratskhelia =

Kvaratskhelia (Georgian: კვარაცხელია) is a Georgian surname that may refer to:

- Badri Kvaratskhelia (born 1965), Georgian-Azerbaijani footballer, father of Khvicha
- Givi Kvaratskhelia (born 1979), Georgian footballer
- Juma Kvaratskhelia (born 1969), Georgian footballer
- Khvicha Kvaratskhelia (born 2001), Georgian footballer
