= Nikoloz =

- Gender: Male
- Language: Georgian

Origin
- Region of origin: Georgia

Nikoloz (Georgian: ნიკოლოზ) is a Georgian masculine given name. Diminutives of Nikoloz include Nika and Niko. It is a cognate of the name Nicholas. Notable people with the name include:

- Nikoloz "Tato" Baratashvili (1817–1845), Georgian poet
- Nikoloz Basilashvili (born 1992), Georgian tennis player
- Nikoloz Berdzenishvili (1895–1965), Georgian historian and academician
- Nikoloz "Nika" Chkheidze (born 1968), Georgian footballer
- Nikoloz Cholokashvili (1585–1658), Georgian Orthodox priest, politician and diplomat
- Nikoloz Gelashvili (born 1985), Georgian footballer
- Nikoloz "Nika" Gilauri (born 1975), Georgian politician, former Prime Minister of Georgia
- Nikoloz Gruzinsky (1783–1861), Georgian prince
- Nikoloz Izoria (born 1985), Georgian boxer
- Nikoloz "Lasha" Janashia (1931–1982), Georgian historian and academician
- Nikoloz "Nika" Janjgava (born 1970), Georgian military colonel and a military historian
- Nikoloz "Nika" Kvekveskiri (born 29 May 1992), Georgian footballer
- Nikoloz "Niko" Lekishvili (born 1947), Georgian politician and statesman, former Prime Minister of Georgia
- Nikoloz Memanishvili (born 1979), Georgian conductor, composer and cultural manager
- Nikoloz Mnatobishvili (born 1992), Georgian footballer
- Nikoloz "Niko" Muskhelishvili (1891–1976), Georgian-Soviet mathematician, physician and engineer
- Nikoloz "Niko" Rurua (1968–2018), Georgian politician
- Nikoloz Shengelaia (1903–1943), Georgian film director
- Nikoloz Togonidze (born 1971), Georgian footballer
- Nikoloz Tskitishvili (born 1983), Georgian basketball player
- Nikoloz "Nika" Vacheishvili (born 1968) Georgian art scholar and politician
