= Bolkvadze =

Bolkvadze (Georgian: ბოლქვაძე) is a Georgian surname. Notable people with the surname include:

- Davit Bolkvadze (born 1980), Georgian footballer
- Elisso Bolkvadze (born 1967), Georgian classical pianist
- Irakli Bolkvadze (born 1994), Georgian swimmer
- Mariam Bolkvadze (born 1998), Georgian tennis player
- Rusudan Bolkvadze (born 1959), Georgian actress
