= Megrelishvili =

Megrelishvili (Georgian: მეგრელიშვილი) is a Georgian surname meaning "son of Megrel". Notable people with the surname include:

- Haim Megrelishvili (born 1982), retired Israeli football defender
- Jemal Megrelishvili (born 1950), Soviet wrestler
- Vakhtang Megrelishvili

== See also ==
- Megrelashvili
