= IMELI Building =

Historic building in Tbilisi, Georgia presently housing The Biltmore Hotel Tbilisi

IMEL Building
- იმელი
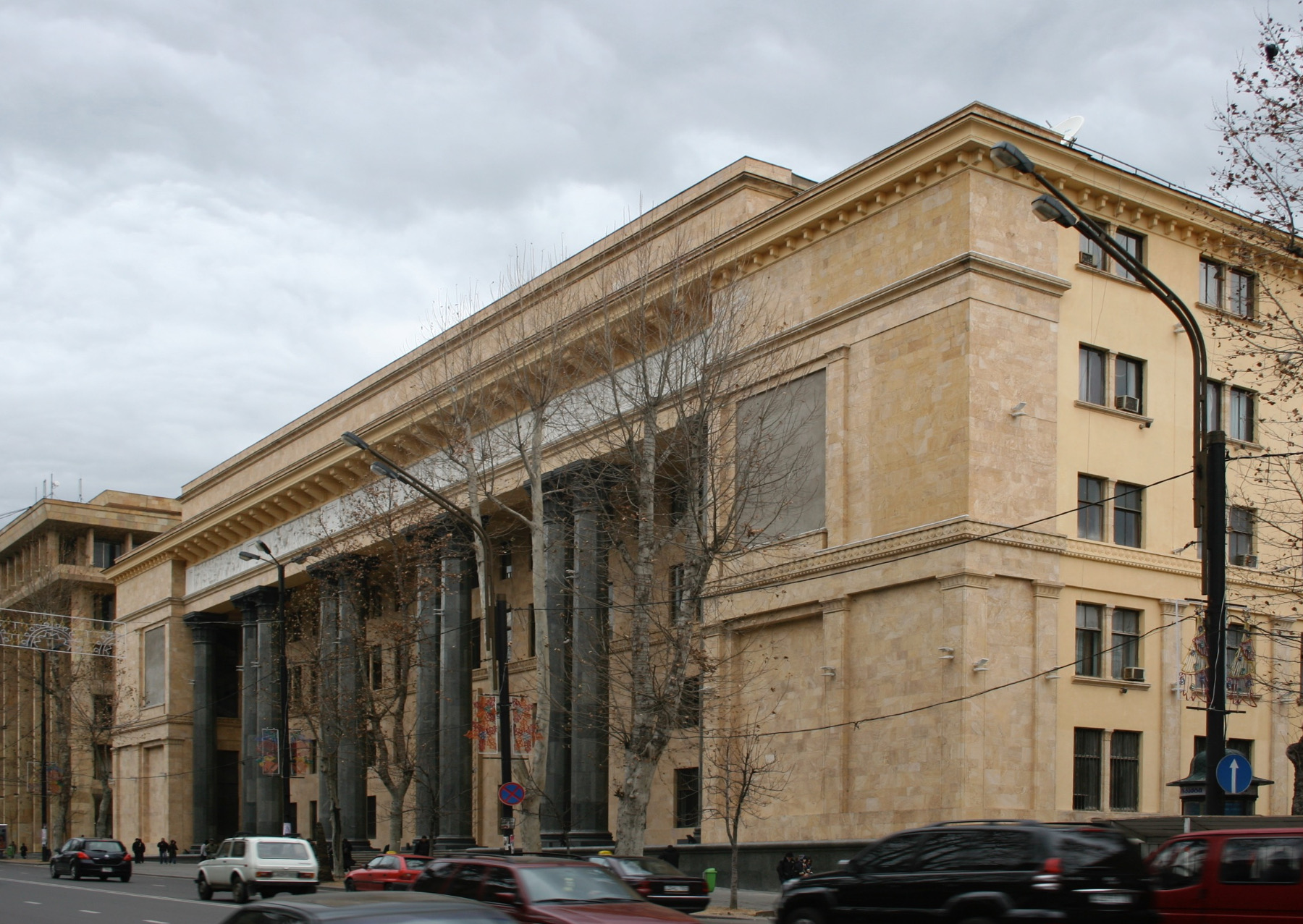
- Interactive map of the IMEL Building area

General information
- Architectural style: Stalinism, constructivism
- Location: 29 Shota Rustaveli Avenue Tbilisi, Georgia
- Coordinates: 41.7022°N 44.7944°E
- Current tenants: The Biltmore Hotel Tbilisi
- Construction started: 1934
- Completed: 1938
- Renovated: 2012-2016

Design and construction
- Architect: Alexey Shchusev

The IMEL Building (Georgian: იმელი) is a historic building in Tbilisi, the capital of Georgia, presently occupied by The Biltmore Hotel Tbilisi (Georgian: სასტუმრო „ბილტმორ თბილისი“). The building was constructed in the 1930s and is located on Rustaveli Avenue, the city's main thoroughfare.

== History ==
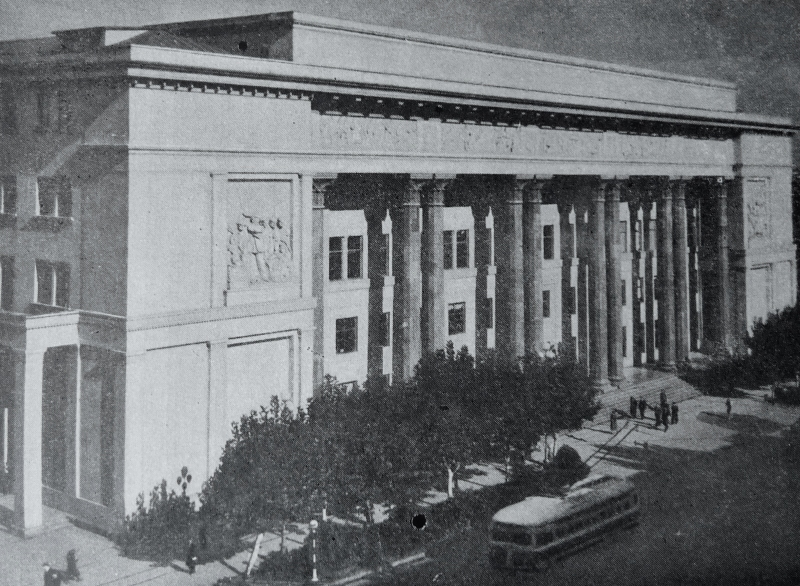
IMELI building in 1938

The IMEL or IMELS building, an example of the Stalin-era Socialist Classicism, was constructed in Tbilisi, the capital of then-Soviet Georgia, between 1934 and 1938 based on the design by Alexey Shchusev to house a Tbilisi-branch of the Marx-Engels-Lenin Institute, briefly also called the Marx-Engels-Lenin-Stalin Institute. IMELI (იმელი) is a Georgian rendition of the institute's Russian name acronymed as IMEL (Russian: ИМЭЛ), which remained colloquial in Tbilisi even after the dissolution of the Soviet Union. Shchusev's design was eclectic, featuring elements of both Socialist Classicism and Constructivism. Both the exterior and interior are richly decorated with wooden and metal works, as well as with various Georgian marbles and natural stones. The facades were adorned by the leading Georgian sculptors of that time—Iakob Nikoladze and Tamar Abakelia. In 1986 the building was listed as architectural heritage.

After the fall of the Soviet Union in 1991, the building was used for government purposes and some Communist-era symbols and decorations were removed from the facades. It housed the Parliament of Georgia from 1992 to 1995. It was where the Georgia's first post-Soviet constitution was adopted on 25 August 1995. Later, it served as the Constitutional Court of Georgia and the Central Election Commission office.

In 2007, after briefly considering reconstruction of the IMEL building to house the Ministry of Foreign Affairs, it was delisted by the government of Georgia and sold to the Capital Vostok company with the intention to build a luxury five-star Kempinski hotel. The suggested architectural development was designed by Berlin-based architects Christoph Kohl and Rob Krier. In the process of renovation, the investor started to demolish the building without due permission, and IMEL lost a number of its original elements, leading to a series of protests from preservationists.

== The Biltmore Hotel Tbilisi ==
By 2008, the project had staggered, and the building was sold to the Abu Dhabi United Group, which agreed to stop demolition and preserve the historical façade of the building. In 2011, Tbilisi City Hall gave permission to the new investor to construct, next to the Shchusev building, a 36-floor, 138-metre glass skyscraper, which now towers over the largely 19th and early 20th-century architecture of Rustaveli Avenue and is connected to the IMEL building via a glass walkway.

Operated by the Millennium & Copthorne Hotels, The Biltmore Hotel Tbilisi is the first Biltmore outside of the United States and the first hotel in the newly presented upscale luxury Biltmore Collection of the Millennium & Copthorne Hotels. The Grand Opening ceremony took place on July 31, 2016. Remaking of the old building as well as the erection of the new one was heavily criticized by preservationists.

About $140 million was invested in the new hotel, mostly by the United Arab Emirates-based construction company Dhabi Group.
