= Pyotr Nikolayevich Gruzinsky =

Russian painter

Prince Pyotr Nikolayevich Gruzinsky
- Пётр Николаевич Грузинский
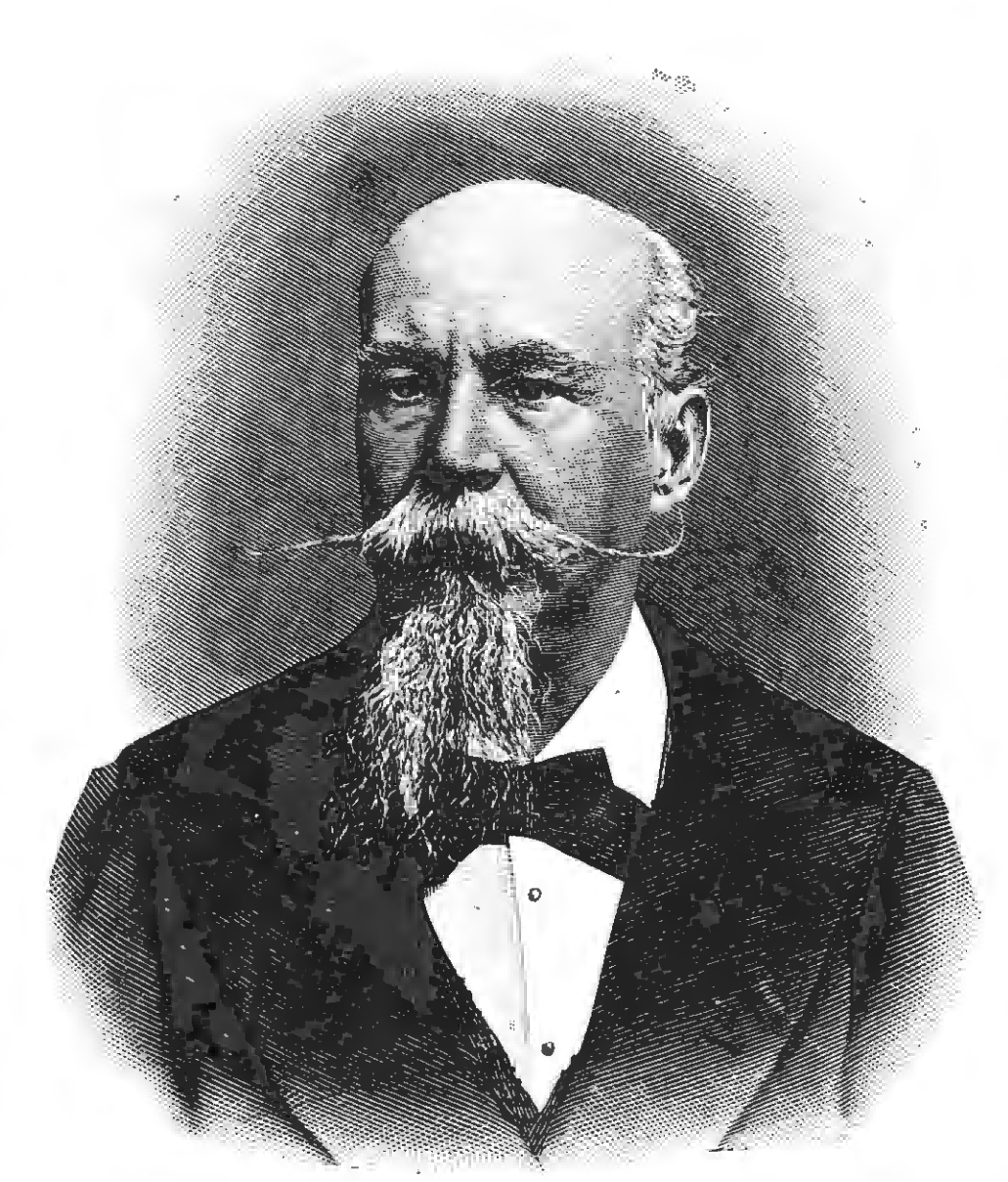
- Engraving from a photograph (1891)
- Born: December 31, 1837; Kursk
- Died: June 1, 1892 (aged 54)
- Education: Imperial Academy of Arts (1862)
- Known for: Painting
- Awards: Big Gold Medal of the Imperial Academy of Arts (1862)
- Elected: Member Academy of Arts (1872)

External image
- Matvey Chizhov, Prince Pyotr Gruzinsky, 1876, plaster bust; Museum of the Academy of Arts, St. Petersburg

Prince Petre Nikolozis Dze Gruzinsky (31 December [O.S. 19 December] 1837 — 1 June [O.S. 20 May] 1892), russified as Pyotr Nikolayevich Gruzinsky, was a Russian painter of royal Georgian origin, primarily known for his military and genre pictures

He was the son of Prince Nikoloz Gruzinsky and a scion of Mukhrani royal line of the Bagrationi dynasty that had moved to Imperial Russia in the 18th century. Pyotr Nikolayevich Gruzinsky was the last direct male descendant of King Vakhtang VI and the last in the Mukhrani royal line.

== Paintings ==
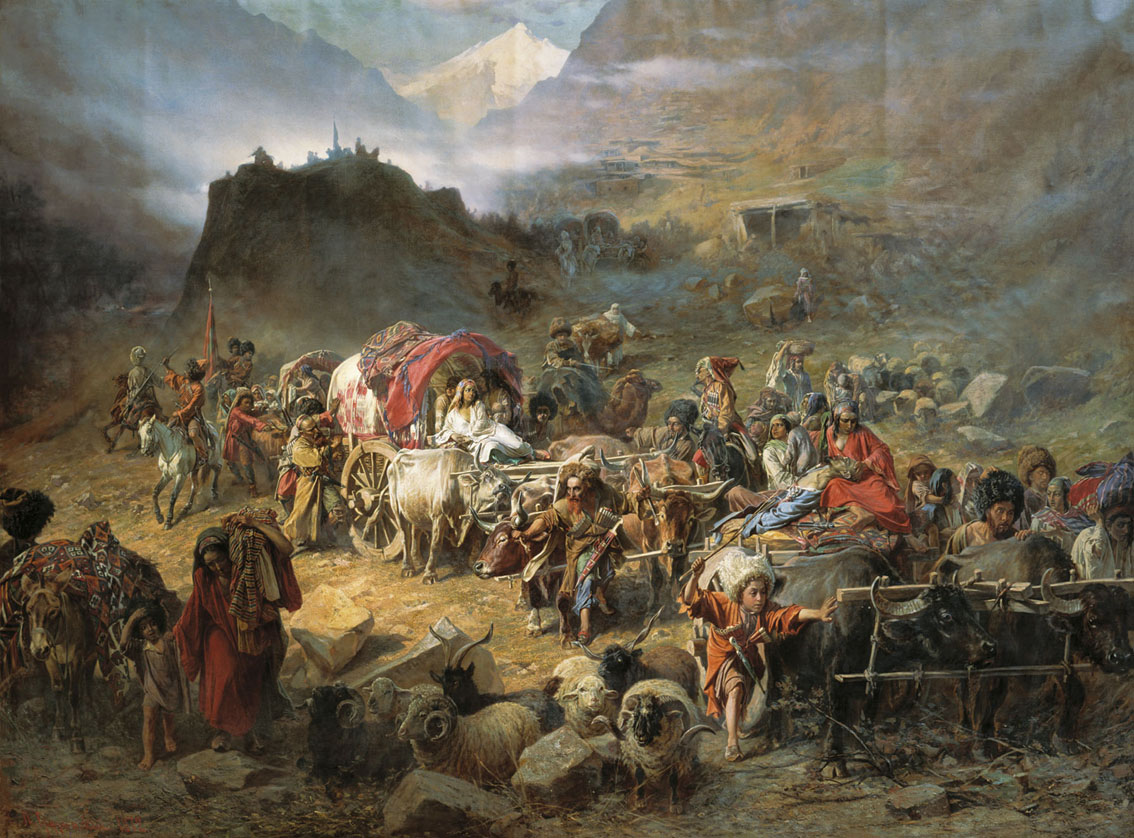
The Mountaineers Leave the Aul, 1872

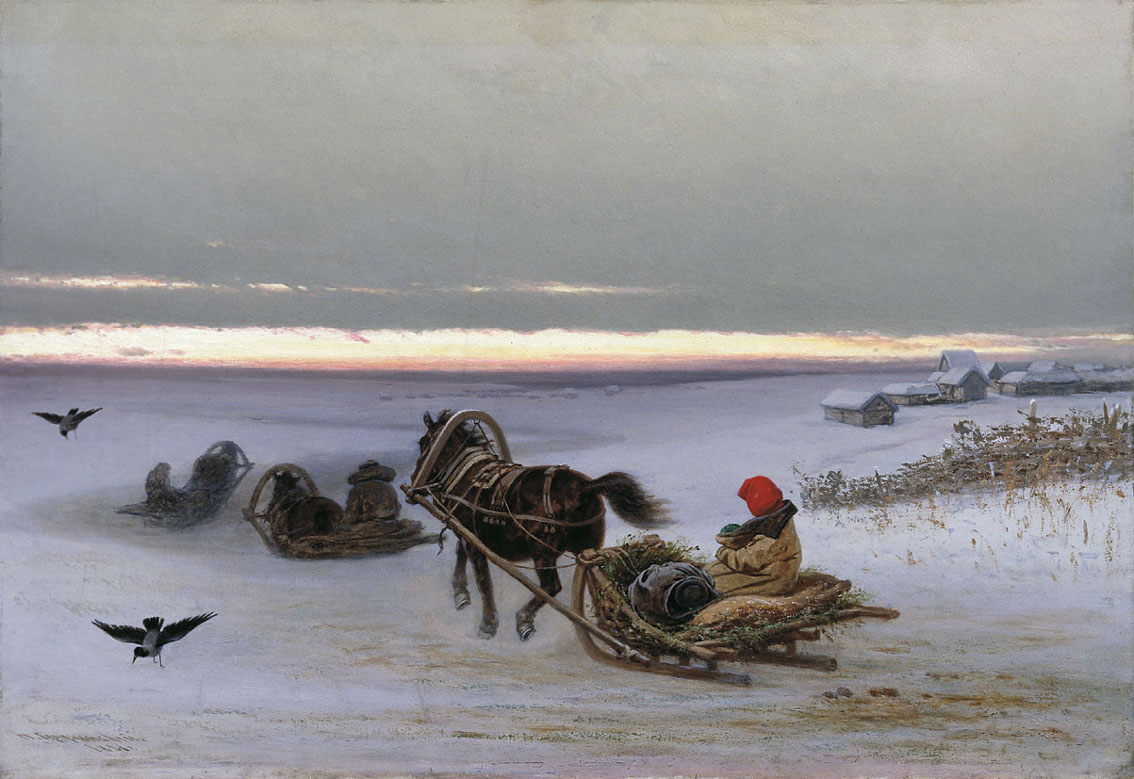
Home

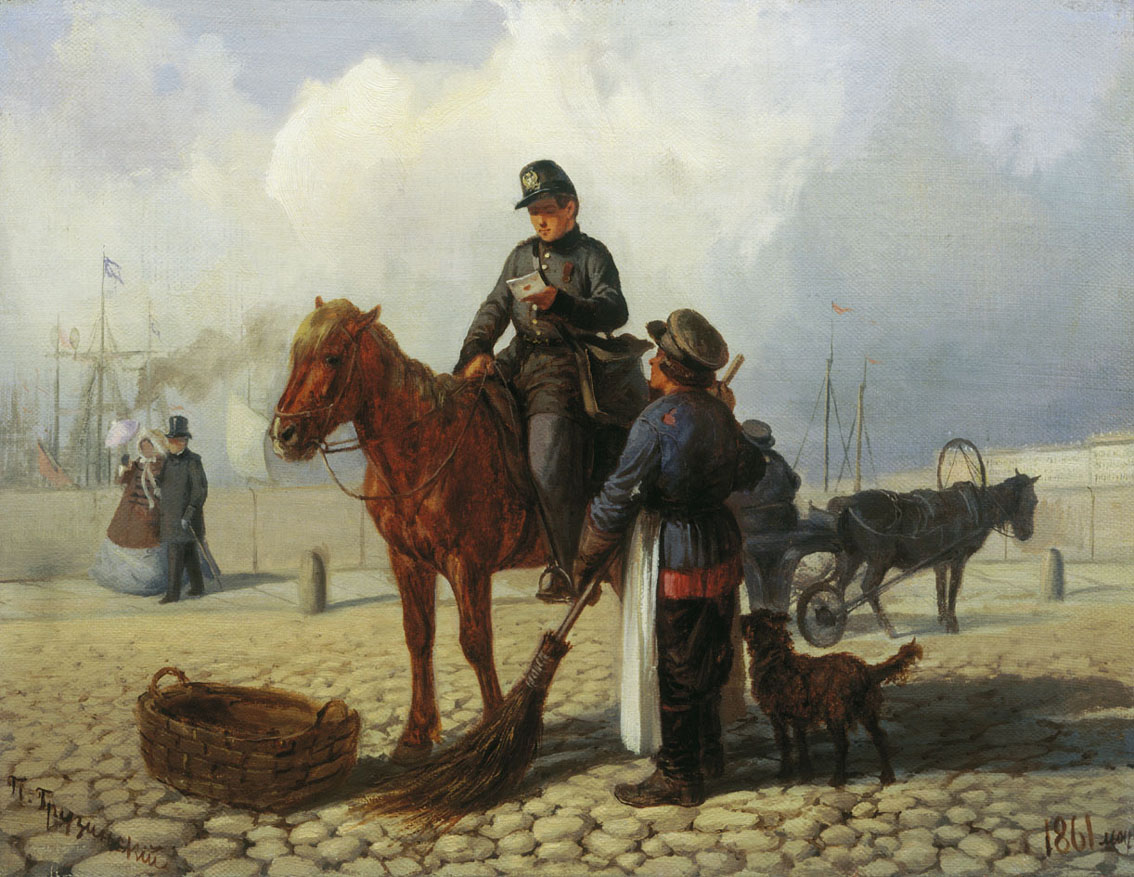
Мail Carrier

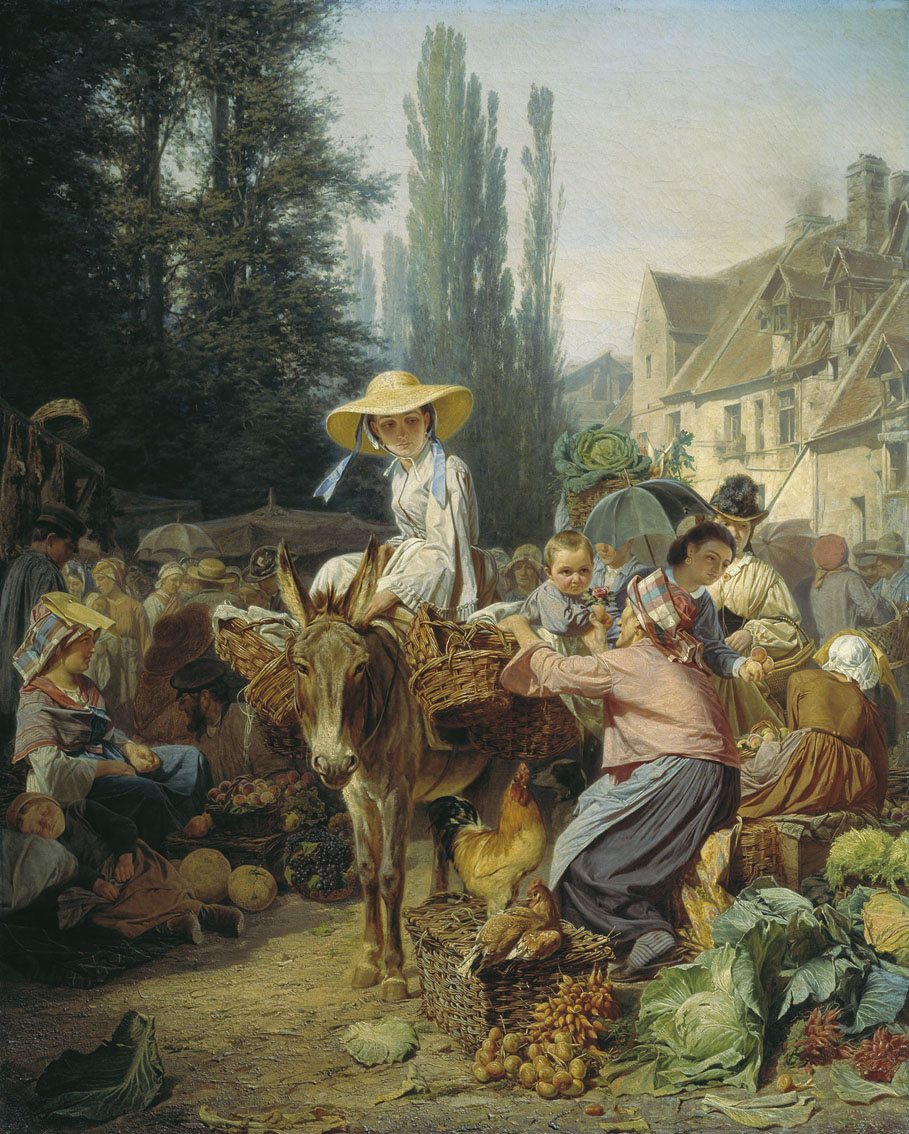
Market in Fontainebleau

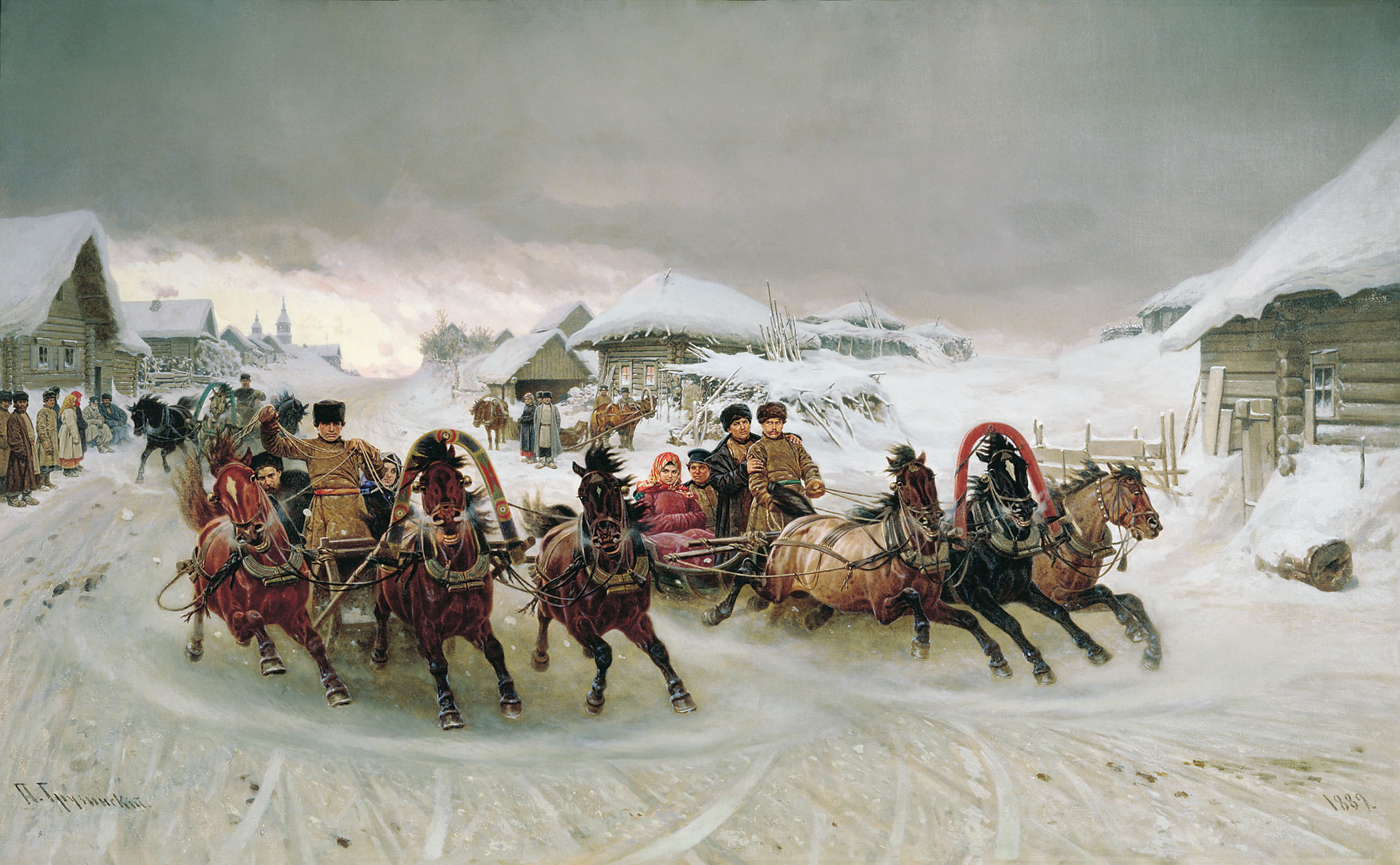
Maslenitsa

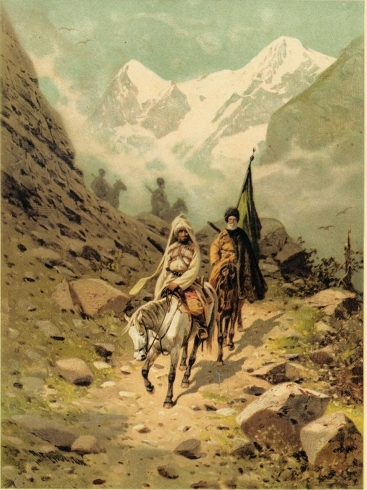
Circassians in the mountains

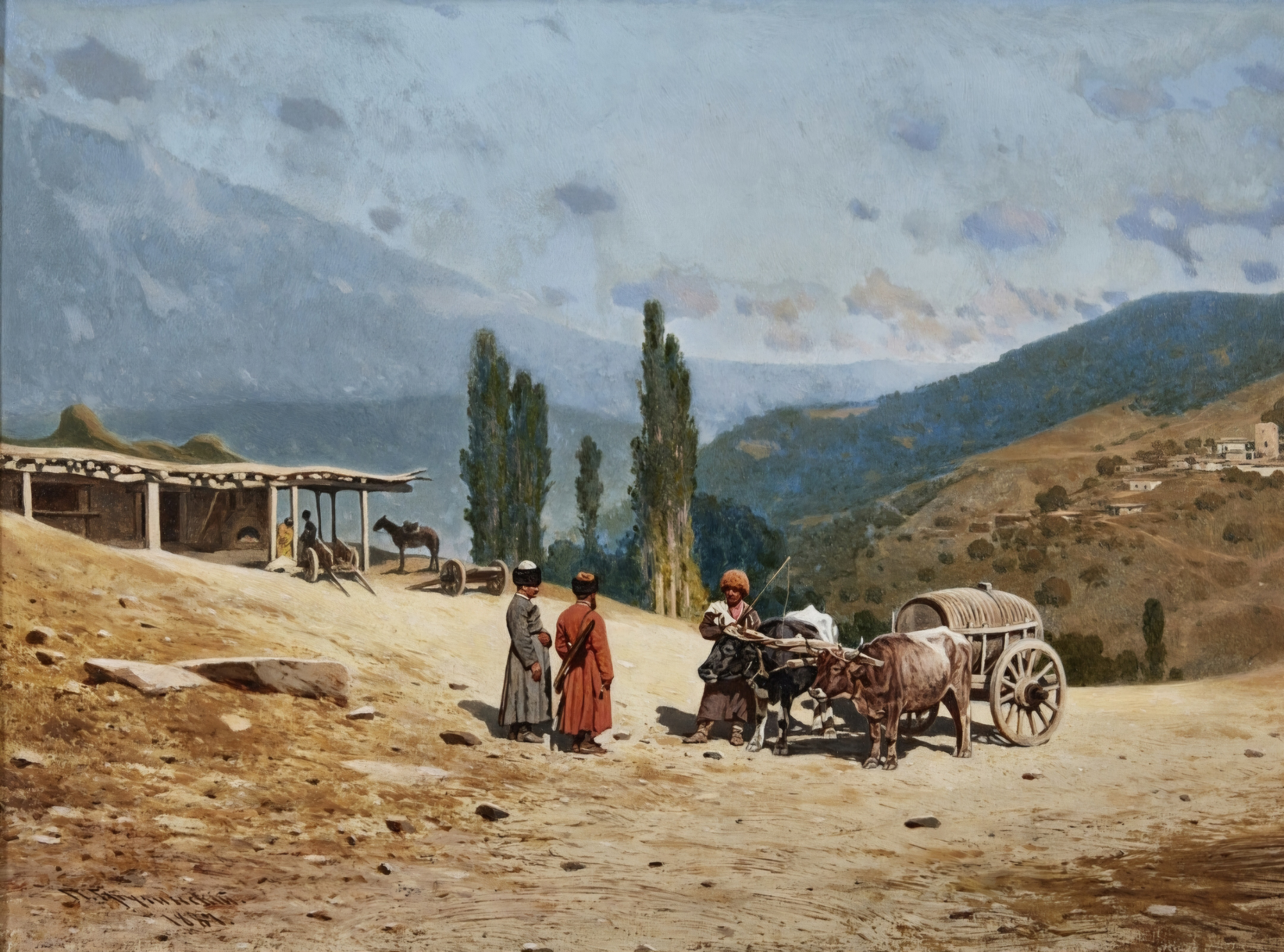
Mountain landscape with men and a chumak
