= El Mañana =

El Mañana, Spanish for "The Tomorrow", may refer to:

- El Mañana (Nuevo Laredo), newspaper in Mexico
- El Mañana (Reynosa), newspaper in Mexico
- "El Mañana" (song), by Gorillaz
