= Avtandil Gvianidze =

Georgian footballer

Personal information
- Full name: Avtandil Gvianidze
- Date of birth: 23 August 1974 (age 52)
- Place of birth: Georgian SSR, Soviet Union
- Height: 1.74 m (5 ft 9 in)
- Position: Defender

Senior career*
Years	Team	Apps	(Gls)
–	Shukura Kobuleti		
–	FC Guria Lanchkhuti		
1998–2002	FC Nyva Ternopil	66	(3)
1998	→ Krystal Chortkiv (loan)	1	(0)
2001	→ FC Ternopil (loan)	2	(0)
2002	FC Dinamo Batumi		
2002–2004	Botev Plovdiv	16	(1)
2004–2005	FC Dinamo Batumi		
- * Club domestic league appearances and goals

Avtandil Gvianidze (born 23 August 1974) is a retired Georgian professional football forward, who played for several clubs in Europe.

== Club career ==
Gvianidze played in Ukraine for FC Nyva Ternopil before returning to FC Dinamo Batumi in January 2002.

Gvianidze played for PFC Botev Plovdiv during the 2002–03 and 2003–04 seasons.
