= Tammouz =

Tammouz may refer to:

- Tammuz (deity), Babylonian and Sumerian god
- Tammuz reactor, an Iraqi nuclear power plant
- Tamouz (band), an Israeli band
