= Vazha Kapanadze =

- Born: January 15, 1995 (age 31) Kutaisi, Georgia
- Height: 1.85 m (6 ft 1 in)
- Weight: 110 kg (17 st 5 lb)

Rugby union career
- Position: Prop
Senior career
Years	Team	Apps	(Points)
2015-2018	Chambery	31	(0)
2018-	Grenoble	0	(0)

Vazha Kapanadze is a Georgian rugby union player. He plays as prop for Grenoble in Top 14.
