= Tamar Abakelia =

Georgian sculptor, theater designer and illustrator

- Born: 19 August 1905; Khoni, Kutais Governorate, Russian Empire
- Died: 14 May 1953 (aged 47); Tbilisi, Georgian SSR, Soviet Union
- Education: Tbilisi State Academy of Arts
- Known for: Sculpture, theater design, illustration
- Awards: Honored Worker of Art of the Georgian SSR (1942); Order of the Red Banner of Labour (24 February 1946)
- Patrons: Nikolai Tikhonov, Shota Rustaveli, Vazha-Pshavela

Tamar Abakelia (also spelled as Tamara Abakeliya; Georgian: თამარ აბაკელია; Russian: Тама́ра Абаке́лия; 19 August 1905 – 14 May 1953) was a Georgian sculptor, theater designer and illustrator. She was granted the title of Honored Artist of the Georgian SSR in 1942.

== Family ==
Abakelia's father, Grigol Abakelia, a chief prosecuting officer for the Georgian SSR, and uncle, Ioseb Abakelia, a leading Georgian tuberculosis specialist, were shot during Joseph Stalin's Great Purge in 1938. She was married to a Socialist poet and playwright Karlo Kaladze (1907–1988). She had one son with Kaladze, sculptor Gulda Kaladze.

== Biography ==
Born in Khoni, Imereti (then part of Kutais Governorate, Russian Empire), Tamar Abakelia graduated from Tbilisi State Academy of Arts in 1929 and taught there beginning in 1938. Among Abakelia's works were graphic illustrations for Nikolay Tikhonov, Shota Rustaveli, David of Sasun, Vazha-Pshavela as well as stage decorations for the Rustaveli and Marjanishvili theaters and costume designs for the films Arsena (1937), Giorgi Saakadze (1942), and David Guramishvili (1945). Many of her achievements were in the field of sculpture. Noted for the dynamism of composition and artistically rounded forms, Abakelia was responsible for much of the progress of Soviet Georgian sculpture. She sculptured friezes on the Museum of Marxism–Leninism in Tbilisi, depicting the various phases of socialist construction in Georgia (1936–37). Abakelia died in Tbilisi in 1953 and was buried there, at the Didube Pantheon.

== Gallery ==
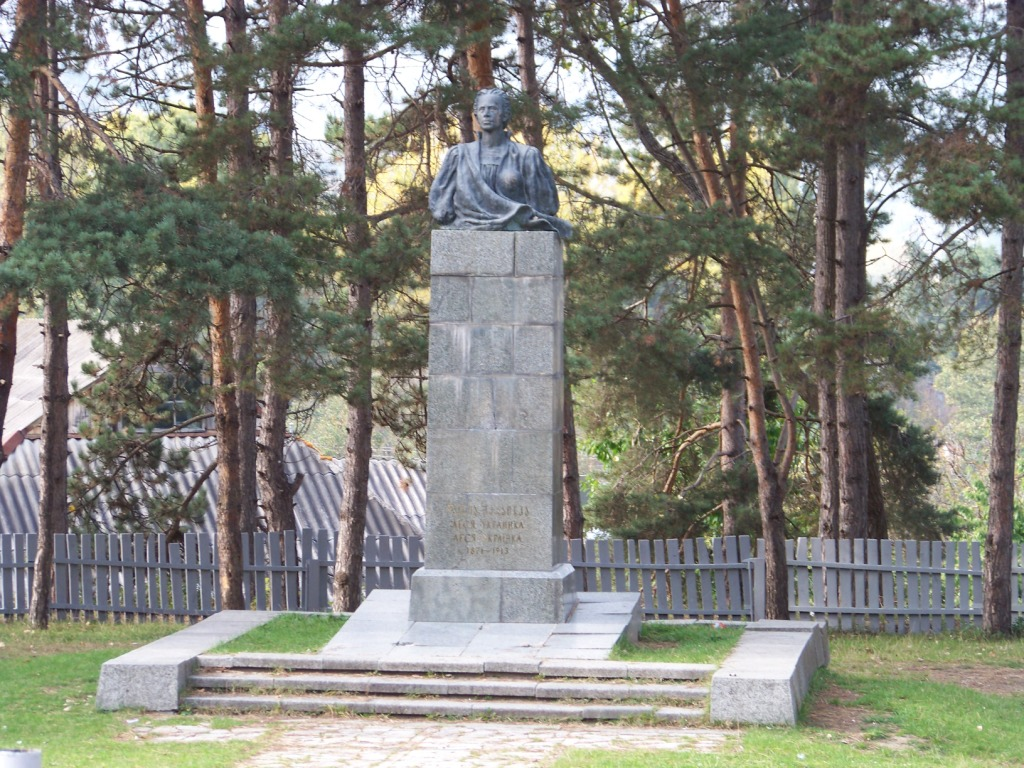
Lesya Ukrainka, 1952
