= Lomidze =

Lomidze (Georgian: ლომიძე) is a Georgian surname. Notable people with the surname include:

- Lasha Lomidze (rugby union, born 1992), Georgian rugby player
- Lasha Lomidze (rugby union, born 2000), Georgian rugby union player
- Mamuka Lomidze (born 1984), Georgian footballer
- Shalva Lomidze (born 1977), Georgian general of intelligence
- Shota Lomidze (1936–1993), Georgian wrestler
- Viktor Lomidze (1900–1956), Georgian-Polish military officer
