= LEVAN =

- Website type: search engine
- Headquarters: Seattle, WA, United States
- Creators: Allen Institute for Artificial Intelligence and University of Washington
- Website: levan.cs.uw.edu
- Commercial: No
- Registration: None
- Launched: March, 2014
- Current status: Active

The LEVAN (Learning EVerything About ANything) is a visual processing search engine developed by computer scientists from Allen Institute for Artificial Intelligence in Seattle and the University of Washington. It is capable of teaching itself about any visual concept without any human supervision during the operation. LEVAN learns which terms are relevant by analyzing the content of the images found on the Web and identifying characteristic patterns across them using recognition algorithms. The funds for the research on LEVAN was provided by the U.S. Office of Naval Research and the National Science Foundation. It was initially rolled out in March and as of 21 June 2014, users can browse a library of about 175 concepts with it.

== Operation ==
LEVAN works by associating the textual data with visual data. After providing it with a textual entry, the programme then searches through numerous books and images and identifies every possible variations of the concept and displays the results as a detailed list of images that have uniformity in appearance. The research team proposed two main approaches, called axes. The "everything" axis corresponds to every possible appearance variations of a concept, while the "anything" axis corresponds to the span of different concepts for which visual models are to be learned. A different algorithm is responsible for refining words that do not correspond to the visual data.

As of June 2014, the system has been working as an archive.

== Future plans ==
In future, the developers of the program intend to release it as an open source program, and eventually offer a smartphone app, to be available for educational purposes and facilitate an information bank to assist researchers in the computer vision community. The phone app will be aimed at quick categorising and tagging of images for archiving.

The researchers will present the project in late June 2014 at the Computer Vision and Pattern Recognition annual conference in Columbus, Ohio.
