= Besik Amashukeli =

Georgian footballer

Personal information
- Date of birth: 1 June 1972 (age 54)
- Height: 1.72 m (5 ft 7 1/2 in)
- Position: Midfielder

Senior career*
Years	Team	Apps	(Gls)
1989	Shevardeni Tbilisi	31	(2)
1990	Pizkulturis Instituti Tbilisi	19	(4)
1990–1992	FC Mertskhali Ozurgeti	52	(9)
1992–1993	FC Mretebi Tbilisi	22	(2)
1993–1996	FC Samtredia	69	(14)
1996	FC Lada Togliatti	9	(0)
1997	FC Kolkheti-1913 Poti	16	(0)
1998	FC Iberia Samtredia	23	(6)
1999	FC Kolkheti-1913 Poti	10	(0)
1999	PFC Spartak Nalchik	5	(0)
2000	FC Lokomotivi Tbilisi	7	(0)
2000	FC Tbilisi	9	(0)
2000–2002	FC Metalurgi Zestaponi	32	(1)
- * Club domestic league appearances and goals

Besik Amashukeli (Georgian: ამაშუკელი ბესიკ; born 1 June 1972) is a retired Georgian professional football player.
