= Gelashvili =

Gelashvili is a surname. Notable people with the surname include:

- Georgi Gelashvili (born 1983), Russian ice hockey goalie
- Iva Gelashvili, (born 2001) Georgian footballer
- Jaba Gelashvili (born 1993), alpine skier from Georgia
- Naira Gelashvili (born 1947), Georgian fiction writer, philologist, Germanist, and civil society activist
- Nikoloz Gelashvili (born 1985), Georgian footballer
- Tamaz Gelashvili (born 1978), chess grandmaster from Georgia
- Valery Gelashvili (born 1960), Georgian politician and businessman
