= Badri Akhvlediani =

Georgian footballer

Personal information
- Date of birth: 30 January 1972 (age 54)
- Height: 1.74 m (5 ft 8 1/2 in)
- Position: Defender

Senior career*
Years	Team	Apps	(Gls)
1990–1992	Amirani Ochamchire	83	(0)
1992–1993	FC Mertskhali Ozurgeti	17	(0)
1993–1998	FC Odishi Zugdidi	119	(8)
1998	FC Kolkheti-1913 Poti	13	(0)
1999–2001	FC Torpedo Kutaisi	54	(4)
2001–2003	FC Kolkheti-1913 Poti	17	(0)

International career
1999	Georgia	2	(0)
- * Club domestic league appearances and goals

Badri Akhvlediani (Georgian: ბადრი ახვლედიანი; born 30 January 1972) is a retired Georgian professional football player.
