= Tina Asatiani =

Armenian physicist (1918–2011)

Tina Asatiani (Georgian: თინათინ ლევანის ასული ასათიანი; Armenian: Թինա Լևանի Ասաթիանի; 12 March 1918 – 20 July 2011) was an Armenian physicist of Georgian origin. Academician of the National Academy of Sciences of the Republic of Armenia (1996), doctor of physical and mathematical sciences (1971), professor (1974). Honored Worker of Science and Technology of the Armenian SSR (1980). Winner of the Lenin Prize (1970). Founder of the Georgian charity community in Armenia, "Iveria."

== Early life and education ==
Tina Asatiani was born on 12 March 1918 in Tbilisi in the family of professor Levan Georgievich Asatiani and Anna Volkova. Asatiani graduated from school with honors. In 1940, she graduated from the Physics Faculty of Tbilisi State University. In 1941, Asatiani entered postgraduate studies at the Leningrad Institute of Physics and Technology (Ioffe Institute of Physics and Technology) in the laboratory of Academician Abram Alikhanov.

== Career ==
During the blockade of Leningrad, Asatiani returned to Tbilisi, where she taught general physics at the Transport Institute. In 1942, when the Alikhanov brothers began organizing a station to study cosmic rays on Mount Aragats, Asatiani was invited there, and in 1943 she began work on a Ph.D. thesis devoted to studying large atmospheric showers. In 1945, Asatiani defended her thesis for a scientific degree as a candidate in physical and mathematical sciences at the Institute of Physical Problems of the Academy of Sciences of the USSR.

In 1943, Asatiani married the physicist Arshaluys Dadayan (later the head of the department at Yerevan State University). Since 1944, she was the head of the μ-meson laboratory at the Physical Institute of the Academy of Sciences of the Armenian SSR (the Yerevan Physical Institute).

Since 1959, Asatiani has participated in the work of many international conferences and delivered reports in many countries worldwide (Japan, India, Canada, USA, England, Germany, France, and Austria).

Since 1968, she has lectured at Yerevan State University on high-energy physics. In 1970, Asatiani and Academician Artem Alikhanyan were awarded the Lenin Prize for their significant contribution to developing spark chamber methods.

In 1971, Asatiani defended her thesis for the Doctor of Physical and Mathematical Sciences degree. In 1974, she was awarded the academic title of professor. In 1991, Asatiani was elected a corresponding member of the Academy of Sciences of the Armenian SSR, and in 1996, she became a full member of the National Academy of Sciences of the Republic of Armenia.

After the Declaration of Independence of Armenia in 1991, Asatiani was engaged in social activities. She was the founder and honorary president of the Georgian charity community in Armenia "Iveria."

Asatiani also dealt with disabled people with spinal cord injuries and their psychological and labor rehabilitation. She wrote and implemented the program Computer and information technology training for people with back pain. According to its program, the British Embassy of Armenia organized a Physical Training Center in Yerevan for people with back pain. Asatiani was a member of the board of the Association of Spine Runners of Armenia "Veratsnund." On her initiative, the College for the Disabled and Orphans was organized in Spitak. In 2008, Asatiani published the book Memories.

Tina Asatiani died in Yerevan on July 20, 2011, at the age of 93. In 2013, a memorial plaque was installed in the house where Asatiani lived from 1950 to 2011 in her memory in Yerevan, Baghramyan Avenue, building 18a).

== Research activities ==
The main scientific works of Tina Asatiani are devoted to high-energy physics and cosmic ray physics, research of elementary particles on the accelerator, and experimental devices of high-energy physics.

In the 1940s, Asatiani studied broad atmospheric showers, applying a new method of determining the primary energy of broad atmospheric showers. Together with academician Artem Alikhanyan, Asatiani discovered and studied the nature of narrow showers caused by nuclear processes, which differ from ordinary particles of broad atmospheric showers.

Assatiani developed an electronic method to reduce the recovery time of the Wilson cloud chamber. She is the author of the device's invention for measuring the coordinates of charged particles — the coordinate detector of charged particles. It is used in experiments on accelerators and the registration of cosmic rays.

Beginning in 1960, Asatiani conducted experimental research on the polarization of cosmic radiation μ-mesons. She carried out research on cylindrical and rectangular hodoscopes and a Wilson chamber. Since 1961, Asatiani has been working on wide-aperture spark chambers and obtained famous results in the study of installing wide-aperture spark chambers in a magnetic field.

Since 1967, Tina Asatiani worked at the experimental facility of the Yerevan Physical Institute "ARUS." Using wide-aperture spark chambers, Asatiani, and her colleagues conducted the first experiment on ARUS, proving that the beam worked. Asatiani performed the first experiment of K०-mesons photo birth on ARUS.

In the early 1970s, a magnetic spectrometer was constructed under the leadership of Asatiani. It enabled measuring the horizontal flux of high-energy cosmic muons with high precision. In the late 1970s, Asatiani investigated the halo phenomenon at the Byurakan Astrophysical Observatory. She also discovered the phenomenon of building multi-halos families.

== Awards and honors ==
- Lenin Prize (1970) — for the work Trekking spark cameras.
- Order of Honor (Georgia).
- Honored Worker of Science and Technology of the Armenian SSR (1980).
- Honorary citizen of Tbilisi (1987).
- Honorary Professor of the Open Society Foundations (1974).
