= Manana Chitishvili =

Georgian poet and academic

- მანანა ჩიტიშვილი
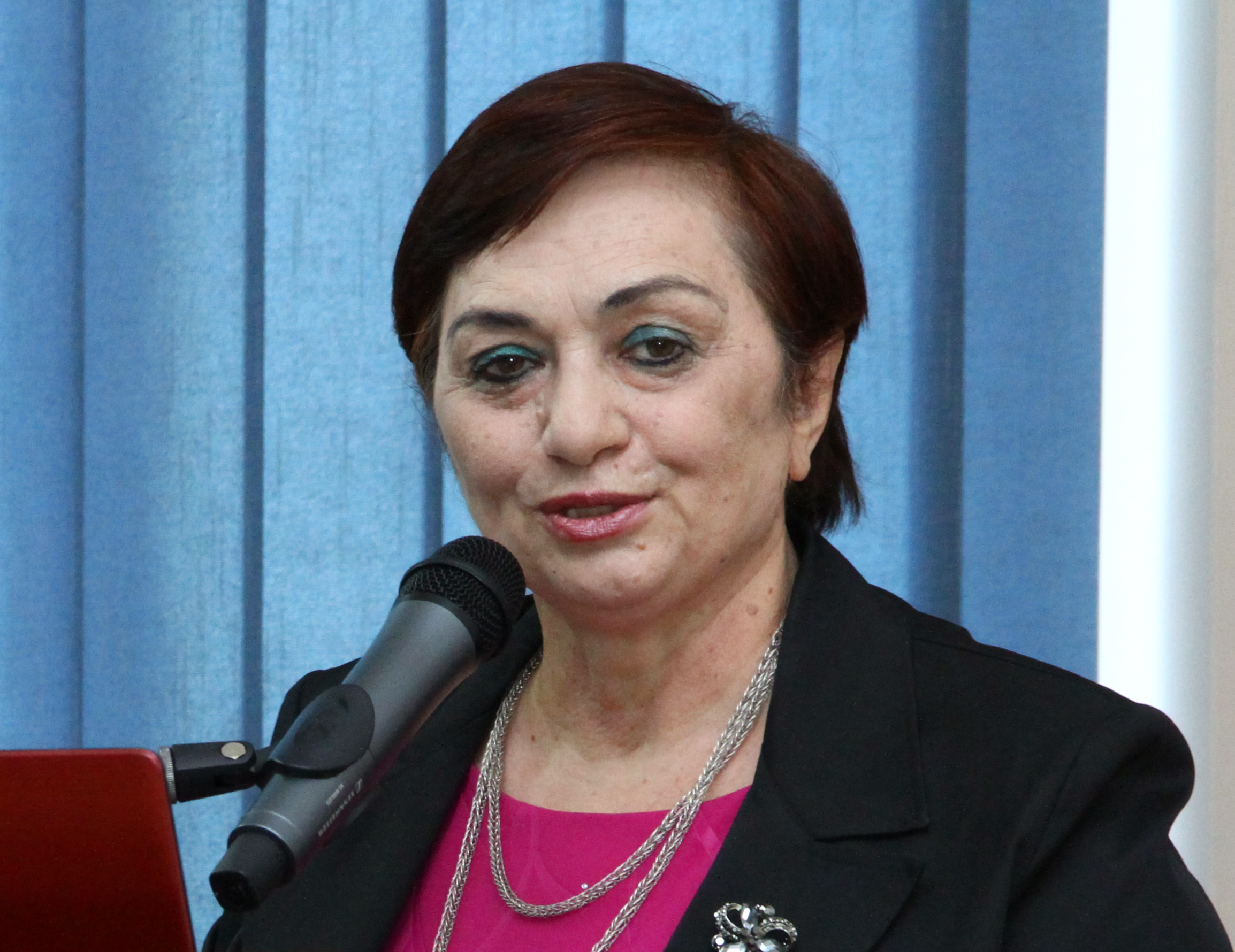
- Born: November 13, 1954 (age 71)
- Education: Gori State Teaching University
- Occupation: Poet
- Writing career
- Language: Georgian

Manana Chitishvili (Georgian: მანანა ჩიტიშვილი; born 13 November 1954) is a Georgian poet and academic, whose works have been translated into five languages.

== Biography ==
Chitishvili was born on 13 November 1954 to an Ossetian family in the village of Korinta, near Akhalgori in South Ossetia. In 1974 she graduated from the Faculty of History and Philology at Gori State Teaching University. After graduation she worked for a regional newspaper as Executive Secretary until 1981; from 1982 to 1985 she was Deputy Editor. In 1986 she defended her PhD dissertation on the life and work of Nikolo Mitsishvili (ka).

=== Poetry ===
Chitishvili began writing poetry at a young age. Her poems have been translated into Italian, English, Armenian, Azerbaijani and Russian. She is known for her simple, poetic style; which continues a long tradition of Georgian tragic poetry. She is known for also introducing new rhythms to traditional poetic styles. Her work has been studied in the context of changed to women's lives during the twentieth century. Her poetry is also known for mimicking the mountain dialect Xevsurian.

=== Awards ===
- Galaktion Tabidze Award
- Georgian Writers' Union Award
- Vladimir Mayakovsky Union Youth Prize
- Iakop Gogebashvili Medal

=== Bibliography ===
- "On the Ksani river": Poems (author). - Tbilisi, Merani, 1979.
- "Field Colors": Poems (Author). - Tbilisi, Merani, 1984.
- On the Road to Kartli: Poems (Author). - Tbilisi, Merani, 1988.
- "Waiting for the Sun": Poems (author). - Tbilisi, Nakaduli, 1990.
- "You will be saved by my prayer": Poems (author). - Tbilisi, Merani, 1997.
- "100 poems" (author). - Tbilisi, Intellect, 2001.
- "At least it was called Georgia": Poems (author). - Tbilisi, Intellect, 2010.
