= Ioseb Abakelia =

Georgian physician and medical scholar

- იოსებ აბაკელია
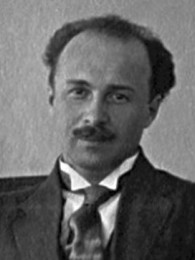
- Ioseb Abakelia in 1936
- Born: March 2, 1882
- Died: 1938 (aged 55–56)
- Occupations: Physician and medical scholar

Ioseb Abakelia (Georgian: იოსებ აბაკელია; March 2, 1882 – 1938) was a pioneering Georgian physician and medical scholar, specializing in the field of phthisiatry (study of tuberculosis).

== Biography ==
Abakelia was born in Kutaisi and studied medicine at the University of Moscow, graduating in 1911. In the 1910s he studied tuberculosis and in 1921 Abakelia published the first Georgian scientific study of tuberculosis. A year later he established the first laboratory in Georgia dedicated to the study of the disease in Tbilisi. He continued his work at the Tbilisi State University in 1926, and in 1930 he became a professor. He also founded the first Georgian Institute for the Study of Tuberculosis in 1930, directing it until 1938, when he was arrested and executed (shot) during the Great Purge.

He was the uncle of Tamar Abakelia, a well-known sculptor in Georgia.
