= Tahmasp =

Tahmasp or Tahmasb may refer to:

- Tahmasp I (reigned 1524–1576), Safavid shah of Persia
- Tahmasp II (reigned 1729–1732), Safavid shah of Persia
- Tahmasp Khan Jalayer, a general of Nader Shah
- Tahmasp Mirza Moayyed od-Dowleh (1805–1879/80), Qajar prince
- Tahmasb Mazaheri, Iranian politician and economist
- Tahmasb Quli, various people so named, including Nader Shah
- Tahmasb, a character in the Shahnameh, an epic poem written between 977 and 1010
