= Zurab Papaskiri =

Georgian historian

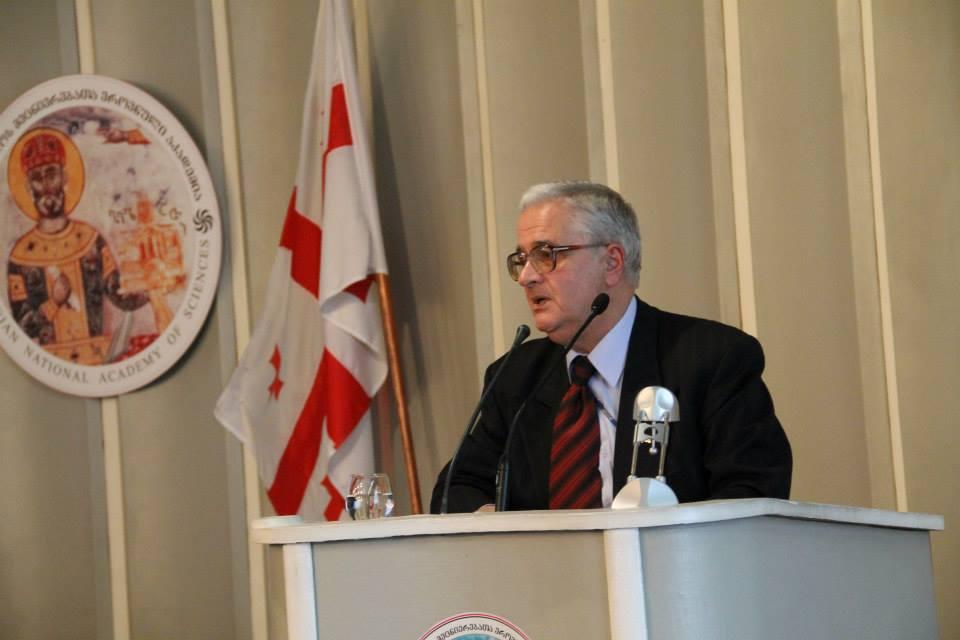
Zurab Papaskiri

Zurab Papaskiri (Georgian: ზურაბ პაპასქირი) is a Georgian Historian and public figure, academician of the Abkhazian Regional Academy of Sciences (1997), Doctor of Historical sciences (1991), Professor (1994), owner of the State Prize of Giorgi Shervashidze (1998), owner of Order of Honour (2013).

Zurab Papaskiri was born in 1950 in Zugdidi. He graduated from the Faculty of History of Tbilisi State University (1972). From 1972 to 1975, he was a post-graduate student of the Lomonosov Moscow State University. In 1978 Papaskiri received a PhD in history, in 1991 the degree of Doctor of historical sciences (Habilitation). Since 1976 he has worked at Sokhumi State University (since 1993 this university is based in Tbilisi). Since 2008 he has been head of the Scientific Work Coordination Service of the university, since 2007, deputy chairman of the main editorial board of the "Proceedings of the Sokhumi State University", and Editor-in-Chief of the „Proceedings of Sokhumi State University“. Humanities, Social and Political Sciences Series. Papaskiri is Chairman of the Abkhazian Organization of the Georgian Historical Society by Ekvtime Takaishvili, and Editor-in-Chief of the „Historical Researches“ ("Saistorio Dziebani"). also since 1998.

== Selected publications ==
- Abkhazia is Georgia: Historical perspective (co-author, editor). Tbilisi, publishing house: "Meridiani", 2021 (in Georgian). ISBN 978-9941-25-969-2.
- Why Abkhazia is Georgia. A True History (co-author, editor). Tbilisi, publishing house: "Meridiani", 2021 ISBN 978-9941-25-970-8
- On National, Political, and Cultural Identity of Contemporary Abkhazia. Publishing House „Meridiani“. Tbilisi, 2020.
- Georgia. Historical Past and Present. Collection of Works. Tbilisi: publishing house: "Meridiani", 2016, 644 pages (in Georgian)
- My Abkhazia. Memoirs and Recollections. Collection of Papers. Tbilisi: publishing house: "Meridiani", 2012 (in Russian) 604 pages. ISBN 978-9941-10-681-1
- Abkhazia: Unfalsified History (Book, in Russian, Summary in English). Second edition, revisedand updated. Tbilisi: publishing house: "Meridiani", 2010, ISBN 978-9941-0-1652-3 596 pages
- And Georgia Has Risen from Nikopsia to Daruband (Book, in Georgian). Sokhumi State University Publishing House.Tbilisi, 2009, ISBN 978-9941-0-1230-3. 630 pages
- Studies in History of Present-Day Abkhazia. Part II. 1917-1993. (Book, in Georgian, Summary in English and Russian). Tbilisi: publishing house: "Meridiani", 2007,480 pages
- Studies in History of Present-Day Abkhazia. Part I. From Ancient Times till 1917. (Book, in Georgian, Summary in English and Russian) Tbilisi: publishing house: "Meridiani", Tbilisi, 2004, ISBN 978-99928-0-693-7. 316 pages
- From David to David.From the History of International Relations of Georgia. 970s-1070s (Monograph, in Russian, Summary in English). Tbilisi, 2001, 116 pages
- Abkhazia is Georgia. Collection of Papers. Tbilisi, publishing house: "Agmashenebeli". 1998,304 pages
- Medieval Georgia at the International Scene. Georgia’s Foreign-Policy Status in the 1060s-1080s (Monograph, in Georgian). Publishing House: "Metsniereba". Tbilisi, 1991,50 pages
- Emergence of United Georgian Feudal State and Some Questions of Georgia’s Foreign-Policy Status (Monograph, in Georgian, Summary in Russian). Tbilisi, Tbilisi University Press. 1990, 225 pages.
- At the Origins of the Georgian-Russian Relations (Monograph, in Russian). Tbilisi, Tbilisi University Press, 1982, 151 pages
- Le catholicosat d’ “Abkhazie” et son statut historico-juridique. – Fondements historiques et ancrages culturels des langues. Serie monogrphique en sciences Humaines 20. Sous la direction de Ali Reguigui, Julie Boissonneault et Mzago Dokhtourichvili. Sadbury, Ontario, Canada, 2017 (ISBN 978-0-88667-094-8), pp. 39–68.
- On New Anti-Georgian Insinuations of Supporters of “Independent” Abkhazia. In connection with A. Epifantsev’s article “The Georgian Church: Paul Turned into Saul. The Question of the Church.” —Certain Aspects of Georgia-Russian Relations in Modern Historiography. Caucasus Region Political, Economical, and Security Issues. David Muskhelishvili editor. NOVA publishers. New York, 2014, pp. 9–28.
- The Byzantine Commonwealth and the International Status of the Georgian Political Units in the First Half of the 10th Century. – The Caucasus & Globalization. Journal of Social, Political and Economic Studies. Institute of studies of the Caucasus (Baku, Azerbaijan). CA&CC Press®. Sweden, 2011, Volume 5, Issue 3-4, pp. 126-144.
- A Question Mark in the History of Georgian-Seljuk Relations on the Eve of the Battle of Manzikert. – The Caucasus & Globalization. Journal of Social, Political and Economic Studies. Institute of studies of the Caucasus (Baku, Azerbaijan). CA&CC Press. Sweden, 2013, Volume 7, Issue 3-4, pp. 131-141
- Another look at one of the false historical postulates of the Abkhazian separatist ideology:on the question of Abkhazias political-state status in 1921-1931. – The Caucasus & Globalization. Journal of Social, Political and Economic Studies. Institute of studies of the Caucasus (Baku, Azerbaijan). CA&CC Press®. Sweden, 2012, Volume 6, Issue 2, pp. 168-180
- Abkhazia and the Abkhazians in the common Georgian ethno-cultural, political, and state expanse. Part I. – The Caucasus & Globalization. Journal of Social, Political and Economic Studies. Institute of studies of the Caucasus (Baku, Azerbaijan). CA&CC Press®. Sweden, 2008, Volume 2, Issue 2, pp. 105-121.
- Abkhazia and the Abkhazians in the common Georgian ethno-cultural, political, and state expanse. Part II. – The Caucasus & Globalization. Journal of Social, Political and Economic Studies. Institute of studies of the Caucasus (Baku, Azerbaijan). CA&CC Press®. Sweden, 2008, Volume 2, Issue 4, pp. 95-107.
- Zur Frage der nationalstaatlichen Mentalität des Herrscherhauses Scharvaschidse in Abchasien. – Georgica. Zeitschrift für Kultur, Sprache und Geshichte Georgiens und Kaukasiens. 31 Jahrgang 2008. SHAKER VERLAG. Aachen, S. 64-74.
- On National, Political and Cultural Self-Identity of the Sharvashidze Princedom. – Spekali Electronic Bilingual Scholarly Peer-Reviewed Journal of the Faculty of Humanities at Ivane Javakhishvili Tbilisi State University.

== Literature ==
Zurab Papaskiri – 60. Inscribing Annals is Talking the Truth. The Collection is dedicated to the 60th birth anniversary of the Doctor of Historical sciences, Professor Zurab Papaskiri. Sokhumi State University Press. Tbilisi – 2010-2013.
