= Avtandil Varsimashvili =

Georgian theatre and film director (born 1959)

- Born: 1959 10.11; Tbilisi, Georgia
- Occupations: Theatre and film director

Avtandil Varsimashvili (Georgian: ავთანდილ ვარსიმაშვილი; born 10 November 1959) is a Georgian theatre and film director. He is the artistic director of A. Griboedov State Academic Theatre and owner of Liberty Theatre Georgia and the director and producer of his private film company "Vars-Studio".

== Career ==
The collapse of the Soviet Union and wars in Caucasus had a very bad impact on the cultural life in Georgia. Varsimashvili left Rustaveli Theatre, where he used to work for 15 years and started working at "Caucasian TV and Radio Company". There he directed the first Georgian TV series, a horror genre "The House in the Old District".

In 1999 he was appointed as an artistic director of a Russian language Griboedov Theatre. After his appointment Griboedov Theatre very soon became one of the most successful theatres in Georgia. Under Varsimashvili, the theatre enjoyed a major renovation, took part in various tours abroad and hosted some of the very successful local and foreign plays.

In 2006 he received an Order of Friendship of the Russian federation for Georgian-Russian cultural relationships.

== Liberty Theatre ==
On March 31, 2001 Varsimashvili opened his private theatre Liberty Theatre (Georgian: თავისუფალი თეატრი), which very soon became a major Georgian theatre with an impact on local social and political life. In the contrast from other theatres, where the repertoire was composed of classical plays in a very traditional form, Liberty Theatre offered very realistic plays about modern social life in Georgia. The first play "The Entertainer" was about the life of an actor during 1992–1993 War in Abkhazia. The second play was "Jeans Generation" by David Doiashvili based on the events of Aeroflot Flight 6833.

In 2003 "Liberty Theatre" made a contribution in the Rose Revolution. As the theatre is situated just in front of the Government Chancellery (then President's residency), it was one of the main fronts against the incumbent government. In the days of the revolution, the theatre ran an anti-government show, called "Provocation". In the middle of the play, actors opened the entrance door of the theatre and shouted in the direction of the president's residency "Get out!".

After the revolution, Varsimashvili directed the inauguration of the new President of Georgia Mikheil Saakashvili. In 2008 he directed the second term inauguration as well.

Through his career Varsimashvili staged more than 80 theatre plays. Besides Georgia he also staged plays in Germany, Russia, Ukraine, Estonia and Finland.

His notable plays are: Shakespear's "Hamlet", "Titus Andronicus", "Ricard III", Gogol's "Revisor", "Wedding", "The Overcoat", Molière's "Don Juan", Dostoevsky's "Timid", "The House of the Dead", Tolstoi's "Kholstomer", Pushkin's "Don Juan", "King Sultan's Tale", Chekhov's "Life is Beautiful", Bulgakov's "Master and Marguerit", Brecht's "Caucasian Chalk Circle", "Fear and Misery of the Third Reich", "The Threepenny Opera", etc.

== Film career ==
Varsimashvili is also a film director.

In 2008 he directed a film version of his very popular play "Idiotokratia" (Idiotocracy). In 2009 he directed Kvelaferi Kargad Ikneba (Everything will be fine), which broke the all-time record of sold tickets in history of independent Georgia. After that he directed four more feature films: Midi Dzmao, Midi (Go on Brother), Ispakhan-Batumi, Bambaziis Samotkhe (Cotton Heaven), and Sakhli, Romelits Panjridan Gaipara (House that escaped from the window).

Avtandil Varsimashvili has been decorated by numerous titles: National State Order and Cavalier of Honor.

He is the professor of Tbilisi State University of Theatre and Film - head of director's department.
