= Nikoloz Mnatobishvili =

Georgian footballer

Personal information
- Date of birth: 27 September 1992 (age 34)
- Place of birth: Georgia
- Position: Defender

Senior career*
Years	Team	Apps	(Gls)
2012–2013	Dila Gori	1	(0)
2013	Margveti Zestaponi	0	(0)
2014	Dnepr Mogilev	23	(0)
2015–2017	Gagra	22	(0)
2018–2020	Shevardeni-1906 Tbilisi	6	(1)
- * Club domestic league appearances and goals as of 31 December 2020

Nikoloz Mnatobishvili (Georgian: ნიკა მნათობიშვილი; born 27 September 1992) is a Georgian former footballer.
