= Tamaz Somkhishvili =

Georgian-British businessman and sport executive

- თამაზ სომხიშვილი
- Born: June 22, 1957 (age 68); Tbilisi, Georgian SSR
- Citizenship: Georgia; United Kingdom; Russia
- Occupation(s): businessman, sport executive

Tamaz Valeryanovich Somkhishvili (Georgian: თამაზ სომხიშვილი; born 22 June 1957, Tbilisi, Georgian SSR) is a Russian and Georgian businessman and sport executive.

Somkhishvili is the founder of the TS Holding business group, which unites more than a dozen Georgian companies. Also, he is the founder and CFO of a number of Lukoil subsidiaries. From 2017 to 2022, he was president of the Georgian National Sport Shooting Federation. He was one of the richest people in Georgia in 2013.

He is accused of organizing criminal schemes in Kyiv and Odesa related to the confiscation of land from municipal ownership. Somkhishvili is also a part of Pandora Papers investigation. In the end of 2022, it was revealed through several independent journalist investigations that Somkhishvili's company in Georgia is connected to the contractors of the Russian Ministry of Defense, repairing and modernizing Russian combat aircraft used against Ukraine.

== Early years and education ==
Tamaz Somkhishvili was born on June 22, 1957, in Georgia. In 1984, he graduated from the Tobolsk Pedagogical Institute, Faculty of Physics and Mathematics, and in 1994 from Tyumen State University, Faculty of Finance and Credit.

In 2002, he defended his PhD thesis on "Conditions and sources of financing for investment in the development of the oil industry" at the Russian Presidential Academy of National Economy and Public Administration.

In 2022, the Kyiv City State Administration received a letter from the Ministry of Justice of Ukraine, citing data from the Main Intelligence Directorate of the Ministry of Defense of Ukraine, stating that Tamaz Somkhishvili, whose company was at that time attempting to sue Kyiv for $100 million, is a citizen of the Russian Federation. It was reported by Espreso TV and DELO.ua.

== Citizenship ==
According to the Deputy Minister of the Ministry of Justice of Ukraine Tamaz Somkhishvili reportedly used eight different passports to cross the state border of Ukraine according to the State Border Service of Ukraine. While Somkhishvili's Russian citizenship remains valid, as was reported by the Ukraine Ministry of Justice, the Ukrainian authorities are lacking any information about its revocation or annulment.

== Career ==
In 1992–1993, he was the founder and CEO of Lukoil (Tyumen, Russian Federation).

In 1993–1999, he was the founder and commercial director of Lukoil Markets.

From 1995 to 2008, together with Lukoil and Rosneft, he was the founder-partner and general director of OJSC Rosneftexport. Founder-partner since 1995 (co-founders of Lukoil and Rosneft).

In 2001–2005, he was the founder and head of the representative office in Moscow of Danao Engineering, specializing in the extraction and processing of both raw materials and waste.

From 2002 to 2004, he was a shareholder of OAO Tomskaya Neft, a pipeline construction and field management company. In 2002–2008, he was a member of the board of Agroco, LLC Agricultural Investment Company.

In 2007, he received British citizenship.

In 2015, Tamaz Somkhishvili founded the Education, Science and Technology Foundation for Tomorrow's Success in Georgia, now TS Holding.

In 2017 he succeeded Kakhaberi Sikharulidze as President of the Georgian National Sport Shooting Federation. He was unanimously elected president in an early election and reporting conference held at the Radisson Blu Iveria Hotel, Tbilisi. He was attracted by the fact that shooting sport, along with martial arts, was one of the main sources of Olympic medals for Georgia.

In 2018, Tamaz Somkhishvili managed to build a state-of-the-art international level sports complex with a large capacity. It also trained junior and amateur athletes. Many countries are interested in the Georgian shooting club. The only problem that has not been solved yet is the lack of professional referees. In 2021 he resigned at his own request and was succeeded by Mamuka Merkviladze.

On November 18, 2021, Tamaz Somkhishvili sent a notice of the dispute to the Cabinet of Ministers of Ukraine and a proposal to amicably resolve the investment dispute for damages in accordance with the Agreement between the Government of Ukraine and the Government of the United Kingdom of Great Britain and Northern Ireland on the promotion and mutual protection of investments. As the owner of Kyiv-Terminal, Somkhishvili asked the President to protect his rights as an investor in a dispute with the Kyiv municipality over the complete reconstruction and rehabilitation of Kharkivska Square in Kyiv. The issue stems from an investment agreement signed on May 18, 2007, in which Somkhishvili's company Kyivterminal paid 13.5 million dollars to the municipality as a debtor after winning the tender. The project was supposed to include the construction of 125,000 sq/m, with an option for the investor to build an additional 180,000 sq/m, making it one of the largest infrastructure projects in the capital, with a potential capitalization of 200 million dollars. At the same time, according to the Deputy Chief Architect of Kyiv, the company is not planning to carry out work on the reconstruction of the square. The investment agreement was terminated due to violation of the law, forged signatures and false information.

== Cooperation with the Ministry of Defense of the Russian Federation ==
The Ukrainian edition of Dzerkalo Tyzhnia published an investigation by journalist Sergiy Ivanov that Tamaz Somkhishvili's company is a contractor of the Russian Ministry of Defense and fulfills its orders for the repair of Russian army combat aircraft used in the Russian invasion of Ukraine since 2022.

On January 25, 2023, the Georgian 1st TV channel posted an investigation of the project "Saturday Night" which was adapted by the Ukrainian journalist and author of the program "Antipodes' Serhiy Ivanov. The journalists found out that Somkhishvili Tamaz has an influence on the Tbilisi Aircraft Manufacturing (Tbilaviamsheni) and TAM Management company, which is located on the territory of the plant and operates on its capacities. According to the former director of the plant, Vazhi Tordia, who later became a co-owner and director of TAM Management, Tbilaviashmeni owns 20% of the Russian company Sukhoi Sturmoviks. This company is engaged in the repair of Russian aircraft, one of which was shot down over Bakhmut and was used against Ukrainian Armed Forces by the Wagner Group.

Taras Dumych, partner with Wolf Theiss and counsel to Tamaz Somkhishvili, launched his own investigation and found that the claims were "entirely baseless." Not only did Somkhishvili have no contact with the Ministry of Defense, but several state-owned Ukrainian enterprises held minority shares in the company. Ukraine's Foreign Intelligence Agency stated that they had no data that linked Somkhishvili to the alleged Russian connections.

== Patronage activities ==
Tamaz Somkhishvili is an active participant and patron of the Georgian diaspora in European countries, in particular in the United Kingdom. As a parishioner of the Georgian Orthodox Church, he became the founder of the parish of the church in London, bought for her the building of the temple, which became one of the few Georgian churches in Western Europe. For this, Somkhishvili received a personal commendation from Georgian Prime Minister George Kvirikashvili.

In Georgia, Tamaz Somkhishvili is one of the largest patrons of the Saint Andrew the First-Called Georgian University of the Patriarchate of Georgia.

== Personal life ==
He is married to Nino Somkhishvili. Their daughter, Lia Somkhishvili, died in March 2021 and was buried in London's Cathedral of the Nativity of the Saviour.

His ex-wife is Elena Viktorovna Vasilets, a poet, writer, and member of the Union of Writers of Russia. She was born in Armyansk, Ukrainian SSR.

His son is Giorgi Tamazovich Somkhishvili.
