= Nikoloz Gruzinsky =

Prince Nikoloz Iakobis Dze Bagration-Gruzinsky (Georgian: ნიკოლოზ იაკობის ძე ბაგრატიონი გრუზინსკი) (1783–1861) was a Georgian royal prince (batonishvili) of Bagrationi dynasty.

He was the son of Iakob Gruzinsky. In 1812–1823, he served as Valet de chambre.

Prince Iakob had 4 children:

- Aleksandra Gruzinskaya (died 1888)
- Constantine Gruzinskaya (died 1884)
- Ivane Gruzinsky (1831–1898)
- Pyotr Gruzinsky (1840–1892)

He was buried at Vagankovo Cemetery in Moscow.
