= Mirian Burduli =

Georgian rugby union player (born 1991)

- Born: January 6, 1991 (age 35) Tbilisi, Georgia
- Height: 1.87 m (6 ft 1 1/2 in)
- Weight: 120 kg (18 st 13 lb)

Rugby union career
- Position: Tighthead Prop
Senior career
Years	Team	Apps	(Points)
2015-	US Carcassonne	43	(0)
- Correct as of 17 August 2017

Mirian Burduli (born 6 January 1991) is a Georgian rugby union player. He plays for Georgia and for US Carcassonne in Pro D2.
