= Avtandil Demetrashvili =

Avtandil Demetrashvili (born 21 December 1941 in Patara Toneti, Tetritskaro) is a former member of the Constitutional Court of Georgia. In 1967 graduated from the law faculty of Permi State University and undertook graduate studies at Moscow State University; is a candidate of legal science, Assistant Professor. Worked for the Militia High School of Tbilisi, the law faculty of Tbilisi State University named after Ivane Javakhishvili, was the Secretary to the State Constitutional Commission, Head of the Office of drafting Constitutional Acts operating at the Staff of the Head of State, Chief State Counsellor, Head of the Department of Modern Law Systems at Tbilisi State University.

Demetrashvili was appointed a member of the Constitutional Court of Georgia on 29 December 1995 by the President of Georgia. On 24 July 1996 was elected the President of the Constitutional Court of Georgia. On 5 July 2001 the term of office of a member of the Constitutional Court of Georgia ceased.

Demetrashvili is married, has two children and three grandchildren.
