= Silauri =

Silauri სილაური
- Village
- Location within Georgia Location within Guria
- Coordinates: 41°59′57″N 41°59′57″E
- Country: Georgia
- Mkhare: Guria
- Municipality: Ozurgeti
- Elevation: 100 m (330 ft)

Population (2014)
  - Total: 531
- Time zone: UTC+4 (Georgian Time)

Silauri (Georgian: სილაური) is a village in the Ozurgeti Municipality of Guria in western Georgia.
