= Levan Akhvlediani =

Georgian sports official

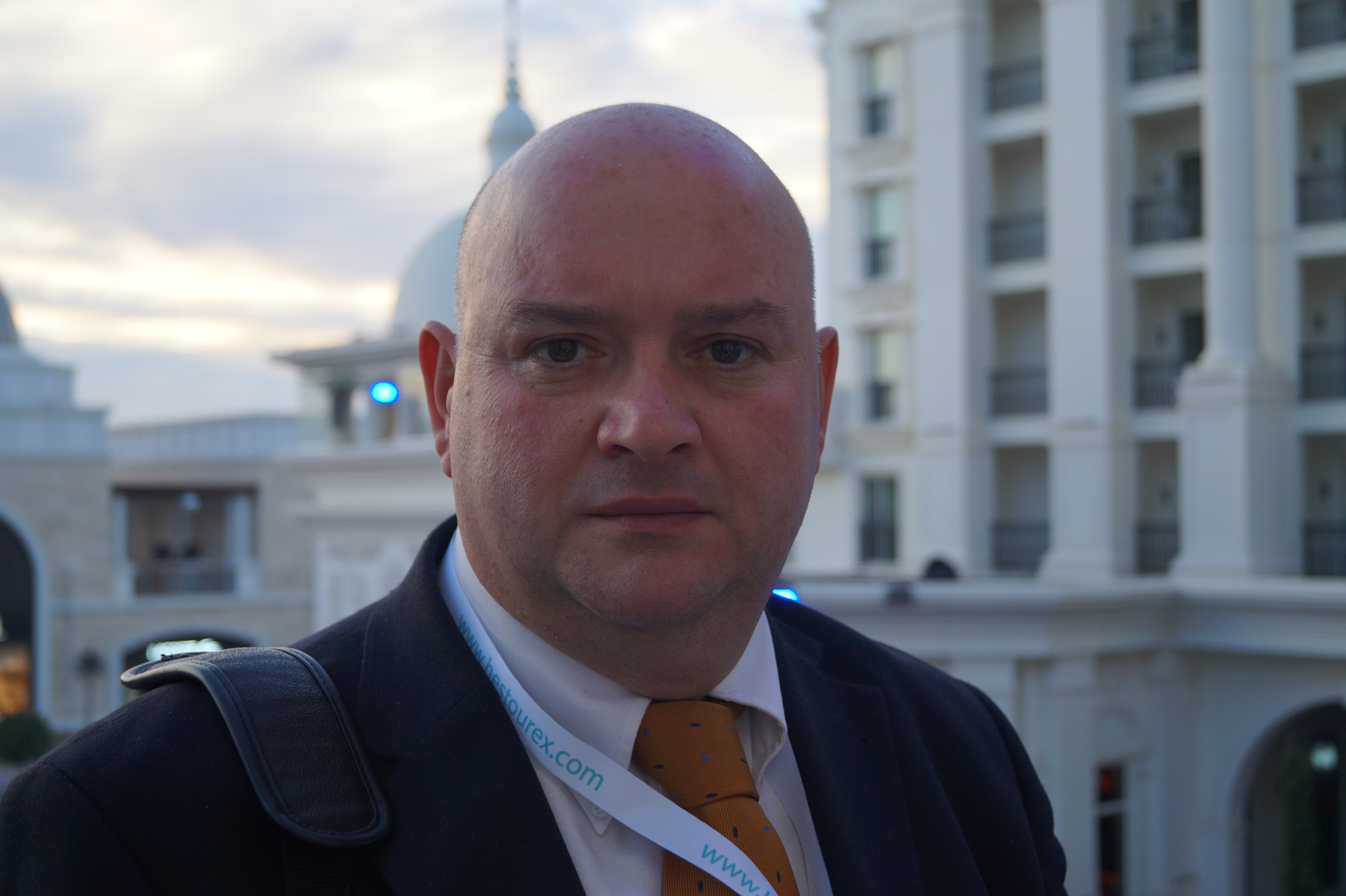

Levan Akhvlediani (Georgian: ლევან ახვლედიანი, born 10 March 1969) is a Georgian sports official who served as the president of the Georgian Volleyball Federation from 2001 to 2013.

Akhvlediani is a currently a member of the Beach Volleyball Commission for the Fédération Internationale de Volleyball (FIVB), and in the past has served on the FIDV's Development Commission.

== 2008 Olympic Games ==
After Akhvlediani was elected president of the Georgian Volleyball Federation in 2001, he decided to recruit Brazilian beach volleyball players with the intent of attracting more players to Georgia's Black Sea coast. After contacting a Brazilian coach, they were able to select high-calibre players—who were not likely to make the highly competitive Brazilian team—and invite them to play for Georgia. "Every business needs success so I looked for the shortest way to success," he told Reuters. By 2008, Brazilians Renato Gomes and Jorge Terceiro, and Andrezza Martins and Cristine Santanna received citizenship in time to compete for Georgia at the 2008 Olympic Games in Beijing.

While the Olympics were being held, the Russian-Georgian diplomatic crisis escalated to the Russo-Georgian War. The volleyball rivalry that pitted Martins and Santanna against Russians Alexandra Shiryaeva and Natalya Uryadova created international headlines because of the war; Akhvlediani spoke regularly about the mood among the Georgians and the decision to stay in Beijing. The No. 22 Georgian women's pair ultimately upset the No. 15 Russians in the quarterfinals. The Russians stated that they did not lose to Georgians but to Brazilians, and Uryadova stated that if Martins and Santanna were real Georgians, the war would have affected them. Akhvlediani criticized the Russians' comments as poor sportsmanship.

Following the Olympics, Akhvlediani was unanimously re-elected as president of the Georgian Volleyball Federation through 2013.

== Officiating ==
Akhvlediani worked as an event director for FIVB during the 2012 Olympic Games in London. He was appointed president of the technical panel at the men's gold-medal final in London, and was the first Georgian to serve in this role at the Olympics.

He has also acted as tournament director for international events, including the 2013 FIVB Beach Volleyball World Tour.

Since 2014, he has been president of Georgia's Sports Development Fund.
