= Avtandil Silagadze =

Georgian economist and politician

Avtandil Silagadze (Georgian: ავთანდილ სილაგაძე) (born on February 5, 1954) is a Georgian economist and politician. He has been an Academician of the Georgian National Academy of Sciences since 2013 and was a Corresponding Member of the Georgian National Academy of Sciences from 2001 to 2013. From 2003 until 2008, he was a Member of the Parliament of Georgia.

== Education ==
Silagadze graduated from Ivane Javakhishvili Tbilisi State University (TSU)'s Faculty of Economics in 1977 and completed post-graduate courses at the same university in 1980. He earned his doctorate in 1989 and became a professor the following year.

== Career ==
Since 2014, he has been the Professor and Chair of the Department of International Economics and Economic History in the Faculty of Economics and Business at Ivane Javakhishvili Tbilisi State University (TSU). From 2009 to 2013, he was a Full Professor of Tbilisi University of International Relations. In 2019, he was awarded a permanent position as professor at TSU.

In 2004, he won the Georgian State Prize in Science and Technology.
