= Mikheil Tsinamdzghvrishvili =

Mikheil Tsinamdzghvrishvili (1882–1956) was a Georgian physician and academic, member of the Georgian National Academy of Sciences from 1946.

Born on 22 May [O.S. 10 May] 1882 in Surami, Georgia (then in the Russian Empire), Tsinamdzghvrishvili studied medicine at Kharkov University. He came back to his native Georgia in 1915 and settled in Tbilisi. He worked at the Faculty of Medicine, later the Tbilisi Medical Institute. In 1946 he founded the Institute of Cardiology, which he headed until his death.

Tsinamdzghvrishvili died in Tbilisi on 28 December 1956, and the Institute of Cardiology was named after him in 1957. A street in central Tbilisi also bears his name. He was awarded the Order of Lenin and the Order of the Red Banner of Labour.
