= Mikheil Asatiani =

Georgian psychiatrist

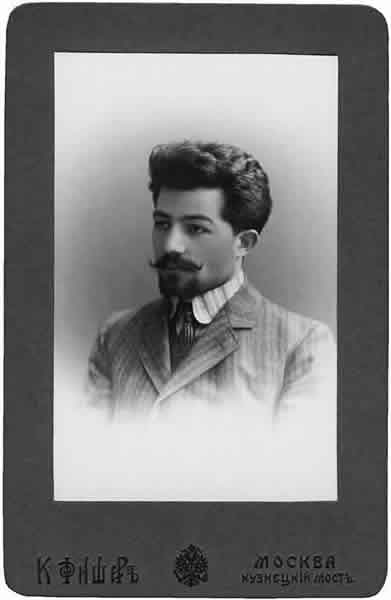
Mikheil Asatiani. 1907

Mikheil Asatiani (10 May 1882 in Tbilisi – 20 January 1938 in Tbilisi) was a prominent Georgian psychiatrist, one of the founders of scientific psychiatry in Georgia. He graduated from Moscow State University in 1907 and began work at the psychiatric clinic in Moscow. He eventually became head of the Department of Psychiatry of the Tbilisi State University in 1921 and served on the editorial board of the journal Psikhoterapia. In 1925, he established and headed until his death the Psychiatric Research Institute in Tbilisi, which posthumously was named after him. He directed hundreds of scientific researches and produced some 40 works on clinical psychiatry and psychotherapy. He is an author of original method of "reproductive experiences".

== Death ==
One year before his death Mikheil was asked by an unknown youngster to visit a house on a given address and see a sick relative of the youngster. He accepted and when he came to the address, surprised householders asked whence he had known the address. Then he learns that that youngster had long before been died. Just after this he suffered from mental disorder leading to his death in a year. The fact that he could see, though temporarily, souls is said to be an omen of death.
