= Gvachvene sheni khma season 2 =

Television game show season

Gvachvene sheni khma
- Season 2
- Starring: Salome Bakuradze; Oto Nemsadze; Tamar Pkhakadze; Archil Sologashvili
- Hosted by: Tika Patsatsia (Note: Season highlights: Seti (ep. 22) designated as new players, which include members Eka Kandelaki, Sofo Maskhulia, and the returning Tika Patsatsia.; For the "ABBA Night" (ep. 26), Archil Sologashvili initially played as a mystery singer before joining him into the panelist role.)
- Winners: Good singers: 23; Bad singers: 9
- No. of episodes: Regular: 32; Special: 1; Overall: 33

Release
- Original network: Rustavi 2
- Original release: 10 September 2024 – 26 October 2025

Season chronology
- ← Previous; Season 1

The second season of the Georgian television mystery music game show Gvachvene sheni khma premiered on Rustavi 2 on 10 September 2024.

== Gameplay ==
=== Format ===
According to the original South Korean rules, the guest artist and contestant(s) must attempt to eliminate bad singers during its game phase. At the final performance, the last remaining mystery singer is revealed as either good or bad by means of a duet between them and one of the guest artists. (Note: Gameplay note: The number of contestants are set to one or a pair.)

If the last remaining mystery singer is good, the contestant(s) win(s) ₾3,000; this is also applied to the winning bad singer selected by them.

=== Rounds ===
1. Phonogram (Georgian: ფონოგრამა)
  Six mystery singers are divided into pairs, in which each compete a lip sync battle against each other.
2. Broken phone (Georgian: გატეხილი ტელეფონი)
  The guest artist and contestant(s) are presented with a video package containing possible clues by one of the mystery singers of their choice.
3. Interrogation (Georgian: დაკითხვა)
  The guest artist and contestant(s) may ask questions to the remaining mystery singers. Good singers are required to give truthful responses, while the bad singers must lie.

== Episodes ==
=== Guest artists ===
Legend:
Good singer
Bad singer
— The contestant(s) won the money.
— The winning bad singer stole the money.

2024 games
Episode		Guest artist (Note: Players' notes: For the returning guest artists (who also include foreigners and former good singers), names are displayed in italics.; For the mixed groups, names who identified as bad singers are displayed in italics.)	Contestant(s)	Mystery singers (In their respective numbers and aliases)					
#	Date	Guest artist	Contestant(s)	Elimination order					Winner
#	Date	Guest artist	Contestant(s)	Phonogram			Broken phone	Interrogation	Winner
1	10 September 2024	Irma Sokhadze	Levan Saginashvili and Irakli Zirakashvili → ₾3,000	5. Ani Nozadze; (Beth Harmon)	3. Hana Gorgadze; (Burnuta)	2. Ani Namgaladze; (Juliet)	6. Firo Lomiashvili; (Tormund Giantsbane)	1. Giorgi Jamalashvili; (Ragnar Lodbrok)	4. Guliko Tofchishvili; Frida Kahlo
2	17 September 2024	Marita Rokhvadze	Svaneti Ranch Boys (Levan Maghradze and Davit Kvirikadze) → ₾3,000	4. Tatia Sordia; (Nurse)	5. Ekaterine Jamburia; (Artist)	1. Lazare Beridze; (Watchmaker)	3. Lile Gognadze; (Hardware Accessory Vlogger)	2. Irakli Gabliani; (P.E. Teacher)	6. Giorgi Ghviniashvili; Electrician
3	25 September 2024	Nutsa Buzaladze	RedBlack Dance Studio (Beka and Nika Nozadze) → ₾3,000	4. Khatia Guruli; (Queen of the Year)	1. Tamar Gvarjaladze; (Secretary)	5. Saba Kobalava; (Rapper #1)	2. Mamuka Pavliashvili; (Tshkinvali Theatre Actor)	3. Nina Struzhkin; (Bookshop Consultant)	6. Nino Burjanadze; Sketch Artist
4	2 October 2024	Nutsa Topuria	Sukhishvili Georgian National Ballet (Nino Jokhadze and Natia Bakuradze) → ₾3,000	5. Salome Katuchia; (Promo Girl)	2. Sofo Tsivtsivadze; (Plaster Artist)	6. Irakli Mania; (Sailor)	3. Keti Kantiladze; (Costume Designer)	1. Koke Kakitashvili; (Footballer)	4. Eduard Arzumanov; Baker
5	9 October 2024	Nino Chkheidze	Madonna Koidze and Liza Vadachkoria → ₾3,000	6. Teimuraz Zavrukhin; (Fireplace Specialist)	5. Theo Kikalishvili; (Hotel Owner)	3. Elene Kapanadze; (Tailor)	4. Dachi Dodashvili; (Jeet Kune Do Instructor)	1. Mirangula Manjavidze; (Tour Guide)	2. Mariam Jamrulidze; Pilates Instructor
6	16 October 2024	Ana Uznadze	Tatiana Kvekveskiri → ₾0	3. Zura Kheladze; (Race Car Driver)	2. Nikoloz Lobzhanidze; (Panduri Player)	6. Thea Japaridze; (Qigong Practitioner)	1. Salome Bezashvili; (Train Conductor)	4. Kakha Pashurushvili; (Hunter)	5. Luka Kankava; Flamenco Dancer
7	23 October 2024	Poncho	Nino Lejava → ₾3,000	4. Eter Gogiashvili; (Pastry Chef #1)	5. Giorgi Vatiashvili; (Biker)	3. Mariam Kapanadze; (Landscape Designer)	2. Irakli Chabiev; (Web Developer)	6. Ilia Menabde; (Taxi Driver)	1. Tamta Kifiani; Folklorist
8	30 October 2024	Nugzar Ergemlidze	Keti Chkheidze → ₾3,000	2. Bichiko Ochigava; (Journalist)	6. Aleksandre Gogitidze; (Chess Player)	1. Ekaterine Kantidze; (Dishwasher)	4. Nino Dvalishvili; (Psychotherapist)	5. Ani Avchagheli; (Veterinarian)	3. Giorgi Lazviashvili; Culinary Chef
9	6 November 2024	Tamara Gachechiladze	Giga Ochkhikidze → ₾3,000	1. Giorgi Nizharadze; (Mario Cimarro Fan)	2. Mika Surguladze; (Confectioner)	5. Mariam Sibashvili; (Ballroom Dancer)	4. Keti Tsertsvadze; (Gold Appraiser)	3. Alexandre Darashvili; (Chinese Cafeteria Supervisor)	6. Zura Abuladze; Restaurant Manager
10	13 November 2024	Zura Manjavidze	Tamar Vashalomidze → ₾3,000	3. Esma Shonia; (Folk Festival Volunteer)	4. Levan Soktoghli; (Fitness Instructor)	2. Akaki Bagashvili; (Wardrobe Stylist)	1. Zanda Kontselidze; (Hiphop Dancer)	5. Giorgi Petriashvili; (Judge)	6. Khatia Khutsidze; Tourism Coordinator
11	20 November 2024	Giorgi Dzotsenidze	Nino Mumladze → ₾3,000	6. Luka Razmadze; (Bodyguard)	3. Tamar Eristavi; (Biker Girl)	4. Tsotne Lomidze; (Video Game Designer)	2. Irakli Mataradze; (Firefighter)	5. Lika Gagnidze; (Salon Manager)	1. Mariam Sarkiashvili; English Teacher
12	27 November 2024	Lasha Ramishvili	Basa and Tamriko Potskishvili → ₾3,000	3. Lasha Todua; (Kingpin)	5. Nikoloz Pirtakhia; (Pizzaiolo)	2. Beka Aghdgomelashvili; (Gondolier)	4. Nini Gorgodze; (Harlequin)	1. Kesane Imerlishvili; (Rococo Princess)	6. Natia Mosiashvili; Neapolitan Girl
13	24 December 2024	Nino Dzotsenidze	Davit Liklikadze → ₾0	4. Nina Giorgadze; (Car Racer)	1. Temo Okropiridze; (Frisbee Player)	5. Mariam Goguadze; (Football Referee)	6. Achi Revazishvili; (Tennis Player)	3. Salome Makasarashvili; (Rugby Player)	2. Archil Gvanishvili; Cyclist

2025 games
Episode		Guest artist	Contestant(s)	Mystery singers (In their respective numbers and aliases)					
#	Date	Guest artist	Contestant(s)	Elimination order					Winner
#	Date	Guest artist	Contestant(s)	Phonogram			Broken phone	Interrogation	Winner
14	7 January 2025	Tika Jamburia	Jano Izoria → ₾3,000	1. Nini Kiknavelidze; (Black Swan)	2. Mishka Gelovani; (Trainbearer)	4. Luka Imedashvili; (Dracula)	5. Lika Berghelidze; (Alice)	3. Davit Tsvartsvadze; (Mad Hatter)	6. Sofo Kubriashvili; Witch
15	14 January 2025	Veriko Turashvili	Ilia Sulamanidze and Oto Bazerashvili → ₾3,000	5. Romeo Akubardzhia; (Stuntman)	6. Elina Gedenidze; (Camerawoman)	4. Nutsa Abishonashvili; (Gypsy Dancer)	3. Irakli Todua; (Self-taught Artist)	2. Nina Tskvariashvili; (Karaoke Queen)	1. Giorgi Tatishvili; Bioengineer
16	21 January 2025	Gia Davitiani	Maka Dzagania and Giga Tsertsvadze → ₾0	6. Mariam Kurashvili; (Psychic)	1. Mariam Nuralashvili; (Backing Vocalist)	3. Mariam Kakauridze; (Diplomat)	4. Irakli Bulia; (Turkish Singer)	5. Zura Shubitidze; (Construction Worker)	2. Beka Menteshashvili; Baker
17	28 January 2025	Guram Lomidze	Avtandil → ₾0	5. Keta Tsiklauri; (Nani Bregvadze's Fan)	6. Kvicha Khvichia; (Zura Doijashvili's Fan)	2. Tamir Utiashvili; (Tika Patsatsia's Fan)	3. Tornike Maisuradze; (Poncho's Fan)	1. Tedo Gorgodze; (Vakhtang Kikabidze's Fan)	4. Shorena Tsurtsumia; Lela Tsurtsumia's Fan
18	4 February 2025	Misho Javakhishvili	Erisioni (Giorgi Nozadze and Ani Dzeria) → ₾3,000	1. Nikoloz Jobadze	5. Giorgi Kirakozashvili	6. Mariam Babua	2. Nino Jimutia	3. Achi Jaiani	4. Lali Burduli
19	11 February 2025	Oto Kovziridze	Ana Nozelidze → ₾3,000	5. Shota Pruidze; (Bartender)	4. Luka Kirvalidze; (Magician)	6. Lana Japaridze; (Flapper Girl)	1. Salome Kalandadze; (Cosplayer)	3. Mariam Karvalidze; (Miss Tbilisi)	2. Datuna Tsulukidze; Auto Dealer
20	18 February 2025	Achiko Nizharadze	Manana Ramishvili → ₾3,000	3. Giorgi Chokhonelidze; (Postman)	4. Aleksandre Balanchivadze; (Antique Dealer)	1. Luka Chubinidze; (Photographer)	5. Ana Zazashvili; (Audrey Hepburn Impersonator)	6. Jessica Cholaria; (Housekeeper)	2. Ana Maria Iakobashvili; ASMR Influencer
21	25 February 2025	Dato Kenchiashvili	Jaba Kiladze → ₾0	6. Leyla Aliyeva; (Mugham Singer)	3. Anna Rezesidze; (Boxer)	4. Guro Churgulia; (Bass Guitarist)	2. Lexo Amirejibi; (Metallurgist)	5. Ninia Abashidze; (Poetess)	1. Henry Karbishvili; Record Producer
22	4 March 2025	Indira Jgernaia	Seti → ₾3,000	4. Nino Kvlividze; (Lecturer)	6. Thea Giorgidze; (Bistro Performer)	1. Nutsa Modebadze; (Acoustic Guitarist)	2. Nini Kapanadze; (Bookseller)	5. Mari Makharashvili; (Food Safety Specialist)	3. Tamta Chelidze; Majorette
23	8 July 2025 (Note: This episode was originally scheduled to continue on 11 March 2025, only to be suddenly occupied by an 11th season of Georgia's Got Talent in its timeslot instead.)	Koba Chefkhodze	Tamar Adamia and Aleko Makharoblishvili → ₾3,000	5. Ishamin Naskida Churgulashvili	3. Luka Khutsishvili	6. Nina Nikabadze	1. Ani Stepanishvili	2. Tatia Dolidze	4. Otar Nitroshvili
24	15 July 2025	Dato Archvadze	Roland Okropiridze → ₾0	4. Giorgi Silakadze; (Fisherman)	3. Mikael Shermazanashvili; (Housekeeper)	6. Zaza Bichikashvili; (Flautist)	5. Salome Kokoriani; (Marguerite de Sevres)	2. Nini Minadze; (Caregiver)	1. Giorgi Dadianidze; Karachokheli Dancer
25	22 July 2025	Elene Pochkhua	Tako Abashidze → ₾0	3. Tamuna Mania	6. Nika Gorgodze	1. Imeda Abzianidze	5. Salome Gachechiladze	2. Ana Kushibadze	4. Irakli Gogokhia
26	7 September 2025	Marita Rokhvadze	Asmat Tkabladze → ₾3,000	4. Archil Sologashvili	1. Giorgi Akhalkatsishvili	3. Mariam Girianashvili	6. Nikoloz Tsutsunashvili	2. Mariam Keburia	5. Ninutsa Gelashvili
27	14 September 2025	Ana Uznadze	Stella Koch and Aleqsi Kikvidze → ₾3,000	5. Kristine Jgerenaia; (Session Guitarist)	1. Davit Kochivari; (Fuel Delivery Driver)	6. Davit Kalandadze; (Brand Manager)	2. Ekuna Failodze; (Waitress)	3. Nini Chekhashvili; (Ukulele Player)	4. Levan Zhvania; Bakery Supplier
28	21 September 2025	Lasha Glonti	Tedo Bekauri → ₾3,000	6. Rati Simonia; (Busker)	2. Giorgi Kakiashvili; (Waiter)	4. Salome Goginashvili; (Meteorologist)	3. Dima Khakhutashvili; (Gardener)	5. Nino Makhdiashvili; (Pastry Chef #2)	1. Mariam Jishkariani; Georgian History Teacher
29	28 September 2025	Dodona Namoradze	Nino Tarkhan-Mouravi and Temiko Chichinadze → ₾3,000	1. Desi Sakhvadze; (Fiorella Morelli)	2. Lana Kharaishvili; (Hürrem Sultan)	4. Nino Mumladze; (María López de Carreño)	5. Elena Leshkasheli; (Kassandra Rangel Arocha)	6. Angela Akofiani; (Guadalupe Zambrano Santos)	3. Tina Natenadze; Guadalupe Santos
30	12 October 2025	Manana Todadze	Khivcha Maghlakelidze and Mari Chakhvadze → ₾0	2. Khvicha Gamtsemlidze; (Postman)	5. Luka Sokhashvili; (Bistro Singer)	6. Lali Koshoridze; (Fashion Designer)	4. Mariana Lalieva; (Theatre Actress)	1. Tatia Kurtanidze; (Newspaper Editor)	3. Tami Gholijashvili; Surreal Artist
31	19 October 2025	Oto Kovziridze	Vaska Grigarashvili → ₾3,000	3. Revaz Bakhtadze; (Camera Operator)	6. Luka Ghvinjilia; (Orera Doppelgänger)	1. Zurab Khurtsidze; (Doctor)	4. Inga Jikidze; (Radio Announcer)	5. Lizi Kotrikadze; (Seawoman)	2. Teona Givishvili; Piano Teacher
32	26 October 2025	Temo Rtskhiladze	Bedina → ₾0	6. Khatia Tefnadze; (Radio DJ)	5. Data "Amdatta" Zhgenti; (Rapper #2)	4. Tamta Tefnadze; (Housewife)	2. Mate Kuriani; (Lamp Maker)	3. Lizi Datunashvili; (Confectionery Enthusiast)	1. Mari Tsabutashvili; Electrical Forewoman

=== Panelists ===
Legend:
Regular panelist
Additional panelist
Guest panelist

Apps		Panelists in attendance (Sorted by first appearance, with episode designations)
g#	p#	Panelists in attendance (Sorted by first appearance, with episode designations)
32	2	Tamar Pkhakadze and Archil Sologashvili (1–32)
29	1	Salome Bakuradze (1–6, 8–19, 21, 23–32)
28	1	Oto Nemsadze (1–20, 22–24, 26–28, 31–32)
13	1	Gigi Dedalamazishvili (1–12, 15)
4	1	Zura Gorgadze (14, 16, 23, 26)
3	1	Keti Salakaia (22, 25–26)
2	6	Zura Manjavidze (13, 25); Giorgi Dzotsenidze (18, 29); Tako Chorgolashvili (19, 24); Nino Chkheidze (20, 29); Lasha Ramishvili (21, 30); Sopo Bedia (21, 31)
1	8	Nuki Koshkelishvili (7); Mariam Sanogo (17); Marita Rokhvadze (20); Ninutsa Orjonikidze (22); Dato Archvadze (27); Malkhaz Kvrivishvili (28); Lasha Dvalishvili (30); Tika Jamburia (32)

== New Year's Eve Singing Contest (31 December 2024) ==
Also in this season, a second singing contest was held in the last day of 2024, featuring some of invited mystery singers return to perform, with the winner receiving ₾10,000.

Legend:
Winner

Gvachvene sheni khma season 2 — New Year's Eve singing contest performances
Backstage host: Tako Chorgolashvili; Judges: Salome Bakuradze, Gigi Dedalamazishvili (Mgzavrebi), Oto Nemsadze, Tamar Pkhakadze, and Nato Metonidze
Performer(s)	Song(s)
Guri Chelidze (s1 ep. 20) and Niko Sokhadze (s1 ep. 24)	"Taia" (თაია) — Vakhtang Kikabidze
Dachi Dodashvili (s2 ep. 5)	"Are You Gonna Be My Girl" — Jet
Ilia Menabde (s2 ep. 7)	"No Expectations, No Meetings" (არც მოლოდინი არც შეხვედრები) — Jansug Kakhidze
Salome Khaniashvili (s1 ep. 35)	"I'm Going to Alazani Tomorrow" (ხვალ მივდივარ ალაზანში) — Georgian hunters' song
Nino Dvalishvili (s2 ep. 8)	"I Love Rock 'n' Roll" — Joan Jett and the Blackhearts
Luka Obgadze (s1 ep. 20)	"Kakheti, my Kakheti" (კახეთო ჩემო კახეთო) — Natia Koroglishvili; cover by Alilo Ensemble
Nini Malkhazishvili (s1 ep. 33)	"Oh, You're Welcome" (ახ ტურფავ) — Sepashvili Trio; (Note: The Sepashvili Trio is a musical group consisting of members Guram Balarjishvili, Julieta Muradeli, and Eduard Sepashvili.) cover by Nino Chkheidze and Ursa Band
Guliko Tofchishvili (s2 ep. 1, winner)	"Santa Claus is Comin' to Town" — Christmas song; cover by Clayton-Hamilton Jazz Orchestra and Diana Krall
Giorgi Petriashvili (s2 ep. 10)	"Superstition" — Stevie Wonder
Mariam Levidze (s1 ep. 23, winner)	"Stars" (ვარსკვლავები) — Roma Rtskhiladze; cover by Maka Zambakhidze
Saba Bashiashvili (s1 ep. 28)	"Sweet Child o' Mine" — Guns N' Roses
Edward Arzumanov (s2 ep. 4, winner)	"La donna è mobile" — Opera song
Ani Bibiladze (s1 ep. 37)	"Imagine" — John Lennon
