= List of Gvachvene sheni khma episodes =

Television game show episode list

About the series
- Gvachvene sheni khma is a Georgian television mystery music game show broadcast by Rustavi 2, featuring its format based on the South Korean programme I Can See Your Voice.
- More about the series

Episodes overview
- Total episode(s): 75
- Aired episode(s): 73
- Special episode(s): 2

The Georgian television mystery music game show Gvachvene sheni khma (Georgian: გვაჩვენე შენი ხმა; transl. Show us your voice!) has played a total of two seasons and 75 episodes; broadcasting on Rustavi 2 from its pilot episode on 9 May 2023 (Note: Highlights: Giorgi Nazgaidze hosted the pilot episode while Tika Patsatsia did the entire 1st season.; The New Year's Eve singing contest (of its 1st season) in 2023 also include Janiko Izoria (ep. 15), who performed at the time of taping before his death 4 days later.; The New Year's All-Duet Game featured returning guest artists Dato Archvadze, Oto Nemsadze, Lasha Ramishvili, and Nodiko Tatishvili; as well as new players Nino Chkheidze and host Tika Patsatsia herself.; Seti (s2 ep. 22) designated as new players, which include members Eka Kandelaki, Sofo Maskhulia, and the returning Tika Patsatsia.) to 26 October 2025.

Throughout its broadcast, the Georgian adaptation played the first game featuring an entire lineup of mystery singers, with accompanied guest artists performing duets in-game. Aside from the main programme, a series of singing contests were held every last day of the year.

== Series overview ==
Series	Episodes	Originally released		Good singers	Bad singers
Series	Episodes	First released	Last released	Good singers	Bad singers
Pilot		9 May 2023		1	0
1	39	12 September 2023	16 July 2024	28	11
2	32	10 September 2024	26 October 2025	23	9
Sp	3	31 December 2023	31 December 2024	1	0

== Episodes ==
=== Pilot ===
Title	Guest artist(s)	Player order (Note: It refers to the guest artist(s) that have played in according to their first game; returning guest artists (which also include foreigners or former good singers, with their names displaying in italics) are not counted.)	Contestant(s)	Original release date
"Machvene sheni khma (Georgian: მაჩვენე შენი ხმა; transl. Show me your voice!)"	Zuka Khutsishvili	1	?	9 May 2023
Host: Giorgi Nazgaidze; Panelists: Tako Chorgolashvili, Paata Guliashvili, Kakha Mamulashvili, Archil Sologashvili, Giorgi Tsereteli, and Lela Tsurtsumia

=== Season 1 (2023–24) ===
List of season 1 episodes
No. overall	No. in season	Guest artist(s)	Player order	Contestant(s)	Original release date
2023
1	1	Lasha Ramishvili	2	Marina Bedoshvili	12 September 2023
2	2	Nodiko Tatishvili	3	Giviko Didia	19 September 2023
3	3	Oto Nemsadze	4	Nene Kurdadze and Nafota Giorgobiani	26 September 2023
4	4	Maka Zambakhidze	5	Kakhi Machavariani	3 October 2023
5	5	Salome Bakuradze	6	Otia Yoseliani	10 October 2023
6	6	Dato Porchkhidze	7	Ekaterine Tskhadadze	17 October 2023
7	7	Zura Manjavidze	8	Iliko Tshvediani and Miako Kvernadze	24 October 2023
8	8	Lasha Glonti	9	Hungrymen (Tornike and Guga Chkonievi)	31 October 2023
9	9	Dato Archvadze	10	Indira Ghomidze	7 November 2023
10	10	Dato Khujadze	11	Eka Chavleishvili	14 November 2023
11	11	Marita Rokhvadze	12	Giorgi Marchania	21 November 2023
12	12	Achiko Beridze	13	Zurab Rurua	28 November 2023
13	13	Tika Jamburia	14	Irma Khetsuriani	12 December 2023
14	14	Irma Sokhadze	15	Avimael Saavedra and Nino Cherkezishvili	19 December 2023
15	15	Sopo Bedia	16	Emili Family (Levan and Emilia Alimbarashvili)	26 December 2023
2024
16	16	Gigi Dedalamazishvili (Mgzavrebi)	19	Arians (Bella Burdzenidze and Mariam Gorgadze)	9 January 2024
17	17	Natia Todua	20	Yako Chagalanidze	16 January 2024
18	18	Nini Shermadini	21	Soso Nebieridze	23 January 2024
19	19	Nutsa Topuria	22	Muro Gagoshidze	30 January 2024
20	20	Indira Jgernaia	23	Arun Khatri	6 February 2024
21	21	Dodona Namoradze	24	Malkhaz Kvrivishvili and Khatuna Peikrishvili	13 February 2024
22	22	Mariam Shengelia	25	Amiran Babuadze and Irakli Kamkamidze	20 February 2024
23	23	Gela Donadze	26	Mariam and Tamuna Mdivani	27 February 2024
24	24	Lasha Nozadze (Reggaeon)	27	Keti Kantidze	5 March 2024
25	25	Elene Pochkhua	28	Davit Okropilashvili and Nino Kakauridze	12 March 2024
26	26	Datuna Mgeladze	29	Anatoli Boisa	19 March 2024
27	27	Giorgi Dzotsenidze	30	Elene Loladze	26 March 2024
28	28	Manana Todadze	31	Leila Legashvili and Ana Maisuradze	2 April 2024
29	29	Bari Chikhiashvili	32	Nutsa and Giorgi Gilgashvili	9 April 2024
30	30	Zuka Khutsishvili	—	Mariam Matiashvili and Elene Baramidze	23 April 2024
31	31	Datuna Sirbiladze	33	Giorgi Gocholeishvili	7 May 2024
32	32	Giorgi Nikoladze	34	Davit Lekashvili	21 May 2024
33	33	Barbara Samkharadze	35	Gvantsa Tsivilashvili	28 May 2024
34	34	Rati Durglishvili	36	Khatuna Nozadze	4 June 2024
35	35	Beso Kalandadze	37	Eka Mzhavanadze	11 June 2024
36	36	Nugzar Kvashali	38	Georgi Nemsadze	18 June 2024
37	37	Veriko Turashvili	39	Mariam Lamazi	25 June 2024
38	38	Dato Porchkhidze	—	Elene Tchalishvili-Visson	9 July 2024
39	39	Tika Makhaldiani	40	Giorgi Gvelesiani and Linda Kikolashvili	16 July 2024

=== Season 2 (2024–25) ===
List of season 2 episodes
No. overall	No. in season	Guest artist(s)	Player order	Contestant(s)	Original release date
2024
40	1	Irma Sokhadze	—	Levan Saginashvili and Irakli Zirakashvili	10 September 2024
41	2	Marita Rokhvadze	—	Svaneti Ranch Boys (Levan Maghradze and Davit Kvirikadze)	17 September 2024
42	3	Nutsa Buzaladze	41	RedBlack Dance Studio (Beka and Nika Nozadze)	25 September 2024
43	4	Nutsa Topuria	—	Sukhishvili Georgian National Ballet (Nino Jokhadze and Natia Bakuradze)	2 October 2024
44	5	Nino Chkheidze	—	Madonna Koidze and Liza Vadachkoria	9 October 2024
45	6	Ana Uznadze	42	Tatiana Kvekveskiri	16 October 2024
46	7	Poncho	43	Nino Lejava	23 October 2024
47	8	Nugzar Ergemlidze	44	Keti Chkheidze	30 October 2024
48	9	Tamara Gachechiladze	45	Giga Ochkhikidze	6 November 2024
49	10	Zura Manjavidze	—	Tamar Vashalomidze	13 November 2024
50	11	Giorgi Dzotsenidze	—	Nino Mumladze	20 November 2024
51	12	Lasha Ramishvili	—	Basa and Tamriko Potskishvili	27 November 2024
52	13	Nino Dzotsenidze	46	Davit Liklikadze	24 December 2024
2025
53	14	Tika Jamburia	—	Jano Izoria	7 January 2025
54	15	Veriko Turashvili	—	Ilia Sulamanidze and Oto Bazerashvili	14 January 2025
55	16	Gia Davitiani	47	Maka Dzagania and Giga Tsertsvadze	21 January 2025
56	17	Guram Lomidze	48	Avtandil	28 January 2025
57	18	Misho Javakhishvili	49	Erisioni (Giorgi Nozadze and Ani Dzeria)	4 February 2025
58	19	Oto Kovziridze	50	Ana Nozelidze	11 February 2025
59	20	Achiko Nizharadze	51	Manana Ramishvili	18 February 2025
60	21	Dato Kenchiashvili	52	Jaba Kiladze	25 February 2025
61	22	Indira Jgernaia	—	Seti	4 March 2025
62	23	Koba Chefkhodze	53	Tamar Adamia and Aleko Makharoblishvili	8 July 2025 (Note: This episode was originally scheduled to continue on 11 March 2025, only to be suddenly occupied by an 11th season of Georgia's Got Talent in its timeslot instead.)
63	24	Dato Archvadze	—	Roland Okropiridze	15 July 2025
64	25	Elene Pochkhua	—	Tako Abashidze	22 July 2025
65	26	Marita Rokhvadze	—	Asmat Tkabladze	7 September 2025
66	27	Ana Uznadze	—	Stella Koch and Aleqsi Kikvidze	14 September 2025
67	28	Lasha Glonti	—	Tedo Bekauri	21 September 2025
68	29	Dodona Namoradze	—	Nino Tarkhan-Mouravi and Temiko Chichinadze	28 September 2025
69	30	Manana Todadze	—	Khivcha Maghlakelidze and Mari Chakhvadze	12 October 2025
70	31	Oto Kovziridze	—	Vaska Grigarashvili	19 October 2025
71	32	Temo Rtskhiladze	54	Bedina	26 October 2025

== Specials ==
List of special episodes
No.	Title	Guest artist(s)	Player order	Original release date
1	"New Year's Eve Singing Contest — 2024 edition"	—	—	31 December 2023
Backstage host: Tako Chorgolashvili; Judges: Salome Bakuradze, Gigi Dedalamazishvili (Mgzavrebi), Paata Guliashvili, Avto Gvasalia, Rusa Marchiladze, Tamar Pkhakadze, and Nikoloz Rachveli
2	"New Year's All-Duet Game"	—	17–18	2 January 2024
3	"New Year's Eve Singing Contest — 2025 edition"	—	—	31 December 2024
Backstage host: Tako Chorgolashvili; Judges: Salome Bakuradze, Gigi Dedalamazishvili (Mgzavrebi), Oto Nemsadze, Tamar Pkhakadze, and Nato Metonidze
