= Gvachvene sheni khma season 1 =

Television game show season

Gvachvene sheni khma
- Season 1
- Starring: Salome Bakuradze; Gigi Dedalamazishvili (Mgzavrebi); Paata Guliashvili; Avto Gvasalia; Oto Nemsadze; Tamar Pkhakadze; Archil Sologashvili
- Hosted by: Main: Tika Patsatsia (Note: Season highlights: Giorgi Nazgaidze hosted the pilot episode while Tika Patsatsia did the rest of its season.; The New Year's Eve singing contest in 2023 also include Janiko Izoria (ep. 15), who performed at the time of taping before his death 4 days later.); Guest: Giorgi Nazgaidze
- Winners: Good singers: 30; Bad singers: 11
- No. of episodes: Regular: 39; Special: 3; Overall: 42

Release
- Original network: Rustavi 2
- Original release: Pilot episode: 9 May 2023; Season proper: 12 September 2023 – 16 July 2024

Season chronology
- Next → Season 2

The first season of the Georgian television mystery music game show Gvachvene sheni khma began airing on Rustavi 2 with a pilot episode on 9 May 2023, ahead of its proper season premiere on 12 September 2023.

== Gameplay ==
=== Format ===
According to the original South Korean rules, the guest artist(s) and contestant(s) must attempt to eliminate bad singers during its game phase. At the final performance, the last remaining mystery singer is revealed as either good or bad by means of a duet between them and one of the guest artists. (Note: Gameplay notes: The number of rounds are set to three (for the rest of the season) or four (for the pilot episode).; The number of contestants are set to one or a pair.)

If the last remaining mystery singer is good, the contestant(s) win(s) ₾3,000; this is also applied to the winning bad singer selected by them.

=== Rounds ===
1. First impression (Georgian: Პირველი შთაბეჭდილება) (pilot episode)
  The guest artist and contestant(s) are given some time to observe and examine each mystery singer based on their appearance.
2. Phonogram (Georgian: ფონოგრამა)
  - Pilot episode: Each mystery singer performs a lip sync to a song; good singers mime to a recording of their own, while bad singers mime to a backing track by another vocalist.
  - Rest of the season: Six mystery singers are divided into pairs, in which each compete a lip sync battle against each other.
3. Broken phone (Georgian: გატეხილი ტელეფონი)
  The guest artist and contestant(s) are presented with a video package containing possible clues by one of the mystery singers of their choice.
4. Interrogation (Georgian: დაკითხვა)
  The guest artist and contestant(s) may ask questions to the remaining mystery singers. Good singers are required to give truthful responses, while the bad singers must lie.

== Episodes ==
=== Guest artists ===
| Legend: |
Good singer
Bad singer
— The contestant(s) won the money.
— The winning bad singer stole the money.

2023 games
| Episode | | Guest artist (Note: Players' notes: For the returning guest artists (who also include foreigners and former good singers), names are displayed in italics.; For the mixed groups, names who identified as bad singers are displayed in italics.) | Contestant(s) | Mystery singers (In their respective numbers and aliases) | | | | | |
| # | Date | Guest artist | Contestant(s) | Elimination order | | | | | Winner |
| # | Date | Guest artist | Contestant(s) | Phonogram | | | Broken phone | Interrogation | Winner |
|---|---|---|---|---|---|---|---|---|---|
| Pilot | 9 May 2023 | Zuka Khutsishvili | ? → | 1. Mikheil Toriashvili; (Fashion Designer) | 4. Tako Gagnidze; (Student) | 2. Nikoloz Jakhaia; (Photo Model) | 3. Nodar Gochoshvili; (Rockstar) | 6. Mariam Chukhrikidze; (Actress) | 5. ?; Housewife |
| 1 | 12 September 2023 | Lasha Ramishvili | Marina Bedoshvili → ₾3,000 | 6. Muhammed Khankishiev; (Dentist) | 5. Nemo Jalaghonia; (Woodworker) | 1. Mellor Jorjoliani; (Ballet Dancer) | 3. Lika Gotsiridze; (Nanny) | 2. Dachi Bardzimadze; (Surrealist Painter) | 4. Mariam Khurodze; Sewing Atelier Manager |
| 2 | 19 September 2023 | Nodiko Tatishvili | Giviko Didia → ₾3,000 | 1. Davit Meskhidze; (Lifeguard) | 3. Sandro Lashkhi; (Architect) | 5. Tina Inanidze; (Sommelier) | 4. Kakha Janashia; (Cardiologist) | 6. Memo Nivano; (Linguist) | 2. Sofo Buturishvili; Kickboxer |
| 3 | 26 September 2023 | Oto Nemsadze | Nene Kurdadze and Nafota Giorgobiani → ₾0 | 3. Manana Alania; (Yoga Instructor) | 4. Tsitsino Ediberidze; (Reporter) | 6. Luka Murusidze; (Actor) | 2. Zura Begiashvili; (Choreographer) | 1. Ramaz Bayramov; (Hip-hop Dancer) | 5. Katia Kartskhia; Lawyer |
| 4 | 3 October 2023 | Maka Zambakhidze | Kakhi Machavariani → ₾3,000 | 4. Nino Shavdia; (Kobido Specialist) | 6. Tornike Asanidze; (Vocal Teacher) | 3. Lano Tsurtsumia; (Stylist) | 1. Giorgi Biashvili; (Cooking Competition Champion) | 2. Teona Dadeshkeliani; (Bodybuilder) | 5. Nino Davitiani; Karaoke Club Manager |
| 5 | 10 October 2023 | Salome Bakuradze | Otia Yoseliani → ₾3,000 | 4. Guranda Lazarashvili; (Esotericist) | 3. Lalu Zamukashvili; (Jewelry Designer) | 2. Martha Chokheli; (Barista) | 5. Nika Kokaya; (Photo Model) | 1. Givi Kusikashvili; (Puppeteer) | 6. Malkhaz Gabisonia; English Language Teacher |
| 6 | 17 October 2023 | Dato Porchkhidze | Ekaterine Tskhadadze → ₾0 | 6. Luda Dundua; (Single Mom) | 1. Mariam Giorgishvili; (Mkhedruli Dancer) | 3. Tsitsi Chkheidze; (Photographer) | 4. Pavle Revazishvili; (Mexican Hotdog Vendor) | 2. Nino Mefarishvili; (Businesswoman) | 5. William Bochorishvili; Model |
| 7 | 24 October 2023 | Zura Manjavidze | Iliko Tshvediani and Miako Kvernadze → ₾0 | 2. Mako Khvedelidze; (Bodypainter) | 3. Luka Kokhreidze; (Runway Coach) | 1. Giorgi Tkebuchava; (Events Host) | 5. Giorgi Barbakadze; (Digital Marketer) | 4. Valeria Leladze; (Artist-Decorator) | 6. Khareba Dartsimelia-Chochia; Sound Director |
| 8 | 31 October 2023 | Lasha Glonti | Hungrymen (Tornike and Guga Chkonievi) → ₾0 | 1. Saba Mikeladze; (Pianist) | 2. Shoka Jichia; (Mentalist) | 6. Kakhaber Sikturashvili; (Mechanical Engineer) | 5. Nika Falavandishvili; (Online Shop Owner) | 4. Kristine Kapanadze; (Bollywood Dancer) | 3. Amiran Alania; Merchandiser |
| 9 | 7 November 2023 | Dato Archvadze | Indira Ghomidze → ₾3,000 | 6. Badri Nikoladze; (School Security Guard) | 2. Irakli Kamkamidze; (Athlete) | 4. Zura Kirvalidze; (Strip Club Performer) | 1. Keti Mukhadze; (Chacha Dancer) | 3. Ekaterine Anjaparidze; (Historian) | 5. Nene Sikharulidze; American Scholar |
| 10 | 14 November 2023 | Dato Khujadze | Eka Chavleishvili → ₾0 | 2. Nini Kulejishvili; (Ballroom Dancer) | 6. Anna Mamaiashvili; (Documentary Filmmaker) | 4. Liza Daraselia; (Psychologist) | 3. Vasiko Sanikidze; (Fastfood Manager) | 5. Anzor Valetov; (Portrait Artist) | 1. Vako Taktakishvili; Acrobat |
| 11 | 21 November 2023 | Marita Rokhvadze | Giorgi Marchania → ₾3,000 | 1. Irma Jangirashvili; (Poetess) | 3. Levan Todua; (Security Expert) | 6. Mariam Goletani; (Tennis Player) | 4. Lika Osianikova; (Promo Girl) | 5. Sofo Erkomaishvili; (Housewife) | 2. Anuki Dvali; Insurance Mentor |
| 12 | 28 November 2023 | Achiko Beridze | Zurab Rurua → ₾3,000 | 4. Frederick Melvin; (Footballer) | 1. Gigi Tsanava; (Boxer) | 3. Irakli Kvernadze; (Pillar of the Home) | 2. Liliana Tuskia; (Ballerina) | 5. Lika Nutsubidze; (Copywriter) | 6. Temo Apakidze; Hunter |
| 13 | 12 December 2023 | Tika Jamburia | Irma Khetsuriani → ₾3,000 | 1. Nikusha Lachashvili; (Rugby Player) | 4. Ramaz Garshaulashvili; (Fakir) | 5. Saba Abramishvili; (Karateka) | 3. Lika Kirkitadze; (Zumba Instructor) | 2. Natia Gabadze; (Sukhishvili Dancer) | 6. Irma Shoshitashvili; Piano Arranger |
| 14 | 19 December 2023 | Irma Sokhadze | Avimael Saavedra and Nino Cherkezishvili → ₾3,000 | 3. Alex Merck; (Goalkeeper) | 4. Eva Shanava; (Brand Manager) | 6. Nikoloz Agladze; (Drummer) | 1. DJ Rango; (Clubber) | 5. Tamar Bokoveli; (Linguist) | 2. Bagrat Guliashvili; Composer |
| 15 | 26 December 2023 | Sopo Bedia | Emili Family (Levan and Emilia Alimbarashvili) → ₾3,000 | 1. Janiko Izoria; (Comedian) | 6. Sandro Charelashvili; (Cosplayer) | 3. Beka Shubladze; (OB Camera Operator) | 4. Ani Shaishmelashvili; (Figure Skater) | 2. Tamari Kalandadze; (Top Model of the World) | 5. Shizi Tshinedo; Billiards Player |

2024 games
| Episode | | Guest artist | Contestant(s) | Mystery singers (In their respective numbers and aliases) | | | | | |
| # | Date | Guest artist | Contestant(s) | Elimination order | | | | | Winner |
| # | Date | Guest artist | Contestant(s) | Phonogram | | | Broken phone | Interrogation | Winner |
|---|---|---|---|---|---|---|---|---|---|
| Special | 2 January 2024 | New Year's All-Duet Game; Featuring an entire lineup of mystery singers with designated guest artists; the winning pair wins ₾3,000. | | 2. Tika Patsatsia and Avtandil Bagrationi; (Skater) | 1. Lasha Ramishvili and Riddhi Adhyaru; (Medical University Student) | 5. Nodiko Tatishvili and Eleni Mushkudian; (Sagittarius) | 6. Nino Chkheidze and Giorgi Zoidze; (Pantomime Actor) | 4. Dato Archvadze and Mikheil Mumladze; (Busker) | 3. Oto Nemsadze and Nene Nikabadze; Photographer |
| 16 | 9 January 2024 | Gigi Dedalamazishvili (Mgzavrebi) | Arians (Bella Burdzenidze and Mariam Gorgadze) → ₾3,000 | 2. Ancho Aslanoglu; (Bouzouki Singer) | 1. Beka Metreveli; (Party Centre Manager) | 6. Tamara Khorava; (Fast Food Consultant) | 5. Maggie Asloeva; (Kurdish Linguist) | 4. Filippo Marengo; (Tenor) | 3. Giorgi Bedinadze; Doctor |
| 17 | 16 January 2024 | Natia Todua | Yako Chagalanidze → ₾0 | 4. Yusef Hiri; (Dog Walker) | 2. Davit Kurdovanidze; (Judoka) | 3. Londa Makhinashvili; (Beatboxer) | 5. Anna Khutsishvili; (Inventor) | 6. Nina Jagiashvili; (Numismatist) | 1. Levan Kandashvili; Guitarist |
| 18 | 23 January 2024 | Nini Shermadini | Soso Nebieridze → ₾3,000 | 5. Giorgi Mchedlishvili; (Fortune Teller) | 6. Emzar Khuchua; (Fire Dancer) | 2. Tika Siradze; (Croupier) | 4. Irma Mefarishvili; (Usher) | 3. Otto Faliani; (Vinyl Collector) | 1. Giorgi Kordadze; Masseur |
| 19 | 30 January 2024 | Nutsa Topuria | Muro Gagoshidze → ₾3,000 | 6. Yuri Gachechiladze; (Clown) | 1. Haruka Fukushima; (Japanese Calligrapher) | 5. Lika Silagava; (Marilyn Monroe Impersonator) | 3. Khatia Chitanava; (Laboratory Technician) | 2. Anastasia Vashakmadze; (Busker) | 4. Anna Urotadze; MIS Specialist |
| 20 | 6 February 2024 | Indira Jgernaia | Arun Khatri → ₾3,000 | 4. Guri Chelidze; (Sommelier) | 2. Nukri Stefanov; (Taxi Driver) | 1. Nata Gajishvili; (Hairdresser) | 5. Khatia Khvardzikia; (Wushu Practitioner) | 3. Mariam Gabunia; (Jockey) | 6. Luka Obgadze; Real Estate Agent |
| 21 | 13 February 2024 | Dodona Namoradze | Malkhaz Kvrivishvili and Khatuna Peikrishvili → ₾3,000 | 1. Lizi Margiani; (Mestia Actor) | 3. Saba Mikaberidze; (Drift Racer) | 4. Davit Katsadze; (Engineer) | 6. Shako Gordulava; (Assistant Plastic Surgeon) | 5. Nini Chikhladze; (Confectioner) | 2. Elene Makharadze; Flamenco Dance Instructor |
| 22 | 20 February 2024 | Mariam Shengelia | Amiran Babuadze and Irakli Kamkamidze → ₾3,000 | 6. Beka Bolkvadze; (Bouncer) | 3. Confidence; (Swimmer) | 1. Giorgi Chikvaidze; (Conservatory Entrant) | 2. Mariam Keshelava; (Graphic Designer) | 4. Gvantsa Tsivilashvili; (Florist) | 5. Nutsa Mirzashvili; Lounge Singer |
| 23 | 27 February 2024 | Gela Donadze | Mariam and Tamuna Mdivani → ₾3,000 | 2. Ani Lomidze; (Loves) | 4. Tamar Khvedelidze; (French Restaurant Manager) | 5. Irakli Gugushvili; (Painter) | 1. Tsotne Nadirashvili; (Winemaker) | 3. Tornike Tamazashvili; (Tamtam Drummer) | 6. Mariam Levidze; Lawyer |
| 24 | 5 March 2024 | Lasha Nozadze (Reggaeon) | Keti Kantidze → ₾0 | 6. Lika Tabatadze; (Stewardess) | 4. Nini Sutishvili; (Hip-hop Dancer) | 1. Nino Dilebashvili; (Bus Driver) | 5. Niko Sokhadze; (Ambulance Assistant) | 2. Levan Cherkezia; (Outpatient) | 3. Vepkhvia Gorgodze; Retired Soldier |
| 25 | 12 March 2024 | Elene Pochkhua | Davit Okropilashvili and Nino Kakauridze → ₾3,000 | 6. Zaza Mamaladze; (Beekeeper) | 2. Temur Khutsishvili; (Director) | 1. Beka Chialashvili; (Chokhosan Performer) | 5. Irakli Khosroshvili; (Social Worker) | 3. Lizi Margiani; (Economic Adviser) | 4. Nini Totadze; Violinist |
| 26 | 19 March 2024 | Datuna Mgeladze | Anatoli Boisa → ₾3,000 | 6. Nino Lomidze; (Make-up Artist) | 3. Ruska Tatanashvili; (Nutritional Consultant) | 1. Elizbar Tsersezovi; (Tattoo Artist) | 5. Mia Tavdigridze; (Hair Braider) | 2. Natia Peradze; (Philology Student) | 4. Vakhtang Ivanelashvili; Purchasing Director |
| 27 | 26 March 2024 | Giorgi Dzotsenidze | Elene Loladze → ₾3,000 | 5. Ana Yamanidze; (Startup Businesswoman) | 3. Davit Drezheshvili; (Flight Attendant) | 4. Nikoloz Kardava; (Chef) | 2. Nita Maisuradze; (Barbie Fan) | 1. Luka Okujava; (Bar Singer) | 6. Teona Jgernaia; Art Teacher |
| 28 | 2 April 2024 | Manana Todadze | Leila Legashvili and Ana Maisuradze → ₾3,000 | 5. Saba Basiashvili; (Rugby Player) | 6. Keta Trapaidze; (Belly Dancer) | 4. Nani Tsaliradze; (Croupier) | 1. Nika Parapetiani; (Soldier) | 3. Tato Kashakashvili; (Mister Georgia) | 2. Tamta Kakulia; Chief Human Resources Officer |
| 29 | 9 April 2024 | Bari Chikhiashvili | Nutsa and Giorgi Gilgashvili → ₾0 | 2. Nene Kldiashvili; (Florist) | 4. Manzo Gulbiani; (Punk Rocker) | 5. Shmebro Mghebrishvili; (Illustrator) | 6. Mariam Egadze; (Trampoline Jumper) | 1. Ana Abzianidze; (Record Producer) | 3. Nikoloz Kacharava; Baker |
| 30 | 23 April 2024 | Zuka Khutsishvili | Mariam Matiashvili and Elene Baramidze → ₾3,000 | 1. Sandro Jikia; (Kartuli Performer) | 2. Beka Mariamuli; (Ukulele Teacher) | 4. Lali Natenadze; (Songbird) | 5. Nini Shvelidze; (Radio DJ) | 6. Apollon Lotuashvili; (Delivery Rider) | 3. Tamta Khositashvili; Babysitter |
| 31 | 7 May 2024 | Datuna Sirbiladze | Giorgi Gocholeishvili → ₾3,000 | 1. Lado Mgeladze; (Musical Trio Member) | 2. Maya Janjghava; (Cinderella) | 6. Ninutza Khidasheli; (Bride) | 3. Lia Euashvili; (Tailor) | 4. Eto Kapanadze; (Camp Counselor) | 5. Lasha Datuashvili; Boxer |
| 32 | 21 May 2024 | Giorgi Nikoladze | Davit Lekashvili → ₾3,000 | 1. Shavleg Gudadze; (Organ Grinder) | 2. Keti Kavtaradze; (Housekeeper) | 5. Lisi Ambukadze; (Ballet Dancer) | 4. Saba Gventsadze; (Fashion Blogger) | 6. Nodo Makharashvili; (Actor) | 3. Matsatso Mtivlishvili; Maid |
| 33 | 28 May 2024 | Barbara Samkharadze | Gvantsa Tsivilashvili → ₾3,000 | 5. Mariam Kakhidze; (Comedian) | 2. Saba Shelia; (Pizzeria Employee) | 1. Elene Gigineishvili; (Soul Performer) | 3. Levan Rostomauli; (Sound Operator) | 6. Merab Lataria; (Auto Mechanic) | 4. Nini Malkhazishvili; Reporter |
| 34 | 4 June 2024 | Rati Durglishvili | Khatuna Nozadze → ₾0 | 5. Keti Glonti; (Skateboarder) | 2. Jeni Pertaia; (Karaoke Queen) | 3. Elena Nadiradze; (Online Antique Seller) | 6. David Gorgadze; (Restaurant Singer) | 1. Giorgi Mskhviladze; (Stuntman) | 4. Lado Gergedava; Cinematographer |
| 35 | 11 June 2024 | Beso Kalandadze | Eka Mzhavanadze → ₾0 | 3. Tornike Khetsadze; (Street Acrobat) | 4. Liza Omiadze; (Gymnast) | 2. Davit Toloraia; (Masseur) | 6. Lasha Patashuri; (Magician) | 1. Salome Khaniashvili; (Farmer) | 5. Inga Gurgenadze; Herbalist |
| 36 | 18 June 2024 | Nugzar Kvashali | Georgi Nemsadze → ₾3,000 | 6. Nino Kotashvili; (Cosplay Princess) | 5. Giorgi Bezhanishvili; (Promodiser) | 2. Davit Khurtsilava; (Mkhedruli Dancer) | 3. Tinatin Kharshiladze; (French Songstress) | 1. Nodo Ordinidze; (Metallurgical Factory Worker) | 4. Lizi Motskhobili; Hotel Administrator |
| 37 | 25 June 2024 | Veriko Turashvili | Mariam Lamazi → ₾0 | 6. Marso Furtseladze; (Economist) | 1. Dzeko Rustamov; (Barbershop Owner) | 5. Guram Obolashvili; (Football Steward) | 4. Saba Sartania; (Cotton Candy Vendor) | 2. Ani Bibiladze; (Conductor) | 3. Mariam Beriashvili; Food Critic |
| 38 | 9 July 2024 | Dato Porchkhidze | Elene Tchalishvili-Visson → ₾3,000 | 1. Mariam Gorgadze; (Maghrul Singer) | 5. Davit Gegiadze; (Extreme Sports Podcaster) | 6. Nika and Mariam Sidamonidze; (Country Music Duo) | 4. Teia Kashakashvili; (Cosmetic Consultant) | 3. Mikheil Chumburidze; (Painter) | 2. Sofo Amirejibi; Gardener |
| 39 | 16 July 2024 | Tika Makhaldiani | Giorgi Gvelesiani and Linda Kikolashvili → ₾3,000 | 3. Goga Svianadze; (Billiards Player) | 4. Nina Gorgaslidze; (Bartender) | 5. Tornike Imerlishvili; (Surveyor) | 1. Mariam Alimbarashvili; (Nightclub DJ) | 6. Suliko Baramidze; (Film Setter) | 2. Ana Akhobadze; Nanny Vlogger |

=== Panelists ===
| Legend: |
Regular panelist
Additional panelist
Guest panelist

| Apps | | Panelists in attendance (Sorted by first appearance, with episode designations) |
| g# | p# | Panelists in attendance (Sorted by first appearance, with episode designations) |
|---|---|---|
| 40 | 1 | Tamar Pkhakadze (1–39; sp. 1) |
| 34 | 1 | Gigi Dedalamazishvili (Mgzavrebi) (1–6, 8–15, 18, 22–39; sp. 1) |
| 27 | 1 | Salome Bakuradze (7, 14–17, 19–39; sp. 1) |
| 23 | 1 | Oto Nemsadze (13, 17–27, 29–39) |
| 22 | 1 | Archil Sologashvili (pilot, 17, 19–24, 26–39) |
| 17 | 1 | Avto Gvasalia (1–16; sp. 1) |
| 14 | 1 | Paata Guliashvili (pilot, 1–9, 13, 16, 18; sp. 1) |
| 2 | 4 | Zaza Shengelia (7, 9); Zura Manjavidze (10, 17); Andria Gvelesiani (11, 12); Avtandil (15, 19) |
| 1 | 14 | Tako Chorgolashvili, Kakha Mamulashvili, Giorgi Tsereteli, and Lela Tsurtsumia (pilot); Stephane Mgebrishvili (8); Tinatin Tsuladze (10); Yasha Gurgenidze (11); Natalia Kipshidze (12); Mikheil Tsagareli (16); Marina Karpiy (Note: Panelists' note: Foreign attendee: Marina Karpiy (UKR)) (18); Sopo Bedia (20); Lasha Ramishvili (21); Nodiko Tatishvili (25); Marita Rokhvadze (28) |

== New Year's Eve Singing Contest (31 December 2023) ==
Also in this season, a first singing contest was held in the last day of 2023, featuring some of invited mystery singers return to perform, with the winner receiving ₾10,000.

Legend:
Winner

Gvachvene sheni khma season 1 — New Year's Eve singing contest performances
Backstage host: Tako Chorgolashvili; Judges: Salome Bakuradze, Gigi Dedalamazishvili (Mgzavrebi), Paata Guliashvili, Avto Gvasalia, Rusa Marchiladze, Tamar Pkhakadze, and Nikoloz Rachveli
| Performer(s) | Song(s) |
| Janiko Izoria (ep. 15) | "Volare" — Gipsy Kings |
| Temo Apakidze (ep. 12, winner) | "We Are the Champions" — Queen |
| Nini Kulejishvili (ep. 10) | "Tulip" (ლალე) — Lizi Gozalishvili |
| Liza Daraselia (ep. 10) | "It Explodes" (ფეთქავს) — Magda Ivanishvili |
| Gigi Tsanava (ep. 12) | "Sixteen Tons" — Merle Travis; cover by Geoff Castellucci |
| Kakhaber Sikturashvili (ep. 8) | "I Sing to You, My City of Tbilisi" (შენ გიმღერი ჩემო თბილის ქალაქო) — Zurab Anjaparidze |
| Nemo Jalaghonia (ep. 1) | "A Little Less Conversation" — Elvis Presley |
| Luda Dundua (ep. 6) | "'O sole mio" — Italian folk song |
| Sandro Lashkhi (ep. 2) | "Chessboard" (ჭადრაკის დაფა) — Roma Rtskhiladze |
| Tornike Asanidze (ep. 4) | "Stay with Me" — Sam Smith |
| Nene Sikharulidze (ep. 9, winner) | "All I Want for Christmas Is You" — Mariah Carey |
| Saba Mikeladze (ep. 8) | "Cry Me a River" — Michael Bublé |
