= Gvachvene sheni khma =

Georgian television game show

- Georgian: გვაჩვენე შენი ხმა
- Literally: Show us your voice!
- Genre: Game show
- Based on: I Can See Your Voice by CJ ENM
- Directed by: Nika Enukidze
- Creative director: Tamar Gomarteli
- Presented by: Tika Patsatsia
- Starring: The celebrity panelists (see cast)
- Country of origin: Georgia
- Original language: Georgian
- No. of seasons: 2
- No. of episodes: Regular: 72: Special: 3; Overall: 75

Production
- Executive producers: Telia Japaridze; Giorgi Khaburzania
- Producers: Tamar Bochorishvili; Natia Dedanashvili
- Camera setup: Multi-camera

Original release
- Network: Rustavi 2
- Release: 9 May 2023 – 26 October 2025

Related
- I Can See Your Voice franchise; Imghere

Gvachvene sheni khma (Georgian: გვაჩვენე შენი ხმა) is a Georgian television mystery music game show based on the South Korean programme I Can See Your Voice, featuring its format where guest artist(s) and contestant(s) attempt to eliminate bad singers from the group, until the last mystery singer remains for a duet performance. It first aired on Rustavi 2 on 9 May 2023.

== Gameplay ==
=== Format ===
Over the course of several rounds, the guest artist(s) and contestant(s) must attempt to eliminate bad singers from a group of six "mystery singers", identified only by their occupation or alias, without ever hearing them perform live. They are assisted by clues regarding the singers' backgrounds, style of performance, and observations from a celebrity panel. At the end of a game, the last remaining mystery singer is revealed as either good or bad by means of a duet between them and one of the guest artists. (Note: Gameplay notes: The number of rounds are set to three (from 1st to 2nd season) or four (for the pilot episode).; The number of contestants are set to one or a pair.)

If the last remaining mystery singer is good, the contestant(s) win(s) ₾3,000; this is also applied to the winning bad singer selected by them.

=== Rounds ===
==== Visual round ====
- First impression (Georgian: Პირველი შთაბეჭდილება)

s1 pilot: The guest artist and contestant(s) are given some time to observe and examine each mystery singer based on their appearance.

==== Lip sync round ====
- Phonogram (Georgian: ფონოგრამა)
  - s1 pilot: Each mystery singer performs a lip sync to a song; good singers mime to a recording of their own, while bad singers mime to a backing track by another vocalist.
  - s1–2: Six mystery singers are divided into pairs, in which each compete a lip sync battle against each other.

==== Evidence round ====
- Broken phone (Georgian: გატეხილი ტელეფონი)

s1–2: The guest artist and contestant(s) are presented with a video package containing possible clues by one of the mystery singers of their choice.

==== Interrogation round ====
- Interrogation (Georgian: დაკითხვა)

s1–2: The guest artist and contestant(s) may ask questions to the remaining mystery singers. Good singers are required to give truthful responses, while the bad singers must lie.

== Production ==
iMBC eNews provisionally announced a Georgian adaptation of I Can See Your Voice in a lead-up to the (South Korean) tenth season of the same title in February 2023; this was subsequently confirmed by Rustavi 2 Broadcasting Company in September 2023.

== Broadcast history ==
Gvachvene sheni khma debuted as a pilot episode under its original title Machvene sheni khma (Georgian: მაჩვენე შენი ხმა; transl. Show me your voice!) on 9 May 2023, ahead of the first season premiere on 12 September 2023. Also, a New Year's All-Duet Game was played on 2 January 2024, featuring an entire lineup of mystery singers with designated guest artists performing duets in-game. (Note: Highlights: Giorgi Nazgaidze hosted the pilot episode while Tika Patsatsia did the entire 1st season.; The New Year's Eve singing contest (of its 1st season) in 2023 also include Janiko Izoria (ep. 15), who performed at the time of taping before his death 4 days later.; The New Year's All-Duet Game featured returning guest artists Dato Archvadze, Oto Nemsadze, Lasha Ramishvili, and Nodiko Tatishvili; as well as new players Nino Chkheidze and host Tika Patsatsia herself.)

Three weeks after first season finale, Rustavi 2 renewed the series for a second season, which premiered on 10 September 2024. An episode featuring guest artist Koba Chefkhodze that originally scheduled to continue on 11 March 2025, was suddenly occupied by an 11th season of Georgia's Got Talent in its timeslot instead; this was later pushed back to resume airing on 8 July 2025, one week after finale of The Voice of Georgia. (Note: The Voice of Georgia (Georgian: საქართველოს ხმი, romanized: Saqartvelos khma) is a reality singing competition programme unrelated to The Voice franchise and its own counterpart.)

For two seasons, a series of singing contests were held every last day of the year, featuring some of invited mystery singers return to perform, with the winner receiving ₾10,000.

== Cast ==
The series employs a panel of celebrity "detectives" who assist the guest artists and contestants in identifying good and bad mystery singers throughout the game. Along with regular members, guest panelists also appear since the first season. Overall, seven celebrities have served as panelists, with their original lineup consisting of Gigi Dedalamazishvili (Mgzavrebi), Paata Guliashvili, Avto Gvasalia, and Tamar Pkhakadze. Later members who joined the group's duties also include Archil Sologashvili from the pilot episode; Salome Bakuradze and Oto Nemsadze — from the 1st season.

Designations:
Main cast member	H Hosting duties
Additional cast member	g# Total games attended, by panelists

Cast member	Seasons	
Cast member	1	2
Tika Patsatsia	H	H
Salome Bakuradze	27	29
Gigi Dedalamazishvili (Mgzavrebi)	34	13
Paata Guliashvili	14	
Avto Gvasalia	17	
Oto Nemsadze	23	28
Tamar Pkhakadze	40	32
Archil Sologashvili	22	32

== Series overview ==
Series	Episodes	Originally released		Good singers	Bad singers
Series	Episodes	First released	Last released	Good singers	Bad singers
Pilot		9 May 2023		1	0
1	39	12 September 2023	16 July 2024	28	11
2	32	10 September 2024	26 October 2025	23	9
Sp	3	31 December 2023	31 December 2024	1	0
