= Imghere =

Georgian television game show

- Georgian: იმღერე
- Literally: Sing it
- Genre: Game show
- Based on: I Can See Your Voice (original South Korean programme and format); Gvachvene sheni khma (original Georgian adaptation); Giọng ải giọng ai (Vietnamese adaptation and battle format)
- Presented by: Tika Patsatsia
- Starring: Salome Bakuradze; Tamar Pkhakadze; Archil Sologashvili
- Country of origin: Georgia
- Original language: Georgian
- No. of episodes: 11

Production
- Camera setup: Multi-camera

Original release
- Network: Rustavi 2
- Release: 11 September 2026 – present

Related
- I Can See Your Voice franchise

Imghere (Georgian: იმღერე) is a Georgian television mystery music game show, featuring its format where a team of guest artists attempt to identify good and bad singers through batches of mystery singers. It premiered on Rustavi 2 on 11 September 2026.

The series is a continuation of Gvachvene sheni khma, which aired for two seasons from 2023 to 2025. Implementing on the "invasion format" (a variation of the "battle format" that resembles from Giọng ải giọng ai, and was first used on Catch Me If You Can — the unofficial adaptation of Ya vizhu tvoy golos), the series has applied the same designation as Russia that also technically included to the I Can See Your Voice franchise.

== Gameplay ==
The game features two opposing teams — a team of five guest artists (known as "stars") and a team of mystery singers performing in batches (known as "invaders"). (Note: Gameplay notes: The number of mystery singers are set to eight or nine (for the tiebreaker batch).; Also, an "invader" can perform freely without accompanying guest artist(s) for a duet; these were introduced in the original South Korean 8th and 10th seasons.)

Each mystery singer performs a lip sync to a song; good singers mime to a recording of their own, while bad singers mime to a backing track by another vocalist. After the "stage of truth" performances, they are now allowed to talk freely.

If the guest artists guessed the mystery singer right, they get points depending on batch, otherwise the mystery singers did the same points have if they guessed wrong.

1. Solo batches (1 pt)
  Each mystery singer individually performs a lip sync. At the end of each round, the guest artists are deliberated to predict whether a mystery singer is good or bad.
2. Showdown batches
  A pair of mystery singers compete a lip sync battle against each other; the first two batches are donning in their "work attires" (worth 2 pts), while the third are impersonating by a designated artist (worth 6 pts). Afterward, the guest artists are deliberated to predict which one of the mystery singers in a single batch is bad.
3. Tiebreaker batch (1 pt)
  If the score between two opposing teams end up in a tie after five batches, an additional mystery singer performs a lip sync, with guest artists did the same mechanic as solo phase.

At the end of the game, the team having scored the most points wins ₾3,000.

== Production ==
Following the provisional announcement for the Georgian adaptation of I Can See Your Voice by iMBC eNews in a lead-up to the (South Korean) tenth season of the same title in February 2023, Rustavi 2 formally acquired the rights to produce Gvachvene sheni khma (Georgian: გვაჩვენე შენი ხმა; transl. Show us your voice!), which began as a pilot episode under its original title Machvene sheni khma (Georgian: მაჩვენე შენი ხმა; transl. Show me your voice!) on 9 May 2023, and ahead of the proper first season premiere on 12 September 2023. On 17 July 2026, a post from Gvachvene sheni khma's official Facebook page had announced the auditions for a supposedly third season; but two weeks later, the series suddenly renamed to Imghere.

Filming of the show took place at an undisclosed location in Tbilisi, and began in September 2026.

== Episodes ==
=== Players ===
Apps		★ Stars in attendance (Guest artists; sorted by first appearance, with episode designations) (Note: Players' note: For the returning guest artists (who also include foreigners and former good singers), names are displayed in italics.)
g#	p#	★ Stars in attendance (Guest artists; sorted by first appearance, with episode designations)
10	3	Salome Bakuradze, (Note: Highlights: Crossovers from Gvachvene sheni khma: s1: Zuka Khutsishvili, Salome Bakuradze, Nino Chkheidze, Gela Donadze, Giorgi Dzotsenidze, Tika Jamburia, Tika Makhaldiani, Zura Manjavidze, Dodona Namoradze, and Dato Porchkhidze; s2: Archil Sologashvili) Tamar Pkhakadze, and Archil Sologashvili (1–10)
3	1	Nino Chkheidze (1, 5, 10)
2	1	Avtandil (1–2)
1	15	Dato Porchkidze (2); Nini Karseladze and Zura Khachidze (3); Gela Donadze and Dodona Namoradze (4); Jaba Kiladze (5); Tika Jamburia and Tika Makhaldiani (6); Bachana Janturia and Keti Salakaia (7); Nika Arabidze and Giorgi Dzotsenidze (8); Guga Guliashvili and Zura Manjavidze (9); Zuka Khutsishvili (10)

=== Games ===
Legend:
★ — The "stars" scored point(s).	— The "stars" guessed the mystery singer right.
✱ — The "invaders" scored point(s).	— The "stars" guessed the mystery singer wrong.

Episode		Score		✱ Invaders (Mystery singers; also including opponents' guesses in their respective numbers)				
#	Date	★ Stars	✱ Invaders	Solos	Showdown #1	Showdown #2	Showdown #3	Tiebreaker
1	11 September 2026	2	10 ₾3,000	1. Vasha Mameishvili → ✱ +1; 2. Mariam Nibliashvili → ✱ +1	→ ★ +2: 3. Mariam Patarashvili; 4. Giorgi Shermadini	→ ✱ +2: 5. Tatia Merkviladze; 6. Nini Pirtakhia	Vakhtang Kikabidze → ✱ +6: 7. Maksime Japaridze; 8. Temo Mamijanashvili	×
2	18 September 2026	7 ₾3,000	5	1. Marta Tsikladze → ★ +1; 2. Luka Siskhadze → ✱ +1	→ ✱ +2: 3. Nutsa Khujadze; 4. Lasha Sarishvili	→ ✱ +2: 5. Anano Tsava; 6. Giorgi Aznauri	Giuli Chokheli → ★ +6: 7. Tamar Bochorishvili; 8. Mariam Tinikashvili	×
3	25 September 2026	0	12 ₾3,000	1. Alex Aleksanian → ✱ +1; 2. Tsira Tsimintia → ✱ +1	→ ✱ +2: 3. Nikoloz Revanishvili; 4. Likuna Batiashvili	→ ✱ +2: 5. Lasha Rikadze; 6. Nini Lephsaia	Sofiko Chiaureli → ✱ +6: 7. Nino Kukania; 8. Mariam Razmadze	×
4	2 October 2026	1	11 ₾3,000	1. Nikoloz Donadze → ✱ +1; 2. Mavra Kardenakhishvili → ★ +1	→ ✱ +2: 3. Irakli Yamarauli; 4. Sofi Kotorashvili	→ ✱ +2: 5. Ucha Giguashvili; 6. Nato Lomidze	Zhanri Lolashvili → ✱ +6: 7. Saba Kopaliani; 8. Lasha Surmava	×
5	9 October 2026	7 ₾3,000	6	1. Mariam Mamadashvili → ✱ +1; 2. Ana Vashakidze → ✱ +1	→ ✱ +2: 3. Anna Kukasova; 4. Giorgi Tsuladze	→ ✱ +2: 5. Vikaeva Kochiashvili; 6. Teossha	Nino Chkheidze → ★ +6: 7. Fikria Tkemaladze; 8. Nutsa Orjonikidze	9. Giga Gogashvili → ★ +1
6	16 October 2026	11 ₾3,000	1	1. Meako Baglavadze → ✱ +1; 2. Zurab Gogishvili → ★ +1	→ ★ +2: 3. Nika Zariashvili; 4. Salome Kapliani	→ ★ +2: 5. Manana Tsitsilashvili; 6. Sofo Kurtanidze	Eter Kakulia → ★ +6: 7. Tamuna Leshkasheli; 8. Marzuda Makharashvili	×
7	23 October 2026	8 ₾3,000	4	1. Gvantsa Tsikladze → ★ +1; 2. Kote Neparishvili → ★ +1	→ ✱ +2: 3. Sandro Partsvania; 4. Mariam Deminashvili	→ ✱ +2: 5. Levani Vardashvili; 6. Mariam Kavtaradze	Tika Patsatsia → ★ +6: 7. Nina Tskvariashvili; 8. Teona Golodze	×
8	30 October 2026	1	11 ₾3,000	1. Natia Lomsadze → ✱ +1; 2. Nina Mamuchashvili → ★ +1	→ ✱ +2: 3. Mariam Kurtadze; 4. Giorgi Kakaladze	→ ✱ +2: 5. Kristina Jgernaia; 6. Mariam Satvari	Medea Japaridze and Batu Kraveishvili (Note: Impersonations: Medea Japaridze and Batu Kraveishvili (ep. 8) — both portraying as Keto and Kote in the 1948 titular film) → ✱ +6: 7. Anano Jintcharadze; 8. Luka Kavshvaia	×
9	6 November 2026	8 ₾3,000	4	1. Giga Grubelashvili → ✱ +1; 2. Elene Kabadadze → ✱ +1	→ ★ +2: 3. Eti Broladze; 4. Gocha Chinchiladze	→ ✱ +2: 5. Giorgi Kachkachishvili; 6. Nika Abuladze	Temur Tsiklauri → ★ +6: 7. Merab Lataria; 8. Tevdore Ekizashvili	×
10	13 November 2026	7 ₾3,000	5	1. Ani Gevorqiani → ★ +1; 2. Dato Putkaradze → ✱ +1	→ ✱ +2: 3. Barbara Bell; 4. Nini Maspinjelashvili	→ ✱ +2: 5. Nino Shekriladze; 6. Zura Chanturidze	Elvis Presley → ★ +6: 7. Eduard Kazariani; 8. Luka Kankava	×
11	20 November 2026							Pending
12	27 November 2026							Pending
13	4 December 2026							Pending
14	11 December 2026							Pending
Total		Games: ★ Stars 6–4 ✱ Invaders; Points: ★ Stars 52–69 ✱ Invaders						
