= Laila Peak =

There are three peaks in Pakistan named Laila Peak.

- Laila Peak (Hushe Valley) (6096 or 6614m) in Hushe Valley, Karakoram,
- Laila Peak (Haramosh Valley) (6985m) in Haramosh Valley, Karakoram (near Chogurunma Glacier),
- Laila Peak (Rupal Valley) (5971m) in Rupal Valley, Himalaya.

Other peak:

- Laila Peak (Caucasus) (approx. 4000m) in Svaneti, Georgia.

== See also ==
- List of Mountains in Pakistan
- Gilgit-Baltistan
- Highest Mountains of the World
