= Tsurtsumia =

Tsurtsumia (Georgian: წურწუმია) is a Georgian surname. Notable people with the surname include:

- Georgiy Tsurtsumia (born 1980), Kazakh wrestler
- Lela Tsurtsumia (born 1969), Georgian pop singer
- Nugzari Tsurtsumia (born 1997), Georgian Greco-Roman wrestler
