= Khaney =

Coordinates: 35°20′N 76°23′E

Khaney کھانے
- Village
- Interactive map of Khaney
- Location in Pakistan Khaney (Pakistan)
- Country: Pakistan
- State: Gilgit-Baltistan
- District: Ghanche
- Tehsil: Chorbat
- Union council: Machulo

Government

Population (1994)
  - Total: 931
- Time zone: UTC+5 (PST)
- Area code: 05816

Khaney (Urdu: کھانے; pronounced [kʰɑːneː]) is a village in Ghanche District in the Gilgit-Baltistan region of Pakistan. It lies in the Hushe Valley and located en route to Gondogoro Trek with K2 via Concordia.

== Demographs ==
The population speak Balti and are followers of the Noorbakshia sect of Islam.
