= Vaniko Tarkhnishvili =

Georgian actor, director and TV presenter

- Born: Ivane Tarkhnishvili; 9 October 1981 (age 44); Tbilisi, Georgian SSR, Soviet Union
- Occupations: Actor, director, speaker, TV Host
- Years active: 1998–present

Vaniko Tarkhnishvili (Georgian: ვანიკო თარხნიშვილი, also known as Vano Tarkhnishvili; born 9 October 1981 in Tbilisi) is a Georgian actor, director and TV presenter.

== Filmography ==
=== Theatre parts ===
- Pygmalion
- Bakula’s Pigs
- Our Small City
- National Hymn
- Tartuffe
- Pathetic monologues
- CO2

=== Movie parts ===
- Listen To Chopin
- Delirium
- Girls and Boys
- Chifsebis Taoba
- Our Office
- Tbilisiuri Love Story
- Rats Kvelaze Dzalian Gikvars
- Rats Kvelaze Dzalian Gikvars 2
- Born in Georgia

=== TV series parts ===
- My Wife's Girlfriends

=== Other ===
From February 1, 2010 he is hosting Nichieri (ნიჭიერი, Georgian version of Got Talent) with Tika Patsatsia.
