= Vigne Glacier =

Glacier in Pakistan

- وینیہ گلیشیر (Urdu)
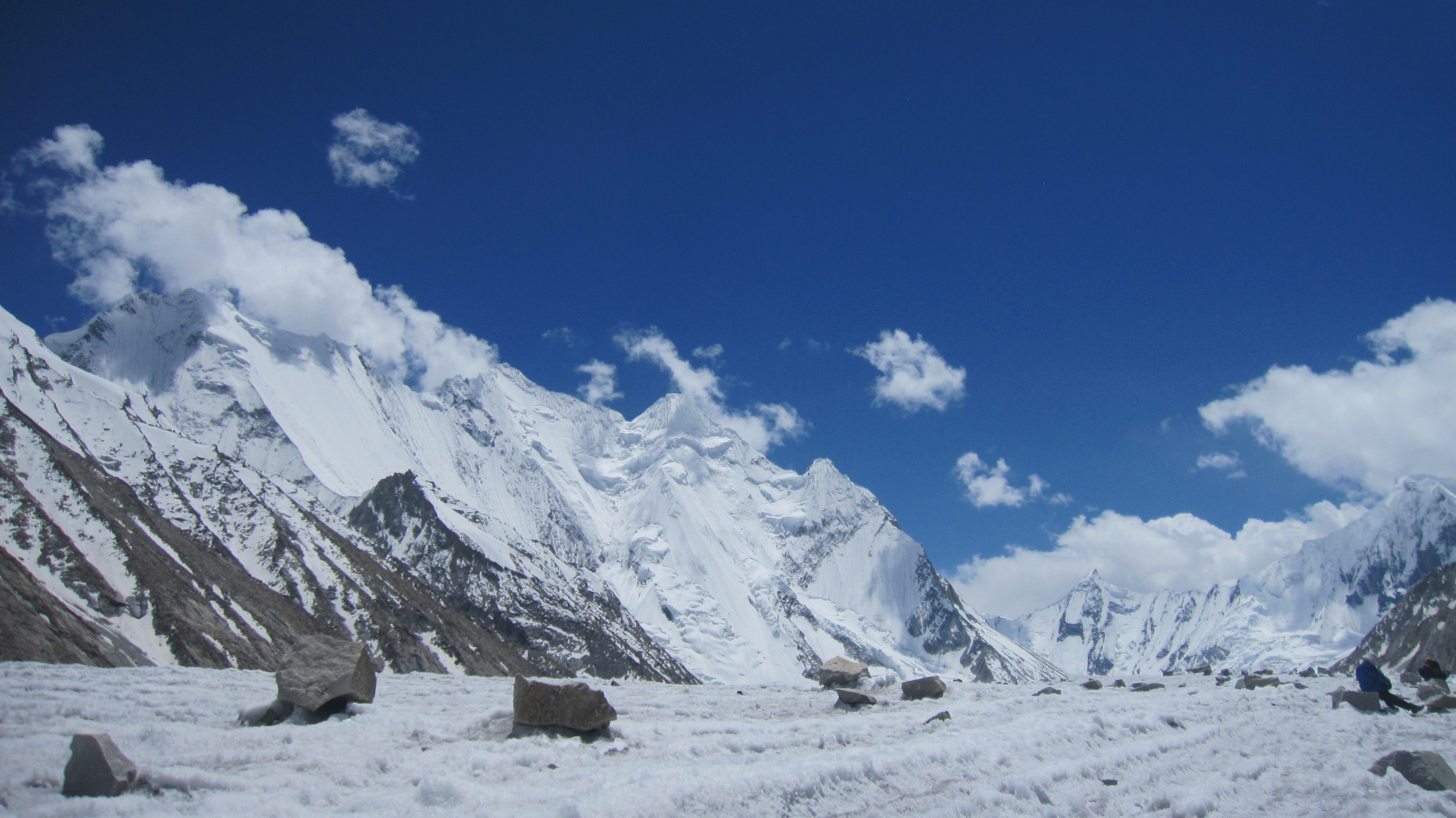
- Vigne glacier, looking south

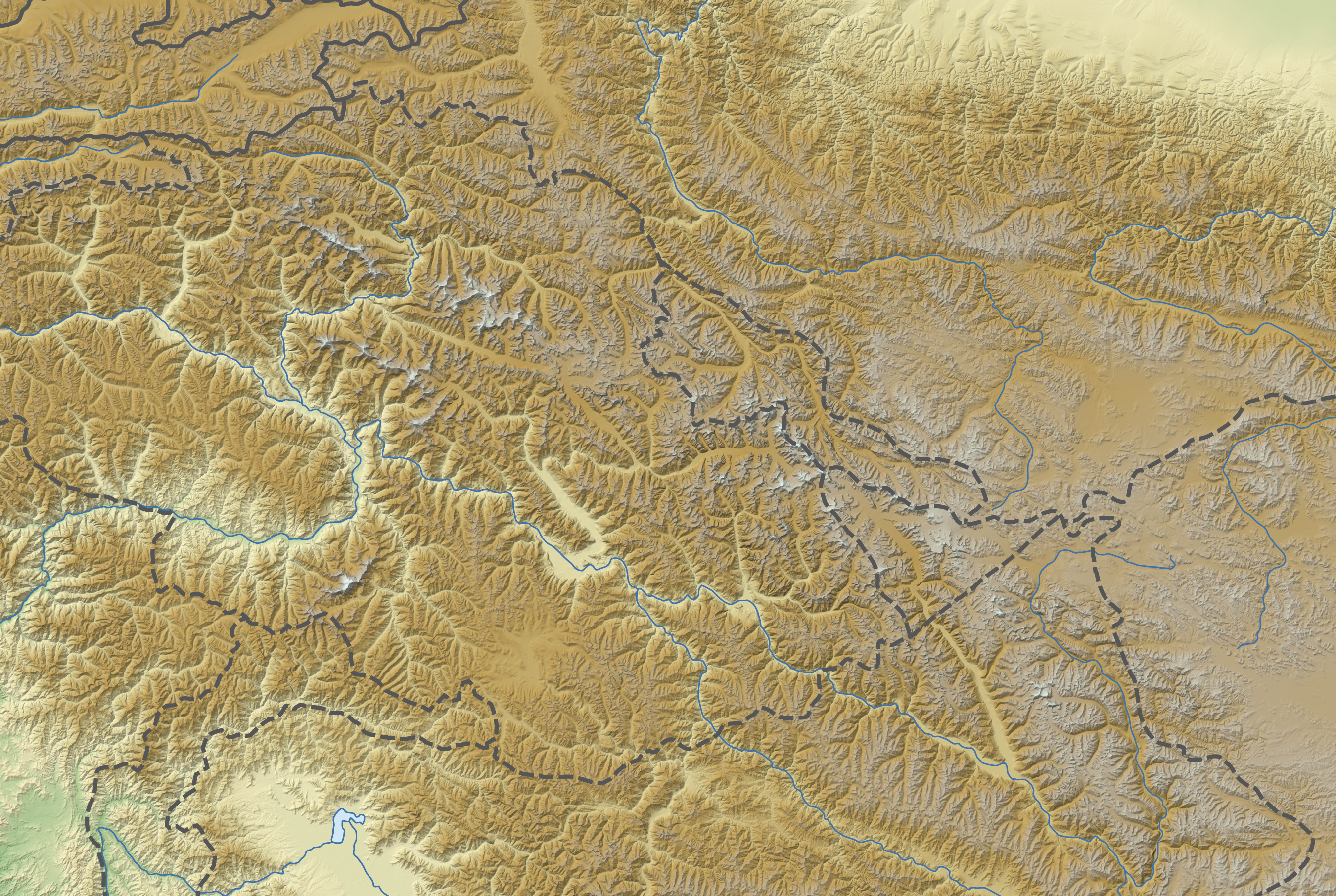
- Location within Karakoram Location within Gilgit Baltistan
- Interactive map of Vigne Glacier
- Type: Mountain glacier
- Location: Karakoram range, Baltistan, Pakistan
- Coordinates: 35°38′26″N 76°44′22″E
- Length: 10 kilometres (6 mi)

Vigne Glacier (Balti: ཝིགྣེ་གང།, romanized: wigne gang, lit. 'Wigne Glacier'; Urdu: وینیہ گلیشیر) is a glacier in Gilgit–Baltistan, Pakistan near Gondogoro Glacier and Baltoro Glacier. It provides access to Gondogoro (La) Pass.

== History ==
The glacier was named by Martin Conway after Godfrey Vigne (1801-1863), an early British traveler in Kashmir and Baltistan.

== See also ==
- Baltoro Glacier
- Gondogoro Glacier
- Gondogoro Pass
- List of mountains in Pakistan
- List of highest mountains
- List of glaciers
- Tourism in Pakistan
