= Giorgi Gabunia =

Georgian journalist and host

Giorgi Gabunia გიორგი გაბუნია

Personal details
- Born: 28 July 1975 (age 51) Tbilisi, Georgian SSR, Soviet Union

Giorgi Gabunia (Georgian: გიორგი გაბუნია, [ɡiˈɔrɡi ɡɑˈbunjɑ], born 28 July 1975) is a Georgian journalist and presenter, son of Georgian actor and presenter Julieta Vashakmadze. He is a news reporter of Rustavi 2 and Mtavari Arkhi, and is the CEO of Mtavari Arkhi.

== Early life ==
Gabuina was born on 28 July, 1975 in Tbilisi to Georgian parents. He graduated from Georgian Technical University in 1997 with a degree in administration.

== Career ==
Gabuina was the host of a program called "P.S." January 2017-July 2019 on Rustavi 2 and "Post Factum" September 2019-May 2022 on Mtavari Arkhi. On 7 July 2019, during the Gavrilov's Night rallies, instead of delivering the standard Georgian introduction to his program, he addressed Russian President Vladimir Putin in Russian, delivering a profanity-laced speech.

== Assassination Attempt ==
The State Security Service of Georgia announced the arrest of a Russian citizen on 15 July 2020 for an assassination attempt on Giorgi Gabunia, who had insulted Putin in past. Georgian media and Gabunia's boss later claimed the assassin was sent by Ramzan Kadyrov, who denied the allegations and said that if he had sent someone to kill, they would succeed. Kadyrov called Gabunia his enemy and said that he should beg for forgiveness by getting down on his knees, otherwise he would continue to remain one. Georgian authorities have not confirmed or denied the allegations against Kadyrov.
