= Gondogoro Pass =

Pakistani mountain pass

- གོནྡོ་གོརོ་ལ། (Balti)
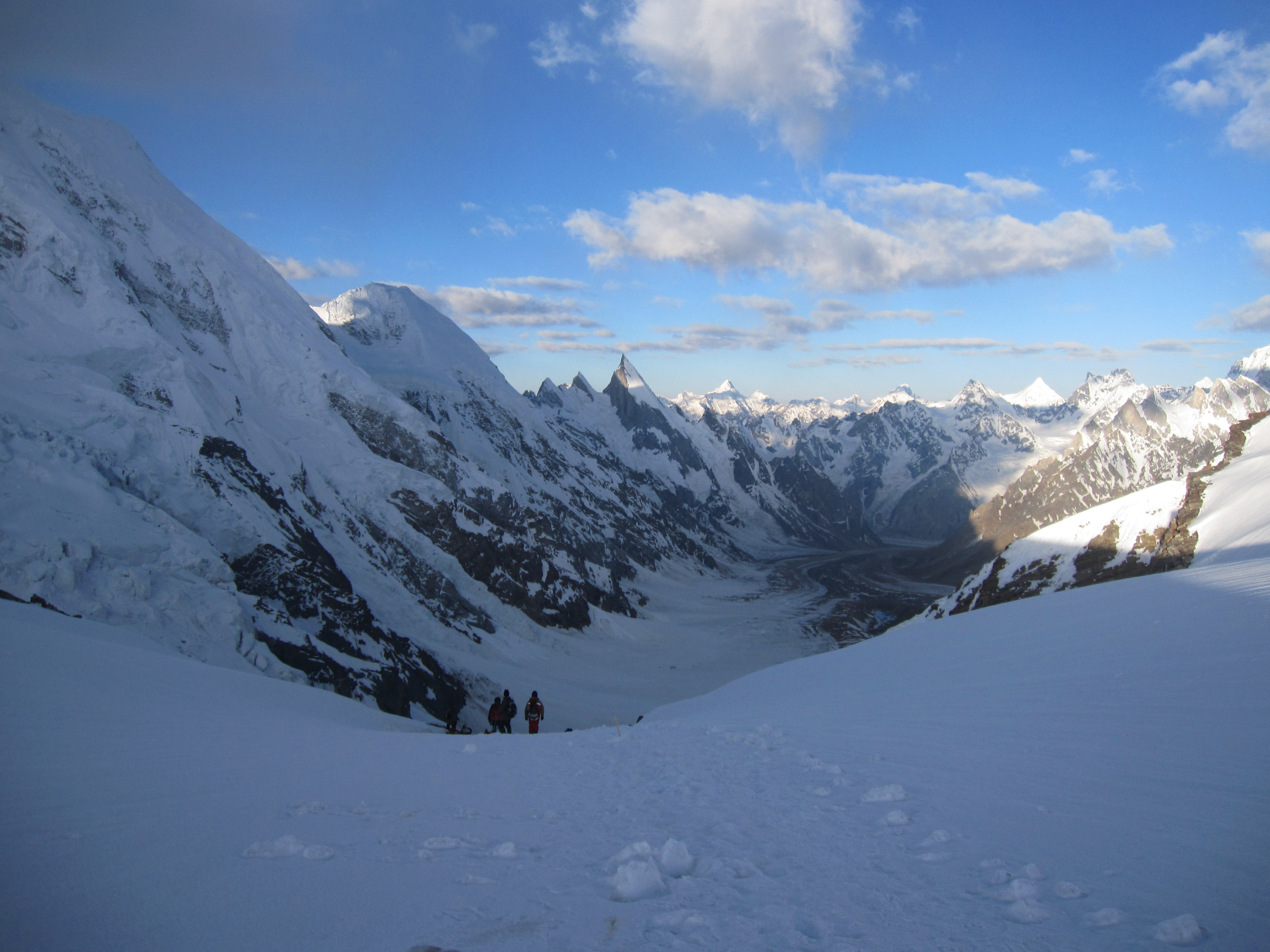
- View of Hushe Valley from Gondogoro Pass

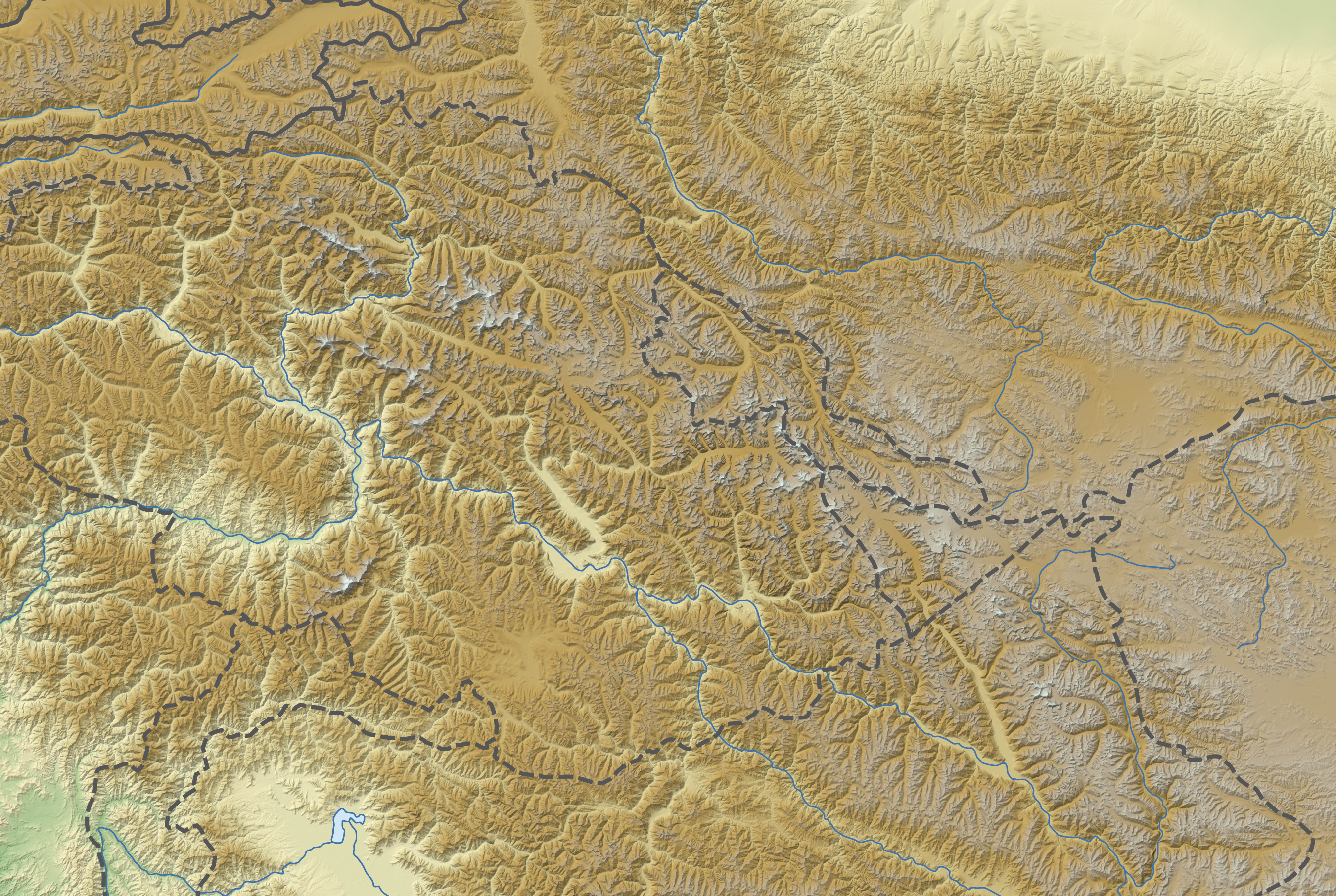
- Location within Karakoram Location within Gilgit Baltistan
- Interactive map of Gondogoro Pass
- Elevation: 5,585 metres (18,323 ft)(5585 on SRTM 30 meter); the climbing route crosses not at the low point of the pass, but higher and just to the west (at 5618m based on numerous GPS calculations

Third Approach
- Location: Pakistan (Hushe, in Ghanche District, is 25 km to the southwest)
- Range: Karakoram
- Coordinates: 35°39′09″N 76°28′28″E

Gondogoro Pass (Balti: གོནྡོ་གོརོ་ལ།, romanized: Gondo goro la; Urdu: گوندوگرو) is a mountain pass that stands at an elevation of 5585 meters. It is located in the Baltistan region of Pakistan, approximately 25 km south of the world's second-highest peak, K2. This pass serves as a connection between the Gondogoro Glacier to the southwest and the Vigne Glacier to the northeast.

On the southwest side of the pass, the route descends into the Hushe village, which contains the highest settlements in the Ghangche District.

== Tourism ==
Most climbers and trekkers approach Gondogoro Pass from the northeast side. In 1986, a route was established that connects Concordia in the upper Baltoro Glacier to the Hushe Valley by crossing the Gondogoro Pass. Since then, the pass has become a popular destination for trekkers and climbers. It offers views of the Karakoram's 8000m peaks.

The Gondogoro La, while a popular trekking route, presents challenging conditions. It involves Class 4 climbing that necessitates the use of crampons. On the northeast side, there are steep snow slopes with angles of up to 50 degrees, which pose avalanche risks and often require the use of fixed ropes. The southwest side presents a longer and continuous 50-degree slope, accompanied by potential rockfall and avalanche hazards, which may require the installation of up to 300 meters of fixed ropes.

On 17 July 2021, Yahya Aziz, a 10-year-old from Lahore, Pakistan, crossed the Gondogoro La and reached K2 base camp, becoming the youngest person to do so.

== When to visit ==
The pass is easier to cross earlier in the season and can be attempted as early as the last three or four days in June; earlier and one is likely to be the first party of the season to break the trail. By August, objective dangers from crevasses, avalanches and rock fall increase substantially as the snow cover begins to melt.

The pass may be approached either from the Askole village up the Baltoro Glacier valley to Concordia and then Ali Camp on Vigne Glacier northeast of the pass, or via the Hushe Valley (past the mouths of the Charakusa Glacier valley on the east and the Masherbrum glacier valley on the northwest, and passing just west of Laila Peak.

Even though the ascending and descending sides of the pass have fixed dynamic ropes, crossing this pass requires judgement, fitness, prior acclimatisation, and basic mountaineering skills. High altitude local climbers remain near the top of the pass during the climbing season to maintain the ropes and assist.

== Notable features ==
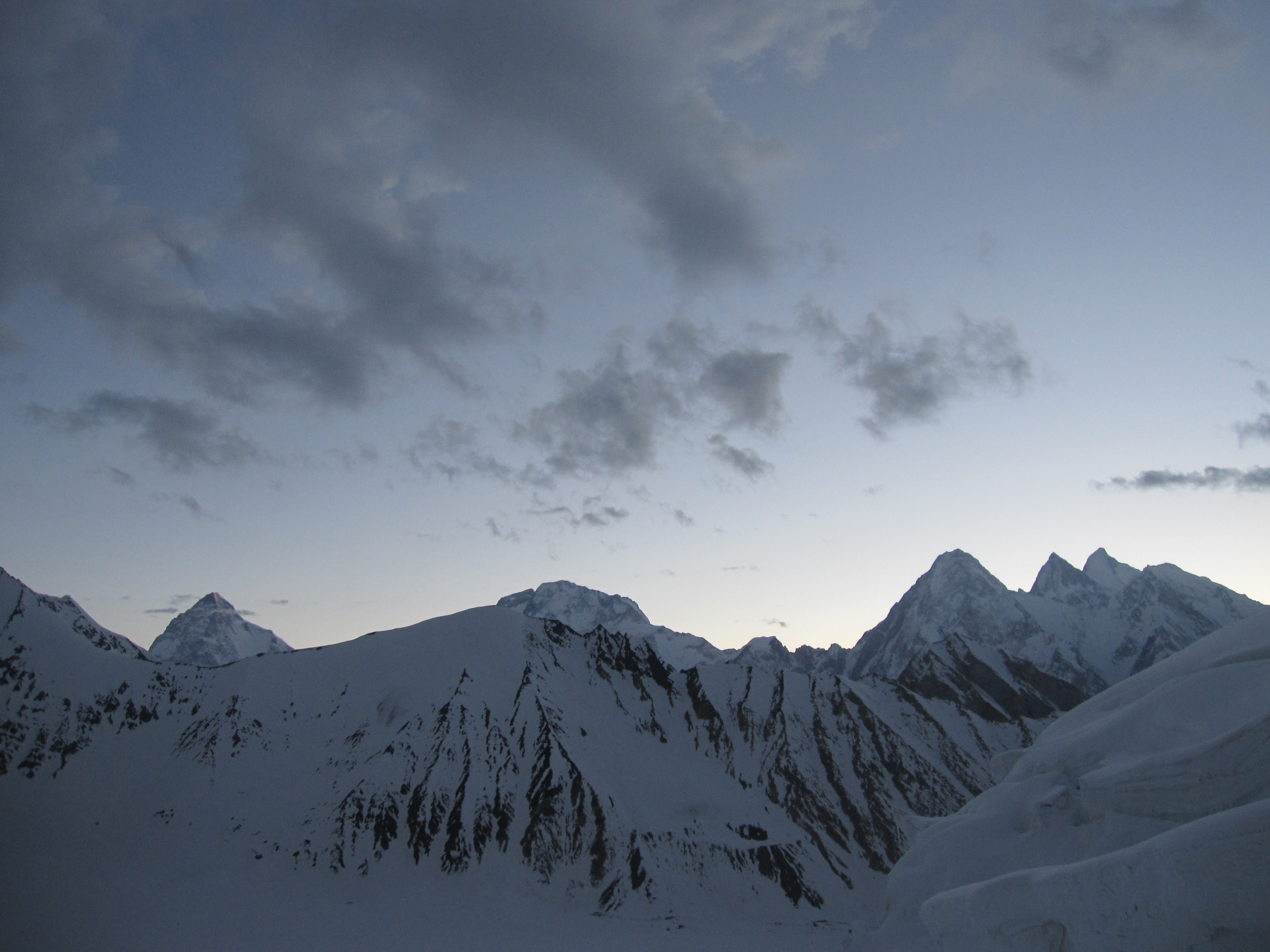
View at dawn of 8,000 and near- 8,000 meter peaks from Gondogoro Pass. In the background (from left to right): K2, Broad Peak, Gasherbrum IV, Gasherbrum III, Gasherbrum II

Numerous climbers regard this region as having some of the finest mountain scenery. Gondogoro Pass overlooks to the northeast what Galen Rowell termed the "Throne Room of the Mountain Gods." Apart from dozens more, one can see the following peaks from the pass:

- K2 (Choghori)
- Broad Peak
- Masherbrum
- Laila Peak
- Gasherbrum I
- Gasherbrum II
- Gasherbrum III
- Gasherbrum IV
- Trinity Peak

== See also ==
- Gondogoro Glacier
- Laila Peak (Hushe Valley)
