= Maia Asatiani =

Georgian television host

Maia Asatiani (Georgian: მაია ასათიანი; born May 4, 1977) is a Georgian TV host, journalist, and businesswoman. She is the founder of the cosmetics and beauty line 'M110', which she launched in June 2025. She hosts the talk-show Profili. She was one of the three judges in Nichieri's first season.
