= Laila Peak (Caucasus) =

Highest mountain of Svaneti Range, Caucasus Mountains, Georgia

Laila
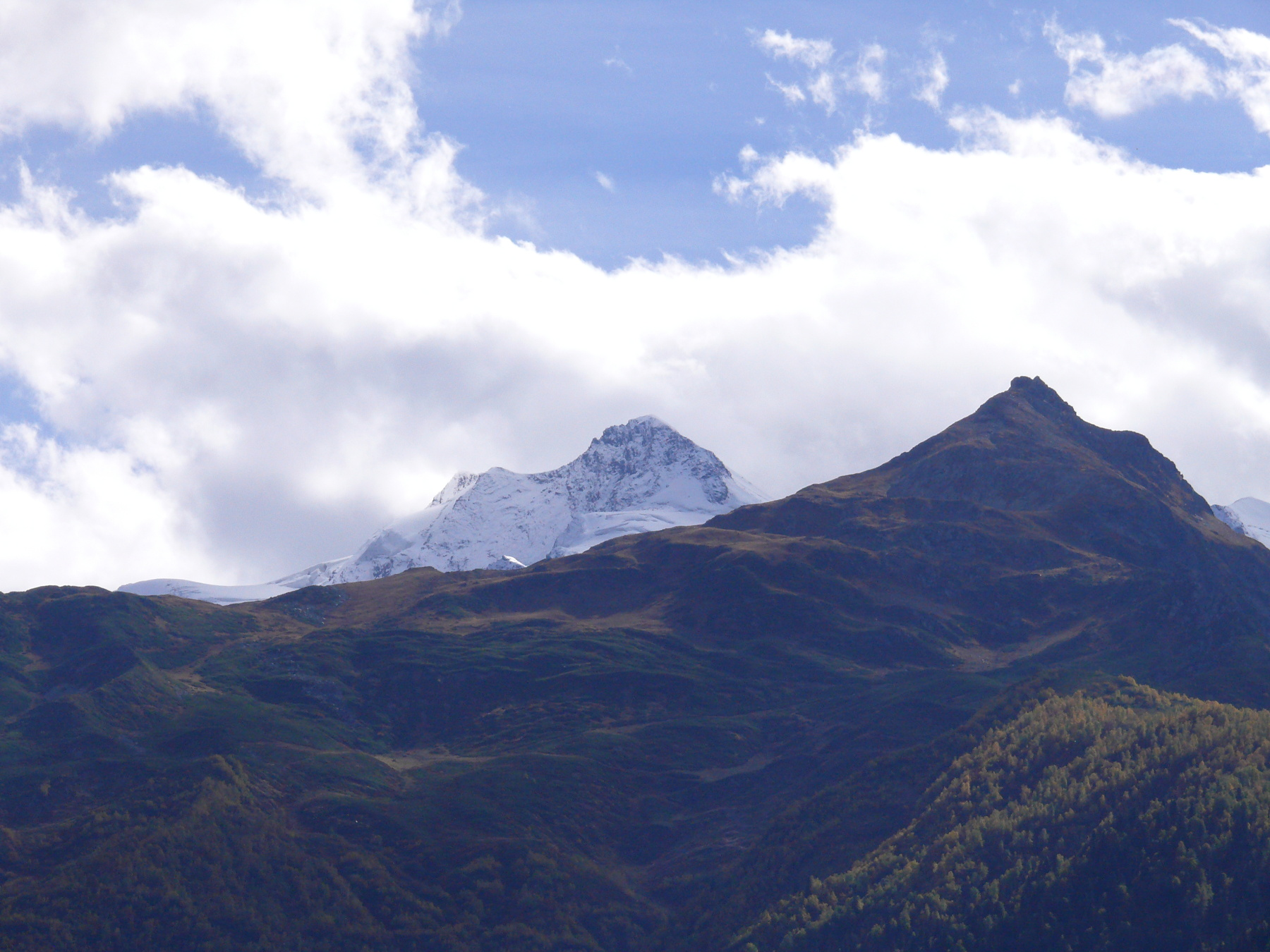
- Laila

Highest point
- Elevation: 4,008 m (13,150 ft)
- Prominence: 1,395 m (4,577 ft)
- Isolation: 22.76 km (14.14 mi)
- Listing: Ribu
- Coordinates: 42°55′13″N 42°33′25″E

Geography
- Location within Georgia
- Country: Georgia
- Regions: Racha-Lechkhumi and Kvemo Svaneti and Samegrelo-Zemo Svaneti
- Parent range: Svaneti Range

Climbing
- Easiest route: basic snow/ice climb

Mount Laila, Lahili (Georgian: ლაჰილი), Lailchala (Georgian: ლაილჭალა) also known as Lahla, is the highest peak of the Svaneti Range in Georgia. The elevation of the summit is 4,009 metres (13,153 ft) above sea level. Lahili's geological makeup mostly consists of Upper Palaeozoic-Triassic quartzite, metamorphic rock and sandstone. The mountain is covered by snow and ice. The northern slope of the summit contains several valley glaciers; notably, the Lahili Glacier descends from the summit down to an elevation of 2,220 metres (7,283 ft) above sea level.
