= Laila Peak (Hushe Valley) =

Mountain in Pakistan

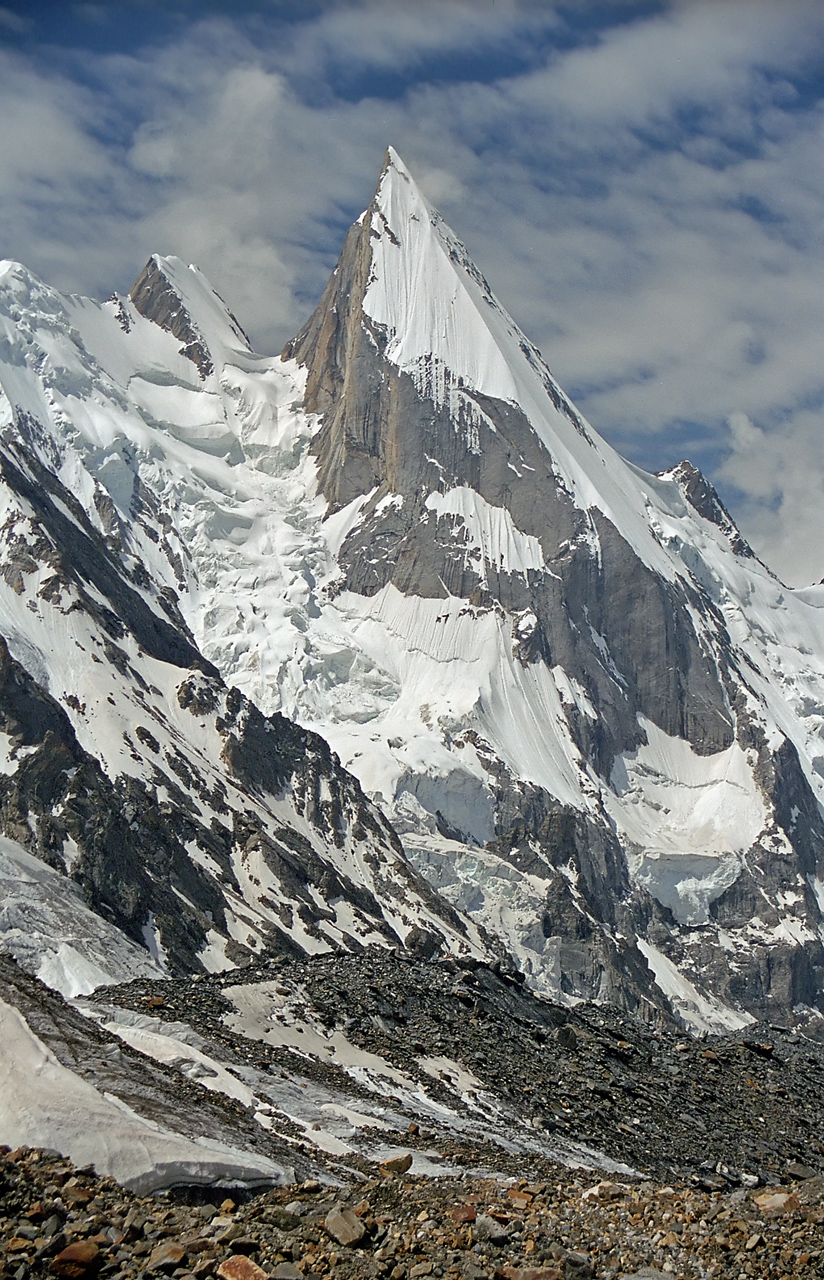
- Laila Peak from Gondogoro Glacier

Highest point
- Elevation: 6,096 m (20,000 ft)
- Prominence: 601.9 m (1,975 ft)
- Coordinates: 35°35′28.4″N 76°24′19.5″E

Naming
- Native name: لیلی چوٹی

Geography
- Location within Pakistan Location within Gilgit Baltistan
- Location: Gilgit-Baltistan, Pakistan
- Parent range: Karakoram

Climbing
- First ascent: Not Recorded

Laila Peak (Urdu: لیلی چوٹی) is a mountain located in the Hushe Valley, near the Gondogoro Glacier within the Karakoram. Situated in the Gilgit-Baltistan region of Pakistan, Laila Peak has an elevation of 6,096 metres (20,000 ft). Its distinctive feature is its spear-like shape, and its northwest face presents a challenging slope of 45 degrees, spanning over 1,500 vertical meters. The height of Laila Peak in the Hushe Valley has been a subject of controversy and discrepancy. Various sources and maps have mentioned different elevations for the peak. Some believe it to be around 6,200 meters, while others suggest it as 6,614 metres (21,699 ft). However, according to a Japanese mountaineering map by Tsuneo Miyamori published in 2003, the height of Laila Peak is listed as 6,096 meters.

Laila Peak has been successfully climbed by mountaineers such as Simon Yates, among others. According to the local inhabitants of Hushe, this peak has been summited only twice, with a total of just seven individuals having reached its summit. Laila Peak was climbed in winter for the first time by Spanish mountaineers Alex Txikon and José Fernandez in February 2013. The mountain lies in a restricted zone, and non-Pakistani visitors must get a permit, hire a guide, and purchase accident insurance for the entire party. Double Olympic champion Laura Dahlmeier died while climbing Laila Peak when she was struck by falling rocks on 28 July 2025.

In the summer of 2005, Fredrik Ericsson and Jörgen Aamot from Scandinavian countries undertook the first-ever ski attempts on Laila Peak. While they were unable to reach the summit, they did manage to ski down the North-West face of the peak towards Gondogoro Glacier. They described Laila Peak as "one of the most amazing mountains they have ever seen, like a needle it points straight up in the sky". The second group ever to attempt to ski the mountain was Paul Holding (UK), Brendan O'Sullivan (Ireland), Ed Blanchard Wrigglesworth (Spain) and Luca Pandolfi (Italy). All were the first snowboarders (two on splitboards) on the mountain except for Wrigglesworth, who was on skis. They reached the col at 5,400m only to find that the whole left side of the face had avalanched down to rock while they were climbing from the south side, preventing any attempts for that year. A further attempt to summit the Laila was made in June 2016 by an Italian expedition composed by Zeno Cecon (Tarvisio - UD), Carlo Cosi (Padova), Enrico Mosetti (Gorizia) and Leonardo Comelli (Trieste). During an attempt to summit the peak the group decided to turn back due to the amount of snow 150m below the summit. During the ski descent, in a traverse Comelli fell 400 metres (1,300 ft) to his death.

Laila Peak in Hushe Valley should not be confused with the comparatively less famous Laila Peak (5971m) in the Rupal Valley.

== See also ==
- List of highest mountains on Earth
- List of mountains in Pakistan
