= Svaneti Range =

Mountain range in the southwestern Caucasus Mountains, Georgia

- View of Svipi, Tviberi and Lezgara from Kalashi

Highest point
- Peak: Mount Laila
- Elevation: 4,009 m (13,153 ft)

Dimensions
- Length: 85 km (53 mi) W-E

Geography
- Location within Georgia Location within Samegrelo-Zemo Svaneti
- Country: Georgia
- Province: Svaneti
- Range coordinates: 42°54′N 42°46′E
- Parent range: Caucasus Mountains
- Borders on: Greater Caucasus

Svaneti Range (Georgian: სვანეთის ქედი) is an 85 km long sub-mountain range of the Greater Caucasus, in the Svaneti region of Georgia, located south of the main Caucasus ridge in a west–east direction.

The Svaneti Range runs along the border between the regions of Racha-Lechkhumi and Kvemo Svaneti and Samegrelo-Zemo Svaneti (North and South Svaneti) in the north of Georgia. It forms the watershed between the Enguri River (to the north and west) and the Tskhenistsqali (to the south). The right Tskhenistsqali tributary Cheledula separates the mountains from the further south Egrisi Range. The Svanetic Mountains reach a maximum altitude of 4009 m at the Lahili Peak. The ridge is partially glacier.

== Geology ==
Svaneti Range is composed mainly of sedimentary ( mica, schist ) and partly of metamorphic rocks ( quartzite, slate ).

== Vegetation ==
On the slopes grow subalpine and alpine vegetation. The slopes of the Svaneti Range at lower elevations are covered with forests of beech, spruce and fir.

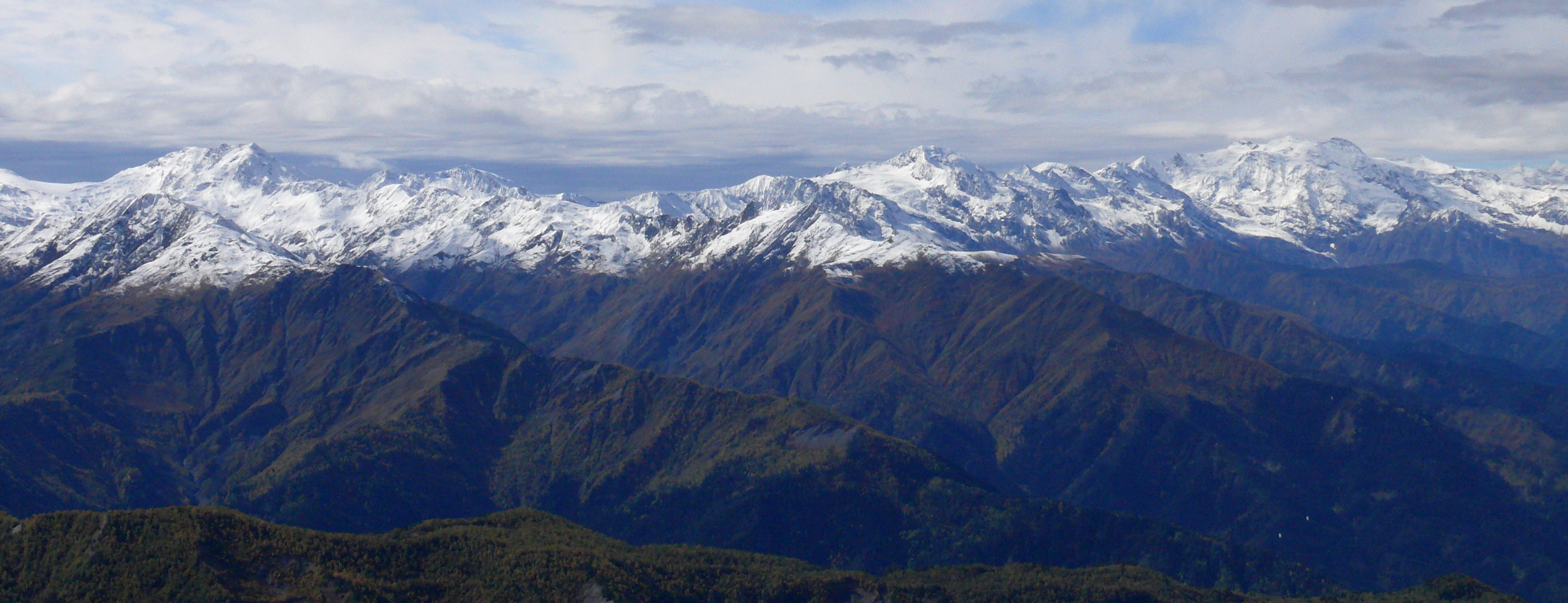
Svaneti Range, seen from the hillside of Tetnuldi. Peaks from left to right: Mt Nekpash, Mt Gvadarashi and Mt Lahili
