= Gondogoro Glacier =

Glacier in Pakistan

Gondogoro Glacier گوندوگرو گلیشیر
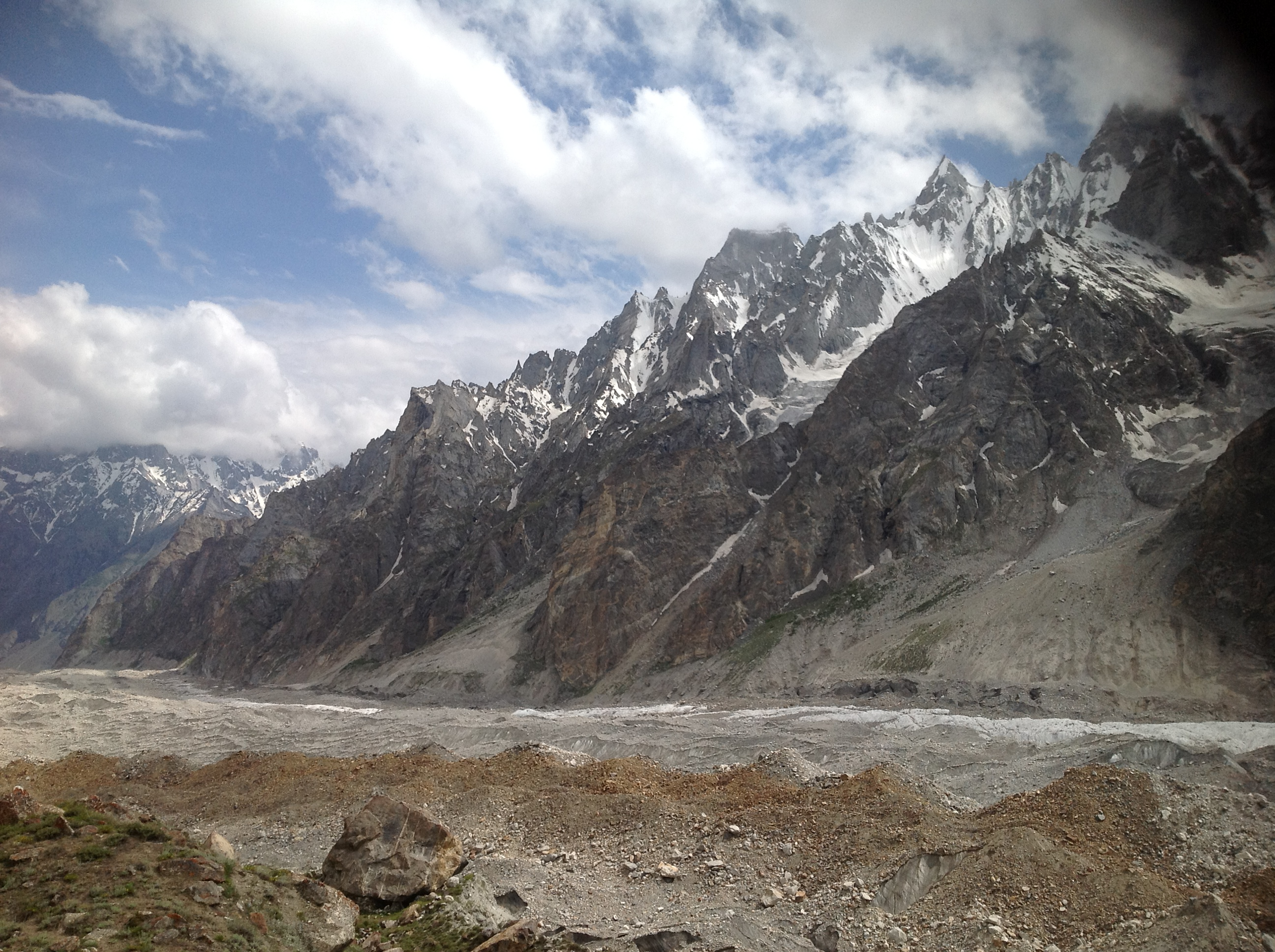
- View of Gondogoro Glacier, looking south

- Location within Karakoram Location within Gilgit Baltistan Location within Pakistan
- Interactive map of Gondogoro Glacier گوندوگرو گلیشیر
- Type: Mountain glacier
- Location: Karakoram range, Baltistan, Pakistan
- Coordinates: 35°35′07″N 76°22′21″E
- Length: 12 kilometres (7 mi)

Gondogoro Glacier (Urdu: گوندوگرو گلیشیر) or Gondoghoro Glacier is a glacier near Concordia in Gilgit-Baltistan, Pakistan. It serves as an alternative means to reach Concordia, the confluence of Baltoro Glacier and Godwin-Austen Glacier.

Situated at an elevation of 5,940 metres in the Baltistan Division, Gondogoro connects Concordia in Shigar District with Hushe in Ghanche District. The Gondogoro Pass is renowned for its panoramic views and holds significance in trekking and mountaineering, offering a striking display of Baltistan's diverse and rugged landscapes.

Gondogoro is typically crossed at night, as the pass is considered more susceptible to avalanches during daylight hours.

== See also ==
- Gondogoro Pass
- List of mountains in Pakistan
- List of highest mountains
- List of glaciers
