= Irma Sokhadze =

Georgian singer and pianist

- ირმა სოხაძე
- Born: 28 November 1955 (age 70); Tbilisi, Soviet Union
- Occupations: Singer-Songwriter, Composer, Poet, Public Figure, Television Host, Pianist
- Years active: 1960-
- Children: 2
- Relatives: Revaz Asatiani (husband) Salome Asatiani (daughter) Nata Asatiani (daughter)

Irma Sokhadze (Georgian: ირმა სოხაძე, stylized Irma Sokhadze) is a Georgian media personality, singer-songwriter, composer, poet, television host, and pianist.

She performed and toured as an eight-year-old, becoming a child star with "An Orange Song" which was specially written for her. In addition to pop songs, she has specialized in both jazz and classical music and has composed songs to her own lyrics. For 25 years, Sokhadze hosted Georgian television programmes on music, including TV marathons to provide financial support for needy children and their families. In 2014, she appeared in her own special concert in Tbilisi, celebrating a career spanning 50 years.

== Biography ==
Irma Sokhadze was born in 1955 into a family of an engineer, her father, and a linguist, her mother. They introduced her to music when she was just two years old, when she sang at home with her parents and brother. When she was five, she made her first appearance on television, singing one song in Italian and another in Georgian. Two years later, she gained wide popularity singing the "Orange Song" in Moscow, with lyrics specially written for her by Grigory Gorin and Arkady Arkanov to music composed by Konstantin Pevzner. She became a soloist with the Georgian State Orchestra and went on tour to several countries. In 1966, she performed at the Olympia in Paris.

As a gifted child, she attended Tbilisi's Central School of Music, matriculating with honours in 1974. She also studied piano and musicology at the Conservatory, graduating with honours in 1979.

From 1980 to 2004, Sokhadze made frequent broadcasts on Georgian television, where she also worked as an editor and author. In particular, in the 1990s she presented a series of marathons as a means of providing support to children who had suffered in the Abkhazia War. She founded the Children's Music Theatre Studio in 1984, presenting musicals she had written herself. In 1988, she played the leading role in Nezhnost' (Tenderness) in Moscow's Operetta Theatre.

In 2001, she co-wrote the lyrics for გაიღიმე (Gaighime) by Merab Sephashvili, which would find fame as an anthem for the Georgian national football team during UEFA Euro 2024.

She released her debut studio album შეგირიგდები (Shegirigdebi) on November 17, 2004. The album's first song and title track "შეგირიგდები (Shegirigdebi)", also known by its alternative name "დრო როგორ გავიდა (Dro Rogor Gavida)" became a hit in Georgia, being played on radio stations and later amassing over 1.9 million views on YouTube.

In 2014, she appeared in her own special concert in Tbilisi, celebrating a career spanning 50 years.

== Personal life ==
She is married to Rezo Asatiani, whom she has frequently performed and sung with throughout her career.

The pair has two daughters, the first was born in 1976 and the second in 1985.

She still lives in Tbilisi.

== Discography ==
Title	Album details		
Title	Album details	შეგირიგდები	Released: November 17, 2004; Label: GMI Rights Management; Format: CD, LP, Cassette, Digital download, streaming
