= Georgia's Got Talent =

- Titles of Georgia's Got Talent
- Genre: Reality show, talent show, entertainment
- Created by: Simon Cowell
- Presented by: Tika Patsatsia (1–4); Vano Tarkhnishvili (1–8); Giorgi Kipshidze (5–8); Gia Jajanidze (9); Giorgi Bakhutashvili (10); Nuki Koshkelishvili(10-); Tako Cohrgolashivili(11-)
- Judges: Gega Palavandishvili (1–4); Nikoloz Memanishvili (1); Maia Asatiani (1); Sopho Nizharadze (2–3); Vano Javakhishvili (2–3); Nika Gvaramia (4–7); Ia Parulava (4–6); Khatia Buniatishvili (4); Nanuka Zhorzholiani (4–6); Levan "Chola" Tsuladze (5–6); Ruska Makashvili (6–); Zaal Udumashvili (7); Maka Chichua (7–8); Stefane Mgebrishvili (8); Giorgi Bakhutashvili (8); Anri Jokhadze (9); Maka Kvitsiani (9); Dima Oboladze (9); Tika Patsatsia (10-); Tako Phakadze(10); Irakli Imnaishvili (10); Gigi Dedalamazishvili (11-); Mariam Sanogo (11-); Dato Porchkhidze (11-)
- Country of origin: Georgia

Production
- Running time: 30 minutes
- Production company: Fremantle

Original release
- Network: Rustavi 2 (1–7, 10–); Imedi TV (8–9)
- Release: February 1, 2010 – present

Related
- Got Talent

Georgia's Got Talent (Georgian: ნიჭიერი (Nichieri) - Talented) is the Georgian version of the Got Talent series. It launched on Rustavi 2 on February 1, 2010. Singers, dancers, comedians, variety acts, and other performers compete against each other for audience support. The winner of the show receives 500,000 laris ($279,500/€217,000/£185,500). It is hosted by Tika Patsatsia and Vano Tarkhnishvili. The judges are Nika Memanishvili, Maia Asatiani and Gega Palavandishvili.

== Season 1 (2010) ==
The first season of Georgia's Got Talent!, which started on February 1, 2010, and ended on May 3, was won by Levan Shavadze, singer.

No.	Name	Talent	Number in finals	% of votes	Place
01	Next Level	Hip-hop dance	9121	3.2%	9th
02	Babi and Mari	Singing and cabaret	9122	5.4%	6th
03	Levan Shavadze	Singing	9123	28.2%	1st
04	Guga Chkonia	Beatbox, ბუნძი კაწვი	9124	4.1%	7th
05	Avto Natsarashvili	Playing bass guitar	9125	2.0%	11th
06	Ana Khanchaliani	Singing (soul music)	9126	10.8%	4th
07	"Parkuri"	Parkour/acrobatics	9127	2.1%	10th
08	Verka and Giorgi	Dancing	9128	1.7%	12th
09	Mariam Kakhelishvili	Singing (R&B)	9129	15.7%	3rd
10	Davit Robakidze	Magician	9130	4.0%	8th
11	Mariam Pachulia	Singing (pop)	9131	5.8%	5th
12	Gulnaz Goletiani	Singing (folk)	9132	16.9%	2nd

== Season 2 (2011) ==
The second season aired in 2011. The winner was Vano Pipia, who is diagnosed with, and suffering from polio.

No.	Name	Talent	Number in finals	% of votes	Place
01	Phantom	Matrix pantomime	91001	2%	7th
02	The Datikashvilis	Folklore	91002	8.6%	2nd
03	Sandro Tsiskadze	Barman show	91003	1%	11th
04	Vano Pipia	Singing	91004	60%	1st
05	Natali Vepkhvadze	Singing	91005	6%	5th
06	"Saint George"	Karatekas' Group	91006	6.3%	4th
07	Duo from Catharsis	Singing	91007	1.2%	10th
08	Nick and Keti	Ballroom Dancing	91008	1.8%	8th
09	Mari Tomaradze	Singing	91009	4.6%	6th
10	Teona Koroshinadze	Singing	91010	1.6%	9th
11	"Acro Style"	Acrobatics	91011	6.9%	3rd

== Season 3 (2012) ==
The third season aired in 2012

No.	Name	Talent	Number in finals	% of votes	Place
01	Mariam Dalalishvili	Georgian Dance	0 900 100 101	4.7%	8th
02	Alligator	Karatistebis Group	0 900 100 102	8.7%	5th
03	Niniko Kakhadze	Singing	0 900 100 103	5.4%	7th
04	Nona Gunashvili	Sand painting	0 900 100 104	28.2%	1st
05	Otto Buadze	Rap	0 900 100 105	4%	9th
06	Blue Sail	Singing	0 900 100 106	14.1%	2nd
07	"Dream Walkers"	Modern Dance	0 900 100 107	2.4%	11th
08	TSU Art	Instrumental Music	0 900 100 108	1.3%	12th
09	Diamonds	Rock Opera	0 900 100 109	9.1%	4th
10	Luka Svanidze	Drums	0 900 100 110	12.8%	3rd
11	The Acrobat	Acrobatics	0 900 100 111	6.4%	6th
12	Lenka Zviadadze	Singing	0 900 100 112	2.9%	10th
