= Avtandil (designer) =

Georgian fashion designer

Avtandil Tskvitinidze ავთანდილ ცქვიტინიძე
- Born: 1973 (age 52–53); Georgian SSR, Soviet Union
- Education: Tbilisi State Academy of Arts
- Label: Avtandil

Avtandil (born 1973, stylized as AVTANDIL; Georgian: ავთანდილი) born Avtandil Tskvitinidze is a Georgian fashion designer based in Tbilisi, Georgia.

== Early life and education ==
Avtandil graduated from Tbilisi State Academy of Arts in 1995.

== Career ==
His clothes are sold in the United States, Germany, France, United Arab Emirates, Ukraine, Russia, and Kazakhstan.
