= Lela Tsurtsumia =

Georgian singer and actress (born 1969)

Lela Tsurtsumia ლელა წურწუმია
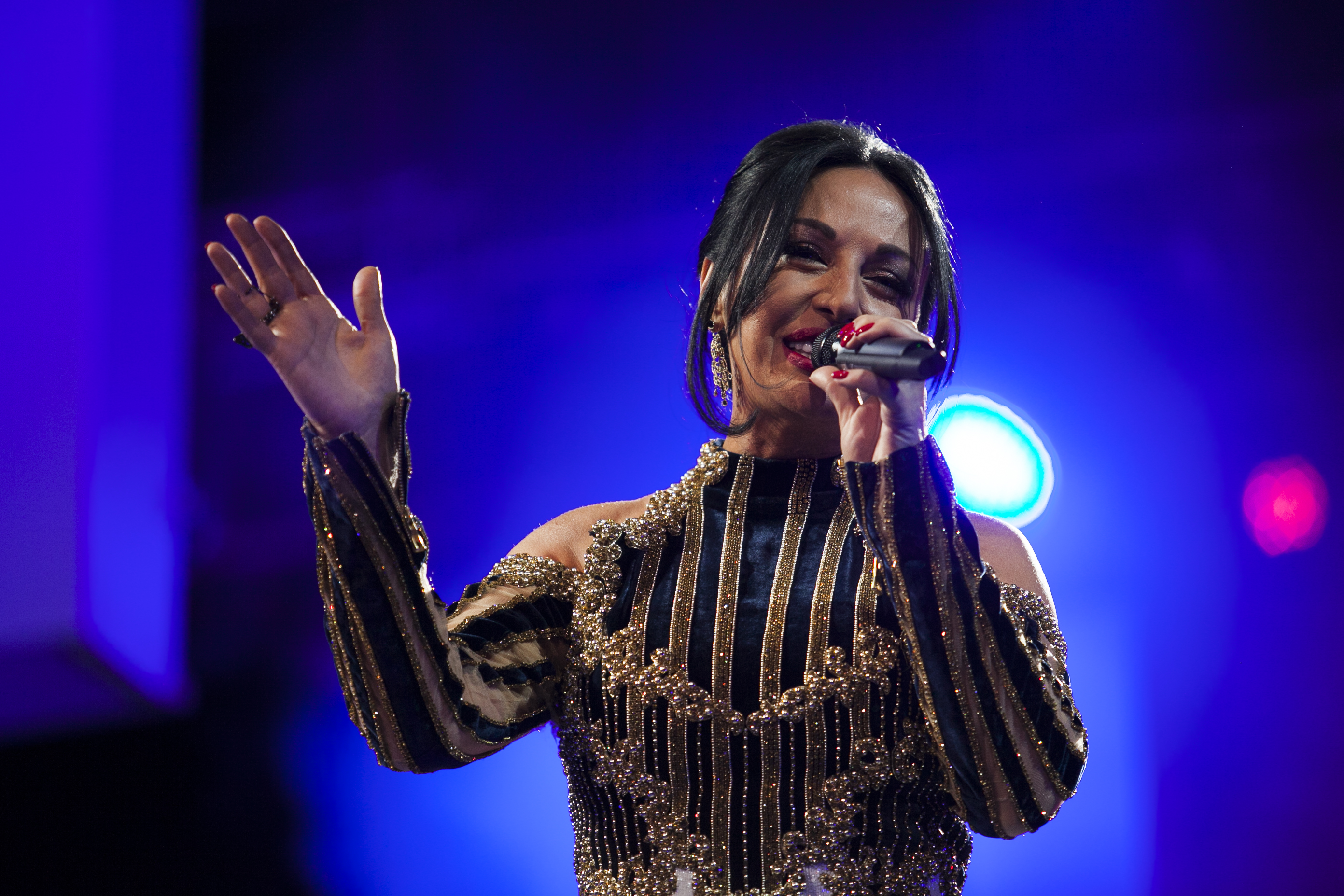

Background information
- Born: 12 February 1969 (age 57); Tbilisi, Georgian SSR
- Genres: Pop, soul, folk
- Occupations: Singer, actress
- Instrument: Vocals
- Years active: 1991–present

Lela Tsurtsumia (Georgian: ლელა წურწუმია; born - 12 February 1969) is a Georgian singer and actress. Born and raised in Tbilisi, she graduated from Shota Rustaveli Theatre and Film University. She sings in Georgian, Megrelian and Laz languages.

== Life and career ==
Lela Tsurtsumia was born on 12 February 1969 in Tbilisi. She began her musical journey at age five under vocal training.

From 1996 to 1999, Lela was a singer in the ensemble Taigouli. She started performing songs at the restaurant Europa, where she met her future husband and manager Kakha Mamulashvili. Her concert in 2000 was the first show concert in Georgia held by a Georgian singer.

In 2002, Tsurtsumia had another show at Tbilisi Sports Palace, with more than 25,000 spectators attending the show. Another record was set in 2003, when she released the album Suleli Tsvima (Stupid Rain), which sold more than 60,000 copies in Georgia. Tsurtsumia also released albums abroad, in the U.S. and Israel.

In 2006, Tsurtsumia appeared on stage with her live jazz band and had a live concert in Zugdidi in front of more than 40,000 people.

In 2007, Tsurtsumia signed with the label Art Lend and her albums were distributed on some European e-stores, such as The Orchard.

== Band ==
- Irakli Menteshashvili – keyboards
- Chabuka Amiranashvili – saxophone
- Maia Kachkachishvili – keyboards
- Lasha Abashmadze – bass guitar
- Levan Sharashidze – guitar
- Ramaz Khudoevi – percussion
- Nika Abashmadze – drums
- Vaska Kutuxov – garmoni
- Gio Mamula
- Shota – duduning

Backing vocals

- Rati Durglishvili
- Gvanca Kachkachishvili

Sound engineer

- Alex Nonikof

== Discography ==
=== Studio albums ===
- Paemani (A Date, 2000)
- Ocneba Shenze (Dream of You, 2000)
- Suleli Tsvima (Stupid Rain, 2003)
- Popular Duets (2005)
- Tsamebs Shentvis Vinakhav (I Keep Seconds For You, 2006)
- Yamo Helessa (Lord Have Mercy, 2006)

=== Compilation albums ===
- Sauketeso (The Best, 2002)
- The Best (Israel, 2006)
- The Best (USA, 2006)

== Filmography ==
=== Film ===
Year	Film	Role
2008	Piko	Film by Shota Kalandadze
2011	Darchi Chemtan ("Stay with Me")	Qeti
2011	Garigeba 20 Tslis Shemdeg ("Deal After 20 Years")	Tsiala
2022	The Knight in Tiger's Skin	Phatman
