= Tika Patsatsia =

- Birth name: Tinatin Patsatsia
- Also known as: Tika
- Born: 18 October 1981 (age 43); Tbilisi, Georgian SSR, Soviet Union
- Genres: Pop, jazz
- Occupation(s): Musician, model, tv host, actress
- Instrument(s): Vocals, guitar, piano
- Years active: 2000–present

Tinatin "Tika" Patsatsia (Georgian: თიკა ფაცაცია; born 18 October 1981 in Tbilisi, Georgia) is a Georgian model, singer, and TV host. She was Miss Tbilisi, Miss Georgia and reached the third place in Miss Golden Globe.

== Biography ==
In 1987, at the age of six, Patsatsia went to a Ballet School in Tbilisi. In 1991, she started to learn how to play the piano and guitar. In 2000, she created a musical group called SETI. In 2003, Patsatsia published her first album. In 2006, she published the single Tkvi ras apireb. In 2008, she won the musical show Wave of Hope. After that, she participated in the national selection for the Eurovision Song Contest 2008 with the song "Never Change", but did not win. In the Eurovision grand final of that same year, she was chosen as the spokesperson to announce the results of the Georgian televote. In 2009, Patsatsia tried again to participate in the national selection for the Eurovision Song Contest 2009 with the song "Miracle", but again did not win. In 2010, she hosted Nichieri (ნიჭიერი, the Georgian version of Got Talent).

== Discography ==
- 2003: Tkvi ras apireb
- 2004: Momavlis gza
- 2006: Simartlis droa
- 2007: Ar gacherde
- 2008: Never Change
- 2009: Miracle
