= Nino Chkheidze =

Georgian singer and songwriter

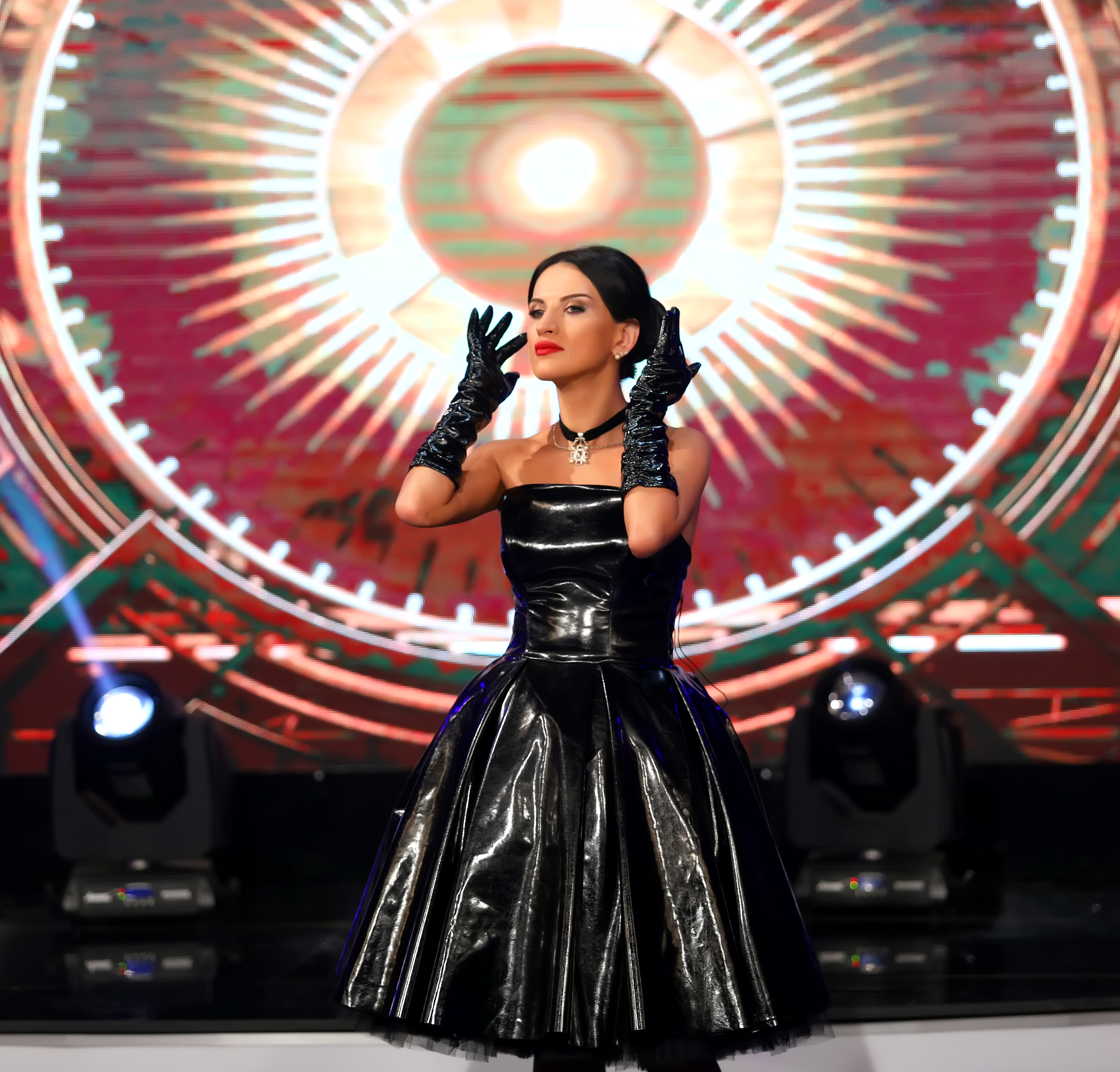

Background information
- Born: 6 June 1981 (age 44); Tbilisi, Georgian SSR, Soviet Union
- Origin: Georgia
- Genres: Pop, R&B, folk
- Occupation(s): Singer, songwriter
- Instrument: Vocals
- Years active: 1999–present
- Website: ninochkheidze.ge

Nino Chkheidze (Georgian: ნინო ჩხეიძე; 6 June 1981) is a Georgian singer, songwriter, and hat designer. Chkheidze's music combines elements of Georgian folk, ethnic, and pop music.

== Life and career ==
Nino Chkheidze was born to Gia Chkheidze, an economist, and Ketino Kochiashvili, a mathematician. She attended music school in Tbilisi, graduating in 1999. That same year, Chkheidze released her first song, "My Heart Is Yours." She then studied journalism at Tbilisi State University. In 2006, Chkheidze released her first album, consisting of 12 old classical Georgian songs. Her second album, Uzhhenod (უშენოდ), was released in 2007. In 2008, she released two albums: Vitsi Gikvarvar (ვიცი გიყვარვარ) and a best-of album (საუკეთესო სიმღერების კრებული). That same year, she also opened her own recording studio, "Nio Studio." In 2012, she was selected by Imedi TV as one of the judges for the show "The Voice Georgia." From 2014 to 2017, Chkheidze was a producer of the television show "Fanoghi of Georgia." In 2016, she founded the fashion brand "NIO," where she produces her own hat designs. In 2018, she participated in the television show "Dancing Stars" and founded the "NIO Band."

Chkheidze is married to Giorgi Korakhashvili. The couple have one daughter.

== Discography ==
=== Albums ===
- 2007: Uzhhenod (Studio Tbilisi)
- 2008: Vitsi Gikvarvar
- 2008: The Best Songs Collection
- 2010: Ghamkhare
- 2011: I love you to the sky
- 2013: Nino Chkheidze
- 2015: Nino Chkheidze mp3
- 2015: Nino Chkheidze Duets
- 2017: The Best
- 2018: The R.E.D.
- 2020: Guls Ukharia
- 2021: The Best II
- 2022: Modi Modi

=== Singles ===
- 2020: Mikvarda
- 2022: Dabadebis Dge
