= Councilman body =

Eosinophilic globule of apoptotic hepatocyte cell fragments

Councilman body (upper-right) and ballooning degeneration (centre-left). H&E stain.

In pathology, a Councilman body, also known as a Councilman hyaline body, is an eosinophilic globule of apoptotic hepatocyte cell fragments (an apoptotic body). Ultimately, the fragments are taken up by macrophages or adjacent parenchymal cells. They are found in the liver of individuals suffering from acute viral hepatitis, yellow fever, and other viral syndromes.

== Apoptotic bodies ==
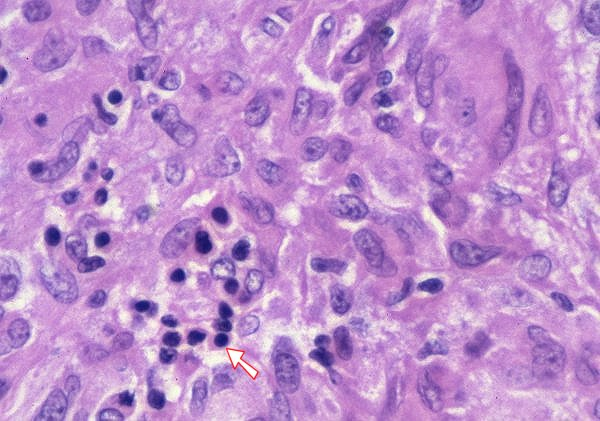
Apoptotic body

When referring to Councilman bodies, it is crucial to understand the term "apoptotic body". Apoptotic bodies are a peculiar type of extracellular vesicle that are left over pieces from cells that have undergone apoptosis, a form of programmed cell death. The dying cells release varying amounts of closed, subcellular pieces that are often large for extracellular vesicles that may include forms of protein, DNA and RNA fragments, chromatin, lipids, cytosol, and organelles.

== Associated conditions ==
=== Yellow fever ===
Councilman bodies were first identified in yellow fever, which characteristically shows a midzonal hepatic necrosis on biopsy. Similar inclusions are observed in other viral hemorrhagic fevers and all of the viral hepatitides. Liver biopsy of acute viral hepatitis shows panlobular lymphocytic infiltrates with ballooning hepatocytes.

=== Viral hepatitis ===
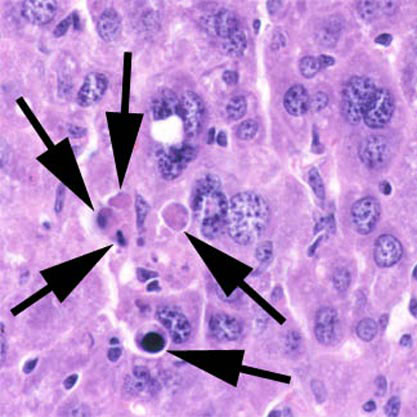
Apoptosis of the liver of a mouse

Hepatocytes are the liver's primary parenchymal cells, forming 80% of the liver's mass and 60% of its cells. They are round in shape and contain a nucleus and organelles that contribute to metabolic and secretory functions. Hepatocytes also play a pivotal role in liver inflammation. Councilman bodies are often named for the hepatocytes undergoing apoptosis, which occurs in the portal tracts and lobules of the liver. Inflammation of the liver is caused by the cytotoxic killing of hepatocytes, or Councilman bodies. Eventually, this inflammation leads to liver damage in viral hepatitis. Through the use of double immune fluorescence methods, HBsAg and/or HBcAg (hepatitis B core antigen) are present in Councilman bodies in the liver.

== Eponym ==
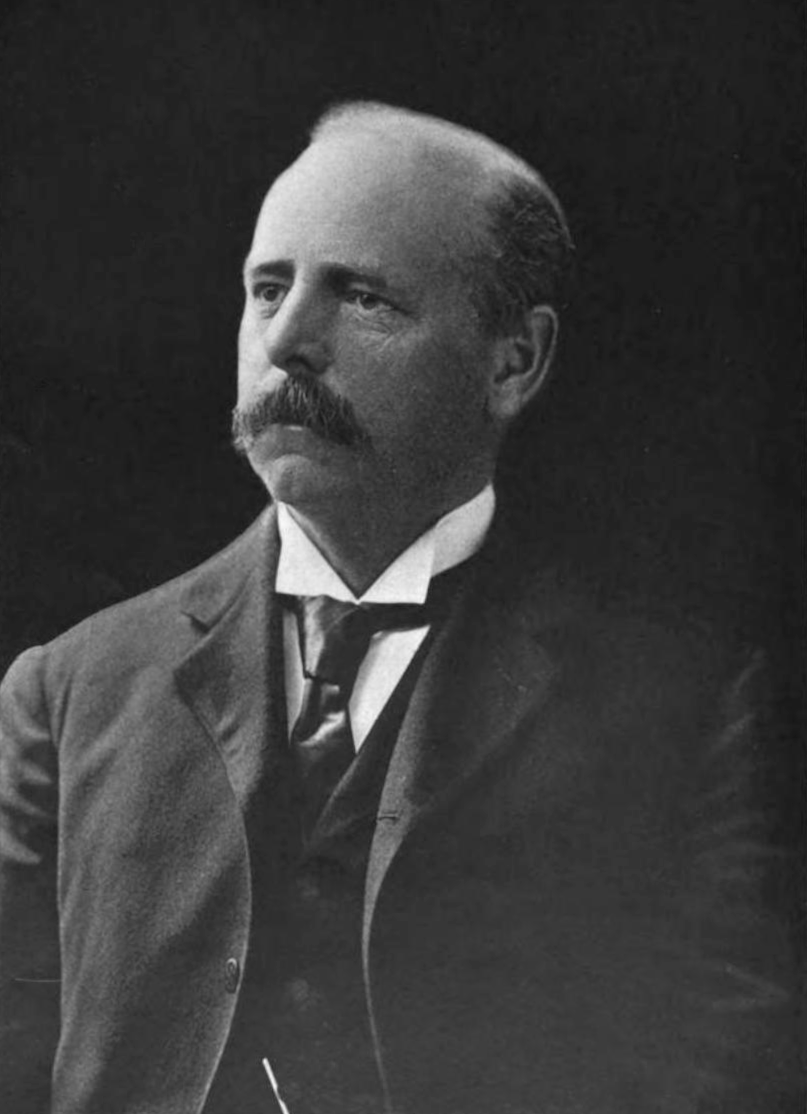
William Thomas Councilman

Councilman bodies are named after American pathologist William Thomas Councilman (1854–1933), who discovered them.

== Discovery ==
With a bright field microscope, Councilman described typical, discrete, necrotic lesions in human hepatic cells of those infected with yellow fever. He noted that the bodies appeared to be red in hematoxylin and eosin-stained sections of hepatic tissue, while being circumscribed, varying in size, round or irregular shape, and having numerous vacuoles of different sizes.

== Causes ==
While Councilman bodies are identified in patients with yellow fever, the yellow fever virus does not cause the bodies. Yellow fever virus particles are not found in Councilman bodies under an electron microscope, agreeing with William Thomas Councilman's suggestion. It is not possible to find membranous components or lipid droplets within the bodies. This means that Councilman bodies appear to be formed from general toxemia, rather than from the viral particles.

== Documented cases and studies ==
=== Primates - yellow fever ===
In Rio de Janeiro, numerous wild primates died during an outbreak of yellow fever. All deceased primates were submitted for necropsy and yellow fever diagnosis for the Brazilian Ministry of Health's surveillance program. 56 out of 1,304 primates tested positive for yellow fever from liver samples using real time RT-PCR diagnostics. The official diagnosis included that the liver contained hepatocellular degeneration and necrosis with Councilman bodies and intracytoplasmic lipid.

=== Male adult - yellow fever ===
Hideyo Noguchi was born in 1876 in Aizu. Throughout his life, he became a well known scientist in Japan for his work in investigating yellow fever between 1918 and 1924 in Central and South America. He believed that Leptospira icteroides was the cause of yellow fever. However, his theory was discredited in 1927. Unfortunately, he developed yellow fever from a laboratory infection and died in Africa at 51 years old. His theorized vaccine against L. icteroides was ineffective for preventing yellow fever. His liver samples showed Councilman bodies in the hepatocytes in their intermediate zones that revealed eosinophilic cytoplasmic coagulation.

=== Multiple samples viewed with electron microscope ===
Five adults with hepatitis, two children with hepatoma, and three mongrel dogs provided tissue samples for study have an auxiliary liver transplant into the pelvis. The tissues were fixed immediately in ice-cold 1% osmium tetroxide, buffered with veronal acetate, and sucrose. Sections were cut, stained with lead hydroxide or citrate, and viewed under an electron microscope. The results showed the both canine and human tissue were intact, but altered hepatocytes were observed. The doctors declared that councilman bodies were observed as vacuolated acidophilic bodies within the tissue samples.

=== LEC rats - acute hepatitis and hepatoma ===
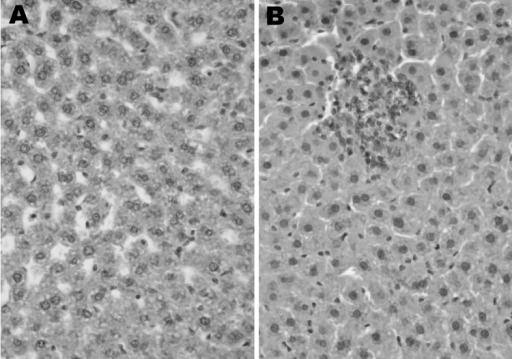
Rat liver comparison between normal (A) vs. acute hepatitis (B) cells

An LEC rat, an inbred mutant rat, which suffered from hereditary hepatitis, was examined for elucidation during the development of the acute phase of hepatitis by quantitative analyses of the liver and laboratory data on serum enzymes. The progression of the acute hepatitis in the LEC rat was observed, showing only a few enlarged hepatocytes and Councilman bodies in its early life. These appeared around 8 weeks of age without any clinic signs of hepatitis. The acute phase of hepatitis started with a major increase of Councilman bodies, large nuclei, and hepatocytes in mitosis in the liver around 3-4 weeks before the onset of fulminant hepatitis. From these observations, three stages of progression of acute hepatitis were proposed in the LEC rat.

== See also ==
- Ballooning degeneration
- Feathery degeneration
- Mallory body
