= Hepatitis B =

Human viral infection

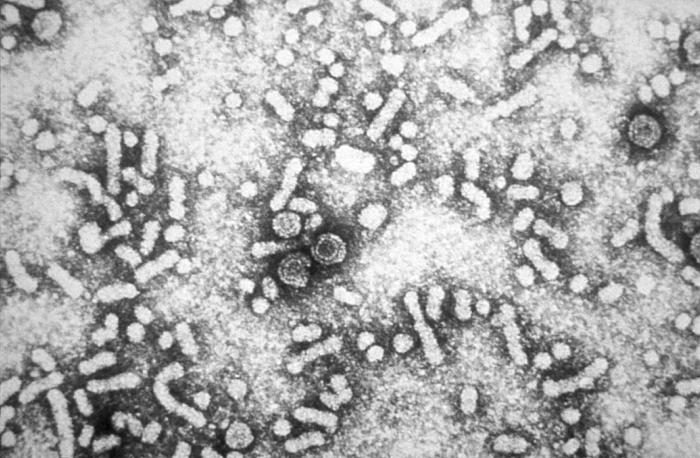
- Electron micrograph of hepatitis B virus
- Specialty: Infectious disease, gastroenterology
- Symptoms: None, yellowish skin, tiredness, dark urine, abdominal pain
- Complications: Cirrhosis, liver cancer
- Usual onset: Symptoms may take up to 6 months to appear
- Duration: Short or long term
- Causes: Hepatitis B virus spread by some body fluids
- Risk factors: Intravenous drug use, sexual intercourse, dialysis, living with an infected person
- Diagnostic method: Blood tests
- Prevention: Hepatitis B vaccine
- Treatment: Antiviral medication (tenofovir, interferon), liver transplantation
- Frequency: 296 million (2019)
- Deaths: 820,000 resulting from hepatitis B (2019)

Hepatitis B is an infectious disease caused by the hepatitis B virus (HBV) that affects the liver; it is a type of viral hepatitis. It can cause both acute and chronic infection.

Many people have no symptoms after exposure. For others, symptoms may appear 30 to 180 days after exposure and can include a rapid onset of sickness with nausea, vomiting, yellowish skin, fatigue, yellow urine, and abdominal pain. Symptoms during acute infection typically last for a few weeks, though some people may feel sick for up to six months. Deaths resulting from acute stage HBV infections are rare. An HBV infection lasting longer than six months is usually considered chronic. The likelihood of developing chronic hepatitis B is higher for those who are infected with HBV at a younger age. About 90% of those infected during or shortly after birth develop chronic hepatitis B, while less than 10% of those infected after the age of five develop chronic cases. Most of those with chronic disease have no symptoms; however, cirrhosis and liver cancer eventually develop in about 25% of those with chronic HBV.

The virus is transmitted by exposure to infectious blood or body fluids. In areas where the disease is common, infection around the time of birth or from contact with other people's blood during childhood are the most frequent methods by which hepatitis B is acquired. In areas where the disease is rare, intravenous drug use and sexual intercourse are the most frequent routes of infection. Other risk factors include working in healthcare, blood transfusions, dialysis, living with an infected person, travel in countries with high infection rates, and living in group living situations. Tattooing and acupuncture led to a significant number of cases in the 1980s; however, this has become less common with improved sterilization. The hepatitis B viruses cannot be spread by holding hands, sharing eating utensils, kissing, hugging, coughing, sneezing, or breastfeeding. The infection can be diagnosed 30 to 60 days after exposure. The diagnosis is usually confirmed by testing the blood for parts of the virus and for antibodies against the virus. It is one of five main hepatitis viruses: A, B, C, D, and E. During an initial infection, care is based on a person's symptoms. In those who develop chronic disease, antiviral medication such as tenofovir or interferon may be useful; however, these drugs are expensive. Liver transplantation is sometimes recommended for cases of cirrhosis or hepatocellular carcinoma.

Hepatitis B infection has been preventable by vaccination since 1982. As of 2022, the hepatitis B vaccine is between 98% and 100% effective in preventing infection. The vaccine is administered in several doses; after an initial dose, two or three more vaccine doses are required at a later time for full effect. The World Health Organization (WHO) recommends infants receive the vaccine within 24 hours after birth when possible. National programs have made the hepatitis B vaccine available for infants in 190 countries as of the end of 2021. To further prevent infection, the WHO recommends testing all donated blood for hepatitis B before using it for transfusion. Using antiviral prophylaxis to prevent mother-to-child transmission is also recommended, as is following safe sex practices, including the use of condoms. In 2016, the WHO set a goal of eliminating viral hepatitis as a threat to global public health by 2030. Achieving this goal would require the development of therapeutic treatments to cure chronic hepatitis B, as well as preventing its transmission and using vaccines to prevent new infections.

An estimated 296 million people, or 3.8% of the global population, had chronic hepatitis B infections as of 2019. Another 1.5 million developed acute infections that year, and 820,000 deaths occurred as a result of HBV. Cirrhosis and liver cancer are responsible for most HBV-related deaths. The disease is most prevalent in Africa (affecting 7.5% of the continent's population) and in the Western Pacific region (5.9%). Infection rates are 1.5% in Europe and 0.5% in the Americas. According to some estimates, about a third of the world's population has been infected with hepatitis B at one point in their lives. Hepatitis B was originally known as "serum hepatitis".

== Signs and symptoms ==
Acute infection with hepatitis B virus is associated with acute viral hepatitis, an illness that begins with general ill-health, loss of appetite, nausea, vomiting, body aches, mild fever, and dark urine, and then progresses to development of jaundice. The illness lasts for a few weeks and then gradually improves in most affected people. A few people may have a more severe form of liver disease known as fulminant hepatic failure and may die as a result. The infection may be entirely asymptomatic and may go unrecognized.

Chronic infection with hepatitis B virus may be asymptomatic or may be associated with chronic inflammation of the liver (chronic hepatitis), leading to cirrhosis over a period of several years. This type of infection dramatically increases the incidence of hepatocellular carcinoma (HCC; liver cancer). Across Europe, hepatitis B and C cause approximately 50% of hepatocellular carcinomas. Chronic carriers are encouraged to avoid consuming alcohol as it increases their risk for cirrhosis and liver cancer. Hepatitis B virus has been linked to the development of membranous glomerulonephritis (MGN).

Symptoms outside of the liver are present in 1–10% of HBV-infected people and include serum-sickness–like syndrome, acute necrotizing vasculitis (polyarteritis nodosa), membranous glomerulonephritis, and papular acrodermatitis of childhood (Gianotti–Crosti syndrome). The serum-sickness–like syndrome occurs in the setting of acute hepatitis B, often preceding the onset of jaundice. The clinical features are fever, skin rash, and polyarteritis. The symptoms often subside shortly after the onset of jaundice but can persist throughout the duration of acute hepatitis B. About 30–50% of people with acute necrotizing vasculitis (polyarteritis nodosa) are HBV carriers. HBV-associated nephropathy has been described in adults but is more common in children. Membranous glomerulonephritis is the most common form. Other immune-mediated hematological disorders, such as essential mixed cryoglobulinemia and aplastic anemia, have been described as part of the extrahepatic manifestations of HBV infection, but their association is not as well-defined; therefore, they probably should not be considered etiologically linked to HBV.

== Cause ==
=== Transmission ===
Transmission of hepatitis B virus results from exposure to infectious blood or body fluids containing blood. HBV is 50 to 100 times more infectious than human immunodeficiency virus (HIV). HBV can be transmitted through several routes of infection. In vertical transmission, HBV is passed from mother to child (MTCT) during childbirth. Without intervention, a mother who is positive for HBsAg has a 20% risk of passing the infection to her offspring at the time of birth. This risk is as high as 90% if the mother is also positive for HBeAg.

Early life horizontal transmission can occur through bites, lesions, certain sanitary habits, or other contact with secretions. Though HBV is found in virtually every bodily secretion and excretion, only blood, semen, and vaginal secretions have been shown to be infective. Adult horizontal transmission is known to occur through sexual contact, blood transfusions and transfusion with other human blood products, re-use of contaminated needles and syringes. Breastfeeding after proper immunoprophylaxis does not appear to contribute to mother-to-child-transmission (MTCT) of HBV.

=== Virology ===
==== Structure ====
The structure of hepatitis B virus

Hepatitis B virus (HBV) is a member of the hepadnavirus family. The virus particle (virion) consists of an outer lipid envelope and an icosahedral nucleocapsid core composed of core protein. These virions are 30–42 nm in diameter. The nucleocapsid encloses the viral DNA and a DNA polymerase that has reverse transcriptase activity. The outer envelope contains embedded proteins that are involved in viral binding of, and entry into, susceptible cells. The virus is one of the smallest enveloped animal viruses. The 42 nm virions, which are capable of infecting liver cells known as hepatocytes, are referred to as "Dane particles". In addition to the Dane particles, filamentous and spherical bodies lacking a core can be found in the serum of infected individuals. These particles are not infectious and are composed of the lipid and protein that forms part of the surface of the virion, which is called the surface antigens (HBsAg), and is produced in excess during the life cycle of the virus.

==== Genome ====
The genome organisation of HBV. The genes overlap.

The genome of HBV is made of circular DNA, but it is unusual because the DNA is not fully double-stranded. One end of the full length strand is linked to the HBV DNA polymerase. The genome is 3020–3320 nucleotides long (for the full-length strand) and 1700–2800 nucleotides long (for the short length-strand). The negative-sense (non-coding) is complementary to the viral mRNA. The viral DNA is found in the nucleus soon after infection of the cell. The partially double-stranded DNA is rendered fully double-stranded by completion of the (+) sense strand and removal of a protein molecule from the (−) sense strand and a short sequence of RNA from the (+) sense strand. Non-coding bases are removed from the ends of the (−) sense strand and the ends are rejoined. There are four known genes encoded by the genome, called C, X, P, and S. The core protein is coded for by gene C (HBcAg), and its start codon is preceded by an upstream in-frame AUG start codon from which the pre-core protein is produced. HBeAg is produced by proteolytic processing of the pre-core protein. In some rare strains of the virus known as hepatitis B virus precore mutants, no HBeAg is present. The DNA polymerase is encoded by gene P. Gene S is the gene that codes for the surface antigen (HBsAg). The HBsAg gene is one long open reading frame but contains three in frame "start" (ATG) codons that divide the gene into three sections, pre-S1, pre-S2, and S. Because of the multiple start codons, polypeptides of three different sizes called large (the order from surface to the inside: pre-S1, pre-S2, and S ), middle (pre-S2, S), and small (S) are produced. There is a myristyl group, which plays an important role in infection, on the amino-terminal end of the preS1 part of the large (L) protein. In addition to that, N terminus of the L protein have virus attachment and capsid binding sites. Because of that, the N termini of half of the L protein molecules are positioned outside the membrane and the other half positioned inside the membrane.

The function of the protein coded for by gene X is not fully understood but it is associated with the development of liver cancer. It stimulates genes that promote cell growth and inactivates growth regulating molecules.

==== Pathogenesis ====
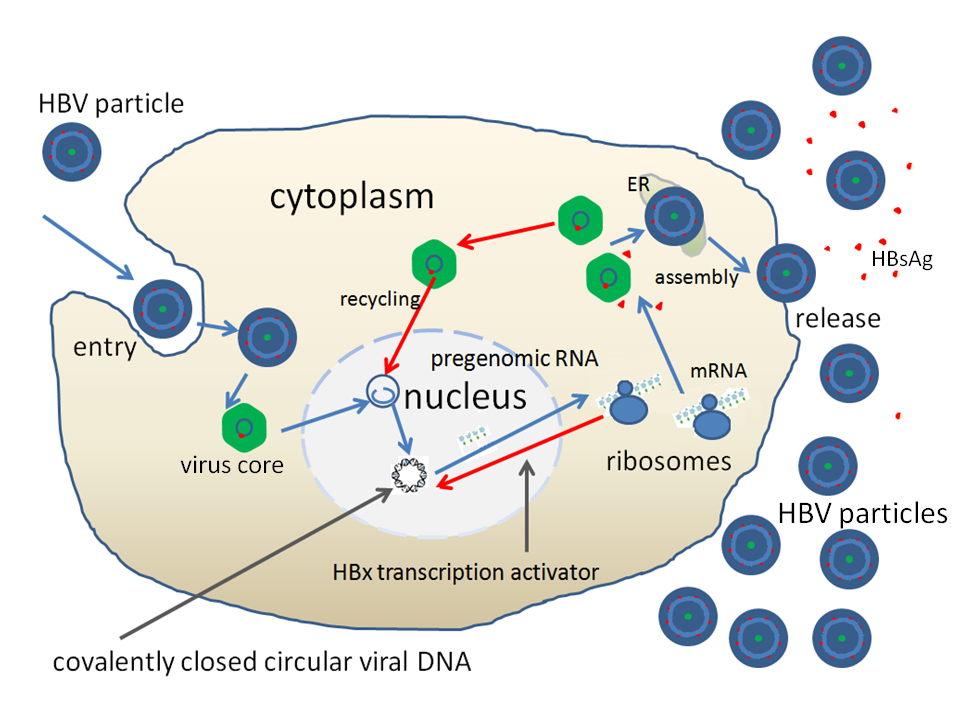
Hepatitis B virus replication

The life cycle of hepatitis B virus is complex. Hepatitis B is one of a few known pararetroviruses: non-retroviruses that still use reverse transcription in their replication process. The virus gains entry into the cell by binding to NTCP on the surface and being endocytosed. Because the virus multiplies via RNA made by a host enzyme, the viral genomic DNA has to be transferred to the cell nucleus by host proteins called chaperones. The partially double-stranded, circular viral DNA is then made fully double stranded by HBV DNA polymerase, transforming the genome into covalently closed circular DNA (cccDNA). This cccDNA serves as a template for transcription of four viral mRNAs by host RNA polymerase. The largest mRNA, (which is longer than the viral genome), is used to make the new copies of the genome and to make the capsid core protein and the viral DNA polymerase. These four viral transcripts undergo additional processing and go on to form progeny virions that are released from the cell or returned to the nucleus and re-cycled to produce even more copies. The long mRNA is then transported back to the cytoplasm where the virion P protein (the DNA polymerase) synthesizes DNA via its reverse transcriptase activity. In addition to its nuclear cccDNA reservoir, fragments of hepatitis B virus DNA can integrate into the host genome, particularly in cases of chronic infection, and this integration is implicated in the development of liver cancer.

==== Serotypes and genotypes ====
The virus is divided into four major serotypes (adr, adw, ayr, ayw) based on antigenic epitopes presented on its envelope proteins, and into eight major genotypes (A–H). The genotypes have a distinct geographical distribution and are used in tracing the evolution and transmission of the virus. Differences between genotypes affect the disease severity, course and likelihood of complications, and response to treatment and possibly vaccination. There are two other genotypes I and J but they are not universally accepted as of 2015. The diversity of genotypes is not shown equally in the world. For example, A, D, and E genotypes have been seen in Africa prevalently while B and C genotypes are observed in Asia as widespread.

Genotypes differ by at least 8% of their sequence and were first reported in 1988 when six were initially described (A–F). Two further types have since been described (G and H). Most genotypes are now divided into subgenotypes with distinct properties.

== Mechanisms ==
Hepatitis B virus primarily interferes with the functions of the liver by replicating in hepatocytes. A functional receptor is NTCP. There is evidence that the receptor in the closely related duck hepatitis B virus is carboxypeptidase D. The virions bind to the host cell via the preS domain of the viral surface antigen and are subsequently internalized by endocytosis. HBV-preS-specific receptors are expressed primarily on hepatocytes; however, viral DNA and proteins have also been detected in extrahepatic sites, suggesting that cellular receptors for HBV may also exist on extrahepatic cells.

During HBV infection, the host immune response causes both hepatocellular damage and viral clearance. Although the innate immune response does not play a significant role in these processes, the adaptive immune response, in particular virus-specific cytotoxic T lymphocytes (CTLs), contributes to most of the liver injury associated with HBV infection. CTLs eliminate HBV infection by killing infected cells and producing antiviral cytokines, which are then used to purge HBV from viable hepatocytes. Although liver damage is initiated and mediated by the CTLs, antigen-nonspecific inflammatory cells can worsen CTL-induced immunopathology, and platelets activated at the site of infection may facilitate the accumulation of CTLs in the liver.

== Diagnosis ==
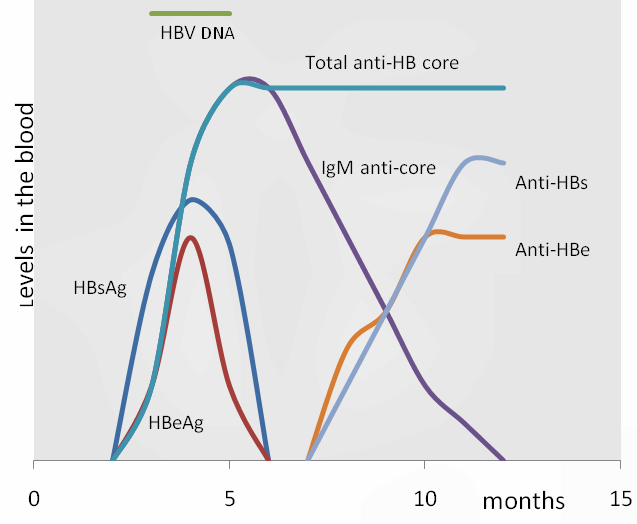
Hepatitis B viral antigens and antibodies detectable in the blood following acute infection

Hepatitis B viral antigens and antibodies detectable in the blood of a chronically infected person

The tests, called assays, for detection of hepatitis B virus infection involve serum or blood tests that detect either viral antigens (proteins produced by the virus) or antibodies produced by the host. Interpretation of these assays is complex.

The hepatitis B surface antigen (HBsAg) is most frequently used to screen for the presence of this infection. It is the first detectable viral antigen to appear during infection. However, early in an infection, this antigen may not be present and it may be undetectable later in the infection as it is being cleared by the host. The infectious virion contains an inner "core particle" enclosing viral genome. The icosahedral core particle is made of 180 or 240 copies of the core protein, alternatively known as hepatitis B core antigen, or HBcAg. During this 'window' in which the host remains infected but is successfully clearing the virus, IgM antibodies specific to the hepatitis B core antigen (anti-HBc IgM) may be the only serological evidence of disease. Therefore, most hepatitis B diagnostic panels contain HBsAg and total anti-HBc (both IgM and IgG).

Shortly after the appearance of the HBsAg, another antigen called hepatitis B e antigen (HBeAg) may appear. Traditionally, the presence of HBeAg in a host's serum is associated with much higher rates of viral replication and enhanced infectivity; however, variants of the hepatitis B virus do not produce the 'e' antigen, so this rule does not always hold true. Overall, only a minority of diagnosed cases of hepatitis B have been found to feature the 'e' antigen. During the natural course of an infection, the HBeAg may be cleared, and antibodies to the 'e' antigen (anti-HBe) will arise immediately afterwards. This conversion is usually associated with a dramatic decline in viral replication.

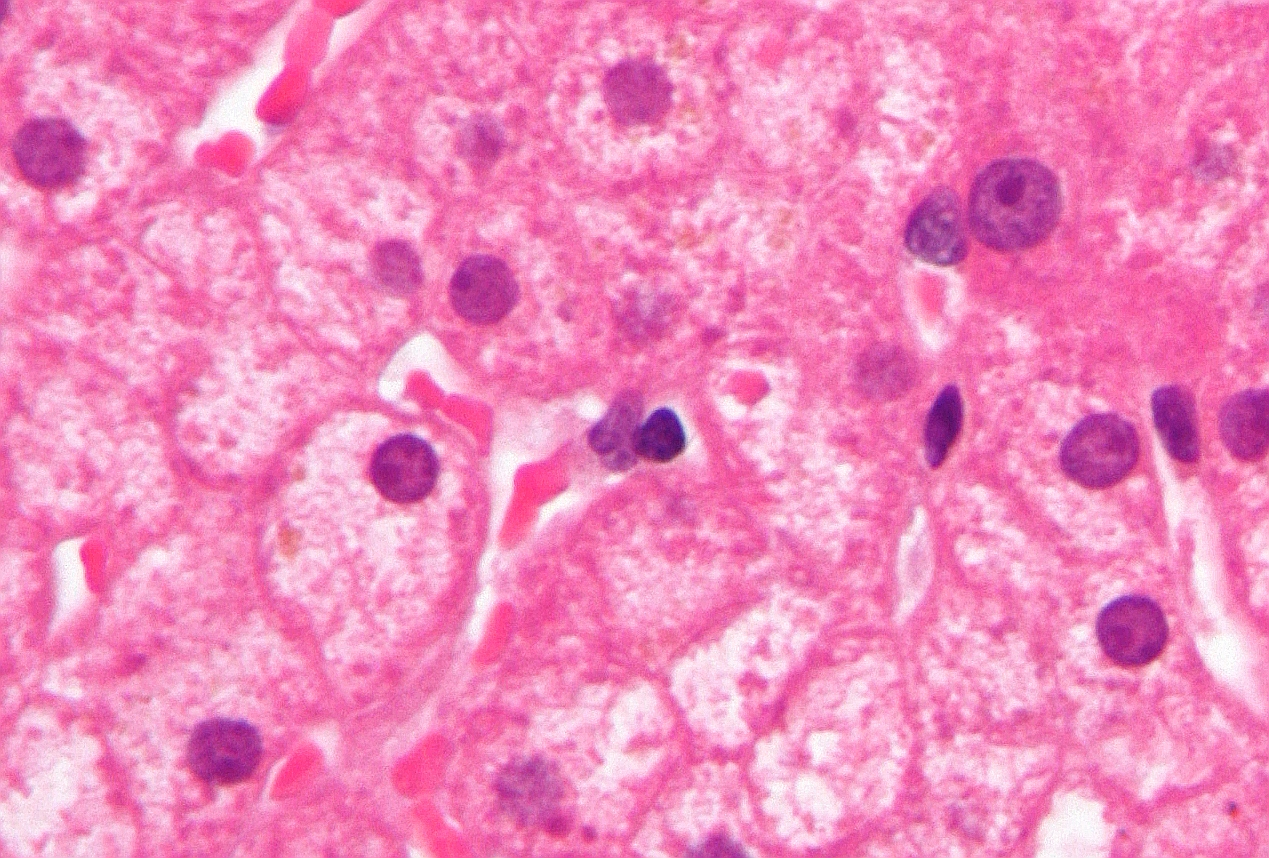
Ground glass hepatocytes as seen in a chronic hepatitis B liver biopsy. H&E stain

If the host is able to clear the infection, eventually the HBsAg will become undetectable and will be followed by Immunoglobulin G|IgG antibodies to the hepatitis B surface antigen and core antigen (anti-HBs and anti HBc IgG). The time between the removal of the HBsAg and the appearance of anti-HBs is called the window period. A person negative for HBsAg but positive for anti-HBs either has cleared an infection or has been vaccinated previously.

Individuals who remain HBsAg positive for at least six months are considered to be hepatitis B carriers. Carriers of the virus may have chronic hepatitis B, which would be reflected by elevated serum alanine aminotransferase (ALT) levels and inflammation of the liver, if they are in the immune clearance phase of chronic infection. Carriers who have seroconverted to HBeAg negative status, in particular those who acquired the infection as adults, have very little viral multiplication and hence may be at little risk of long-term complications or of transmitting infection to others. However, it is rare but possible for individuals to enter an "immune escape" with reactivated HBeAg-negative hepatitis, once again showing signs of disease despite previous complete immune system control. This results in high viral replication and faster progression towards cirrhosis, compared to the typical course of disease. These individuals will typically have detectable anti-HBe antibodies, but no detectable HBeAg in the serum.

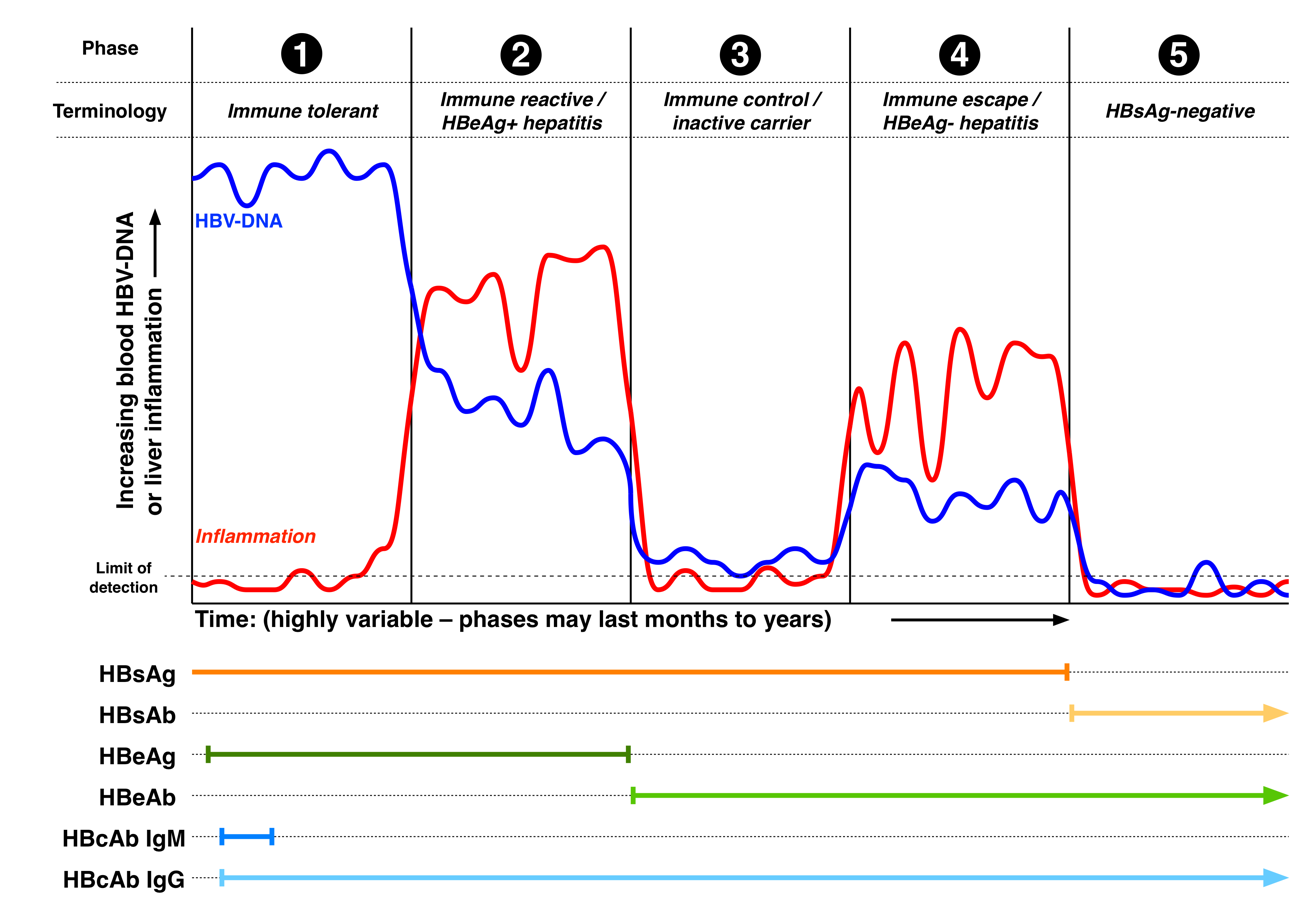
The five phases of chronic hepatitis B infection as defined by European Association for the Study of the Liver

PCR tests have been developed to detect and measure the amount of HBV DNA, called the viral load, in clinical specimens. These tests are used to assess a person's infection status and to monitor treatment. Individuals with high viral loads, characteristically have ground glass hepatocytes on biopsy.

== Prevention ==
=== Vaccine ===
Vaccines for the prevention of hepatitis B have been routinely recommended for babies since 1991 in the United States. The first dose is generally recommended within a day of birth. The hepatitis B vaccine was the first vaccine capable of preventing cancer, specifically liver cancer.

Most vaccines are given in three doses over a course of days. A protective response to the vaccine is defined as an anti-HBs antibody concentration of at least 10 mIU/ml in the recipient's serum. The vaccine is more effective in children and 95 percent of those vaccinated have protective levels of antibody. This drops to around 90% at 40 years of age and to around 75 percent in those over 60 years. The protection afforded by vaccination is long lasting even after antibody levels fall below 10 mIU/ml. For newborns of HBsAg-positive mothers: hepatitis B vaccine alone, hepatitis B immunoglobulin alone, or the combination of vaccine plus hepatitis B immunoglobulin, all prevent hepatitis B occurrence. Furthermore, the combination of vaccine plus hepatitis B immunoglobulin is superior to vaccine alone. This combination prevents HBV transmission around the time of birth in 86% to 99% of cases.

Tenofovir given in the second or third trimester can reduce the risk of mother to child transmission by 77% when combined with hepatitis B immunoglobulin and the hepatitis B vaccine, especially for pregnant women with high hepatitis B virus DNA levels. However, there is not sufficient evidence that the administration of hepatitis B immunoglobulin alone during pregnancy, might reduce transmission rates to the newborn infant. No randomized control trial has been conducted to assess the effects of hepatitis B vaccine during pregnancy for preventing infant infection.

All those with a risk of exposure to body fluids such as blood should be vaccinated, if not already. Testing to verify effective immunization is recommended and further doses of vaccine are given to those who are not sufficiently immunized.

In 10- to 22-year follow-up studies there were no cases of hepatitis B among those with a normal immune system who were vaccinated. Only rare chronic infections have been documented. Vaccination is particularly recommended for high risk groups including: health workers, people with chronic kidney failure, and men who have sex with men.

Both types of the hepatitis B vaccine, the plasma-derived vaccine (PDV) and the recombinant vaccine (RV) are of similar effectiveness in preventing infection in both healthcare workers and chronic kidney failure groups. One difference was noticed among the health worker group: the RV intramuscular route was significantly more effective compared with the RV intradermal route of administration.

=== Other ===
In assisted reproductive technology, sperm washing is not necessary for males with hepatitis B to prevent transmission, unless the female partner has not been effectively vaccinated. In females with hepatitis B, the risk of transmission from mother to child with IVF is no different from the risk in spontaneous conception.

Those at high risk of infection should be tested as there is effective treatment for those who have the disease. Groups that screening is recommended for include those who have not been vaccinated and one of the following: people from areas of the world where hepatitis B occurs in more than 2%, those with HIV, intravenous drug users, men who have sex with men, and those who live with someone with hepatitis B. Screening during pregnancy is recommended in the United States.

== Treatment ==
Acute hepatitis B infection does not usually require treatment and most adults clear the infection spontaneously. Early antiviral treatment may be required in fewer than 1% of people, whose infection takes a very aggressive course (fulminant hepatitis) or who are immunocompromised. On the other hand, treatment of chronic infection may be necessary to reduce the risk of cirrhosis and liver cancer. Chronically infected individuals with persistently elevated serum alanine aminotransferase, a marker of liver damage, and HBV DNA levels are candidates for therapy. Treatment lasts from six months to a year, depending on medication and genotype. Treatment duration when medication is taken by mouth, however, is more variable and usually longer than one year.

Although none of the available medications can clear the infection, they can stop the virus from replicating, thus minimizing liver damage. As of 2024, there are seven medications licensed for the treatment of hepatitis B infection in the United States. These include antiviral medications lamivudine, adefovir, tenofovir disoproxil, tenofovir alafenamide, telbivudine, and entecavir, and the two immune system modulators interferon alpha-2a and PEGylated interferon alpha-2a. In 2015, the World Health Organization recommended tenofovir or entecavir as first-line agents. Those with current cirrhosis are in most need of treatment.

In 2026, Bepirovirsen was shown to essentially cure one in five patients with chronic hepatitis B. Hou and colleagues reported encouraging results from two randomized controlled trials evaluating bepirovirsen, an antisense oligonucleotide, in patients with chronic hepatitis B infection without cirrhosis who were receiving nucleos(t)ide analogue therapy. Although these antiviral agents effectively suppress viral replication, they rarely eradicate infection. The primary endpoint was sustained clearance of circulating hepatitis B viral DNA 24 weeks after completion of treatment. Approximately 20% of participants achieved this endpoint, suggesting that bepirovirsen may enable sustained viral clearance and represents a potential step toward a functional cure for a subset of patients.

The use of interferon, which requires injections daily or thrice weekly, has been supplanted by long-acting PEGylated interferon, which is injected only once weekly. However, some individuals are much more likely to respond than others, and this might be because of the genotype of the infecting virus or the person's heredity. The treatment reduces viral replication in the liver, thereby reducing the viral load (the amount of virus particles as measured in the blood). Response to treatment differs between the genotypes. Interferon treatment may produce an e antigen seroconversion rate of 37% in genotype A but only a 6% seroconversion in type D. Genotype B has similar seroconversion rates to type A while type C seroconverts only in 15% of cases. Sustained e antigen loss after treatment is ~45% in types A and B but only 25–30% in types C and D.

It seems unlikely that the disease will be eliminated by 2030, the goal set in 2016 by WHO. However, progress is being made in developing therapeutic treatments. In 2010, the Hepatitis B Foundation reported that 3 preclinical and 11 clinical-stage drugs were under development, based on largely similar mechanisms. In 2020, they reported that there were 17 preclinical- and 32 clinical-stage drugs under development, using diverse mechanisms.

== Prognosis ==
Estimate of disability-adjusted life year for hepatitis B per 100,000 inhabitants as of 2004: no data <10 10–20 20–40 40–60 60–80 80–100 / 100–125 125–150 150–200 200–250 250–500 >500

Hepatitis B virus infection may be either acute (self-limiting) or chronic (long-standing). Persons with self-limiting infection clear the infection spontaneously within weeks to months.

Children are less likely than adults to clear the infection. More than 95% of people who become infected as adults or older children will stage a full recovery and develop protective immunity to the virus. However, this drops to 30% for younger children, and only 5% of newborns that acquire the infection from their mother at birth will clear the infection. This population has a 40% lifetime risk of death from cirrhosis or hepatocellular carcinoma. Of those infected between the age of one to six, 70% will clear the infection.

Hepatitis D (HDV) can occur only with a concomitant hepatitis B infection, because HDV uses the HBV surface antigen to form a capsid. Co-infection with hepatitis D increases the risk of liver cirrhosis and liver cancer. Polyarteritis nodosa is more common in people with hepatitis B infection.

=== Cirrhosis ===
A number of different tests are available to determine the degree of cirrhosis present. Transient elastography (FibroScan) is the test of choice, but it is expensive. Aspartate aminotransferase to platelet ratio index may be used when cost is an issue.

=== Reactivation ===
Hepatitis B virus DNA remains in the body after infection, and in some people, including those that do not have detectable HBsAg, the disease recurs. Although rare, reactivation is seen most often following alcohol or drug use, or in people with impaired immunity due to treatment with immunosuppressive medications. HBV goes through cycles of replication and non-replication. Approximately 50% of overt carriers experience acute reactivation. Males with baseline ALT of 200 UL/L are three times more likely to develop a reactivation than people with lower levels. Although reactivation can occur spontaneously, people who undergo chemotherapy have a higher risk. Immunosuppressive drugs favor increased HBV replication while inhibiting cytotoxic T cell function in the liver. The risk of reactivation varies depending on the serological profile; those with detectable HBsAg in their blood are at the greatest risk, but those with only antibodies to the core antigen are also at risk. The presence of antibodies to the surface antigen, which are considered to be a marker of immunity, does not preclude reactivation. Treatment with prophylactic antiviral drugs can prevent the serious morbidity associated with HBV disease reactivation.

== Epidemiology ==
Hepatitis B incidence (SDGs)

Approximately 254 million people had chronic HBV infection as of 2022. Another 1.2 million cases of acute HBV infection also occurred that year. Regional prevalences across the globe range from around 7.5% in Africa to 0.5% in the Americas.

The primary method of HBV transmission and the prevalence of chronic HBV infection in specific regions often correspond with one another. In populations where HBV infection rates are 8% or higher, which are classified as high prevalence, vertical transmission (usually occurring during birth) is most common, though rates of early childhood transmission can also be significant among these populations. In 2021, 19 African countries had infection rates ranging between 8-19%, placing them in the high prevalence category. High prevalence of HBV also exists in Mongolia. Sub-Saharan Africa has the highest prevalence of HBV, with rates of over 15% being present in Eritrea, Guinea, Liberia and Eswatini as of 2017.

In moderate prevalence areas where 2–7% of the population is chronically infected, the disease is predominantly spread horizontally, often among children, but also vertically. China's HBV infection rate is at the higher end of the moderate prevalence classification with an infection rate of 6.89% as of 2019. HBV prevalence in India is also moderate, with studies placing India's infection rate between 2-4%.

In Europe, most Western European countries have a low prevalence rate of under 1%, but intermediate prevalence is found in several former Eastern Bloc countries, with prevalence being highest in the Balkans region and in former USSR countries. In 2017, the highest prevalence rates in Europe were in Moldova and Albania (which had a high prevalence of 9.61% and 9% respectively) and in Romania, Kazakhstan and Turkey (which had an intermediate prevalence of 5.49%, 4.95% and 4.29% respectively). Nevertheless, the prevalence of HBV in many Eastern European countries varies considerably by generation, as the introduction of new standards of hygiene in medical settings and of the hepatitis B vaccination in the national immunization scheme for newborns in the 1990s, as was the case in Romania, significantly decreased the prevalence of HBV.

Countries with low HBV prevalence include Australia (0.9%), those in the WHO European Region (which average 1.5%), and most countries in North and South America (which average 0.28%). In the United States, an estimated 0.26% of the population was living with HBV infection as of 2018.

== History ==
Findings of HBV DNA in ancient human remains have shown that HBV has infected humans for at least ten millennia, both in Eurasia and in the Americas. This disproved the belief that hepatitis B originated in the New World and spread to Europe around 16th century. Hepatitis B virus subgenotype C4 is exclusively present in Australian aborigines, suggesting an ancient origin as much as 50,000 years old. However, analyses of ancient HBV genomes suggested that the most recent common ancestor of all known human HBV strains was dated to between 20,000 and 12,000 years ago, pointing to a more recent origin for all HBV genotypes. The evolution of HBV in humans was shown to reflect known events of human history such as the first peopling of the Americas during the late Pleistocene and the Neolithic transition in Europe. Ancient DNA studies have also showed that some ancient hepatitis viral strains still infect humans, while other strains became extinct.

The earliest record of an epidemic caused by hepatitis B virus was made by Lurman in 1885. An outbreak of smallpox occurred in Bremen in 1883 and 1,289 shipyard employees were vaccinated with lymph from other people. After several weeks, and up to eight months later, 191 of the vaccinated workers became ill with jaundice and were diagnosed with serum hepatitis. Other employees who had been inoculated with different batches of lymph remained healthy. Lurman's paper, now regarded as a classical example of an epidemiological study, proved that contaminated lymph was the source of the outbreak. Later, numerous similar outbreaks were reported following the introduction, in 1909, of hypodermic needles that were used, and, more importantly, reused, for administering Salvarsan for the treatment of syphilis.

The largest recorded outbreak of hepatitis B was the infection of up to 330,000 American soldiers during World War II. The outbreak has been blamed on a yellow fever vaccine made with contaminated human blood serum, and after receiving the vaccinations about 50,000 soldiers developed jaundice.

The virus was not discovered until 1966 when Baruch Blumberg, then working at the National Institutes of Health (NIH), discovered the Australia antigen (later known to be hepatitis B surface antigen, or HBsAg) in the blood of Aboriginal Australian people. Although a virus had been suspected since the research published by Frederick MacCallum in 1947, David Dane and others discovered the virus particle in 1970 by electron microscopy. In 1971, the FDA issued its first-ever blood supply screening order to blood banks. By the early 1980s the genome of the virus had been sequenced, and the first vaccines were being tested.

== Society and culture ==
World Hepatitis Day, observed 28 July, aims to raise global awareness of hepatitis B and hepatitis C and encourage prevention, diagnosis, and treatment. It has been led by the World Hepatitis Alliance since 2007 and in May 2010, it received global endorsement from the World Health Organization.

== See also ==
- Infectious causes of cancer
- Oncovirus
