= Wolbach =

Wolbach is a surname. Notable people with the surname include:

- Simeon Burt Wolbach (1880–1954), American pathologist, researcher, teacher, and journal editor
- S. N. Wolbach (c. 1851-1931), American businessman, banker, and politician

== See also ==
- Wolbach, Nebraska
