= Gianotti =

Gianotti is a surname. Notable people with the surname include:

- Ambrogio Gianotti (1901-1969), Italian partigiano, first priest of the Church of St. Edward
- Carol Gianotti, Australian ten-pin bowler
- Fabiola Gianotti (born 1960), Italian experimental particle physicist
- Ferdinando Gianotti (1920–1984), Italian pediatric dermatologist
- Francesco Gianotti (1881–1967), Italian architect

== See also ==
- Giannotti
- Gianotti–Crosti syndrome
