= Frank Burr Mallory =

American pathologist (1862–1941)

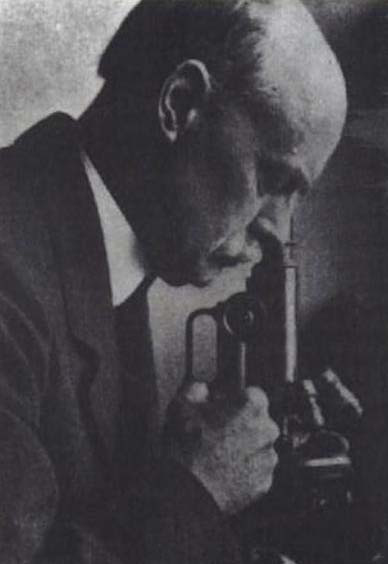
- Mallory, from the American Journal of Pathology, 1933
- Born: November 12, 1862; Cleveland, Ohio
- Died: September 27, 1941 (aged 78); Brookline, Massachusetts
- Education: Harvard College (1886); Harvard Medical School (1890)
- Known for: Mallory body
- Awards: Kober medal of the Association of American Physicians (1935)
- Scientific career
- Fields: Pathology, Oncology
- Workplaces: Boston City Hospital; Harvard Medical School

Frank Burr Mallory (November 12, 1862 – September 27, 1941) was an American pathologist at the Boston City Hospital and professor of pathology at Harvard Medical School, after whom the Mallory body is named.

== Early life and education ==
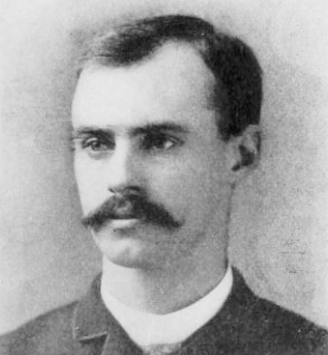
Mallory at Harvard, c. 1886

Mallory was born in Cleveland, Ohio on November 12, 1862 to George Burr and Anne (Faragher) Mallory. He received his A.B. degree from Harvard College in 1886 and his medical degree from Harvard Medical School in 1890. He became an assistant pathologist at Boston City Hospital in 1891, working under William Thomas Councilman. In 1893 Mallory traveled to Europe to train under Hans Chiari in Prague and Ernst Ziegler in Freiburg.

== Career ==
After returning to Harvard from Europe, he became an assistant professor in 1896, and associate professor of pathology in 1901. He was professor of pathology at Harvard Medical School from 1928 to 1932.

His contributions in the field of pathology included improving techniques and standardization of tissue staining; his book, written with James Homer Wright, was the standard textbook in this field. He also studied the function of histiocytes, he confirmed that the whooping cough bacillus discovered by Jules Bordet was the causative agent, and he worked on improvements in classification of tumors, particularly meningiomas, and cirrhosis of the liver.

Mallory was one of the co-founders of the American Association for Cancer Research in 1907, and served two terms as its president: in 1910-1911, and again in 1929-1930. He was president of the American Association of Pathologists and Bacteriologists in 1910, and was its treasurer from 1911 to 1940. In 1923 he became editor-in-chief of the Journal of Medical Research and, when that journal became the American Journal of Pathology in 1925, he continued to serve in the same capacity until 1940.

== Honors and awards ==
Mallory received honorary degrees from Tufts University (Sc.D., 1928) and Boston University (Sc.D., 1932), and was awarded the Kober medal in 1935 by the Association of American Physicians for outstanding service in pathology. He received the gold-headed cane award from the American Association of Pathologists and Bacteriologists in 1935.

== Personal life and Death ==
He married Persis McClain Tracy of Chautauqua, New York on August 31, 1893. They had two sons, both of whom were medical doctors and pathologists. Tracy B. Mallory was Chief of Pathology at Massachusetts General Hospital in Boston, succeeding James Homer Wright in 1926, and president of the American Association of Pathologists and Bacteriologists in 1951. His other son, George Kenneth Mallory, became professor of pathology at Boston City Hospital in 1948, and the Mallory-Weiss syndrome is named after him.

Mallory died at his home in Brookline, MA on September 27, 1941, at the age of 78.

== Legacy ==
The Pathology Department at Boston City Hospital, the Mallory Institute of Pathology, was named after him. The Mallory Institute of Pathology was operational from 1933 to 2006.
