= Ballooning degeneration =

Form of liver parenchymal cell death

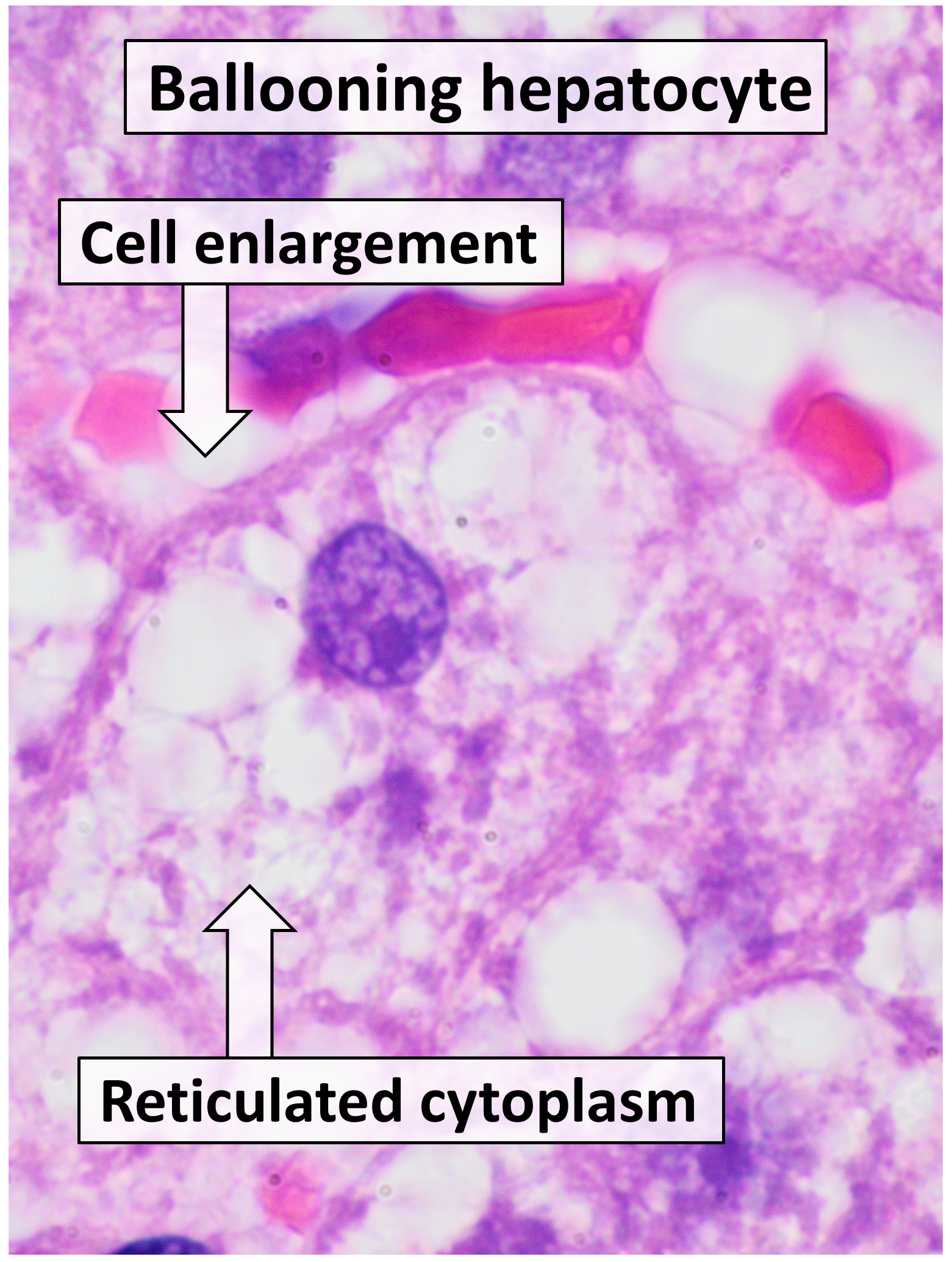
Histopathology of a ballooning hepatocyte.png, H&E stain.

Ballooning degeneration centre-left and centre-right. H&E stain. A Councilman body can also be seen in the upper-right of the section.

In histopathology, ballooning degeneration, formally ballooning degeneration of hepatocytes, is a form of liver parenchymal cell (i.e. hepatocyte) death.

The name is derived from the fact that the cells undergoing this form of cell death increase in size (balloon).

It is generally considered a form of apoptosis, and is a descriptor used in the context of inflamed fatty liver (steatohepatitis) (which may be due to obesity or alcohol), as well as viral hepatitis.

The histomorphological appearance of ballooning degeneration is not pathognomonic for steatohepatitis, but usage of the term is generally confined to the condition, i.e. in the context of other histopathological findings the label ballooning degeneration is not used for cell death with cytoplasmic clearing and cell swelling.

== Appearance ==
Ballooned cells are typically two to three times the size of adjacent hepatocytes and are characterized by a wispy cleared cytoplasm on H&E stained sections. They can be differentiated from adipocyte-like cells by their cytoplasm and nucleus; ballooned cells have their nucleus in the centre (unlike adipocyte-like cells, which have it peripherally). Also, ballooned cells have (small) pyknotic nuclei or nuclei that are undergoing karyorrhexis, i.e. in the process of disintegrating. The cytoplasm of cells undergoing ballooning degeneration is wispy/cobweb-like, while adipocyte-like cells have a clear cytoplasm or a vacuolated one.

== Relation to feathery degeneration ==
Ballooning degeneration is somewhat similar in appearance to feathery degeneration, which is associated with cholestasis, and also has cytoplasmic clearing and cell swelling.

== See also ==
- Councilman body
- Ground glass hepatocyte
- Mallory body
- Non-alcoholic fatty liver disease

== Additional images ==
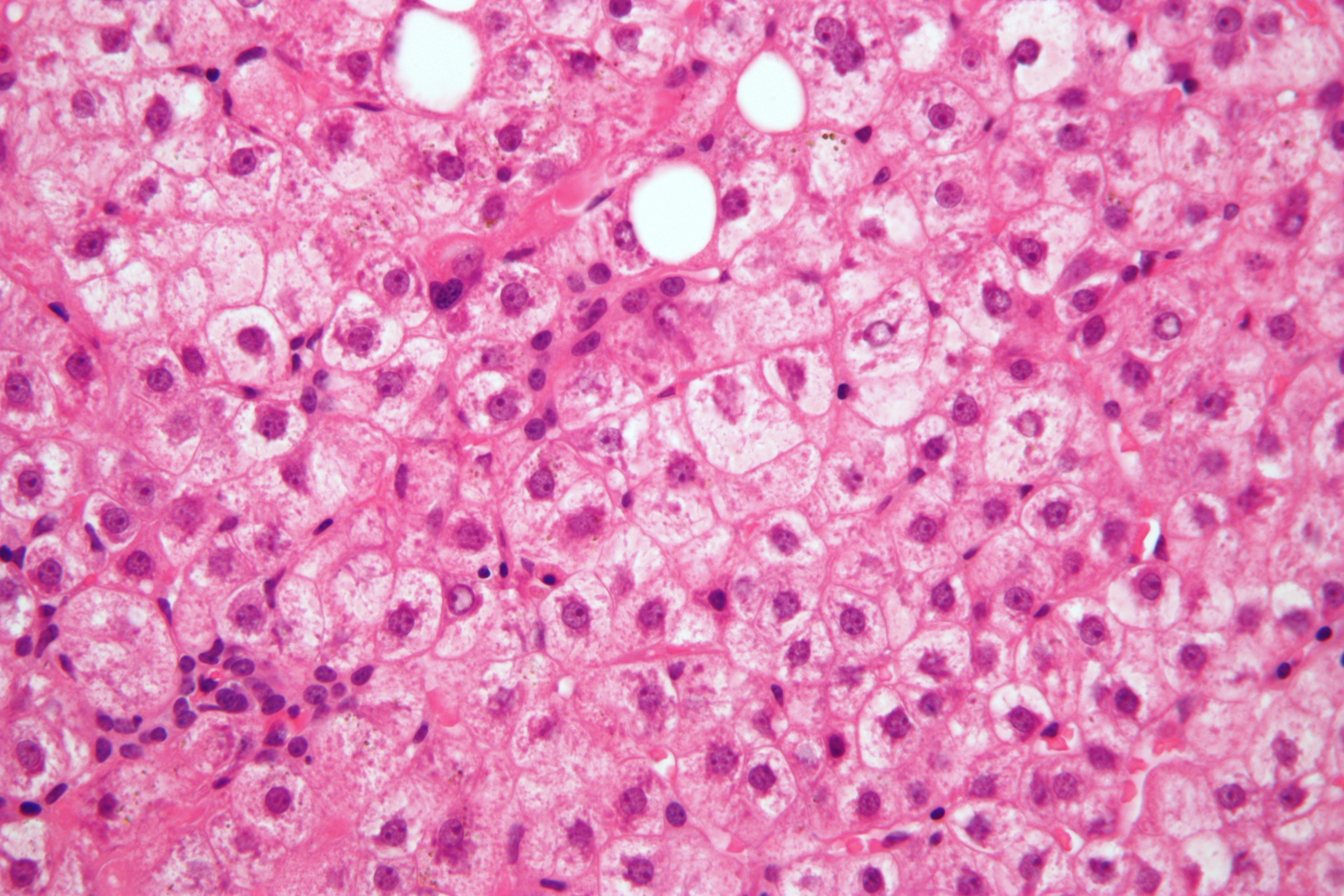
Ballooning degeneration. H&E stain.
