= Giannotti =

Giannotti is an Italian surname. Notable people with the surname include:

- Aldo Giannotti (born 1977), Italian-Austrian artist
- Claudia Giannotti (1937–2020), Italian film and television actress
- Donato Giannotti (1492–1573), Italian political writer and playwright
- Francesco Maria Giannotti (1635–1699), Roman Catholic prelate and Bishop of Segni
- José Arthur Giannotti (1930–2021), Brazilian philosopher, essayist, and university professor
- Maurilio Giannotti (died 1505), Roman Catholic prelate and Bishop of Calvi Risorta
- Pasquale Giannotti (born 1999), Italian football player
- Pio Giannotti (1898–1997), Italian Roman Catholic priest

== See also ==
- Gianotti
