= Agostino Crosti =

Italian dermatologist and professor

Agostino Crosti (February 16, 1896 – September 22, 1988), was an Italian dermatologist and professor of dermatology in Milan. Crosti's syndrome and Gianotti–Crosti syndrome are named after him.
