= Ground glass hepatocyte =

Pathologic change in liver cells

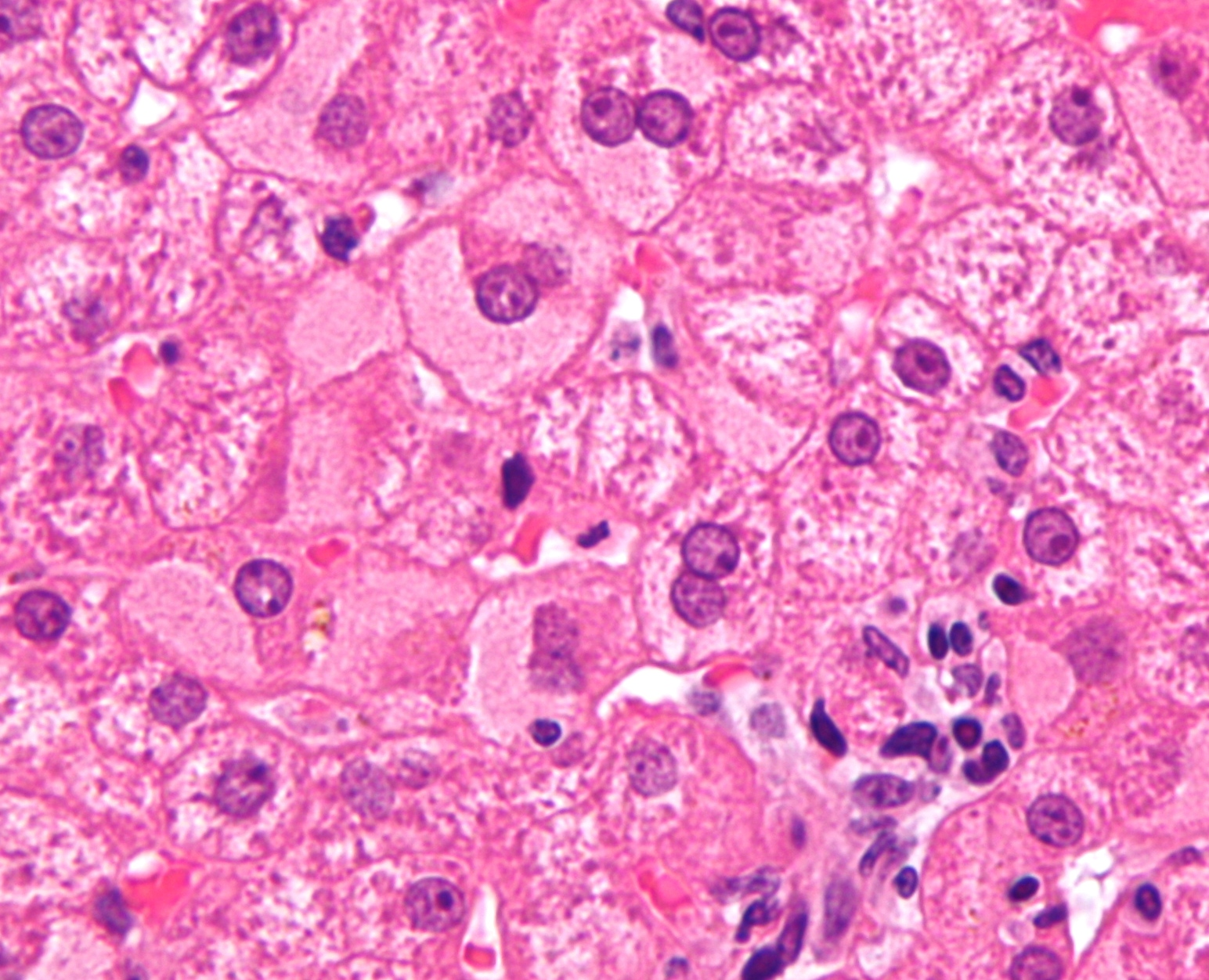
Micrograph showing ground glass hepatocytes. H&E stain.

In liver pathology, a ground glass hepatocyte, abbreviated GGH, is a liver parenchymal cell with a flat hazy and uniformly dull appearing cytoplasm on light microscopy. The cytoplasm's granular homogeneous eosinophilic staining is caused by the presence of HBsAg.

The appearance is classically associated with abundant hepatitis B antigen in the endoplasmic reticulum, but may also be drug-induced. In the context of hepatitis B, GGHs are only seen in chronic infections, i.e. they are not seen in acute hepatitis B.

GGHs were first described by Hadziyannis et al.

== Types ==
Several different types of GGHs are recognized:

- Type I - morphologically consist of GGHs that are scattered singly and have weak Pre-S2 positive immunostaining.
- Type II - morphologically consist of GGHs that are in clusters and have Pre-S2 negative immunostaining.

There is some evidence to suggest that type II GGHs predispose to hepatocellular carcinoma.

== See also ==
- Drug reaction
- Mallory body
- Viral hepatitis

== Additional images ==
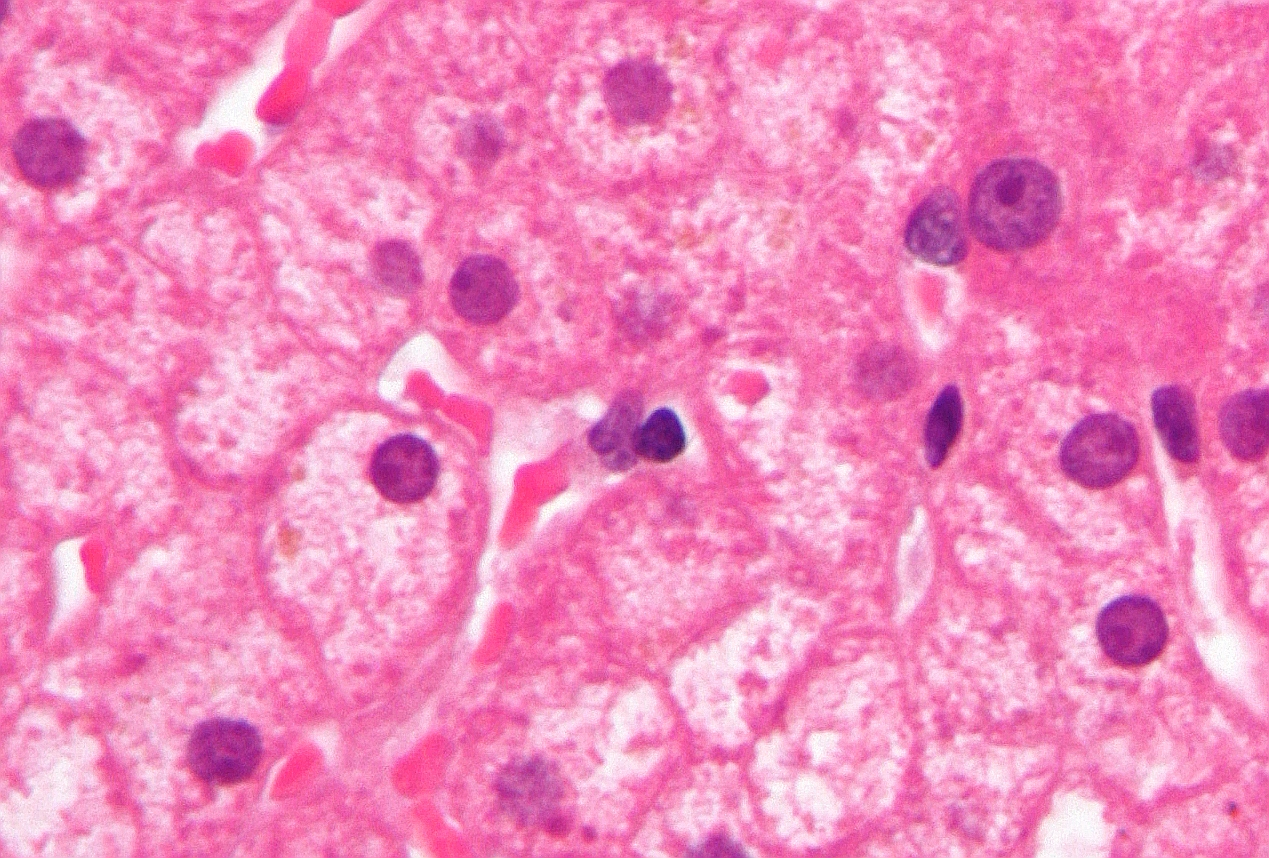
Micrograph showing ground glass hepatocytes. H&E stain.

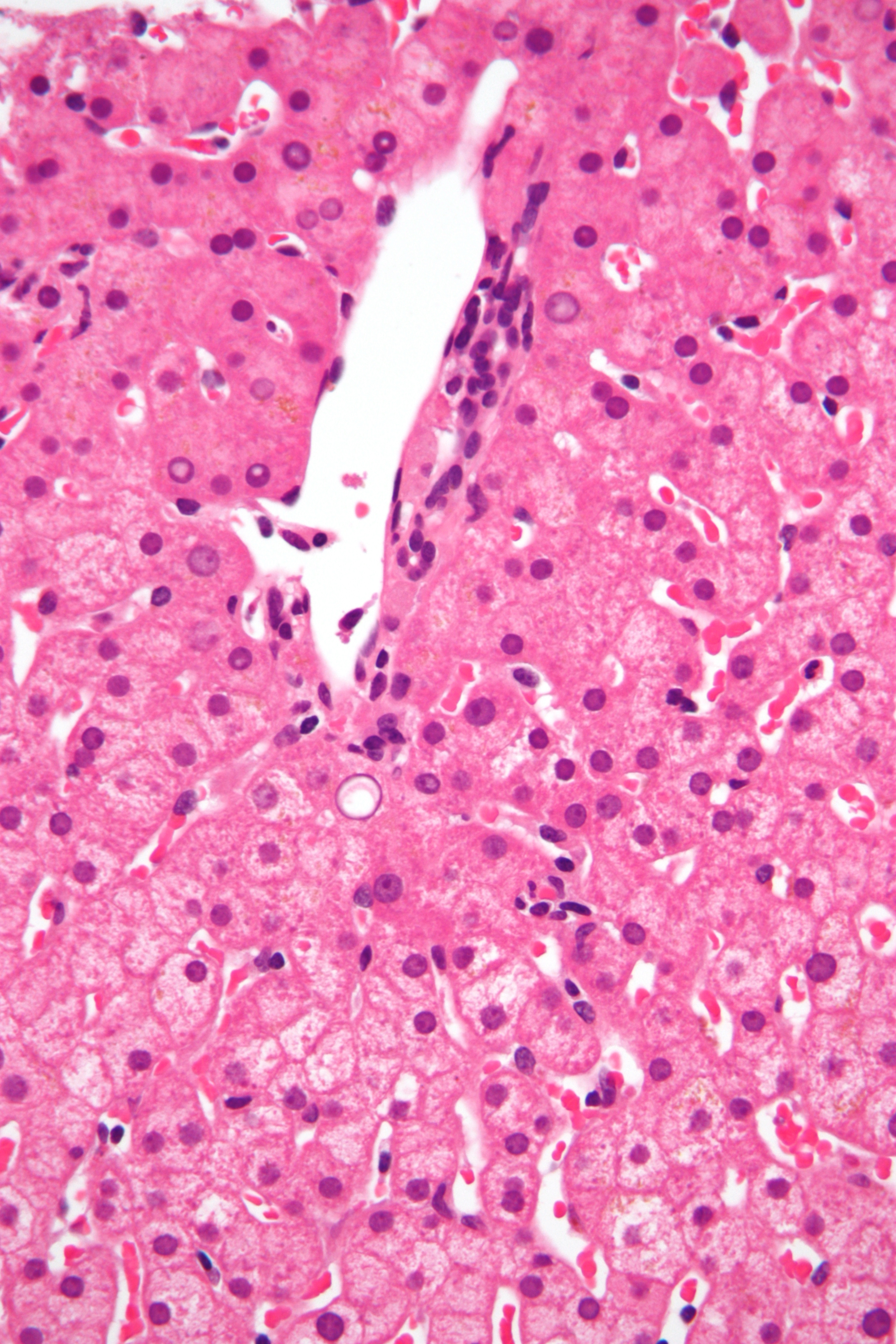
Micrograph showing ground glass hepatocytes. H&E stain.

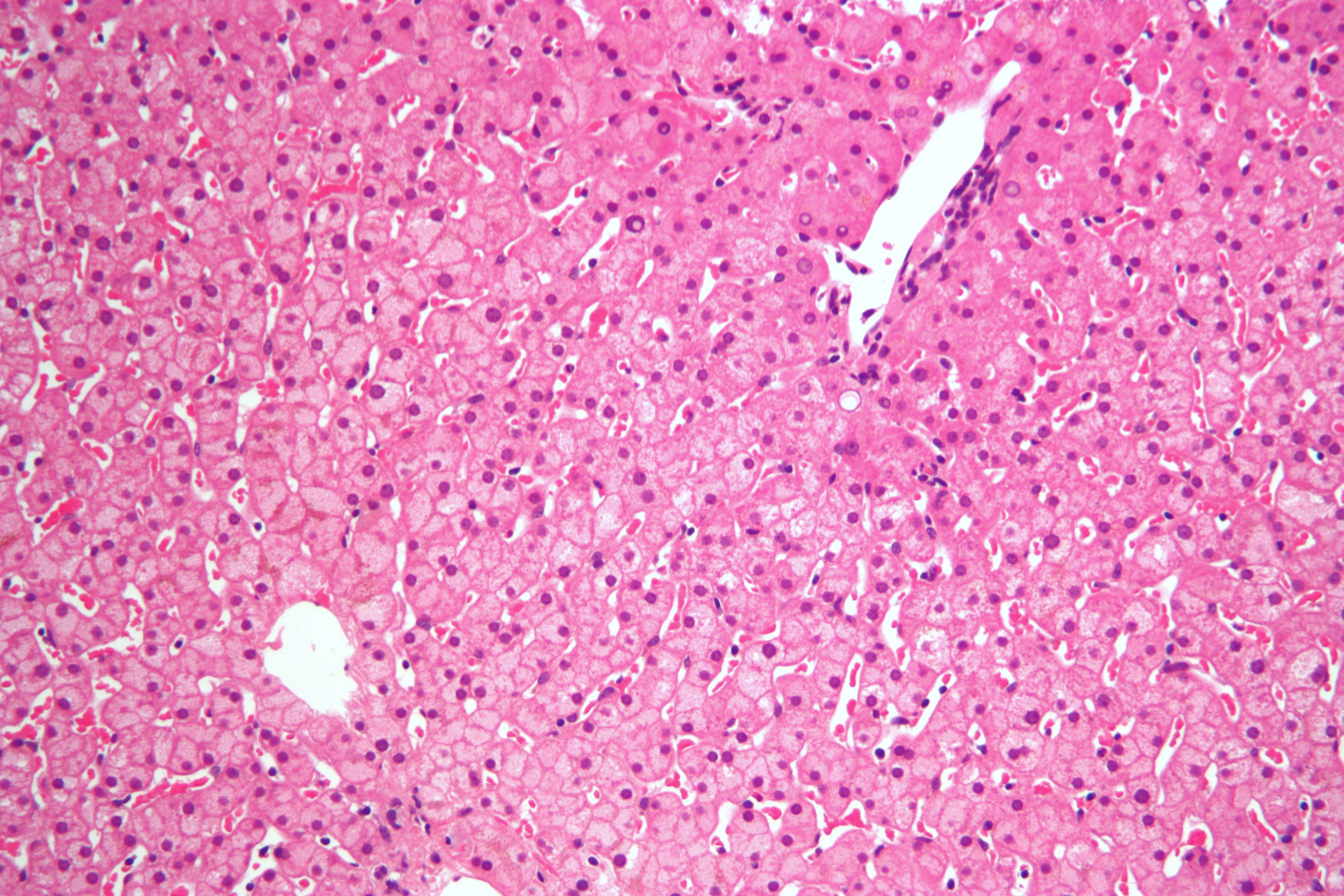
Micrograph showing ground glass hepatocytes. H&E stain.
