= Simeon Burt Wolbach =

American pathologist

- Born: July 3, 1880; Grand Island, Nebraska, U.S.
- Died: March 19, 1954 (aged 73); Sudbury, Massachusetts, U.S.
- Education: Harvard University; Harvard Medical School
- Known for: work on Rocky Mountain spotted fever, epidemic typhus, and scurvy
- Awards: American Academy of Arts and Sciences (1912); National Academy of Sciences (1938)
- Scientific career
- Fields: Pathology, bacteriology
- Workplaces: Harvard Medical School; McGill University; Bender Hygienic Laboratory; Peter Bent Brigham Hospital; Children's Hospital of Boston
- Doctoral advisor: William Thomas Councilman

Simeon Burt Wolbach (July 3, 1880 – March 19, 1954) was an American pathologist, researcher, teacher, and journal editor who elucidated the infection vectors for Rocky Mountain spotted fever and epidemic typhus. The bacterial genus Wolbachia is named after him.

== Early life ==
Wolbach was born in 1880 in Grand Island, Nebraska. He was the son of banker Samuel N. Wolbach and Rosa Stein. He was raised Jewish.

Wolbach attended the Lawrence Scientific School at Harvard for his undergraduate degree. He received an M.D. from Harvard Medical School in 1903.

Wolbach's early research was into the effects of radiation on skin. Later fieldwork in Africa got him interested in tropical parasitology. From 1903 to 1905, he completed his postgraduate studies in pathology at the Boston City Hospital under Frank Burr Mallory and William T. Councilman.

== Career ==
In 1905, Wolbach returned to Harvard Medical School and worked as a pathology assistant under Councilman. At the same time, he was the pathologist at the Boston Lying-In Hospital and the Long Island chronic care hospital. In 1908, he became the director of Bender Hygienic Laboratory (today part of St. Peter's Healthcare) in Albany, New York and an adjunct professor and department head of pathology and bacteriology at Albany Medical College.

He spent 1909 at Montreal General Hospital and McGill University. Working with McGill parasitologist John L. Todd, he carried uninfected lice (feeding them on their persons) to Poland in 1920 to demonstrate that lice transmit Rickettsia prowazekii, the organism which causes epidemic typhus. For this work, he received the rank of Commander in the Order of Polonia Restituta.

In 1910, he returned to Harvard Medical School's Department of Bacteriology. In 1914, he became an associate professor of pathology and bacteriology there. In 1922, he became the head of pathology, occupying the chair as Shattuck Professor of Pathological Anatomy. From 1922 to 1947, he was at Peter Bent Brigham Hospital and Children's Hospital of Boston as chief of pathology. Wolbach focused on childhood development and vitamin deficiencies. With J. M. Coppoletta at Brigham and Children's Hospitals, he developed tables of weights of vital organs for different ages and body lengths that became a definitive reference for pediatric pathology.

Wolbach was elected to the American Academy of Arts and Sciences in 1912 and to the National Academy of Sciences in 1938.

Wolbach was president of the American Association for Cancer Research in 1913-1914, the American Association of Pathologists and Bacteriologists in 1936, and the American Society for Experimental Pathology in 1937.

== Personal life ==
Wolbach married Anna F. Wellington in 1914 and had three children. He died in Sudbury, Massachusetts on March 19, 1954.

== Selected publications ==
- Wolbach, S. B.; Ernst, H. (December 1903). "Observations on the morphology of bacillus tuberculosis from human and bovine sources". Journal of Medical Research. 10 (3): 313–33. PMC 2105968. PMID 19971576.
- Wolbach, S. B. (November 1919). "Studies on Rocky Mountain spotted fever". Journal of Medical Research. 41 (1): 1–198.41. PMC 2104421. PMID 19972499.
- Hertig, M; Wolbach, S. Burt (March 1924). "Studies on Rickettsia-Like Micro-Organisms in Insects". Journal of Medical Research. 44 (3): 329–374.7. PMC 2041761. PMID 19972605.
- Blackfan, K. D.; Wolbach, S. B. (1933). "Vitamin A deficiency in infants: a clinical and pathological study". Journal of Pediatrics. 3 (5): 679–706. doi:10.1016/s0022-3476(33)80022-9.
