= Elevated alkaline phosphatase =

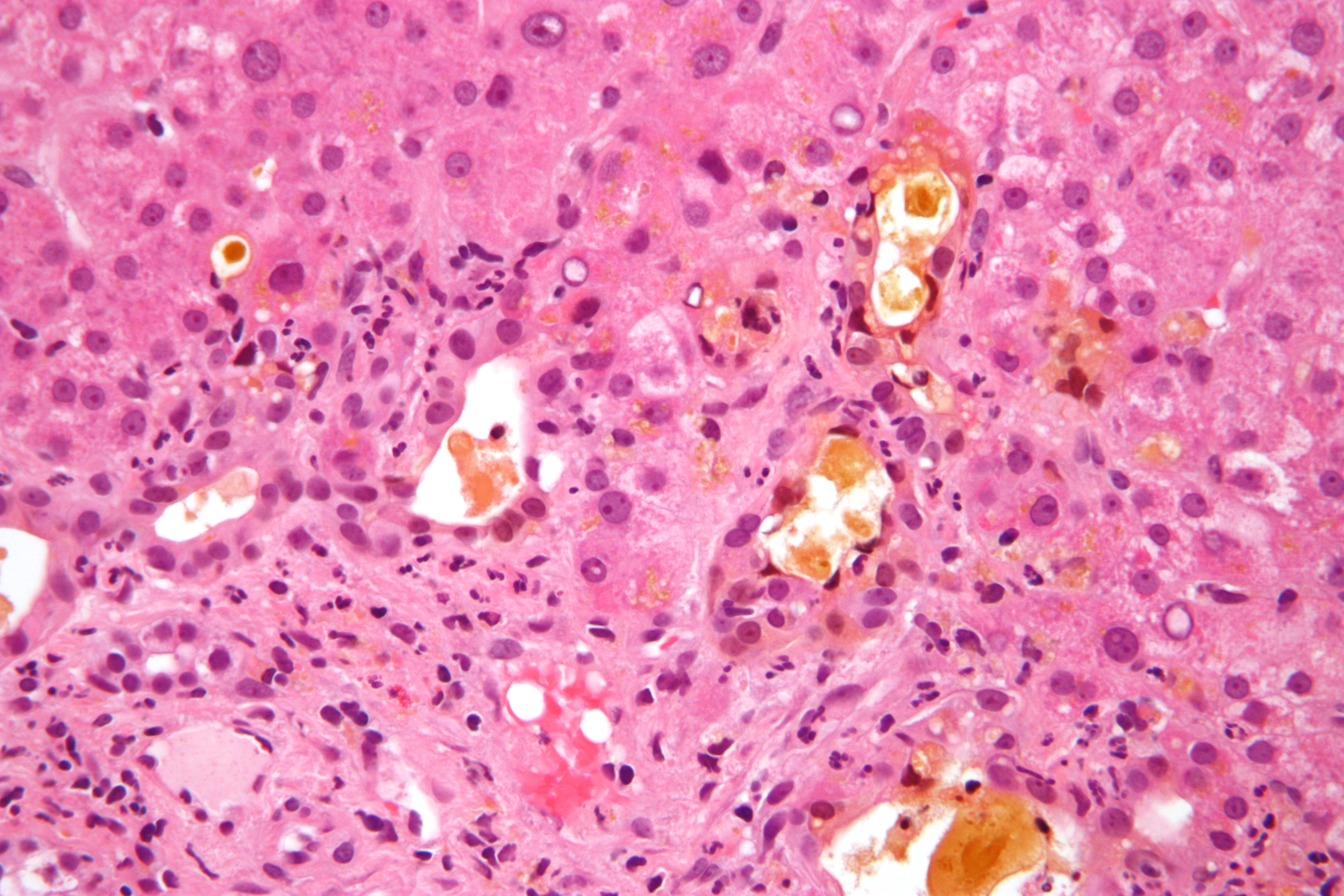
- Micrograph showing changes that may be associated with an elevated alkaline phosphatase (cholestasis and feathery degeneration). Liver biopsy. H&E stain.
- Specialty: Pathology

Elevated alkaline phosphatase occurs when levels of alkaline phosphatase (ALP) exceed the reference range. This group of enzymes has a low substrate specificity and catalyzes the hydrolysis of phosphate esters in a basic environment. The major function of alkaline phosphatase is transporting chemicals across cell membranes. Alkaline phosphatases are present in many human tissues, including bone, intestine, kidney, liver, placenta and white blood cells. Damage to these tissues causes the release of ALP into the bloodstream. Elevated levels can be detected through a blood test. Elevated alkaline phosphate is associated with certain medical conditions or syndromes (e.g., hyperphosphatasia with mental retardation syndrome, HPMRS). It serves as a significant indicator for certain medical conditions, diseases and syndromes.

If the cause for alkaline phosphatase elevation is unknown, isoenzyme studies using electrophoresis can confirm the source of the ALP. Heat stability also distinguishes bone and liver isoenzymes ("bone burns, liver lasts").

It is essential to use age-specific normal reference values, as healthy infants and children usually have levels that would be considered elevated in adults. Additionally, ALP levels are "not well defined" as of 2020, and can vary by sex and by racial group. Latinos tend to have higher normal levels, followed by those of African heritage; Europeans, and Asians or Pacific Islanders tend to have the lowest baseline ALP levels (all groups assuming body mass index within normal weight range). Men tend to have slightly higher normal ALP levels than women, except during pregnancy.

== Causes ==
=== Liver ===
- Liver (liver ALP):
  - Cholestasis, cholecystitis, cholangitis, cirrhosis, primary biliary cholangitis, primary sclerosis cholangitis, fatty liver, sarcoidosis, liver tumor, liver metastases, drug intoxication
  - Drugs: e.g. verapamil, carbamazepine, phenytoin, erythromycin, allopurinol, ranitidine, chlorpropamide, numerous antibiotics

=== Bones ===
- Bone disease (bone ALP):
  - Paget's disease, osteosarcoma, bone metastases of prostatic cancer (High / very high ALP values)
  - Other bone metastases
  - Renal osteodystrophy
  - Fractured bone
- Skeletal involvement of other primary diseases:
  - Osteomalacia, rickets, vitamin D deficiency (moderate rise)
  - Malignant tumors (ALP originating from tumor)
  - Renal disease (secondary hyperparathyroidism)
  - Hyperthyroidism.

Other unlisted musculoskeletal conditions may also cause elevated alkaline phosphatase.

=== Obesity ===
Elevated levels of the alkaline phosphatase enzyme are reported among those who have obesity. A study reported there were higher serum levels of alkaline phosphatase in obese than in the non-obese. With elevated alkaline phosphatase levels, there is an increase in disproportionate intracellular fat depots and thereby releasing itself into the bloodstream. The nature of the relationship between alkaline phosphatase and obesity is still being investigated.

=== Kidney ===
Elevated serum levels of alkaline phosphatase has been associated with chronic kidney disease (CKD). Studies have shown that elevated levels may predict mortality independent of bone metabolism factors and liver function tests in CKD. Elevated levels are also associated with diabetes, hypertension, and cardiovascular disease; it was found that elevated levels are associated with elevated serum C-reactive protein (CRP), which could reflect an inflammatory and atherogenic milieu, possibly an alternative cause for elevated serum alkaline phosphatase.

- Chronic kidney disease

=== Cancer ===
Elevated alkaline phosphatase in patients with cancer normally spans throughout the bones or liver. Metastases that exist in the lung, breast, prostate, colon, thyroid, and further organs can also enter the liver or bone. Cancers that are already present in certain organs and tissues can produce alkaline phosphatase elevations if metastasis is not present. In experiential studies, isoenzymes, which are distinct forms of alkaline phosphatase generated by these tumors, can raise the total volume of alkaline phosphatase in the blood. The Regan isoenzyme is one of the best studied of these isoenzymes that is linked to several human cancers. Basically, the Regan isoenzyme is an alkaline phosphatase that is located in the placenta and associated with gonadal and urologic cancers.

- Breast carcinoma
- Colon cancer
- Leukemia – cancer of the bone marrow
- Lymphoma – cancer of the white blood cells
- Pancreatic cancer
- Lung cancer

=== Other causes ===
- Infectious mononucleosis
- Primary sclerosing cholangitis
- Polycythemia vera
- Myelofibrosis
- Mastocytosis
- Leukemoid reaction to infection
- Women using hormonal contraception
- Pregnancy
- Herpes zoster (shingles)
- Rickets – vitamin D deficiency
- Amyloidosis
- Granulation tissue
- Gastrointestinal inflammation – inflammatory bowel disease (ulcerative colitis, Crohn's disease) or ulcers)
- Rheumatoid arthritis
- Ankylosing Spondylitis
- Transient hyperphosphatasaemia of infancy: benign, transient, often associated with infection
- Seminoma
- Celiac disease
- Sarcoidosis
- Syphilis
- Having B or O blood type.

== Diagnosis ==
An alkaline phosphatase isoenzyme test can be done to check for elevated ALP levels. Tissues that contain high levels of ALP include the liver, bile ducts, and bones. Normal levels of ALP range from (44 to 147) U/L (units per liter) and significantly elevated levels may be an indication of conditions such as various types of cancer, bone diseases such as Paget disease, liver diseases such as hepatitis, blood disorders, or other conditions.

Elevated alkaline phosphatase is most commonly caused by liver disease or bone disorders. Testing for ALP primarily consists of obtaining a blood sample from a patient along with several other tests for the disorder in question that may be associated with the increase in ALP in the blood serum. It is possible to distinguish between the different forms (isoenzymes) of ALP produced by different types of body tissues, in order to identify the cause of elevated ALP; this can facilitate choosing a treatment course.

Normally, children and adolescents have higher alkaline phosphatase levels than adults, due to accelerated bone growth. ALP is especially high during the pubertal growth spurt.

== Treatments ==
The following are the most common treatments of elevated alkaline phosphatase.

- Treatment of the underlying condition
  - Once doctors identify the cause of elevated ALP and diagnose a treatment, the levels of alkaline phosphatase fluctuates back to normal
- Removal of medication. Drugs can be associated with increased levels of alkaline phosphatase, including:
  - Birth control pills
  - Anti-inflammatory medication
  - Narcotic medication
  - Hormonal drug
  - Steroid
  - Antidepressant
- Dietary changes
  - Include foods rich in vitamin D
- Lifestyle change
  - Healthy diet in association with physical exercise
