= Feathery degeneration =

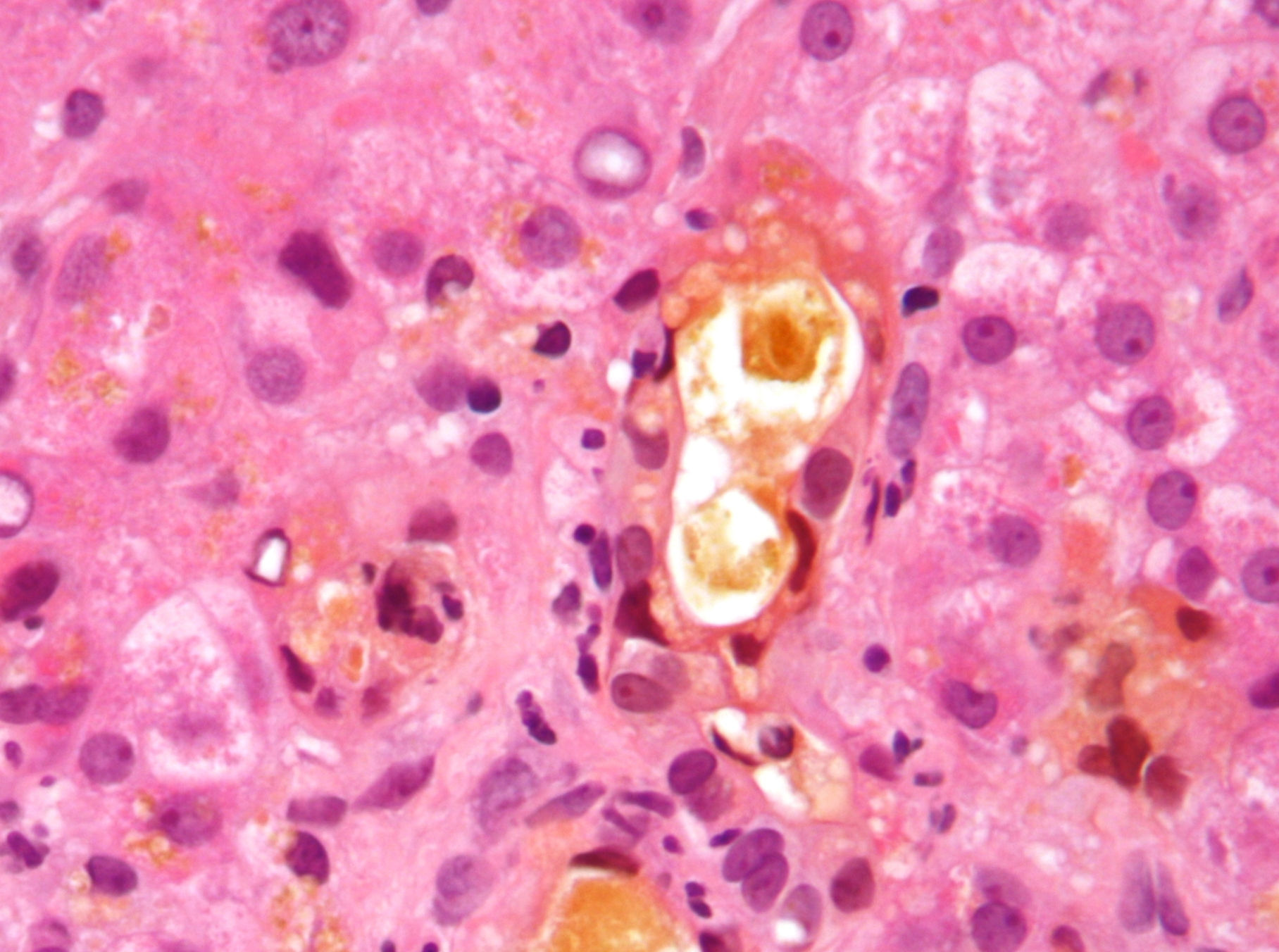
Feathery degeneration - large cells with pale flocculant cytoplasm (left-bottom and right-top). H&E stain.

In histopathology, feathery degeneration, formally feathery degeneration of hepatocytes, is a form of liver parenchymal cell (i.e. hepatocyte) death associated with cholestasis.

Cells undergoing this form of cell death have a flocculant appearing cytoplasm, and are larger than normal hepatocytes.

== Relation to ballooning degeneration ==
Feathery degeneration is somewhat similar in appearance to ballooning degeneration, which is due to other causes (e.g. alcohol, obesity); it also has cytoplasmic clearing and cell swelling.

== See also ==
- Elevated alkaline phosphatase (ALP)
- Mallory body
- Non-alcoholic fatty liver disease
- Steatohepatitis
- Primary sclerosing cholangitis

== Additional images ==
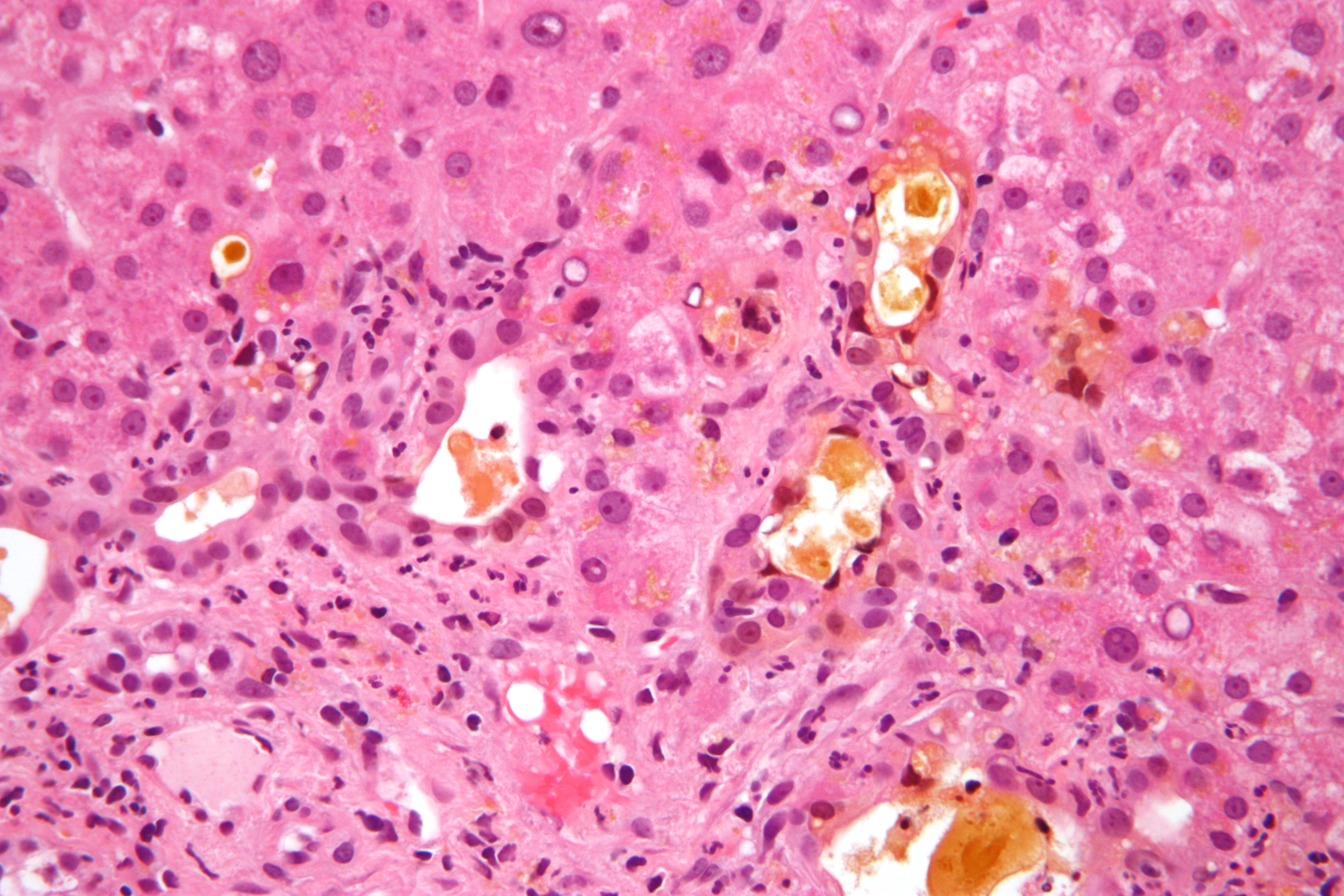
Feathery degeneration. H&E stain.
