= S. N. Wolbach =

American businessman, banker and politician

- Born: c. 1851
- Died: September 9, 1931; Grand Island, Nebraska
- Occupations: Businessman, banker, politician
- Children: 4 sons

S. N. Wolbach (c. 1851 - September 9, 1931) was an American businessman, banker and politician. He founded a store in Grand Island, Nebraska in 1874, and it later became a large department store in central Nebraska. He was the president of the First National Bank there from 1882 to 1884. He served as a member of the Nebraska House of Representatives for Hall County, Nebraska in 1885 and the Nebraska Senate twice. According to the Lincoln Journal Star, he was "one of the most progressive and substantial citizens of Nebraska, and contributed in various ways to its progress."

== Personal life ==
He was Jewish. His son, Simeon Burt Wolbach, was a noted pathologist at Harvard Medical School.
