= William Thomas Councilman =

American pathologist (1854–1933)

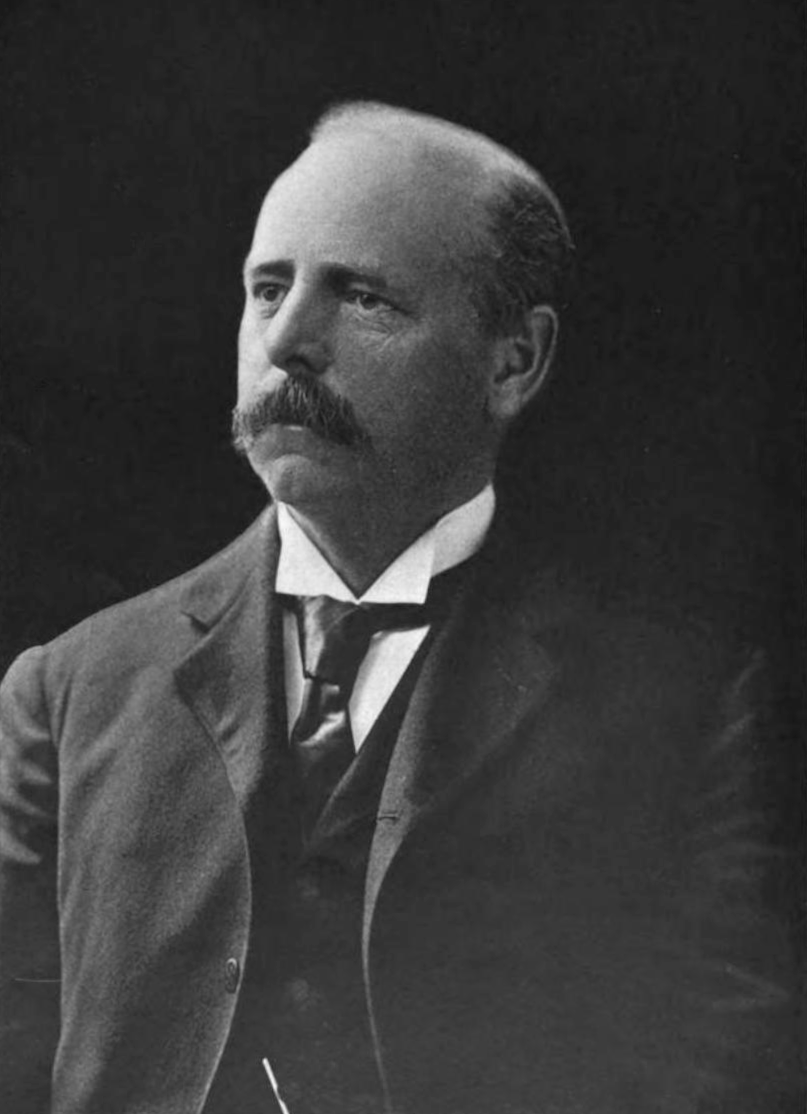
- Born: January 1, 1854; Pikesville, Maryland
- Died: May 26, 1933 (aged 79); York Harbor, Maine
- Education: Medical School of the University of Maryland (1878)
- Known for: work on amoebic dysentery (1891), Councilman body
- Scientific career
- Fields: Pathology
- Doctoral students: S. Burt Wolbach

William Thomas Councilman (January 1, 1854 – May 26, 1933) was an American pathologist.

He is remembered for his contribution in a monograph on amoebic dysentery (1891) which described detailed observations of it and its parasite. He is even better known for his work on Yellow Fever. William Thomas Councilman served as the first pathologist-in-chief at Peter Bent Brigham Hospital (PBBH). Councilman had arrived in Harvard Medical School earlier in 1892 and was an expert in the study of amebiasis, diphtheria, smallpox, and yellow fever. His vivid morphologic description of changes seen in the liver of yellow fever lives on today as "Councilman body".

== Biography ==
William Thomas Councilman was born in Pikesville, Maryland on January 1, 1854. He graduated from the Medical School of the University of Maryland in 1878.

In 1916, he went with the Rice Expedition, led by Alexander H. Rice Jr., to the Amazon and Brazil. With Robert Archibald Lambert, he wrote a report and book on the expedition which was published in 1918.

Councilman was an elected to the American Academy of Arts and Sciences, the United States National Academy of Sciences, and the American Philosophical Society.

By invitation, two years after his retirement at Harvard, he temporarily joined the staff of the Peking Union Medical College in China.

A horticulturist, Councilman always found time to care for his garden outside his office.

He died in York Harbor, Maine on May 26, 1933.

== Selected works ==
- Councilman, W.T., Disease And Its Causes, New York : Henry Holt and Company, 1913
- Councilman, W.T. and R.A. Lambert. The Medical Report of the Rice Expedition to Brazil, Cambridge: Harvard University Press, 1918

== See also ==
- Pathology
- List of pathologists
