= Gianotti–Crosti syndrome =

- Specialty: Dermatology

Gianotti–Crosti syndrome (/dʒəˈnɒti ˈkrɔːsti/), also known as infantile papular acrodermatitis, papular acrodermatitis of childhood, and papulovesicular acrolocated syndrome, is a reaction of the skin to a viral infection. Hepatitis B virus and Epstein–Barr virus are the most frequently reported pathogens. Other viruses implicated are hepatitis A virus, hepatitis C virus, cytomegalovirus, coxsackievirus, adenovirus, enterovirus, rotavirus, rubella virus, HIV, and parainfluenza virus.

It is named for Ferdinando Gianotti and Agostino Crosti.

== Presentation ==
Gianotti–Crosti syndrome mainly affects infants and young children. Children as young as 1.5 months and up to 12 years of age are reported to be affected. It is generally recognized as a papular or papulovesicular skin rash occurring mainly on the face and distal aspects of the four limbs. Purpura is generally not seen but may develop upon tourniquet test. However, extensive purpura without any hemorrhagic disorder has been reported. The presence of less florid lesions on the trunk does not exclude the diagnosis. Lymphadenopathy and hepatomegaly are sometimes noted. Raised AST and ALT levels with no rise in conjugated and unconjugated bilirubin levels are sometimes detectable, although the absence of such does not exclude the diagnosis. Spontaneous disappearance of the rash usually occurs after 15 to 60 days.

== Diagnosis ==
The diagnosis of Gianotti–Crosti syndrome is clinical. A validated diagnostic criterion is as follows:

A patient is diagnosed as having Gianotti–Crosti syndrome if:

1. On at least one occasion or clinical encounter, he/she exhibits all the positive clinical features,
2. On all occasions or clinical encounters related to the rash, he/she does not exhibit any of the negative clinical features,
3. None of the differential diagnoses is considered to be more likely than Gianotti–Crosti syndrome on clinical judgment, and
4. If lesional biopsy is performed, the histopathological findings are consistent with Gianotti–Crosti syndrome.

The positive clinical features are:

- Monomorphous, flat-topped, pink-brown papules or papulovesicles 1-10mm in diameter.
- At least three of the following four sites involved – (1) cheeks, (2) buttocks, (3) extensor surfaces of forearms, and (4) extensor surfaces of legs.
- Being symmetrical, and
- Lasting for at least ten days.

The negative clinical features are:

- Extensive truncal lesions, and
- Scaly lesions.

=== Differential diagnosis ===
The differential diagnoses are: acrodermatitis enteropathica, erythema infectiosum, erythema multiforme, hand-foot-and-mouth disease, Henoch–Schönlein purpura, Kawasaki disease, lichen planus, papular urticaria, papular purpuric gloves and socks syndrome, and scabies.

== Treatment ==
Gianotti-Crosti disease is a harmless and self-limiting condition, so no treatment may be required. Treatment is mainly focused on controlling itching, symptomatic relief and to avoid any further complications. For symptomatic relief from itching, oral antihistamines or any soothing lotions like calamine lotion or zinc oxide may be used. If there are any associated conditions like streptococcal infections, antibiotics may be required.

== See also ==
- List of cutaneous conditions
