= Ernst Ziegler (pathologist) =

Swiss pathologist

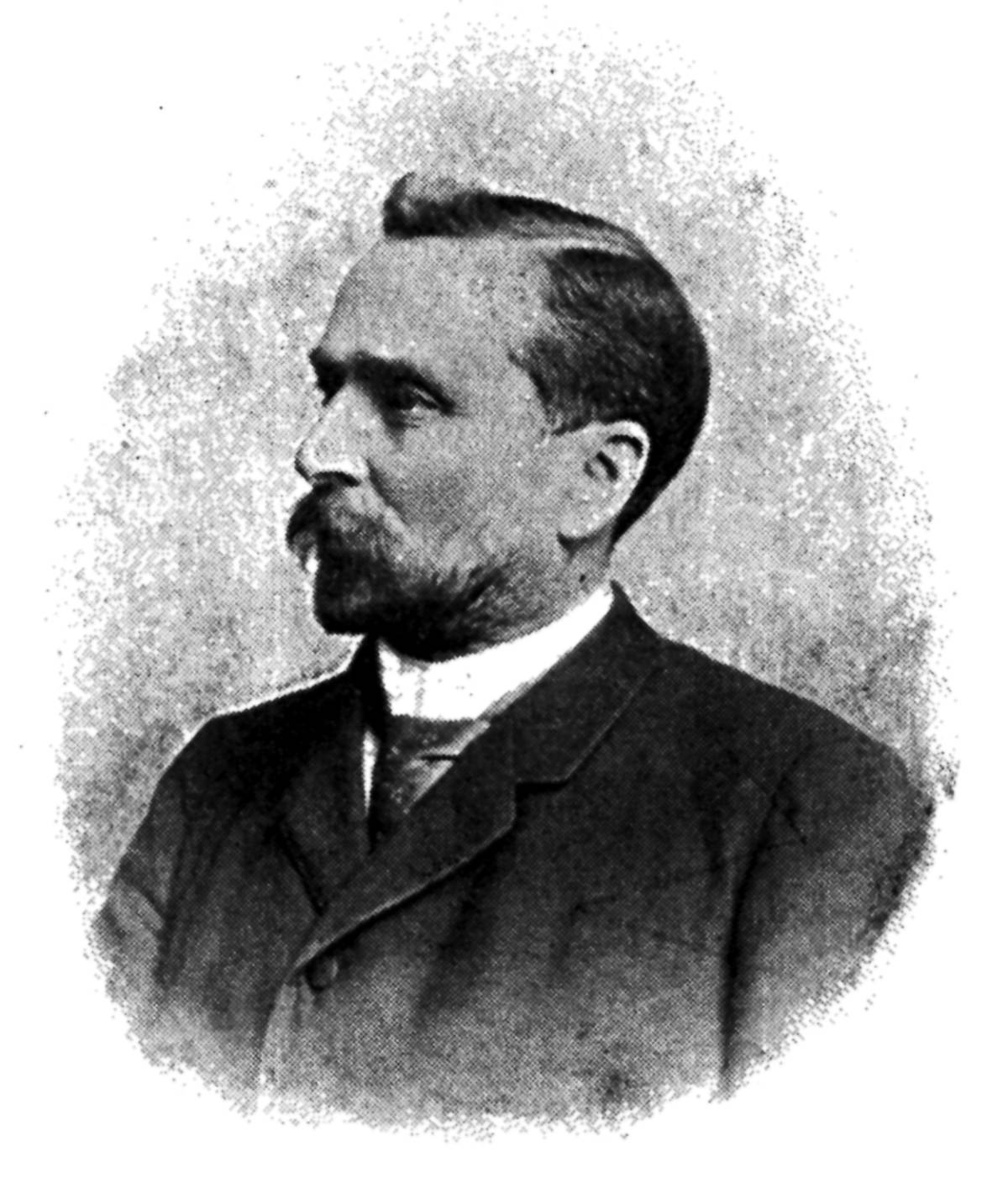
- Born: 17 March 1849
- Died: 30 November 1905 (aged 56)
- Education: University of Bern; University of Würzburg
- Scientific career
- Fields: Pathology
- Workplaces: University of Freiburg; University of Tübingen; University of Zurich

Ernst Ziegler (17 March 1849, Messen – 30 November 1905, Freiburg im Breisgau) was a Swiss pathologist.

== Academic career ==
He studied medicine at the universities of Bern and Würzburg, obtaining his doctorate at Bern in 1872. Afterwards, he served as an assistant to Edwin Klebs in Würzburg, and in 1878 he became an associate professor at the University of Freiburg. In 1881 he was appointed professor of pathology and director of the pathological institute in Zürich. During the following year he relocated as a professor to the University of Tübingen, and from 1889 to 1905, he was a professor at Freiburg.

== Published works ==
Ziegler was author of the highly regarded Lehrbuch der allgemeinen und speciellen pathologischen Anatomie und Pathogenese (1882), a work subsequently translated into English and published as A text-book of pathological anatomy and pathogenesis (Vol. 1, 1883; Vol. 2, 1884). His other principal written efforts include:

- Untersuchungen über pathologische Bindegewebs- und Gefässneubildung, 1876 – Pathological investigations of connective tissue and vascular neoplasms.
- Ueber Tuberculose und Schwindsucht, 1878 – Tuberculosis and consumption.

He was editor of the journal Centralblatt für allgemeine Pathologie und pathologische Anatomie.
