= Eosinophilic =

Quality of being colored by eosin

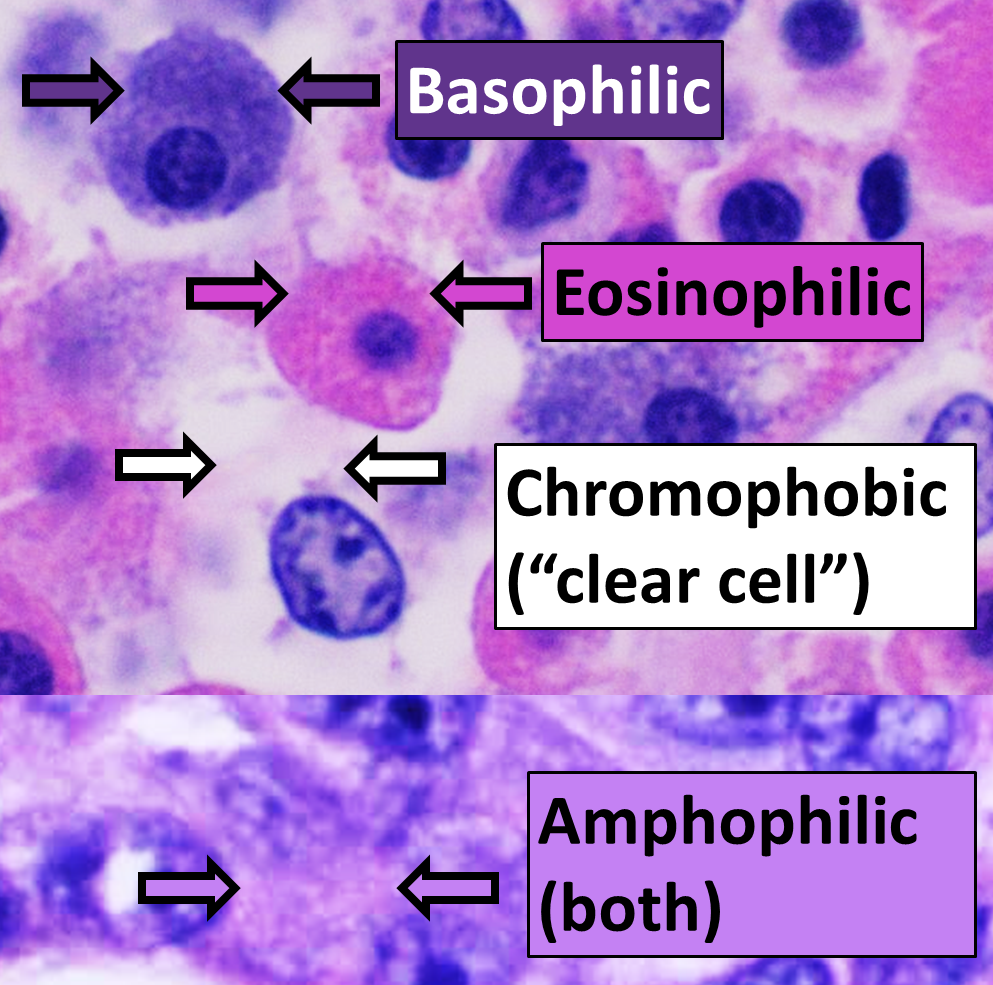
Main staining types when using hematoxylin and eosin (H&E).

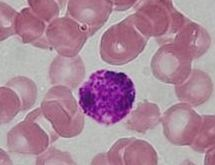
A basophil granulocyte is surrounded by lightly staining eosinophilic erythrocytes in an H&E staining.

Eosinophilic (Eosin, the name of a dye. Greek suffix -phil, meaning loving) describes the staining of tissues, cells, or organelles after they have been washed with eosin, a dye commonly used in histological staining.

Eosin is an acidic dye for staining cell cytoplasm, collagen, and muscle fibers. Eosinophilic describes the appearance of cells and structures seen in histological sections that take up the staining dye eosin. Such eosinophilic structures are, in general, composed of protein.

Eosin is usually combined with a stain called hematoxylin to produce a hematoxylin- and eosin-stained section (also called an H&E stain, HE or H+E section). It is the most widely used histological stain for a medical diagnosis. When a pathologist examines a biopsy of a suspected cancer, they will stain the biopsy with H&E.

Some structures seen inside cells are described as being eosinophilic; for example, Lewy and Mallory bodies. Some cells are also described as eosinophilic, such as Leukocytes.

== See also ==
- Basophilic (affinity to hematoxylin)
- Eosinophil
- Eosinophilia
- Eosinophilic meningitis
- Acidophile (histology)
