= Bepirovirsen =

Pharmaceutical drug

Clinical data
- Trade names: Hibsago
- Other names: GSK3228836, GSK-3228836
- License data: US DailyMed: Bepirovirsen
- Routes of administration: Subcutaneous
- Drug class: Antisense oligonucleotide
- ATC code: None

Legal status
- Legal status: US: ℞-only; JP: Rx-only

Identifiers
- IUPAC name: all-P-ambo-2'-O-(2-methoxyethyl)-P-thioguanylyl-(3'→5')-2'-O-(2-methoxyethyl)-5-methyl-P-thiocytidylyl-(3'→5')-2'-O-(2-methoxyethyl)-P-thioadenylyl-(3'→5')-2'-O-(2-methoxyethyl)-P-thioguanylyl-(3'→5')-2'-O-(2-methoxyethyl)-P-thioadenylyl-(3'→5')-2'-deoxy-P-thioguanylyl-(3'→5')-2'-deoxy-P-thioguanylyl-(3'→5')-P-thiothymidylyl-(3'→5')-2'-deoxy-P-thioguanylyl-(3'→5')-2'-deoxy-P-thioadenylyl-(3'→5')-2'-deoxy-P-thioadenylyl-(3'→5')-2'-deoxy-P-thioguanylyl-(3'→5')-2'-deoxy-5-methyl-P-thiocytidylyl-(3'→5')-2'-deoxy-P-thioguanylyl-(3'→5')-2'-deoxy-P-thioadenylyl-(3'→5')-2'-O-(2-methoxyethyl)-P-thioadenylyl-(3'→5')-2'-O-(2-methoxyethyl)-P-thioguanylyl-(3'→5')-2'-O-(2-methoxyethyl)-5-methyl-P-thiouridylyl-(3'→5')-2'-O-(2-methoxyethyl)-P-thioguanylyl-(3'→5')-2'-O-(2-methoxyethyl)-5-methylcytidine
- CAS Number: 1403787-62-1; 2563929-84-8
- UNII: Z87O6SM01N; XCC829VFT7
- KEGG: D12615
- ChEMBL: ChEMBL4650468

Chemical and physical data
- Formula: C_{230}H_{309}N_{88}O_{115}P_{19}S_{19}
- Molar mass: 7344.14 g·mol^{−1}
- SMILES: COCCO[C@@H]1[C@H](O)[C@@H](COP(O)(=S)O[C@H]2[C@@H](OCCOC)[C@H](n3cnc4c(=O)[nH]c(N)nc43)O[C@@H]2COP(O)(=S)O[C@H]2[C@@H](OCCOC)[C@H](n3cc(C)c(=O)[nH]c3=O)O[C@@H]2COP(O)(=S)O[C@H]2[C@@H](OCCOC)[C@H](n3cnc4c(=O)[nH]c(N)nc43)O[C@@H]2COP(O)(=S)O[C@H]2[C@@H](OCCOC)[C@H](n3cnc4c(N)ncnc43)O[C@@H]2COP(O)(=S)O[C@H]2C[C@H](n3cnc4c(N)ncnc43)O[C@@H]2COP(O)(=S)O[C@H]2C[C@H](n3cnc4c(=O)[nH]c(N)nc43)O[C@@H]2COP(O)(=S)O[C@H]2C[C@H](n3cc(C)c(N)nc3=O)O[C@@H]2COP(O)(=S)O[C@H]2C[C@H](n3cnc4c(=O)[nH]c(N)nc43)O[C@@H]2COP(O)(=S)O[C@H]2C[C@H](n3cnc4c(N)ncnc43)O[C@@H]2COP(O)(=S)O[C@H]2C[C@H](n3cnc4c(N)ncnc43)O[C@@H]2COP(O)(=S)O[C@H]2C[C@H](n3cnc4c(=O)[nH]c(N)nc43)O[C@@H]2COP(O)(=S)O[C@H]2C[C@H](n3cc(C)c(=O)[nH]c3=O)O[C@@H]2COP(O)(=S)O[C@H]2C[C@H](n3cnc4c(=O)[nH]c(N)nc43)O[C@@H]2COP(O)(=S)O[C@H]2C[C@H](n3cnc4c(=O)[nH]c(N)nc43)O[C@@H]2COP(O)(=S)O[C@H]2[C@@H](OCCOC)[C@H](n3cnc4c(N)ncnc43)O[C@@H]2COP(O)(=S)O[C@H]2[C@@H](OCCOC)[C@H](n3cnc4c(=O)[nH]c(N)nc43)O[C@@H]2COP(O)(=S)O[C@H]2[C@@H](OCCOC)[C@H](n3cnc4c(N)ncnc43)O[C@@H]2COP(O)(=S)O[C@H]2[C@@H](OCCOC)[C@H](n3cc(C)c(N)nc3=O)O[C@@H]2COP(O)(=S)O[C@H]2[C@@H](OCCOC)[C@H](n3cnc4c(=O)[nH]c(N)nc43)O[C@@H]2CO)O[C@H]1n1cc(C)c(N)nc1=O
- InChI: InChI=1S/C230H309N88O115P19S19/c1-92-46-299(226(332)276-172(92)231)127-36-97(415-434(337,453)381-57-113-104(43-134(400-113)309-82-269-145-189(309)281-219(242)290-200(145)325)422-441(344,460)380-56-112-101(40-131(399-112)306-79-263-139-177(236)251-73-257-183(139)306)424-443(346,462)387-63-121-156(166(370-30-20-360-10)210(409-121)312-85-264-140-178(237)252-74-258-184(140)312)430-450(353,469)393-69-125-160(170(374-34-24-364-14)215(413-125)317-90-274-150-194(317)286-224(247)295-205(150)330)432-449(352,468)389-65-120-155(165(369-29-19-359-9)209(408-120)303-50-96(5)197(322)298-230(303)336)427-448(351,467)392-68-124-159(169(373-33-23-363-13)214(412-124)316-89-273-149-193(316)285-223(246)294-204(149)329)429-445(348,464)386-62-118-152(320)162(366-26-16-356-6)207(406-118)301-47-93(2)173(232)277-227(301)333)108(395-127)52-376-436(339,455)419-102-41-132(307-80-267-143-187(307)279-217(240)288-198(143)323)402-115(102)59-383-439(342,458)418-100-39-130(305-78-262-138-176(235)250-72-256-182(138)305)397-110(100)54-378-438(341,457)417-99-38-129(304-77-261-137-175(234)249-71-255-181(137)304)398-111(99)55-379-440(343,459)421-105-44-135(310-83-270-146-190(310)282-220(243)291-201(146)326)401-114(105)58-382-435(338,454)416-98-37-128(300-49-95(4)196(321)297-229(300)335)396-109(98)53-377-437(340,456)420-103-42-133(308-81-268-144-188(308)280-218(241)289-199(144)324)403-116(103)60-384-442(345,461)423-106-45-136(311-84-271-147-191(311)283-221(244)292-202(147)327)404-117(106)61-385-444(347,463)428-157-122(410-211(167(157)371-31-21-361-11)313-86-265-141-179(238)253-75-259-185(141)313)66-391-452(355,471)433-161-126(414-216(171(161)375-35-25-365-15)318-91-275-151-195(318)287-225(248)296-206(151)331)70-394-451(354,470)431-158-123(411-212(168(158)372-32-22-362-12)314-87-266-142-180(239)254-76-260-186(142)314)67-390-447(350,466)426-154-119(407-208(164(154)368-28-18-358-8)302-48-94(3)174(233)278-228(302)334)64-388-446(349,465)425-153-107(51-319)405-213(163(153)367-27-17-357-7)315-88-272-148-192(315)284-222(245)293-203(148)328/h46-50,71-91,97-136,152-171,207-216,319-320H,16-45,51-70H2,1-15H3,(H,337,453)(H,338,454)(H,339,455)(H,340,456)(H,341,457)(H,342,458)(H,343,459)(H,344,460)(H,345,461)(H,346,462)(H,347,463)(H,348,464)(H,349,465)(H,350,466)(H,351,467)(H,352,468)(H,353,469)(H,354,470)(H,355,471)(H2,231,276,332)(H2,232,277,333)(H2,233,278,334)(H2,234,249,255)(H2,235,250,256)(H2,236,251,257)(H2,237,252,258)(H2,238,253,259)(H2,239,254,260)(H,297,321,335)(H,298,322,336)(H3,240,279,288,323)(H3,241,280,289,324)(H3,242,281,290,325)(H3,243,282,291,326)(H3,244,283,292,327)(H3,245,284,293,328)(H3,246,285,294,329)(H3,247,286,295,330)(H3,248,287,296,331)/t97-,98-,99-,100-,101-,102-,103-,104-,105-,106-,107+,108+,109+,110+,111+,112+,113+,114+,115+,116+,117+,118+,119+,120+,121+,122+,123+,124+,125+,126+,127+,128+,129+,130+,131+,132+,133+,134+,135+,136+,152+,153+,154+,155+,156+,157+,158+,159+,160+,161+,162+,163+,164+,165+,166+,167+,168+,169+,170+,171+,207+,208+,209+,210+,211+,212+,213+,214+,215+,216+,434?,435?,436?,437?,438?,439?,440?,441?,442?,443?,444?,445?,446?,447?,448?,449?,450?,451?,452?/m0/s1; Key:YQNJZPFGZLXVFA-VOYCTQJNSA-N

Bepirovirsen, sold under the brand name Hibsago, is a medication used for the treatment of hepatitis B virus infection. It is a hepatitis B virus mRNA-directed antisense oligonucleotide.

Bepirovirsen was approved for medical use in Japan in August 2026, and in the United States in October 2026. It is the first antisense oligonucleotide approved by the US Food and Drug Administration to treat chronic hepatitis B.

== Medical uses ==
Bepirovirsen is indicated in combination with nucleos(t)ide analog reverse transcriptase inhibitor (NrtI) therapy for treatment of chronic hepatitis B virus infection in adults without cirrhosis who have been on NrtI therapy for at least six months and have suppressed hepatitis B virus deoxyribonucleic acid (DNA); and who have hepatitis B virus surface antigen (HBsAg) levels less than or equal to 3,000 IU/mL as determined by an FDA-authorized test.

== Adverse effects ==
The US prescription label for bepirovirsen has a boxed warning for serious liver reactions as well as low platelet counts, which can increase the risk of potentially life-threatening bleeding. It also has warnings for worsening kidney function, serious inflammatory adverse reactions like vasculitis, and serious risks if the injection is not administered properly.

== Society and culture ==
=== Legal status ===
Bepirovirsen was approved for medical use in Japan in August 2026, and in the United States in October 2026. The US Food and Drug Administration (FDA) granted the application for bepirovirsen fast track, breakthrough therapy, and priority review designations. The FDA granted the approval to GSK.

=== Names ===
Bepirovirsen is the international nonproprietary name.

Bepirovirsen is sold under the name Hibsago.
