= Ferdinando Gianotti =

Italian pediatric dermatologist (1920-1984)

Ferdinando Gianotti (1920 – 1984) was an Italian pediatric dermatologist. He is known for describing Gianotti-Crosti syndrome which was named after him. Gianotti published over 190 clinical and experimental studies.
