= Mallory body =

Pathologic finding in liver cells

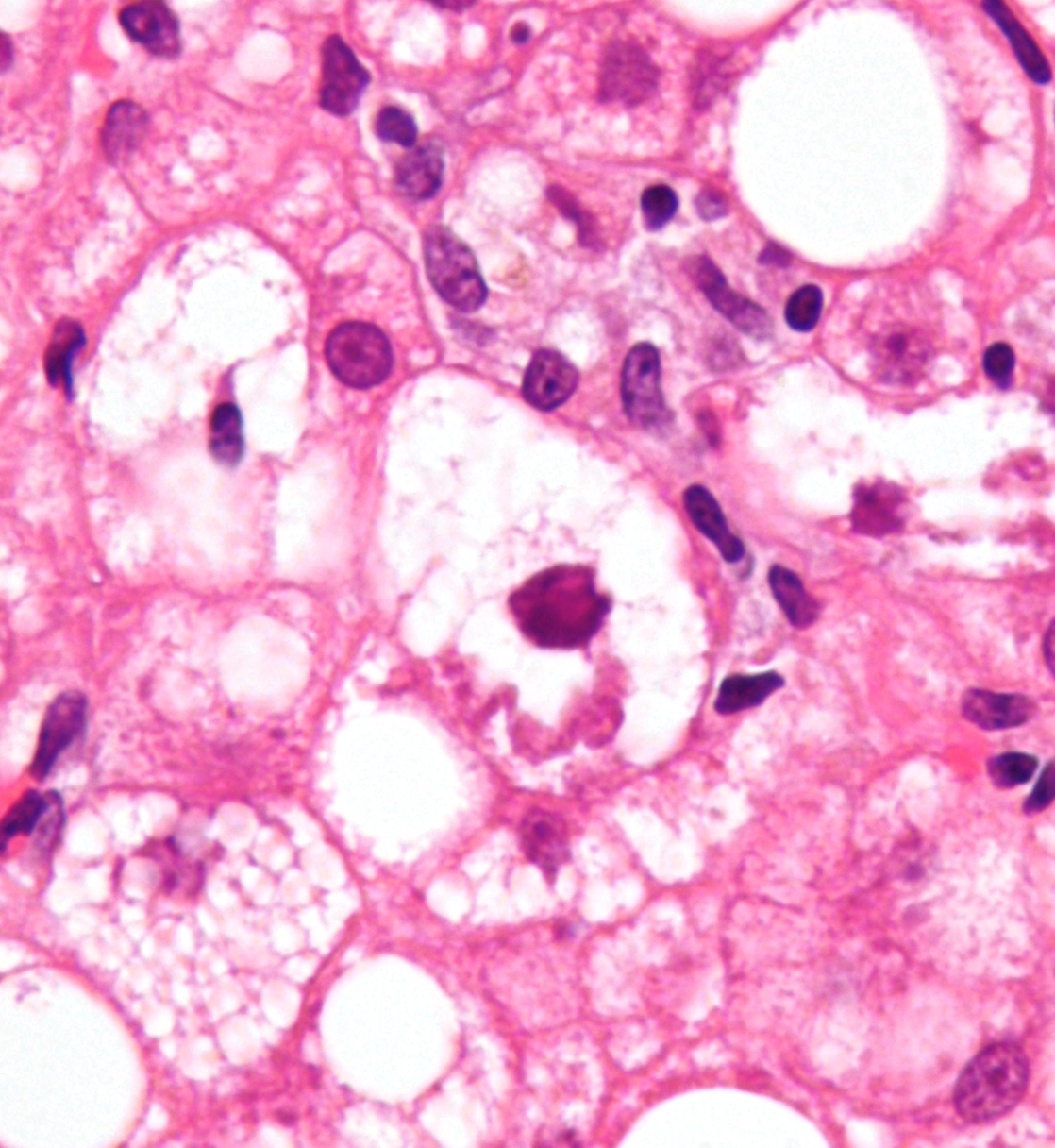
Micrograph showing a Mallory body with the characteristic twisted-rope appearance (centre of image - within a ballooning hepatocyte). H&E stain.

In histopathology, a Mallory body, Mallory–Denk body (MDB), or Mallory's hyaline is an inclusion found in the cytoplasm of liver cells. Mallory bodies are damaged intermediate filaments within the liver cells.

== Associated conditions ==
Mallory bodies are classically found in the livers of people suffering from alcohol-induced liver disease and were once thought to be specific for that.

They are most common in alcoholic hepatitis (prevalence of 65%) and alcoholic cirrhosis (prevalence of 51%).

They are a recognized feature of Wilson's disease (25%), primary biliary cirrhosis (24%), non-alcoholic cirrhosis (24%), hepatocellular carcinoma (23%) and morbid obesity (8%), among other conditions. However, it has also been reported in certain other unrelated conditions.

== Appearance ==
Mallory bodies are highly eosinophilic and thus appear pink on H&E stain. The bodies themselves are made up of intermediate cytokeratin 8/18 filament proteins that have been ubiquitinated, or bound by other proteins such as heat shock proteins, or p62/Sequestosome 1.

== Eponym ==
It is named for the American pathologist Frank Burr Mallory, who first described the structures in 1911. A renaming as Mallory–Denk bodies was proposed in 2007 to honor the contribution of Austrian pathologist Helmut Denk for the molecular analysis of the pathogenesis of MDBs.

== Additional images ==
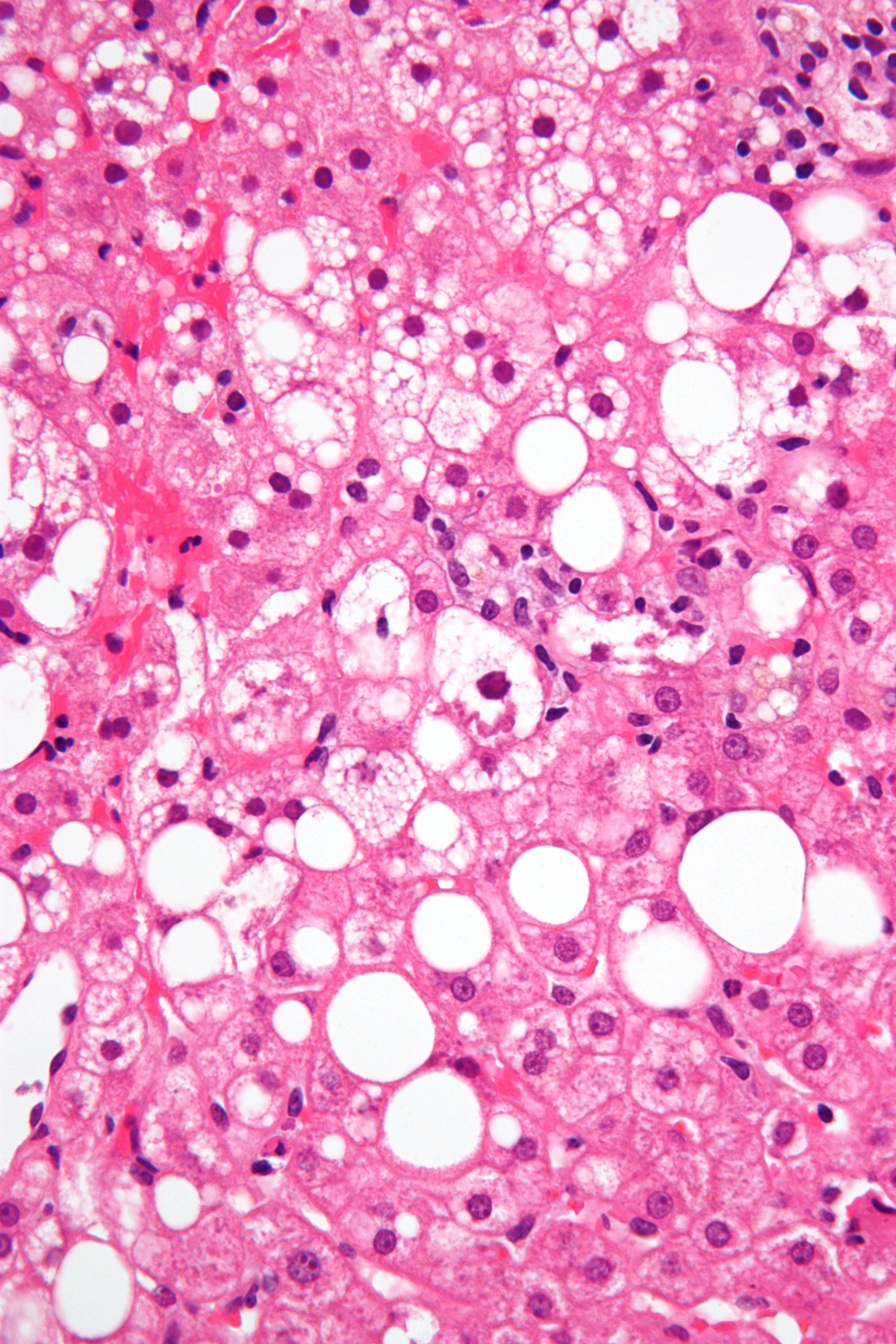
Micrograph showing a Mallory body. Original magnification 400X. H&E stain.

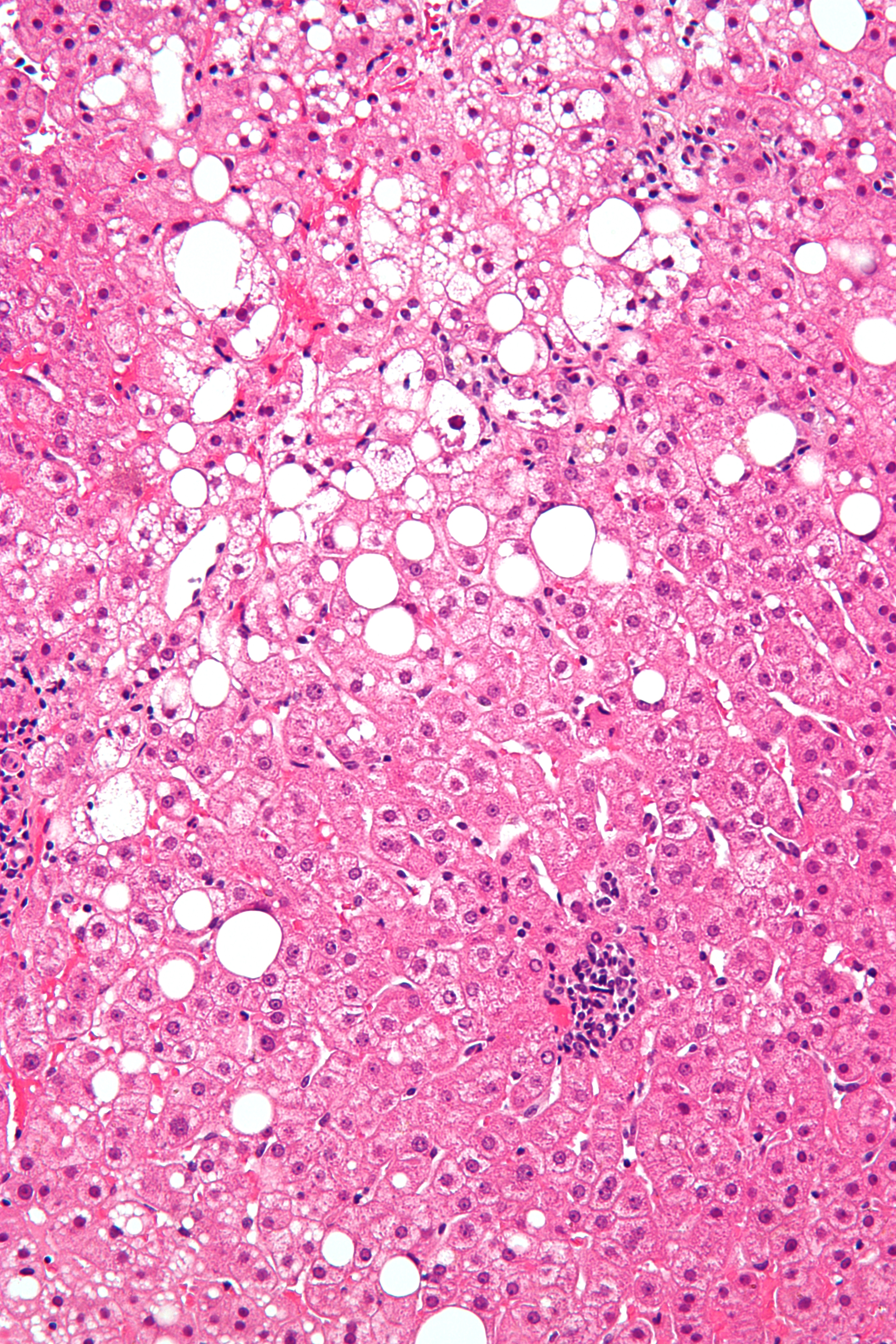
Micrograph showing a Mallory body. Original magnification 200X. H&E stain.

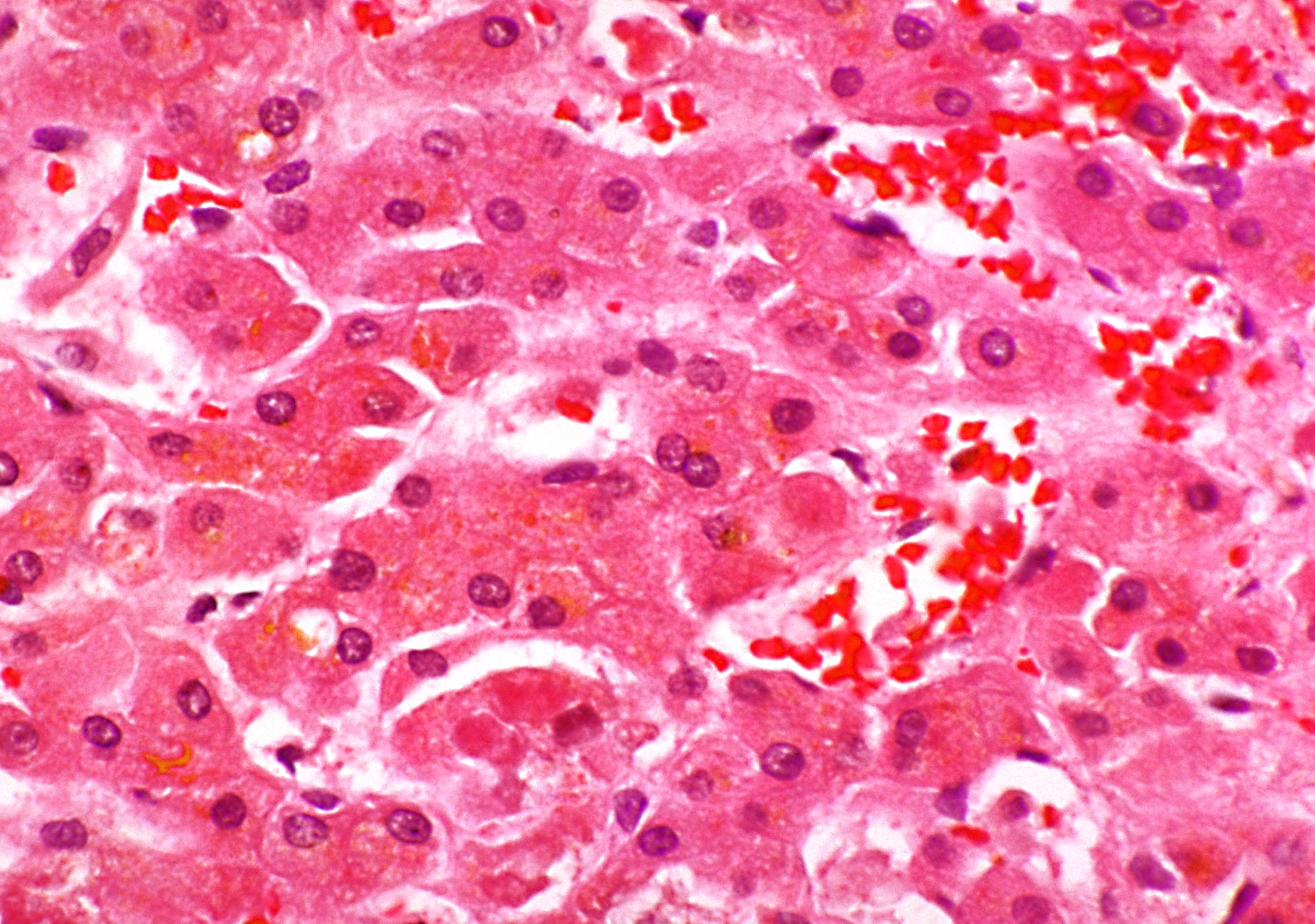
Liver micrograph showing abundant Mallory bodies, as seen in alcohol use disorder.

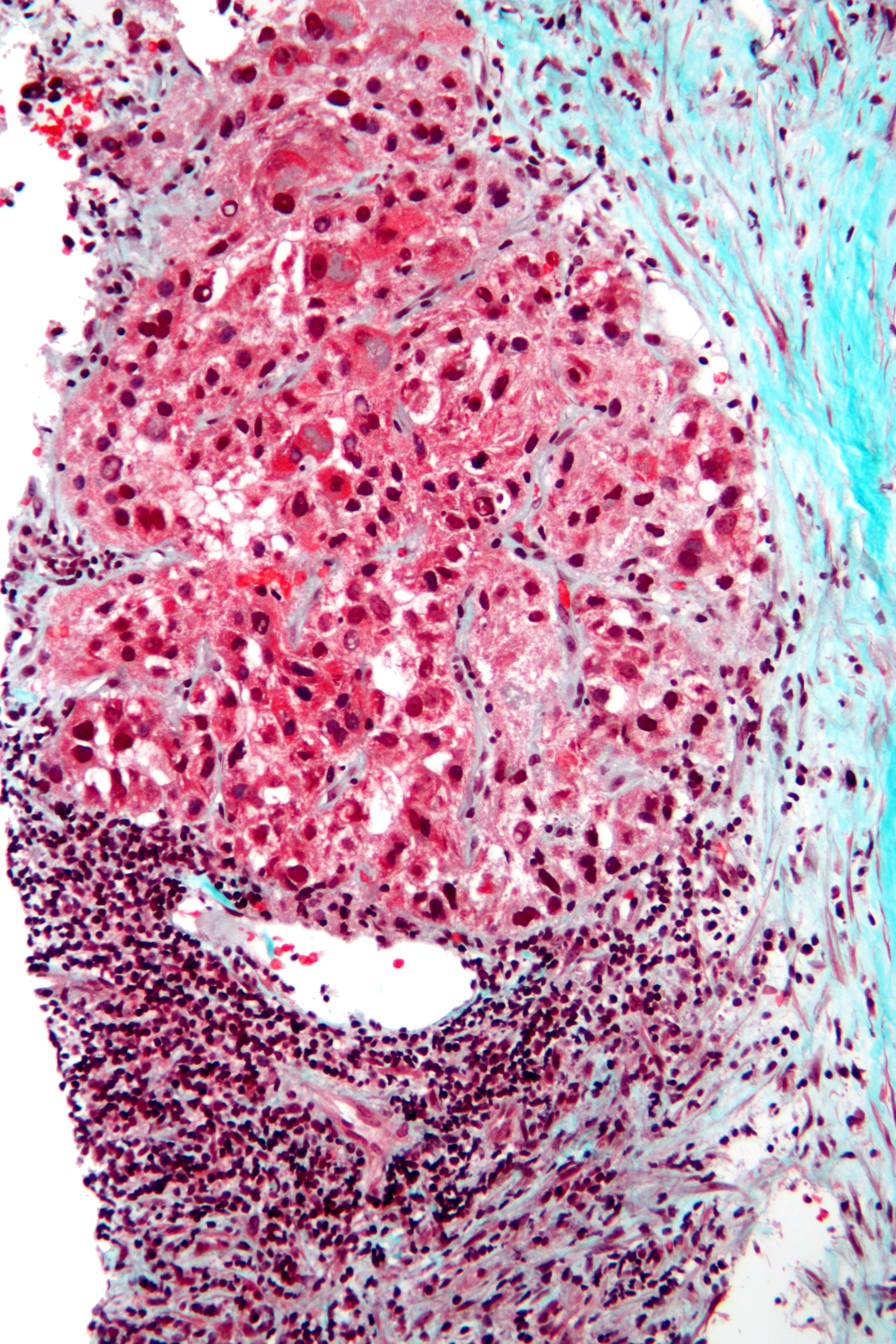
Mallory bodies in hepatocellular carcinoma. Trichrome stain.

== See also ==
- Ballooning degeneration – another histopathologic finding of steatohepatitis
