= List of Brazilian National Forests =

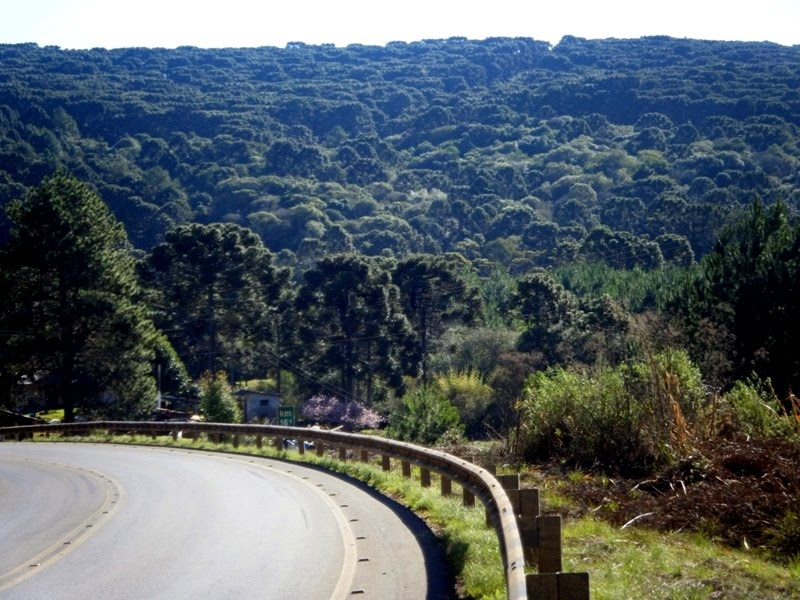
Caçador National Forest

According to the National System of Nature Conservation Units, a national forest of Brazil is an area with forest cover of predominantly native species that has as its basic objective the multiple sustainable use of the forest resources and scientific research, with emphasis on methods of sustainable exploitation of native forests. There are 67 national forests in Brazil.

Name	State	Biome	Created	Area (ha)
Açu	Rio Grande do Norte	Caatinga	2001	225
Açungui	Paraná	Atlantic Forest	1968	490
Altamira	Pará	Amazon	1998	725,406
Amaná	Pará	Amazon	2006	542,655
Amapá	Amapá	Amazon	1989	460,359
Amazonas	Amazonas	Amazon	1989	1,944,203
Anauá	Roraima	Amazon	2005	259,400
Araripe-Apodi	Ceará	Caatinga	1946	38,919
Aripuanã	Amazonas	Amazon	2016	751,295
Balata-Tufari	Amazonas	Amazon	2008	1,079,954
Bom Futuro	Rondônia	Amazon	1988	97,405
Brasília	Federal District	Cerrado	1999	9,336
Caçador	Santa Catarina	Atlantic Forest	1968	706
Canela	Rio Grande do Sul	Atlantic Forest	1968	563
Capão Bonito	São Paulo	Atlantic Forest	1968	4,236
Carajás	Pará	Amazon	1998	391,255
Caxiuanã	Pará	Amazon	1961	317,946
Chapecó	Santa Catarina	Atlantic Forest	1968	1,604
Contendas do Sincorá	Bahia	Caatinga	1999	11,215
Crepori	Pará	Amazon	2006	740,396
Cristópolis	Bahia	Cerrado	2001	12,840
Goytacazes	Espírito Santo	Atlantic Forest	2002	1,425
Humaitá	Amazonas	Amazon	1998	473,256
Ibirama	Santa Catarina	Atlantic Forest	1988	519
Ibura	Sergipe	Atlantic Forest	2005	144
Ipanema	São Paulo	Atlantic Forest	1992	5,384
Iquiri	Amazonas	Amazon	2008	1,472,599
Irati	Paraná	Atlantic Forest	1968	3,802
Itacaiunas	Pará	Amazon	1968	136,699
Itaituba I	Pará	Amazon	1998	212,881
Itaituba II	Pará	Amazon	1998	427,366
Jacundá	Rondônia	Amazon	2004	221,229
Jamanxim	Pará	Amazon	2006	1,301,567
Jamari	Rondônia	Amazon	1984	222,151
Jatuarana	Amazonas	Amazon	2002	569,482
Lorena	São Paulo	Atlantic Forest	2001	281
Macauã	Acre	Amazon	1988	176,356
Mapiá-Inauini	Amazonas	Amazon	1989	176,356
Mário Xavier	Rio de Janeiro	Atlantic Forest	1986	495
Mata Grande	Goiás	Cerrado	2003	2,009
Mulata	Pará	Amazon	2001	216,446
Negreiros	Pernambuco	Caatinga	2007	3,004
Nísia Floresta	Rio Grande do Norte	Atlantic Forest	2001	168
Pacotuba	Espírito Santo	Atlantic Forest	2002	449
Palmares	Piauí	Caatinga	2005	168
Paraopeba	Minas Gerais	Cerrado	2001	203
Passa Quatro	Minas Gerais	Atlantic Forest	1968	335
Passo Fundo	Rio Grande do Sul	Atlantic Forest	1968	1,333
Pau-Rosa	Amazonas	Amazon	2001	827,877
Piraí do Sul	Paraná	Atlantic Forest	2004	170
Purus	Amazonas	Amazon	1998	256,121
Restinga de Cabedelo	Paraíba	Atlantic Forest	2004	114
Rio Preto	Espírito Santo	Atlantic Forest	1998	2,561
Ritápolis	Minas Gerais	Atlantic Forest	1999	89
Roraima	Roraima	Amazon	1989	167,268
Santa Rosa do Purus	Acre	Amazon	2001	231,555
São Francisco	Acre	Amazon	2001	21,148
São Francisco de Paula	Rio Grande do Sul	Atlantic Forest	1968	1,615
Saracá-Taquera	Pará	Amazon	1989	441,283
Silvânia	Goiás	Cerrado	2001	486
Sobral	Ceará	Caatinga	2001	661
Tapajós	Pará	Amazon	1974	530,621
Tapirapé-Aquiri	Pará	Amazon	1989	196,502
Tefé	Amazonas	Amazon	1989	865,122
Três Barras	Santa Catarina	Atlantic Forest	1968	4,385
Trairão	Pará	Amazon	2006	257,529
Urupadi	Amazonas	Amazon	2016	537,228
