= WHP Posttranscriptional Response Element =

DNA Sequence

Woodchuck Hepatitis Virus (WHV) Posttranscriptional Regulatory Element (WPRE) is a DNA sequence that, when transcribed, creates a tertiary structure enhancing expression. The sequence is commonly used in molecular biology to increase expression of genes delivered by viral vectors. WPRE is a tripartite regulatory element with gamma, alpha, and beta components. The alpha component is 80bp long:

GCCACGGCGGAACTCATCGCCGCCTGCCTTGCCCGCTGCTGGACAGGGGCTCGGCTGTTGGGCACTGACAATTCCGTGGT

When used alone without the gamma and beta WPRE components, the alpha component is only 9% as active as the full tripartite WPRE. The sequence for full tripartite WPRE is:

AATCAACCTCTGGATTACAAAATTTGTGAAAGATTGACTGGTATTCTTAACTATGTTGCTCCTTTTACGCTATGTGGATACGCTGCTTTAATGCCTTTGTA
TCATGCTATTGCTTCCCGTATGGCTTTCATTTTCTCCTCCTTGTATAAATCCTGGTTGCTGTCTCTTTATGAGGAGTTGTGGCCCGTTGTCAGGCAACGTGGCGTG
GTGTGCACTGTGTTTGCTGACGCAACCCCCACTGGTTGGGGCATTGCCACCACCTGTCAGCTCCTTTCCGGGACTTTCGCTTTCCCCCTCCCTATTGCCACGGCGG
AACTCATCGCCGCCTGCCTTGCCCGCTGCTGGACAGGGGCTCGGCTGTTGGGCACTGACAATTCCGTGGTGTTGTCGGGGAAGCTGACGTCCTTTCCATGGCTGCT
CGCCTGTGTTGCCACCTGGATTCTGCGCGGGACGTCCTTCTGCTACGTCCCTTCGGCCCTCAATCCAGCGGACCTTCCTTCCCGCGGCCTGCTGCCGGCTCTGCGG
CCTCTTCCGCGTCTTCGCCTTCGCCCTCAGACGAGTCGGATCTCCCTTTGGGCCGCCTCCCCGCCTG

This sequence has 100% homology with base pairs 1093 to 1684 of the Woodchuck hepatitis B virus (WHV8) genome. When used in the 3' untranslated region (UTR) of a mammalian expression cassette, it can significantly increase mRNA stability and protein yield.
