= Ground squirrel hepatitis virus =

Virus classification
- (unranked): Virus
- Realm: Riboviria
- Kingdom: Pararnavirae
- Phylum: Artverviricota
- Class: Revtraviricetes
- Order: Blubervirales
- Family: Hepadnaviridae
- Genus: Orthohepadnavirus
- Species: Orthohepadnavirus sciuri

Species of virus

Ground squirrel hepatitis virus, abbreviated GSHV, is a partially double-stranded DNA virus that is closely related to human Hepatitis B virus (HBV) and Woodchuck hepatitis virus (WHV). It is a member of the family of viruses Hepadnaviridae and the genus Orthohepadnavirus. Like the other members of its family, GSHV has high degree of species and tissue specificity. It was discovered in Beechey ground squirrels, Spermophilus beecheyi, but also infects Arctic ground squirrels, Spermophilus parryi. Commonalities between GSHV and HBV include morphology, DNA polymerase activity in genome repair, cross-reacting viral antigens, and the resulting persistent infection with viral antigen in the blood (antigenemia). As a result, GSHV is used as an experimental model for HBV.

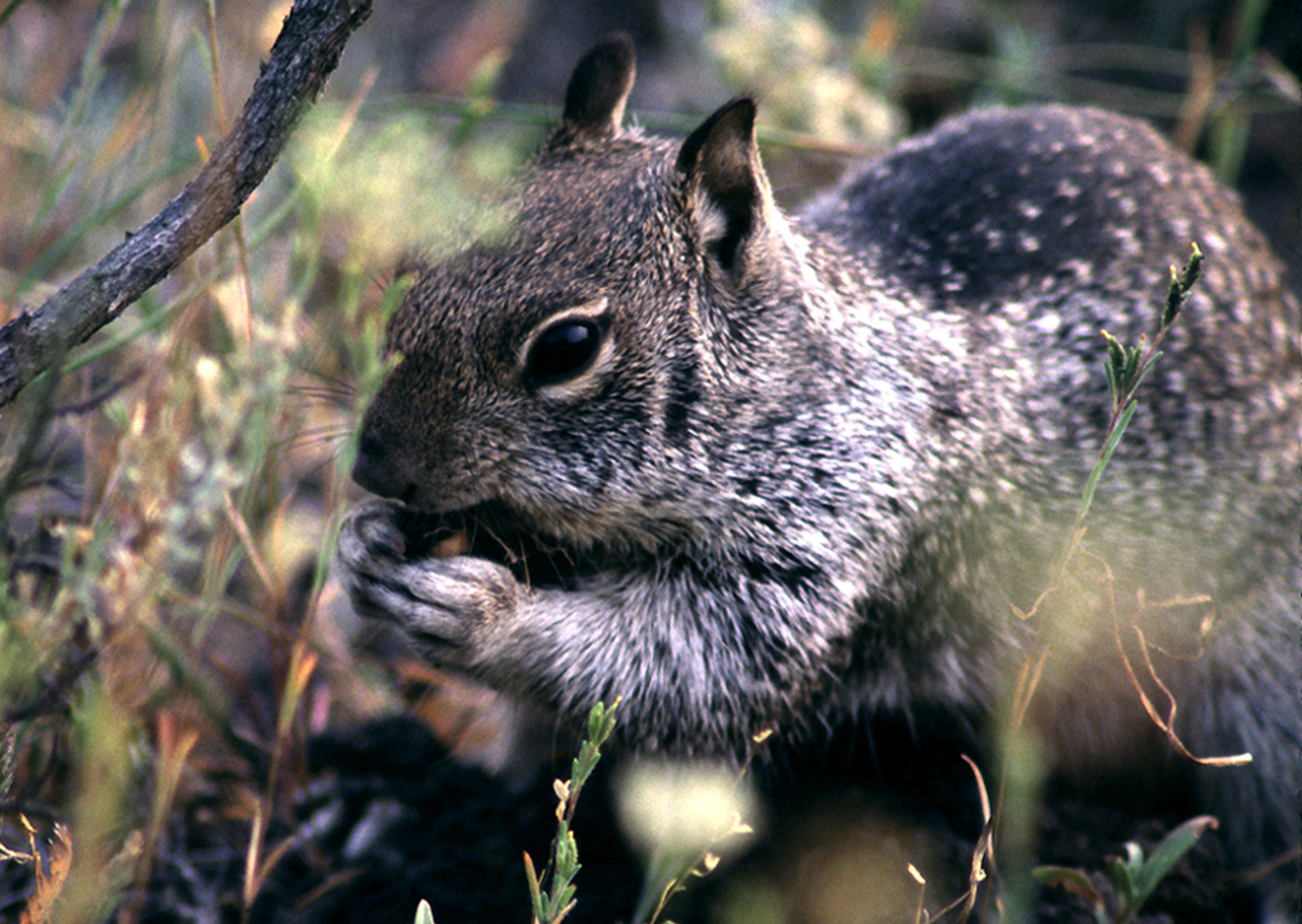
The species GSHV was originally isolated from, Spermophilus beecheyi, commonly known as California ground squirrel.

== Morphology ==
=== Genome ===
Ground squirrel hepatitis virus consists of a DNA genome is primarily double-stranded. Like other hepadnaviruses, it consists of a single-stranded region of variable length that is converted to double-stranded DNA by virion DNA polymerase. A protein is covalently bound to the 5' end of the minus strand which may be used as a primer for DNA synthesis.

There are four evident open reading frames within the genome, all on the same strand. Two are for the genes encoding the structural proteins (surface antigens and core antigens), and the other two are unassigned. The larger of the unassigned frames, which is called gene A and covers 80% of the genome, is predicted to encode the viral DNA polymerase.

Inside a host cell, the GSHV genome can exist in two forms: a circular duplex and heterogenous partially single-stranded DNA. Circular DNA can be either covalently closed or open.

The GSHV genome is very similar to the related hepadnaviruses. Ground squirrel hepatitis is 3311 base pairs in length, making the size indistinguishable from HBV. GSHV has greater nucleotide and amino acid homology with WHV than HBV, with 82% nucleotide and 78% amino acid homology between GSHV and WHV and 55% nucleotide and 46% amino acid homology between GSHV and HBV. The open reading frames of GSHV are similar to HBV and WHV, but the viruses differ in their EcoRI restriction enzyme recognition sites.

=== Structure ===
Ground squirrel hepatitis virus is a spherical, enveloped virus. The core particle, or nucleocapsid, contains e antigen, viral DNA, and an endogenous DNA polymerase. The virus particles contain two major structural proteins, surface antigens (sAg) and core antigens (cAg). Both proteins were identified based on homology with analogous proteins in other hepadnaviruses. Mature ground squirrel hepatitis sAg (GSHsAg) had 90% amino acid homology with woodchuck hepatitis sAg and is believed to be glycosylated. The ground squirrel hepatitis cAg (GSHcAg) is the most highly conserved protein sequence between GSHV, WHV, and HBV.

== Replication Cycle ==
=== Viral Entry ===
It is thought that hepadnaviruses enter host cells through receptor-mediated endocytosis.

=== Replication and Transcription ===
The intracellular predomination of the long minus strand of DNA over the short plus strand suggests DNA replication proceeds from an RNA template, like other hepadnaviruses. It is predicted that synthesis of the minus strand utilizes an RNA intermediate that is degraded as it is copied, and the plus strand is synthesized using the complete minus strand DNA. Viral DNA polymerase synthesizes both the plus and minus DNA strands. The production of an RNA intermediate, called the pregenome, during replication involves a reverse transcription step resembling that of retroviruses. Hepadnaviruses differ from retroviruses in that the intermediate form of the genome is RNA instead of DNA. Also, integration into the host genome is not necessary for replication in hepadnaviruses. This process was first shown in Duck Hepatitis B Virus (DHBV), a related virus in the Hepadnaviridae family in which the minus DNA strands also outnumber the plus strands. This similarity suggests the replication mechanism is similar in GSHV.

Following entry, the partial DNA duplex genome is repaired by the viral DNA polymerase and circularized to serve as the template for transcription. The four transcripts are made in the nucleus and are generally transported to the cytoplasm.

=== Assembly ===
It is predicted that viral DNA is packaged before synthesis of the plus strand is complete. This would explain the excess minus strand DNA compared to plus strand DNA.

== Infection and Disease ==
Ground squirrel hepatitis virus is distinguished from related viruses by its lack of pathogenic effect, even though it is common for infected hosts to have high titers of circulating virions. The viral particles detected in the sera of wild Beechey ground squirrels are molecularly and structurally similar, but not identical to HBV. In general, GSHV particles in sera are larger than HBV particles. A filamentous virus particle was the most abundant form in ground squirrel sera much like human sera infected with HBV. The next most abundant particle in sera was spherical with an outer shell or envelope, resembling the Dane particles found in humans.

=== Tropism ===
Ground squirrel hepatitis virus infects liver cells and is considered highly hepatotropic. Infection with GSHV can cause persistent infection. The virus causes chronic infection and longer antigenemia (antigen in the blood) when it is injected directly into the liver compared to injection into the portal vein. GSHsAg (viral surface antigen) can be detected in the serum several weeks post infection.

=== Associated disease ===
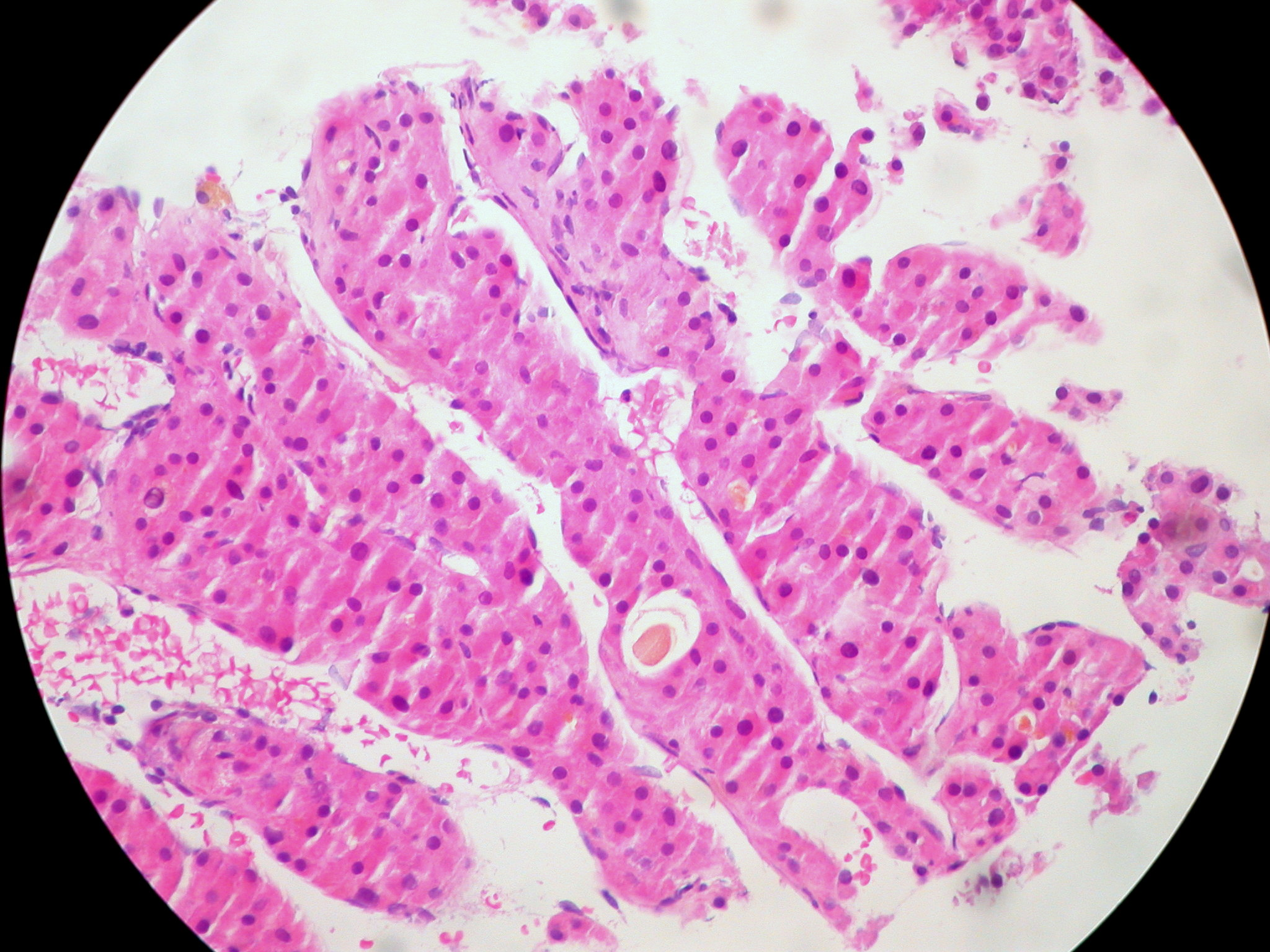
Hepatocellular carcinoma cells

Illness or death in GSHV bearing animals due to liver disease has not been shown. In many infected squirrels with high GSHsAg and virion DNA polymerase levels, there are no signs of cirrhosis or hepatocellular carcinoma. It is possible for ground squirrels persistently infected with GSHV to exhibit signs of mild, nonprogressive hepatitis. No modulation of host processes as a result of GSHV infection is known.

Persistent infection with HBV and WHV often results in hepatocellular carcinoma (HCC). The same association has not been observed with GSHV, but it is possible that persistent infection over a time period longer than required of the other two viruses may contribute to the development of HCC. Persistent infection with GSHV for up to three years only results in slight inflammation, so the development of HCC would presumably take longer in most cases.

== Transmission ==
Ground squirrel hepatitis virus can be transmitted both horizontally and vertically.

Horizontal transmission can result from inoculation with viremic serum. However, the concentration of serum necessary to transmit infection is much higher than what would be predicted using the assumption that one viral particle is sufficient to initiate infection. One potential explanation for this may be that not every particle detected by physical methods is biologically active, and another explanation is that multiple virions are required to initiate infection.

Vertical transmission of GSHV from mother to newborn is also possible but has not been studied extensively.

== Distribution ==
Geographic distribution can be measured by testing the sera of ground squirrels for viral surface antigen, virion DNA polymerase, and virus antibodies at different locations. It is thought that the distribution of GSHV is very localized. It was found in a radius smaller than eight miles in northern California, but it is likely that it exists in undetected places. Additional evidence suggests that the geographic distribution is uneven, which is the case for HBV. There are no indications of factors that may influence geographic distribution of GSHV.

No differences in sex distributions of GSHV have been observed. This is unlike HBV in which persistent HBV infections in males outnumbers infections in females.
