= Conservation in Brazil =

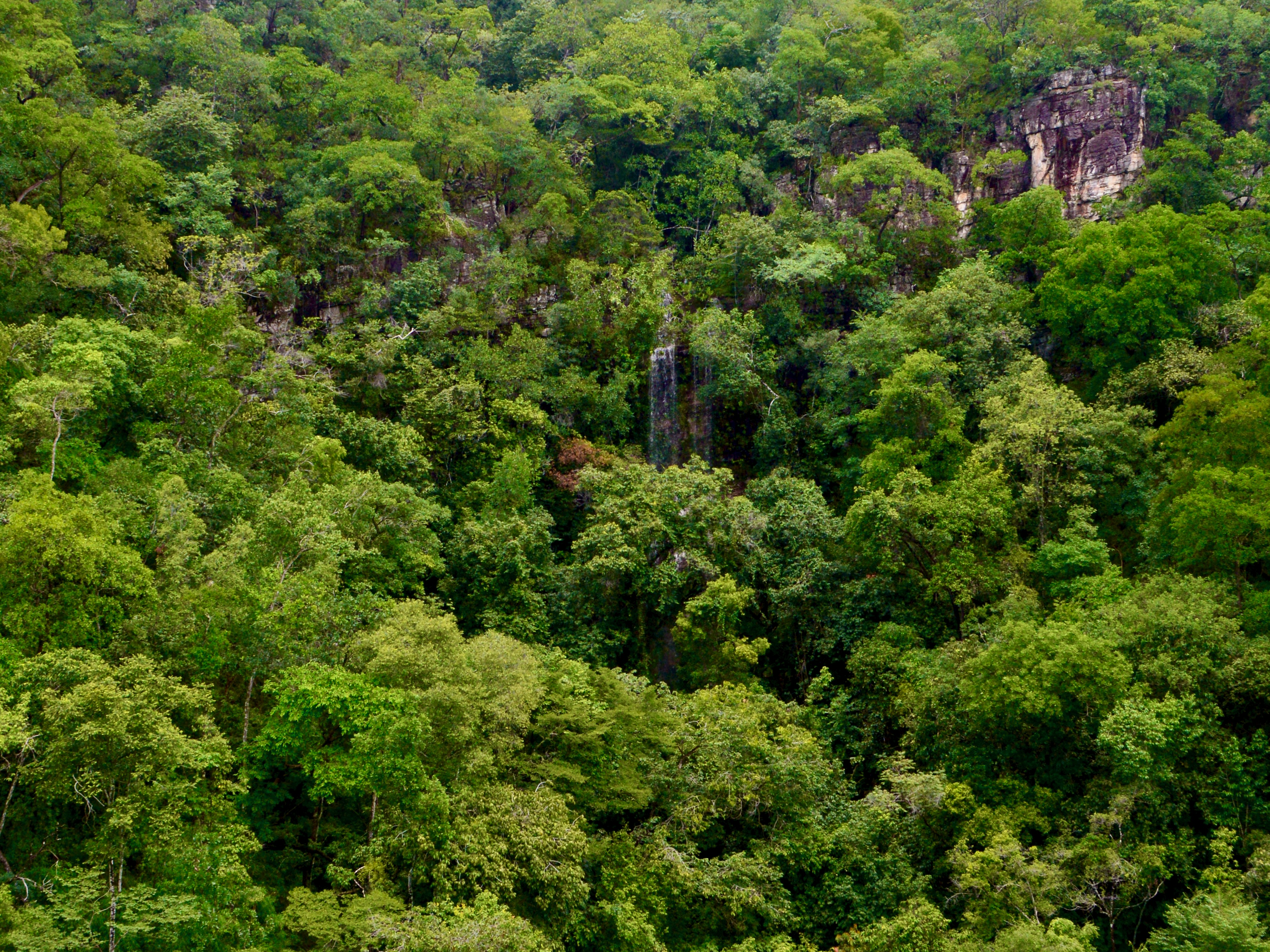
Chapada dos Veadeiros National Park

Even though progress has been made in conserving Brazil’s landscapes, the country still faces serious threats due to its historical land use. Amazonian forests substantially influence regional and global climates and deforesting this region is both a regional and global driver of climate change due to the high amounts of deforestation and habitat fragmentation that have occurred this region.

Brazil has established an extensive network of protected areas which covers more than 2 million km2(25% of Brazil's national territory) and is divided almost equally between protected natural areas or conservation units and indigenous land ("Terras Indígenas"). Despite these measures, environmental protection is still a concern as indigenous tribes and Brazilian environmental activists contend with ranchers, illegal loggers, gold and oil prospectors and drug traffickers who continue to illegally clear forests.

== Deforestation ==
Home to much of the Amazon rainforest, Brazil's tropical primary (old-growth) forest loss greatly exceeds that of other countries.

Overall, 20% of the Amazon rainforest has been "transformed" (deforested) and another 6% has been "highly degraded", with Brazil having the highest percentage deforested or highly degraded of any Amazonia nation.

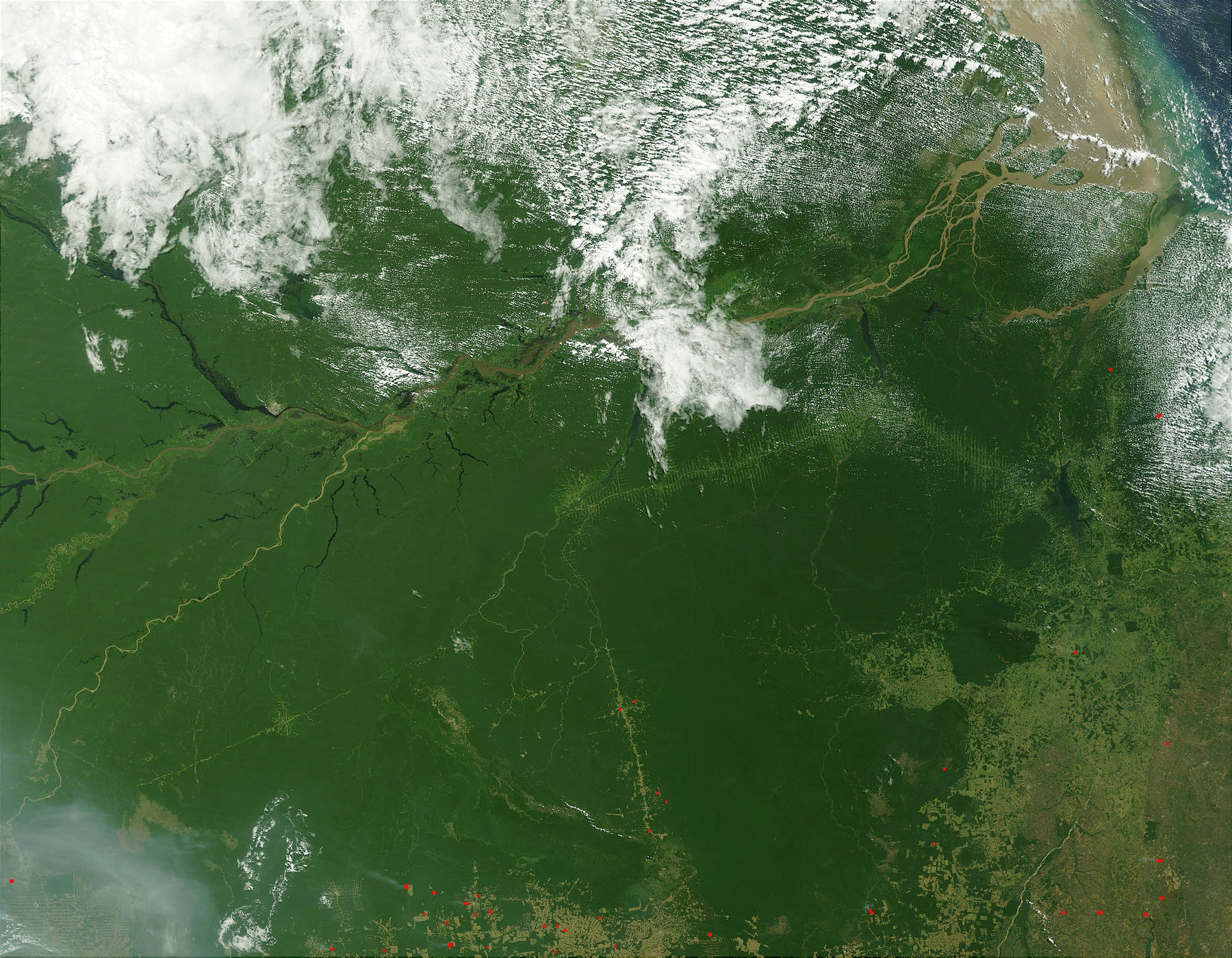
"At bottom right and bottom center, deforestation and cultivation are evident by the regular, rectangular shapes that delineate plots."

More than one-fifth of the Amazon Rainforest in Brazil has been completely destroyed, and more than 70 mammals are endangered. The threat of extinction comes from several sources, including deforestation and poaching. Extinction is even more problematic in the Atlantic Forest, where nearly 93% of the forest has been cleared. Of the 202 endangered animals in Brazil, 171 are in the Atlantic Forest.

The Amazon rainforest has been under direct threat of deforestation since the 1970s because of rapid economic and demographic expansion. Extensive legal and illegal logging destroy forests the size of a small country per year, and with it a diverse series of species through habitat destruction and habitat fragmentation. Since 1970, over 600,000 square kilometers (230,000 sq mi) of the Amazon Rainforest have been cleared by logging.

=== Cattle ranching ===
In 1960-1970, the country started to expand its infrastructure in empty areas of the country, to guarantee its occupation: at the time wars, colonizations and invasions of territories were common in the world, and Brazil wanted to ensure that the Amazon was not invaded by other countries on the grounds that it is an abandoned region, without human occupation. The area of the Amazon, as it is proven to be rich in diverse ores, fresh water and all kinds of natural resources, awaits greed from dozens of countries in the world. Livestock and agriculture have never been very strong in the Amazon: the area has a bad soil and climate for planting, and cattle, although they reach the margins of the forest, are actually spread throughout the country, being the areas that have less cattle throughout Brazil, coastal regions and the Amazon. States like Goiás, Mato Grosso do Sul and Minas Gerais have a lot of cattle.

=== Soybean production ===
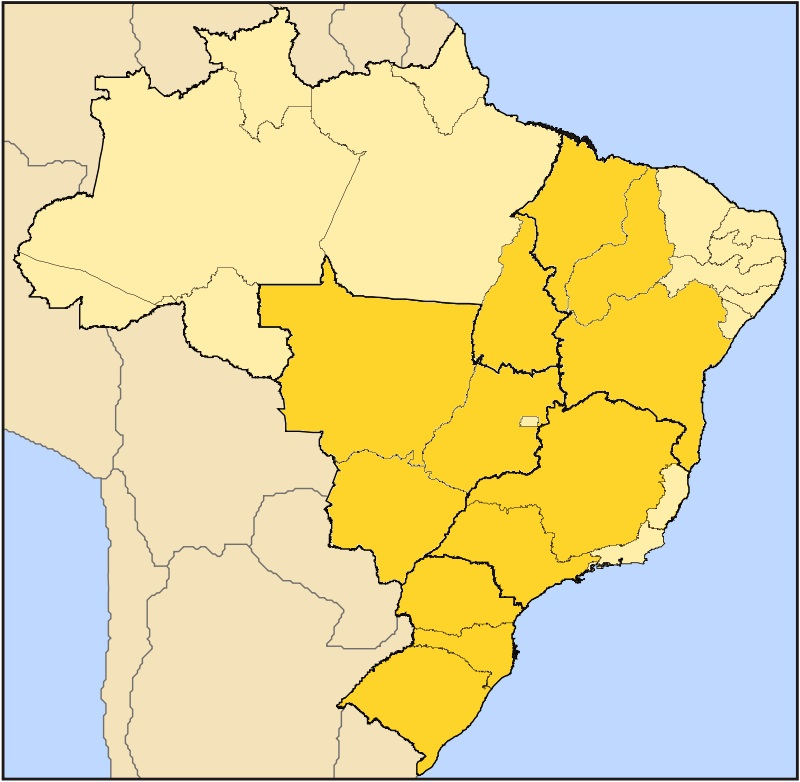
Soy production in Brazil is practiced outside the Amazon.

After the United States, Brazil is the second largest produce of soybeans. Soybean production, like cattle ranching, requires ample land and because of its profitability and importance as an export, receives large governmental support.. As stated in the Constitution of Brazil, clearing land for crops or fields is considered an ‘effective use’ of land and has resulted in massive expansions of infrastructure aimed at providing greater access to unused land. However, the Amazonian soil is of very low quality for plantations: it has few nutrients and the soil is sterile after two or three years of planting. In 2020, only 5% of the country's agricultural production came from the Northern Region. Most of the soy plantation in the country is practiced in the region of Cerrado, a savanna with little vegetation that was barren and where agriculture was impractical until a few years ago. Thanks to EMBRAPA, Brazil adapted plants for cultivation in this region, since Brazil has many terrible biomes for the practice of agriculture and livestock, such as the Semi-Arid Region of the Northeast, the Amazon Forest itself or the mountainous plateaus in the Southeast.

=== Timber ===
The export of tree trunks native to the Amazon (selling fresh wood, that is, without any type of processing), is an illegal activity in Brazil. However, it is common to see, in Europe, the sale of furniture produced with illegal Brazilian woods, such as jacaranda and mahogany. Timber arrives illegally in Europe and the countries of the continent do not take action to block these imports.

In 2007 Brazilian president Luiz Inácio Lula da Silva announced at the International Conference on Biofuels in Brussels that Brazil's deforestation rate had dramatically slowed due to efficient fuel production and setting aside over 20 million hectares of forest. Since 2004 Brazil has established more than 200,000 square kilometres of parks, nature reserves, and national forests in the Amazon rainforest. These protected areas, if fully enforced, will prevent an estimated one billion tons of carbon emissions from being transferred to the atmosphere through deforestation by the year 2015.

=== Poaching ===
According to a 2001 report by Rede, or RENC, (Portuguese for "National Network Against the Trafficking of Wild Animals"), wildlife smuggling is Brazil's third most profitable illegal activity, after arms dealing and drug smuggling. RENCTAS believes that the poachers are taking an estimated 38 million birds, reptiles and other animals from the wild each year. The same report claims that police only intercept .5% of smuggled animal wildlife and that it is incredibly easy to successfully smuggle animals throughout Brazil. Some motivations behind poaching are to acquire animals that can be used as exotic pets, or whose parts are used as trophies. Regardless of purpose, poaching can also jeopardize local food security, as hunters are regulated and trained such that their activities will not jeopardize the local ecosystem balance. Poaching can then shift that engineered balance, leading to harsher regulation of local hunting to offset the increased strain placed on the ecosystem. This can directly affect livelihoods, especially among those that hunt legitimately for food to support themselves.

While most focus on poaching regards that within the Amazon because of the roughly 60% which resides in Brazil, other forested locations are also impacted. The remnants of tabuleiro forests, especially isolated patches of them, are frequent locations of poaching activities. Within these separated sections, there is no way for natural replacement of species after a certain threshold. This can result in sections of forest becoming near-completely devoid of animal life, especially regarding frequently targeted animals like birds and big cats. An example is the sub-region of Serra do Mar of São Paulo, where the population of wild mammals has decreased by 98%. Recovery from such complete ecological deprivation is near-impossible, and assisted repopulation is only effective if these locations receive more protection than they had before.

=== Invasive species ===
Native wildlife are threatened by some invasive species. There have been more than 300 documented invasive species in Brazil. It is estimated that invasive species cost Brazil around $49 billion. The most threatening species is the wild boar which destroys crops and natural flora, and can transmit diseases to indigenous animals. Also damaging the natural habitat are African grasses and snails. The Brazilian Institute of Environment and Renewable Natural Resources (IBAMA) has put restrictions on what species may be brought into the country.

=== Endangered Species ===
Brazil is home to over 6% of the world's endangered species. According to a species assessment conducted by the IUCN Red List of Endangered Species, 97 species have been identified in Brazil with vulnerable, lower risk/near threatened, endangered, or critically endangered standing. In 2009, 769 endangered species were identified in Brazil, making it home to the eighth largest number of endangered species in the world. For Brazil, and the countries that precede it, high rates of deforestation, industrialization, and urbanization explain the growing number of endangered species in extremely bio-diverse areas. According to Carlos Minc, Brazil's Environment Minister, protected areas are increasingly populated by humans and preservation areas are lacking the essential protection they need. Industries involved in deforestation play large roles in degrading and destroying lands that are incredibly sensitive to changes in their ecosystem. By 2020, it is estimated that at least 50% of the species resident in Brazil will become extinct.

== Conservation efforts ==
=== Brazilian Forest Code ===
From the 1990s through 2004, the Brazilian Forest Code (FC) was the primary and most prolific legal restriction of forest clearing on private lands. The FC established that 50% of each private property must be managed as forest reserve and retain its natural composition. However, in 1996 the minimum required reserve proportion was increased to 80%. While this seemed a protective change, it has been difficult to accurately detect illegal land use, which makes enforcement extremely difficult.

The profitability of soy production in Brazil drastically fell from 2005–2006, which resulted in a reduction in the amount of land planted with soy in the Brazilian Amazon. In 2004, the Detection of Deforestation in Real Time (DETER) was launched, which provided a system for detecting and responding to events of deforestation. The Amazon Region Protected Areas Program resulted in a 68% increase in protected areas and indigenous territories from 2004- 2012. Many of these newly protected areas were created in active agricultural frontiers.

Since 2005 the annual rate of deforestation in Brazil has continued to decline while soy and beef production have continued to rise.

=== Rise of ethanol ===
The first use of ethanol as a fuel source came from the emergence of the automobile in Brazil during the 1920s. Ethanol production peaked during World War II because German submarines threatened oil supplies and the Brazilian government, in turn, looked for alternative fuel sources. Gasoline was heavily favored until the 1973 global oil shock made clear Brazil's dangerous dependence on foreign oil. In response, the Brazilian government began promoting bioethanol as an alternative fuel. The National Alcohol Program -Pró-Álcool- (Portuguese: 'Programa Nacional do Álcool'), launched in 1975, was a nationwide program financed by the government to phase out automobile fuels derived from fossil fuels, such as gasoline, in favor of ethanol produced from sugar cane. This large-scale shift to ethanol initially focused on the amount of ethanol mixed with gasoline. The percent of ethanol in gasoline fluctuated greatly from 10% to 22% between 1976 and 1992 until a federal law established a mandatory blend of 22% anhydrous ethanol for the entire country. The percentage of ethanol mixed with gasoline has continued to change throughout the 21st century because of changing supply of sugarcane, making it possible for mixtures even within the same year to differ from 20-25%.

The Brazilian government has worked with both public and private sectors to provide incentive for creative inventions that would make the most use of Brazil's ethanol boom. After testing in government fleets with several prototypes developed by local carmakers, and compelled by the second oil crisis, the Fiat 147, the first modern commercial neat ethanol car (E100 only) was launched to the market in July 1979. In order to establish ethanol as an alternative to gasoline, the Brazilian government provided three important initial drivers for the ethanol industry: guaranteed purchases by the state-owned oil company Petrobras, low-interest loans for agro-industrial ethanol firms, and fixed gasoline and ethanol prices where hydrous ethanol sold for 59% of the government-set gasoline price at the pump. Brazil's increased energy independence has allowed greater competitiveness between foreign oil producers, making gasoline even cheaper for Brazilians.

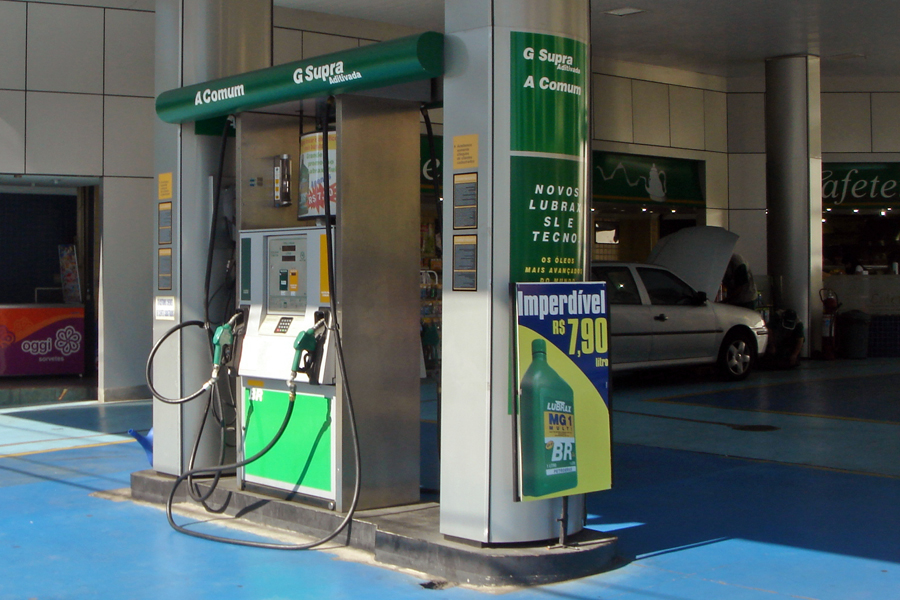
Brazil has ethanol fuel available throughout the country. Shown here a typical Petrobras gas station at São Paulo with dual fuel service, marked A for alcohol (ethanol) and G for gasoline.

In 2011 Brazil produced 21.1 billion liters of ethanol (5.57 billion liquid gallons), representing 24.9 percent of the world's total ethanol used as fuel. The Brazilian model for success in ethanol, however, is hard to replicate because of Brazil's large amount of arable land and advanced agri-industrial technology. For the past four decades, Brazil has taken serious steps to move towards greater energy security and federal environmental protection by advancing ethanol production as a complement to oil.

Brazil's ethanol fuel program is based on the most efficient method of cultivating sugar cane in the world. Using modern equipment and cheap sugar cane as feedstock, residual cane-waste (bagasse) is used to produce heat and power, resulting in competitive prices for energy. The balance of energy, or the input vs. output of energy, is extremely high when using this method and results anywhere from 8.3 (average conditions) and 10.1 (optimum). This creates an almost negative energy balance that actually reduces more carbon emissions in the atmosphere as the sugarcane is growing than it produces when it is being burned. In 2010, the U.S. EPA designated Brazil's sugarcane ethanol as an advanced biofuel because of its 61% reduction of total life cycle greenhouse gas emissions, including direct indirect land use change emissions.

Brazil's widespread use and production of ethanol has had substantial benefits for Brazil's economy and environment. Studies have shown that up to 85% of greenhouse gas emissions are cut because of the switch from gasoline. Land use, with specific regard to growing sugarcane, remains a concern for the environment. As producers of sugarcane continue to mass-produce within the same soil, nutrients that get replenished naturally are harder to come by; soil is not as fertile as it used to be. Though land use for the production of sugarcane continues to be an issue, the EPA has concluded that sugarcane ethanol from Brazil reduces greenhouse gas emissions as compared to gasoline by 61%, using a 30-year payback for indirect land use change (ILUC) emissions. Another 2010 study published by the World Bank found that "Brazil's transport sector has a lower carbon intensity compared to that of most other countries because of its widespread use of ethanol as a fuel for vehicles."

== Institutional response: policy solutions ==
The Brazilian government has responded to decades of high rates of deforestation and extremely environmentally harmful practices with macro level decisions that have impacted Brazil's culture, economy, and environment. While some policies to reduce carbon emissions and deforestation are responses to economic tendencies, such as the rise of ethanol, others are motivated by locally organized non-governmental agencies and citizens alike.

=== Government and NGOs ===
The Ministry of Environment is responsible for Brazil's national environmental policy. The ministry's many departments deal with climate change and environmental quality, biodiversity and forests, water resources, sustainable urban and rural development, and environmental citizenship. Other authorities are also responsible for the implementation of environmental policies, including the National Council on the Environment, the National Council of the Amazon, the National Council of Water Resources, the Chico Mendes Institute for Biodiversity Conservation (ICMBIO), Brazilian Institute of Environment and Renewable Natural Resources (IBAMA), Board of Management of Public Forests, and others. The collaborative work of these institutions makes it possible to ensure sustainable growth within the means of the environment.

The development of institutions at the governmental level was stimulated and accompanied by the diffusion and increasing importance of NGOs dedicated to environmental causes and sustainable development. Numerous NGOs throughout Brazil produce documents containing both useful information and criticisms of policies that are continuously harmful to Brazil's environment. NGOs on the ground have held the Brazilian government accountable to their policies of conservation and serve to inform and advocate for the localities they are based in.

Name	Foundation Year	Mission
SOS Mata Atlântica	1986	Defend the Atlantic Forest areas, protect the communities that inhabit the region, and preserve their natural, historical, and cultural heritage.
Socio Environmental Institute	1994	Defend rights related to the environment, cultural heritage, and human rights.
Greenpeace		Defend the environment by raising awareness about environmental issues and influence people to change their habits.
WWF-Brasil	1996	Instruct Brazilian society on how to use natural resources in a rational manner.
Conservation International (CI)	1987	Protect biodiversity and instruct society on how to live in harmony with nature.
Akatu Institute		Guide Brazil's consumption habits toward a sustainable model.
Ecoar Institute	After Rio-92	Provide environmental education as an effort to rescue degraded areas and implement local sustainable development programs and projects.
Ecoa	1989	Create a space for negotiations and decisions about environmental protection and sustainability.
Recicloteca		Diffuse information on environmental issues, especially for the reduction, reutilization, and recycling of waste.
Friends of the Earth-Brazilian Amazon	1989	Develop projects and activities that promote sustainable development in the Amazonian region.
National Network to Fight the Trafficking of Wild Animals (Renctas)	1999	Combat the trafficking of wild animals and contribute to biodiversity protection.
Atlantic Forest NGO Network		Provide information about NGOs that work toward the protection of the Atlantic Forest.
Brazilian Forum of NGOs and Social Movements for the Environment and Development (FBOMS)	1990	Facilitate the participation of the public in the United Nations Conference on Environment (UNCED).
Brazilian Foundation for Sustainable Development (FBDS)	1992	Implement the conventions and treaties approved at Rio-92.

=== National System of Nature Conservation Units - SNUC ===
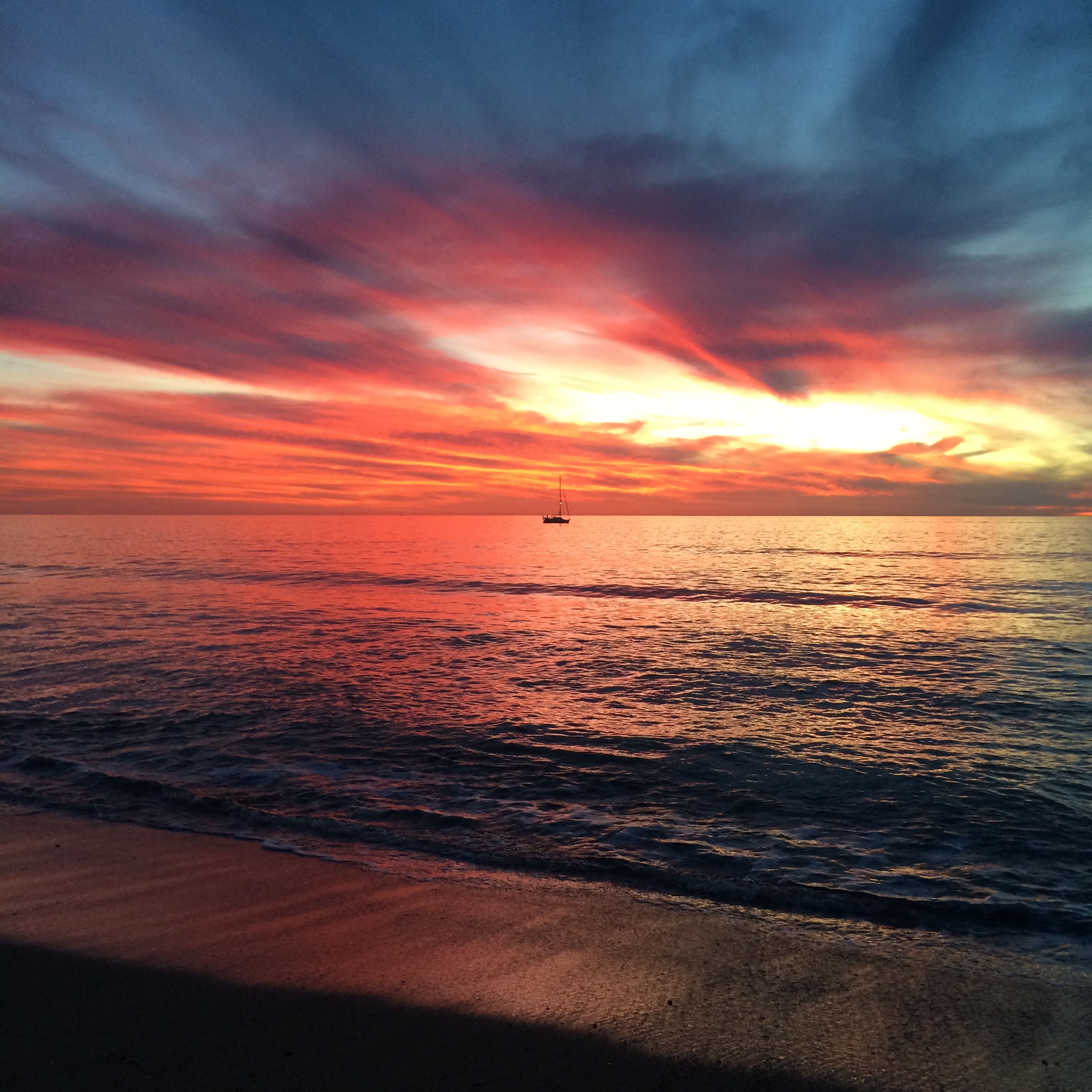
A beach in the federally protected Park of Dunes, located in Rio Grande do Norte

Brazil's 1988 Federal Constitution promotes an "ecologically balanced environment", as defined in article 225 on the environment, and vests the Brazilian government the responsibility of defending and preserving it. From this constitutional prerogative, Brazil has created the National System of Nature Conservation Units (Sistema Nacional de Unidades de Conservação - SNUC), through the Federal Law No. 9.985/2000 to devise a plan for sustainable development and land conservation.

Basically, SNUC divides protected areas into two groups: Full protection and sustainable use. Each group contains diverse categories of units.

- Full protection - Ecological station, Biological reserve, National park, Natural monument, and Wildlife refuge
- Sustainable use - Environmental protection area, Area of relevant ecological interest, National forest, Extractive reserve, Wildlife reserve, Sustainable development reserve, and Private natural heritage reserve.

In order to have flexibility on its land use policies, Brazil has created a dynamic system of regulations that promote and require sustainability practices be implemented. These are innovative frameworks as they offer the community the possibility to participate in decision-making and to apply financial mechanisms that make the system viable, as well as encouraging the conservation of natural environments. According to UNESCO's office in Brasilia, Brazil "has a little over 1,600 federal, state and private Conservation Units (CUs) that protect 16% of the continental territory and 0.5% of the marine area, which corresponds to 1,479,286 square kilometers."

== See also ==
- Wildlife of Brazil
- List of national parks of Brazil
- List of Brazilian National Forests
- Deforestation in Brazil
- Amazon River
- History of ethanol fuel in Brazil
- Slavery in Brazil
- Environmental issues in Brazil
