= Woolly monkey hepatitis B virus =

Virus classification
- (unranked): Virus
- Realm: Riboviria
- Kingdom: Pararnavirae
- Phylum: Artverviricota
- Class: Revtraviricetes
- Order: Blubervirales
- Family: Hepadnaviridae
- Genus: Orthohepadnavirus
- Species: Orthohepadnavirus lagothricis

Species of virus

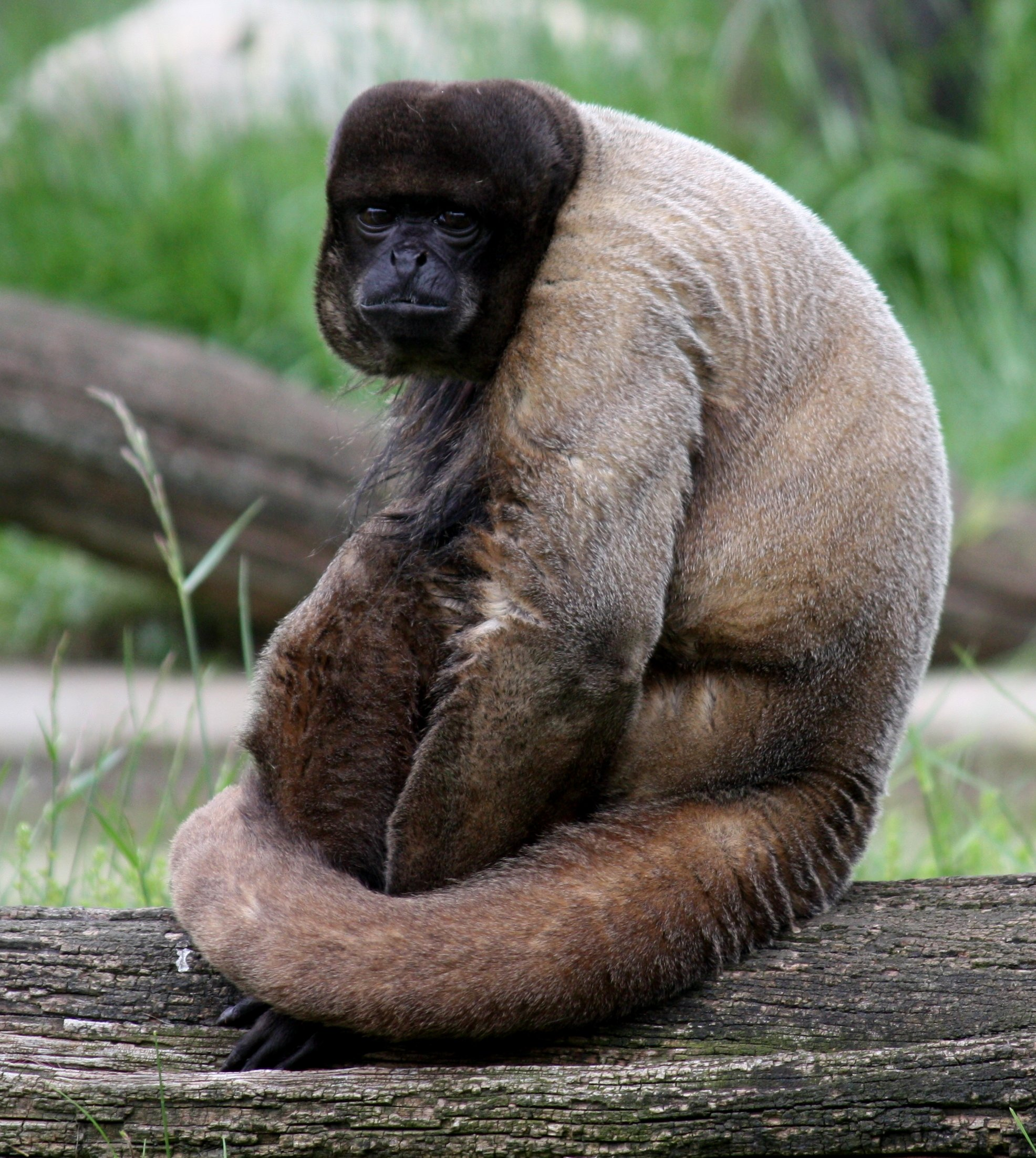
The woolly monkey, Lagothrix, is known as a New World primate, found across different regions of South America. Most species of Lagothrix are endangered.

The woolly monkey hepatitis B virus (WMHBV) is a viral species of the Orthohepadnavirus genus of the Hepadnaviridae family. Its natural host is the woolly monkey (Lagothrix), an inhabitant of South America categorized as a New World primate. WMHBV, like other hepatitis viruses, infects the hepatocytes, or liver cells, of its host organism. It can cause hepatitis, liver necrosis, cirrhosis, and hepatocellular carcinoma (liver cancer). Because nearly all species of Lagothrix are threatened or endangered, researching and developing a vaccine and/or treatment for WMHBV is important for the protection of the whole woolly monkey genus.

WMHBV is also of great interest to researchers because of its potential to teach us more about the human hepatitis B virus (HBV). WMHBV is a distant phylogenetic sister species to human HBV, although the evolutionary history of hepatitis B viruses is not well understood. Additionally, WMHBV was the first hepadnavirus other than human HBV that was known to infect non-human primates. The discovery of WMHBV opened up the possibility of developing a primate model for HBV, since prior, most hepatitis B research was done with duck or woodchuck models. Since the discovery of WMHBV, another primate-infecting hepadnavirus has been discovered: capuchin monkey hepatitis B virus (CMHBV). Both CMHBV and WMHBV have potential to play an important role in the development of human hepatitis B treatments.

== Isolation ==
Woolly monkey hepatitis B virus was isolated in 1998 from serum samples of a brown woolly monkey (Lagothrix lagotricha) that was suffering from fulminant hepatitis at the Louisville Zoo. Discovery of this pathogen was extremely concerning because the Louisville Zoo was home to a very successful woolly monkey breeding program. They immediately tested all sixteen members of their woolly monkey colony and found that nine were chronically infected with the virus, and another four showed signs of previously having the virus, which was identifiable via the presence of serum antibodies to HBV surface antigen (HBsAg). Thus, thirteen out of the sixteen woolly monkeys appeared to have been exposed to the virus. Analysis of archived woolly monkey sera at the Louisville Zoo suggested that the WMHBV was present in the colony for at least nine years before its discovery. Eighteen other woolly monkeys from four zoos across the country were tested for WMHBV, and the results came back negative.

== Morphology ==
=== Genome ===
A member of the Hepadnaviridae family, WMHBV has a partially double-stranded, partially single-stranded circular DNA genome. Its genome is 3,179 nucleotides in length, and encodes 5 proteins: the capsid (core) protein, the large envelope protein (L glycoprotein), the external core antigen, protein P (polymerase), and protein x (multifunctional protein). The polymerase open reading frame (ORF) is the largest ORF in the genome, and has significant overlap with each of the other genes, perhaps constraining its evolutionary properties. Although WMHBV is considerably divergent from the human hepatitis B virus (HBV), they share the same genetic organization. The core gene of WMHBV was the most similar to human HBV with 85.8-86.9% similarity at the amino acid level, while the WHMBV X gene was most divergent from human HBV with only 64.3-65.6% similarity at the amino acid level.

=== Structure ===
Woolly monkey hepatitis B virus is similar in structure to other Orthohepadnaviridae. Mature virions are enveloped, and consist of an icosahedral capsid. The majority of virions consist of 240 capsid proteins and display T=4 symmetry, however, a small amount of virions consist of 180 capsid proteins and display T=3 symmetry. The envelope surrounding the capsid is derived from the host membrane. L glycoproteins line the surface of the envelope and play a role in viral attachment to cell receptors. The virions are small, approximately 42 nm in diameter.

== Replication cycle ==
=== Entry into cell ===
It has been found that sodium taurocholate cotransporting polypeptide (NTCP), a sodium/bile acid symporter found in the cellular membrane of hepatocytes, acts as a cellular receptor for WMHBV, as well as many other hepadnaviruses. Following attachment to the NTCP, WMHBV enters into the cell cytoplasm via endocytosis, and the large envelope protein ensures fusion between the endosomal membrane and the viral membrane.

=== Replication and transcription ===
Replication and transcription of the WMHBV has not been extensively studied, but is believed to occur very similarly to all other HBV including human HBV. Once inside the cell, nuclear localization signals on the capsid protein allow the capsid to bind to importin α-importin β complexes. The genome is released from the capsid at the nuclear pore complex, and enters into the nucleus. Inside, the viral polymerase protein is released and ligates the DNA so that it becomes covalently closed circular DNA, or cccDNA. The cccDNA then binds nucleosomes and acts as the host DNA.

The cccDNA is then transcribed to RNA via host cell RNA polymerase. Many RNAs are shipped to the cytoplasm where the proteins are assembled, including a large number of empty capsids. Reverse transcription by the viral polymerase protein re-creates the relaxed, partially double-stranded circular DNA genome.

=== Assembly and release ===
The relaxed, partially double-stranded circular DNA genome is able to diffuse into an empty capsid through large pores in the capsid. The capsid is then enveloped and exported from the cell through a process that is not yet well understood.

== Health effects ==
Chronic infections of WMHBV can go long periods of time before symptoms arise, especially when the woolly monkey is infected at birth. Chronic infections usually progress to liver issues which are often deadly. Woolly monkey autopsy reports from 1974 to 1998 noted hepatitis (liver inflammation), and liver necrosis (sudden liver failure) as two pathologies likely to be linked to WMHBV.

Chronic infections not only lead to health issues, but also allow for viral transmission. Chronically infected woolly monkeys have the virus actively replicating in their body, causing the virus to be transmissible in the monkey's bodily fluids.

== Transmission ==
Woolly monkey hepatitis B virus, like other hepatitis B viruses, is transmitted through bodily fluids, and from a mother to her fetus. The vertical transmission of WMHBV from mother to fetus is often the most detrimental, because similar to human HBV, age of infection is highly correlated to the risk of developing a chronic infection. Woolly monkeys infected with WMHBV at birth have around a 90% chance of developing a chronic infection, while those infected in adulthood have only a 5-10% chance of developing a chronic infection.

== Research advances ==
=== Developing a HBV animal model ===
Since woolly monkeys are endangered, they cannot be used as an HBV animal model for research. Therefore, they are seeking out other primates that may be able to be infected by WMHBV. The woolly monkey's close relative, the black-handed spider monkey (Ateles geoffroyi) is susceptible to infection by WMHBV, but does not display levels of viral replication as high as woolly monkeys. Researchers were able to create an infectious clone of WMHBV, coined WMHBV-2, that infects and replicates in black-handed spider monkeys to the same degree that WMHBV replicates in woolly monkeys.
