= WHV =

WHV may refer to:

- Warner Home Video, the home video distribution division of Warner Bros. Home Entertainment Group, itself part of Warner Bros. Discovery
- Wilhelmshaven, code used on German vehicle registration plates

== See also ==
- Woodchuck hepatitis virus
