= National Forest =

National Forest may refer to:

- National forest or state forest, a forest administered or protected by a sovereign state
  - National forest (Brazil)
  - National forest (France)
  - National forest (United States)
  - State Forests (Poland)
  - The National Forest (England)

== See also ==
- List of types of formally designated forests
- List of Brazilian National Forests
- List of national forests of the United States
