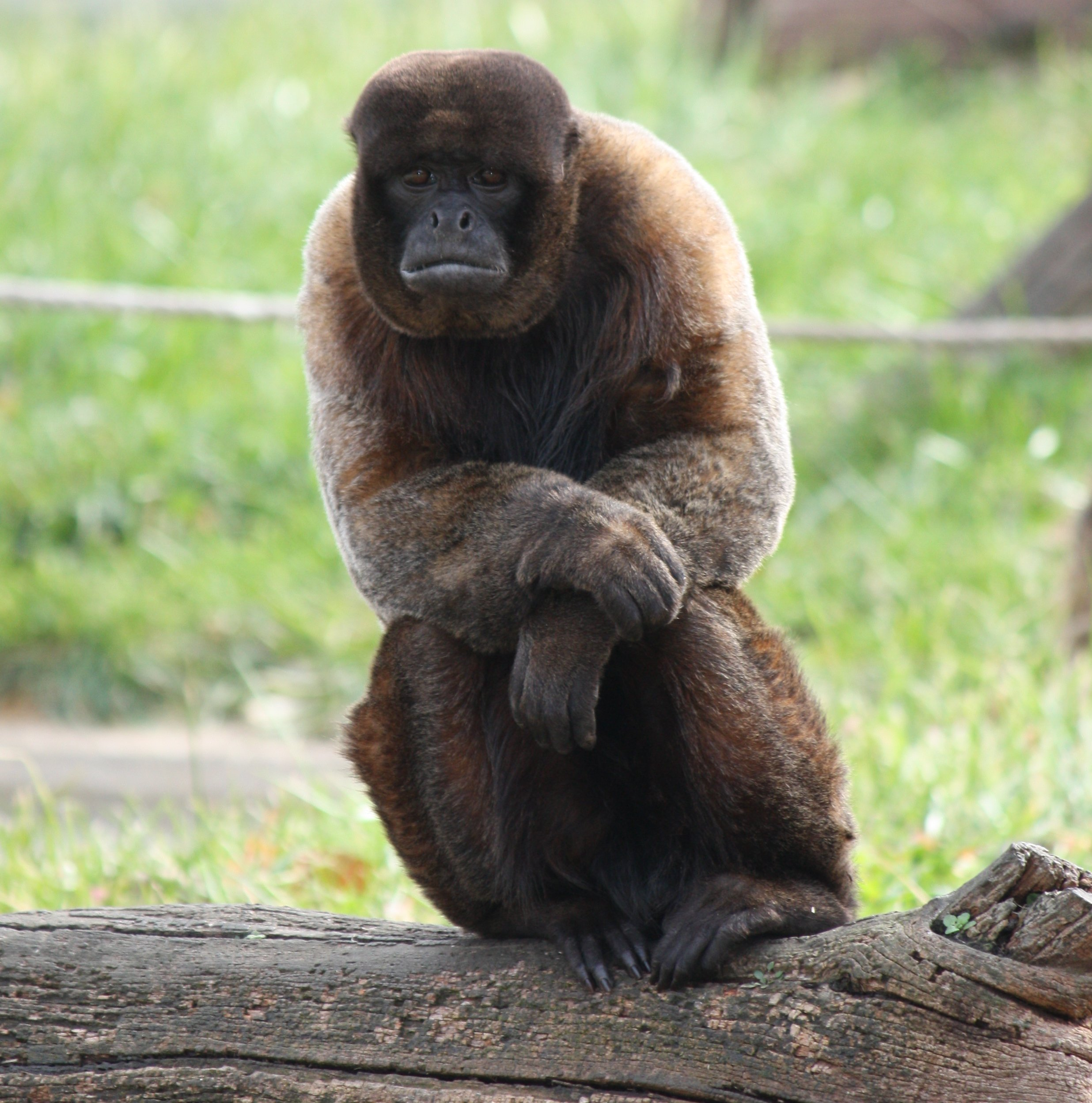

Conservation status
- Endangered (IUCN 3.1)

Scientific classification
- Kingdom: Animalia
- Phylum: Chordata
- Class: Mammalia
- Order: Primates
- Family: Atelidae
- Genus: Lagothrix
- Species: L. lagothricha
- Subspecies: L. l. poeppigii

Trinomial name
- Lagothrix lagothricha poeppigii Schinz, 1844
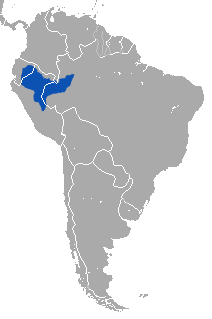
- Silvery woolly monkey range

Synonyms
- Lagothrix poeppigii

= Silvery woolly monkey =

Subspecies of New World monkey

The silvery woolly monkey (Lagothrix lagothricha poeppigii), also known as Poeppig's woolly monkey or the red woolly monkey, is a subspecies of the common woolly monkey from South America. Named after the German zoologist Eduard Friedrich Poeppig, it is found in Brazil, Ecuador and Peru.

== Taxonomy ==
It was initially thought to be a subspecies of the common woolly monkey (L. lagothricha), but was later reclassified as its own species. However, a 2014 phylogenetic study found it to in fact be a subspecies of L. lagothricha; the results of this study have been followed by the American Society of Mammalogists and the IUCN Red List.

== Habitat ==
Silvery woolly monkeys are habituated across the Amazonia, and are found in mature closed-canopy rainforest.

== Dispersal ==
Traditionally, silvery woolly monkeys have a male philopatry and female-biased dispersal. However, recent analysis of genetic data in L. poeppigii suggests that female-biased dispersal may not be strictly followed; both sexes are found to be dispersing. Genetic data and behavioural observations indicate that both sexes may disperse both before and after sexual maturity. However, females typically leave their natal groups to mate. Male-biased dispersal happens to avoid inbreeding and to gain better reproductive opportunities.

== Social structure ==
Silvery woolly monkeys live in multi-sex groups of 20-25 individuals.

== Behavior ==
Silvery woolly monkeys spend less time resting in comparison to other ateline primates. In addition, woolly monkeys spend a relatively small portion of their activity budget socializing. Socializing accounts for 8% to 9% of their activity budget. Woolly monkeys have an extremely low male on male aggression rate. During aggressive intergroup encounters males are more likely to be tolerant of each other. Immature males are likely to associate with adult males, spending significantly more time with other males than immature females. Immature females have little association with other females besides their mother-offspring relationship until dispersal.

=== Social play ===
Silvery woolly monkeys participate in play behaviour by chasing and grappling in groups of 2-5 individuals. Play is most commonly observed in immatures with no significant difference between sexes.

=== Grooming ===
Grooming between silvery woolly monkeys is quite rare. There is significantly different between sexes in received grooming. When grooming does occur it happens in relatively short bouts.

== Reproduction ==
Sexual behaviour is rarely observed within females before their dispersal, although females tend to reach sexual maturity earlier than males. After dispersal females do not begin reproduction until a year after joining their new social group. This delay may be due to not having reach full sexual maturity or social barriers within the group.

Females had a low tolerance to other females engaging in mating behaviour while males were tolerant of mating by other males. Females solicit a male by displaying an open-mouthed grin while shaking their head in the direction of the male. This expression occasionally occurs by both sexes during a mount.

Silvery woolly monkey reproductive events are the season with births mainly occurring between May and September. During this there is lower fruit availability, while periods of conception happen during points of higher fruit availability.

== Development ==
Silvery woolly monkeys are considered infants until around 6 months. Silvery woolly monkeys are locomotory independent at 2 years, and typically become socially independent after 3 years.

== Diet ==
Silvery woolly monkeys spend a majority of their day on subsistence activity; consuming plants and foraging for animal prey. Silvery woolly monkey's diet consists of 64% to 89% fruit; either ripe or nearly ripe. Silvery woolly monkeys will spit out the seeds of fruits to solely eat the flesh. Around 17% of their time is spent foraging, foraging usually occurs in large groups.
