= Rorainópolis =

Municipality in Roraima, Brazil

- Municipality
- Municipality of Rorainópolis
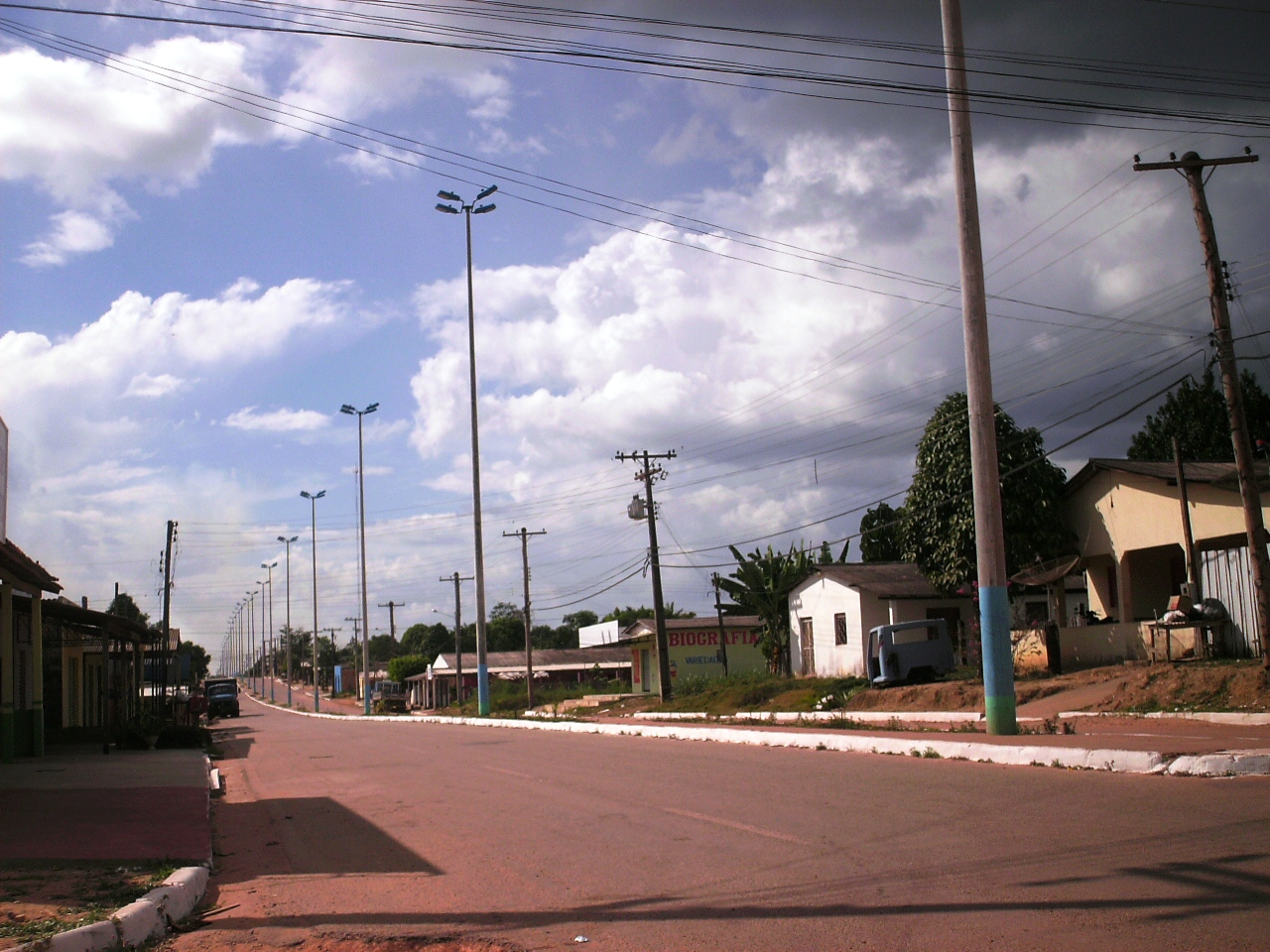
- A street in Rorainópolis

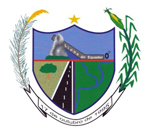
- Flag Coat of arms

- Location of Rorainópolis in the State of Roraima
- Coordinates: 00°56′45″N 60°25′04″W
- Country: Brazil
- Region: North
- State: Roraima
- Founded: 17 October 1995

Government
  - Mayor: Leandro Pereira da Silva (PSD)

Area
  - Total: 33,594 km^{2} (12,971 sq mi)
- Elevation: 98 m (322 ft)

Population (2022)
  - Total: 32,647
  - Density: 0.77/km^{2} (2.0/sq mi)
- Time zone: UTC−4 (AMT)
- HDI (2000): 0.676 – medium
- Website: www.rorainopolis.rr.gov.br

Rorainópolis (Brazilian Portuguese pronunciation: [ʁoɾajˈnɔpulis]) is a municipality located in the southernmost part of the state of Roraima in Brazil. Its population is 32,647 (as of 2022) and its area is 33,594 km^{2}. The municipality is crossed by the equator.

== History ==
In the 1970s, the regional headquarters of INCRA were established in Rorainópolis along the BR-174 highway. INCRA started to distribute land which attracted settlers from all of Brazil. In 1988, the name was changed from Vila do Incra to Rorainópolis. In 1995, Rorainópolis became an independent municipality, and has become the second most populous of the state of Roraima. The State University of Roraima operates a campus at Roraima.

== Nature ==
The Anauá National Forest is a 259,400 hectares (641,000 acres) national forest in Rorainópolis. It is a protected area with sustainable use of natural resources established in 2005. The Baixo Rio Branco-Jauaperi Extractive Reserve is a 581,173 hectares (1,436,110 acres) protected area which has a shared use agreement with Waimiri Atroari Indigenous Territory. It has been established in 2018.

The nature in Rorainópolis is under threat from palm oil plantations. Palmaplan has as of 2021, bought 30,000 hectares of land. The cattle ranchers are eager to sell their land, and deforest new areas.

== Villages ==
- Santa Maria do Boiaçu
