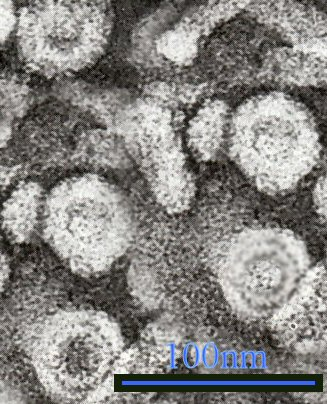
- TEM micrograph showing Hepatitis B virus virions

Virus classification
- (unranked): Virus
- Realm: Riboviria
- Kingdom: Pararnavirae
- Phylum: Artverviricota
- Class: Revtraviricetes
- Order: Blubervirales
- Family: Hepadnaviridae
- Genus: Orthohepadnavirus

Species
- See text

= Orthohepadnavirus =

Genus of viruses

Orthohepadnavirus is a genus of viruses, in the family Hepadnaviridae. Humans and other mammals serve as natural hosts. There are 19 species in this genus. Diseases associated with this genus include: hepatitis, hepatocellular carcinoma (chronic infections), and cirrhosis.

== Taxonomy ==
The genus contains the following species, listed by scientific name and followed by the exemplar virus of the species:

- Orthohepadnavirus bassarisci, Ringtail hepatitis B virus
- Orthohepadnavirus equidae, Equid hepatitis B virus
- Orthohepadnavirus felisdomestici, Domestic cat hepatitis B virus
- Orthohepadnavirus hominoidei, Hepatitis B virus genotype D – includes HBV and ape-infecting relatives (chHBV, giHBV, goHBV, orHBV). Named after the Hominoidea.
- Orthohepadnavirus lagothricis, Woolly monkey hepatitis B virus
- Orthohepadnavirus longidigiti, Long-fingered bat hepatitis B virus
- Orthohepadnavirus magniferrequini, Greater Horseshoe bat hepatitis B virus
- Orthohepadnavirus magnimyotis, Large myotis bat hepatitis B virus
- Orthohepadnavirus marmotae, Woodchuck hepatitis virus
- Orthohepadnavirus myominrhinus, Myodav bat hepatitis B virus
- Orthohepadnavirus philantombae, Tai Forest hepatitis B virus
- Orthohepadnavirus pomi, Pomona bat hepatitis B virus
- Orthohepadnavirus rotundifolii, Roundleaf bat hepatitis B virus – also includes HSBHBV
- Orthohepadnavirus sapaji, Capuchin monkey hepatitis B virus
- Orthohepadnavirus sciuri, Ground squirrel hepatitis virus (GSHV aka ASHV)
- Orthohepadnavirus soricicoronati, Crowned shrew hepatitis B virus
- Orthohepadnavirus soriciodoris, Musk shrew hepatitis B virus
- Orthohepadnavirus soricisinensis, Chinese shrew hepatitis B virus
- Orthohepadnavirus tabernarii, Tent-making bat hepatitis B virus

A few of the bat species were first reported in 2013.

== Structure ==
Viruses in the genus Orthohepadnavirus are enveloped, with spherical geometries, and T=4 symmetry. The diameter is around 42 nm. Genomes are circular, around 3.2kb in length. The genome codes for 7 proteins.

Genus	Structure	Symmetry	Capsid	Genomic arrangement	Genomic segmentation
Orthohepadnavirus	Icosahedral	T=4	Non-enveloped	Circular	Monopartite

== Life cycle ==
Viral replication is nucleo-cytoplasmic. Replication follows the dsDNA(RT) replication model. DNA-templated transcription, specifically dsDNA(RT) transcription, with some alternative splicing mechanism is the method of transcription. Translation takes place by leaky scanning. The virus exits the host cell by budding, and nuclear pore export. Human and mammals serve as the natural host. Transmission routes are sexual, blood, and contact.

Genus	Host details	Tissue tropism	Entry details	Release details	Replication site	Assembly site	Transmission
Orthohepadnavirus	Humans; mammals	Hepatocytes	Cell receptor endocytosis	Budding	Nucleus	Cytoplasm	Vertical: parental; sex; blood
