= Santa Maria do Boiaçu =

- Location in Brazil Santa Maria do Boiaçu (Brazil)
- Coordinates: 0.5218°S 61.7830°W
- Country: Brazil
- Region: North
- State: Roraima
- Municipality: Rorainópolis

Population (2010)
  - Total: 224
- Time zone: UTC-4

Santa Maria do Boiaçu is a village in the Brazilian municipality of Rorainópolis, in the state of Roraima. It is located on the Branco River, and inside the Baixo Rio Branco-Jauaperi Extractive Reserve.

== Overview ==
Santa Maria do Boiaçu is an isolated village along the Branco River. Except for Santa Maria and a few riverside settlements, the region is uninhabited. In 2018, the Baixo Rio Branco-Jauaperi Extractive Reserve was created which aims to protect the area while allowing for sustainable economic activities for the communities along the river. Between 1960 and 1982, it was a district of Caracaraí, but has become part of the municipality of Rorainópolis.

Santa Maria do Boiaçu has an airfield, an elementary school, the only high school in the region, and is connected to the telephone network and internet. The village has a medical post was which renovated in 2017.

The 2019 cutbacks and restructuring of FUNAI, the organisation in charge of the indigenous territories, by Jair Bolsonaro has resulted in Yanomami Amerindians leaving their territory and building camps in the vicinity of the village.

The BR-431 highway was supposed to connect Santa Maria do Boiaçu with the road network of Roraima, however as of 2020 only 45.6 kilometres of the planned 125 kilometres have been constructed.

== Bibliography ==
- de Rezende Veras, Antonio Tolrino; Costa Ribeiro, Wagner; Rodrigues Santos, Eder (2020). "Uma incursão ao Baixo Rio Branco (Roraima/Amazonas), saneamento básico". Confins (in French). 47 (47). doi:10.4000/confins.31823.
