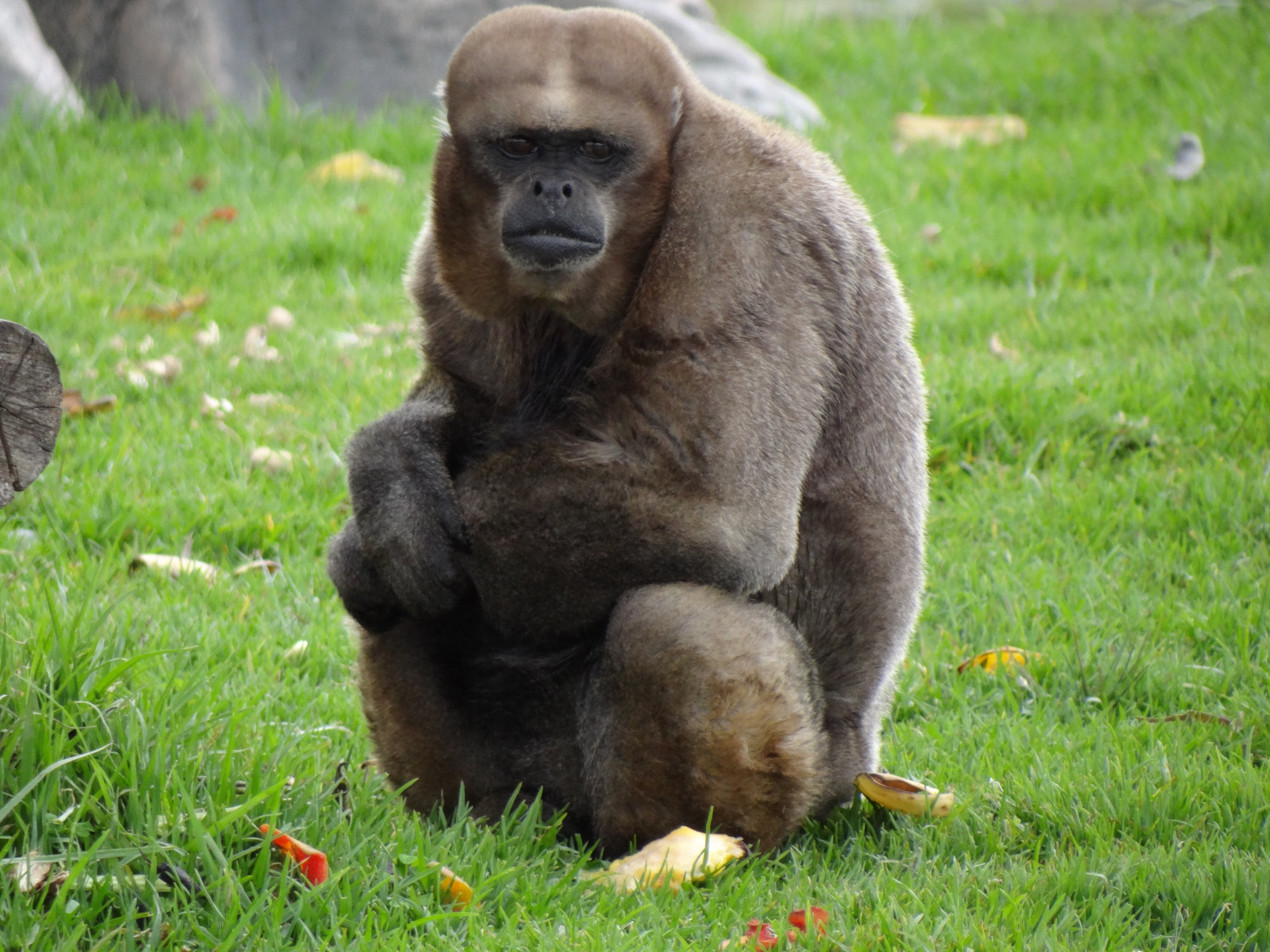

Conservation status
- Critically Endangered (IUCN 3.1)

Scientific classification
- Kingdom: Animalia
- Phylum: Chordata
- Class: Mammalia
- Order: Primates
- Family: Atelidae
- Genus: Lagothrix
- Species: L. lagothricha
- Subspecies: L. l. lugens

Trinomial name
- Lagothrix lagothricha lugens Elliot, 1907
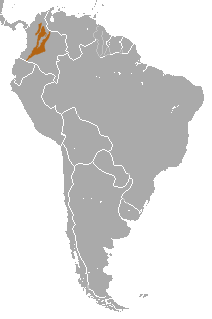
- Colombian woolly monkey range

Synonyms
- Lagothrix lugens

= Colombian woolly monkey =

Subspecies of New World monkey

The Colombian woolly monkey (Lagothrix lagothricha lugens) is a critically endangered subspecies of the common woolly monkey from Colombia.

It was initially thought to be a subspecies of the common woolly monkey (L. lagothricha), but was later reclassified as its own species. However, a 2014 phylogenetic study found it to in fact be a subspecies of L. lagothricha; the results of this study have been followed by the American Society of Mammalogists and the IUCN Red List.

Among all ateline primates, Colombian woolly monkeys exhibit the most sexual dimorphism in body size. Males are about forty-five percent heavier than their female counterparts. However, the cause of this dimorphism remains an enigma as there are no apparent female choice in favor of larger males. In fact, mating amongst Colombian woolly monkeys is promiscuous in that all adult and subadult males in a group mate with each female in estrous, and male-male rivalries in the context of mating are very rare.
