= Anauá National Forest =

National forest in Roraima, Brazil

- Floresta Nacional de Anauá
- IUCN category VI (protected area with sustainable use of natural resources)
- Location within Brazil Location within Roraima
- Nearest city: Rorainópolis, Roraima
- Coordinates: 0.6390°N 60.8392°W
- Area: 2,594 kilometres (1,612 mi)
- Designation: National forest
- Created: 18 February 2005
- Administrator: ICMBio

The Anauá National Forest (Portuguese: Floresta Nacional de Anauá) is a national forest in the state of Roraima, Brazil.

== Overview ==
The creation of the national forest was an initiative of the citizens of Rorainópolis in cooperation with the local logging association to create a protected area with sustainable land use. In 2005, the national forest was created and is managed by the Chico Mendes Institute for Biodiversity Conservation. The forest is located in the municipality of Rorainópolis.

The name refers to the Anauá River which is a tributary of the Branco River. In the Tupi language Anauá translates to flowering tree.

The Anauá National Forest is a densely forested rainforest influenced by several tributaries of the Branco River. A threat to the forest are the activities of illegal loggers.
