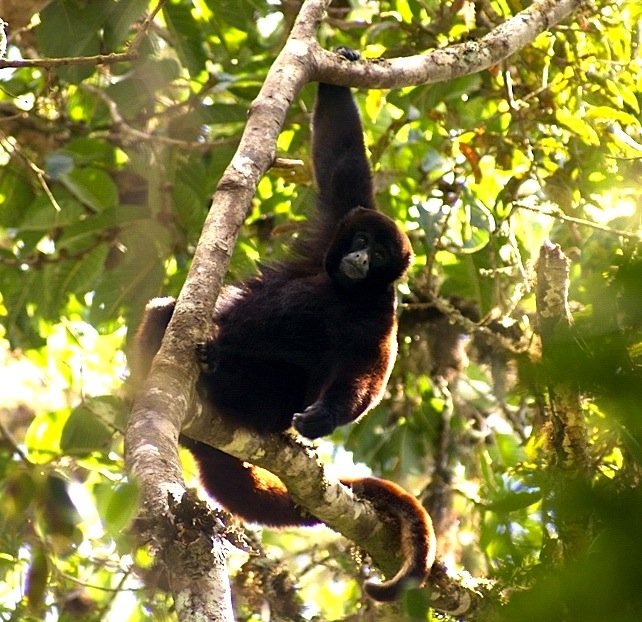

Conservation status
- Critically Endangered (IUCN 3.1)
- CITES Appendix I

Scientific classification
- Kingdom: Animalia
- Phylum: Chordata
- Class: Mammalia
- Order: Primates
- Family: Atelidae
- Genus: Lagothrix
- Species: L. flavicauda

Binomial name
- Lagothrix flavicauda (Humboldt, 1812)
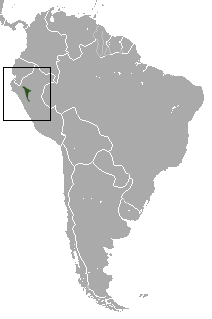
- Oreonax Flavicauda Range Map

Synonyms
- Oreonax flavicauda Thomas, 1927; Lagothrix hendeei

= Yellow-tailed woolly monkey =

Species of New World monkey

The yellow-tailed woolly monkey (Lagothrix flavicauda) is a species of New World monkey endemic to Peru. This rare primate is found only in the Peruvian Andes, primarily within the departments of Amazonas and San Martín, as well as in adjacent areas of La Libertad, Huánuco, and Loreto.

== Taxonomy ==
The yellow-tailed woolly monkey was originally classified in the genus Lagothrix along with other woolly monkeys. However, due to questionable primary sources, it was later placed in its own monotypic genus, Oreonax. Some researchers have proposed treating Oreonax as a subgenus of Lagothrix, while others have considered it a distinct genus.

A recent comprehensive study suggests that the yellow-tailed woolly monkey does indeed belong within the genus Lagothrix—a position now supported by the American Society of Mammalogists and the IUCN Red List.

== Discovery and rediscovery ==
The species was first described by Alexander von Humboldt in 1812 under the name Simia flavicauda, based on a skin obtained ten years earlier, which had been used by a local man as a horse saddle. Humboldt had never observed a live specimen or a preserved example and believed the animal belonged to the genus Alouatta. For over a century, the species was reported only on a few isolated occasions and was widely believed to be extinct.

In 1926, three specimens were collected in the Department of San Martín and brought to the Museum of Natural History. Initially believed to represent a new species, further examination confirmed that the specimens belonged to the yellow-tailed woolly monkey.

In 1974, a group of scientists led by Russell Mittermeier and funded by the World Wide Fund for Nature discovered a young yellow-tailed woolly monkey being kept as a pet in the city of Pedro Ruiz Gallo, Amazonas. The rediscovery drew national and international attention, prompting interest from conservation organizations seeking to assess the species' conservation status.

In the summer of 2004, scientists surveyed a remote area of San Martín, characterized by humid, mountainous tropical forest, in search of the yellow-tailed woolly monkey. The region, threatened by uncontrolled logging, was believed to host at least a small population. This area, along with two other locations in Peru, was included in the study.

Habitat loss due to deforestation poses a significant threat to the species. The introduction of agricultural plots in areas inhabited by the yellow-tailed woolly monkey has impacted its population. Local farmers have expressed concern about losing farmland to conservation efforts, although they stated that they do not hunt the monkeys. The land is primarily used for growing coffee and raising cattle. The challenge of balancing species conservation with the livelihoods of rural communities remains a central issue in the ongoing efforts to protect the yellow-tailed woolly monkey.

== Description ==
Oreonax flavicauda is one of the rarest Neotropical primates and among Peru's largest endemic mammals. Adult head-and-body lengths range from 51.3 to 53.5 cm (20.2 to 21.1 in), with tails extending up to 63 cm (25 in), often longer than the body. The average adult weight is approximately 8 kg (18 lb), though some males can reach up to 11.5 kg (25 lb). The yellow-tailed woolly monkey is comparable in size to the common woolly monkey, which also belongs to the genus Lagothrix.

These monkeys live in large social groups of around 23 individuals, composed of both males and females. They have low reproductive rates and long interbirth intervals, contributing to their vulnerability to extinction. Upon initial encounters, they may display aggressive behaviors such as branch shaking, "mooning" (exposing the scrotal tuft), and short barking vocalizations.

The species is characterized by longer and denser fur than other woolly monkeys—an adaptation to the cold montane forest environments it inhabits. Its coat is a deep mahogany or copper color, with a whitish patch on the snout that extends from the chin to between the eyes. The fur darkens toward the upper body, giving the head an almost black appearance.

Its powerful, prehensile tail features a hairless patch on the underside and a yellowish pelage on the final third, which gives the species its common name. This yellow coloration is not present in infants and juveniles. The tail is strong enough to support the monkey's entire body weight during feeding or while navigating the forest canopy. Additionally, the species is notable for a prominent tuft of long, yellowish pubic hair.

Yellow-tailed woolly monkeys are agile and capable of leaping distances of up to 15 m (49 ft).

== Habitat and distribution ==
The yellow-tailed woolly monkey is one of the least known of the primate species. It is also one of the largest neotropical primates. They are regularly found in the tropical Andes. Their habitat is characterized as rough terrain consisting of steep mountain sides and deep river gorges, with canopy heights of 20–25 m (66–82 ft). Cloud forest, the habitat of this monkey, are in high altitudes and often have cloud coverage near or in them. The last estimated population count was less than 250 individuals. The current habitat of the yellow-tailed monkey is fragmented due to deforestation, as is the population. This can hinder reproduction, as it limits an already limited population. The Yellow-Tailed monkey has never been subject to a full census so exact numbers vary. A study was done to examine the population however the terrain and fragmented populations made this difficult.

The yellow-tailed woolly monkey lives in the montane cloud forests of the Peruvian Andes at elevations of 1,500–2,700 m (4,900–8,900 ft) above sea level in the departments of Amazonas and San Martin, as well as bordering areas of La Libertad, Huánuco, and Loreto. Its habitat is characterized by steep gorges and ravines. The original extent of its habitat is estimated to be around 11,000 km^{2} (4,200 sq mi), but recent estimates put the remaining habitat at between 6,000 and 7,000 km^{2} (2,300 and 2,700 sq mi).

== Diet and natural history ==
Its diet is primarily frugivorous, but leaves, flowers, insects and other invertebrates are also eaten. The species is arboreal and diurnal. It has a multiple-male group social system and a polygamous mating system. They have a variety of vocalisations, including a loud, "puppy-like" bark which they use as a territorial or alarm call.

Yellow-tailed woolly monkeys participate in geophagy, the consumption of soil. Geophagy is a rare biological behavior, but the species benefits since it results in trace mineral intake of minerals and reduction of intestinal parasites; they tend to suffer from an iron-deficient diet. Their consumption of soil allows them to intake iron that they do not get from their regular diet.

== Conservation ==
The inaccessibility of its habitat protected the species until the 1950s. However, the construction of new roads, habitat loss and fragmentation from agriculture, logging and cattle ranching, and subsistence hunting, together with the monkey's naturally low population densities, slow maturation, and low reproductive rate, have led to a predicted decline of at least 80% over the next three generations. This and its restricted geographic distribution have led to this species' current critically endangered status.

Conservation work started soon after the species was rediscovered in the mid-1970s. This pioneering work by the Peruvian NGO APECO led to the creation of three protected areas, Rio Abiseo National Park, Alto Mayo Protected Forest, and Cordillera de Colán National Sanctuary. From the mid-1980s until recently, further conservation or research efforts were minimal. Starting in 2007, though, British NGO Neotropical Primate Conservation has been running conservation initiatives for the species throughout its range.

The species is considered one of "The World's 25 Most Endangered Primates".

Habitat loss by deforestation is the biggest threat to the endangerment of yellow-tailed woolly monkeys. The Lima-Tarapoto highway which runs through the regions of San Martin and Amazonas has caused the immigration of people from coastal and high mountain regions leading to overpopulation. Due to the negligence of the regional government of Shipasbamba, Amazonas to the accept requests for conservation efforts, local lands have been the victims of slash-and-burn agriculture by local farmers to support the growing demand of local agricultural crops, as well as to support the increase in population size. With the deforestation and increased population, the monkeys have had their habitat range reduced, which increases their risk of extinction. Conservation efforts led by ASPROCOT have been made recently to help protect the endangered monkeys by turning to alternative forms of agriculture to preserve the remnants of the Amazonas forests. However, a lack of funding has slowed the conservation process.

Several communities in Peru have made conservation efforts to preserve the yellow-tailed woolly monkeys through various ways. Community-based conservation efforts have been made in preserving the monkeys, such as in Los Chilchos valley, where the project is directed by the Apenheul Primate Conservation Trust. Efforts include preventing further immigration into areas home to the monkeys and beginning ecosystem protection initiatives. Neotropical Primate Conservation has begun using newly constructed roads in La Esperanza to access areas which are now being used to develop ecotourism initiatives to build awareness about the endangered monkey population and its habitat, which has helped local people understand the importance in preserving the monkeys and that the monkeys can be used as a valuable tourist attraction.
