= Caxiuanã National Forest =

National forest in Pará, Brazil

Caxiuanã National Forest Floresta Nacional de Caxiuanã
- IUCN category VI (protected area with sustainable use of natural resources)
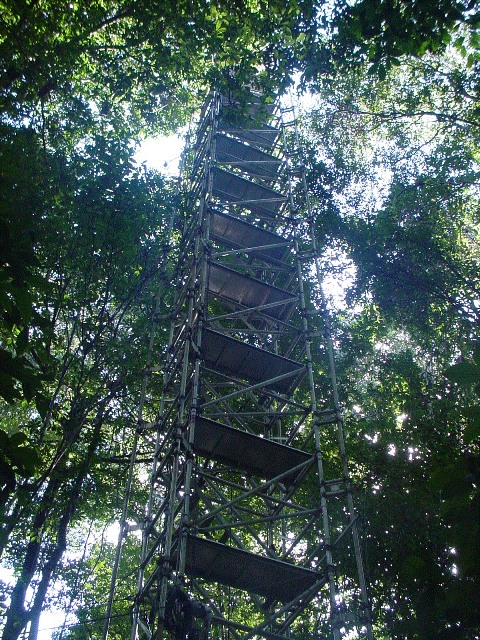
- Meteorological station, Caxiuanã National Forest

- Location within Brazil
- Coordinates: 1.792306°S 51.434028°W
- Area: 300,000 hectares (740,000 acres)
- Designation: National forest
- Established: 1961
- Governing body: Chico Mendes Institute for Biodiversity Conservation

Caxiuanã National Forest (Portuguese: Floresta Nacional de Caxiuanã, also FLONA de Caxiuanã) is a national forest located in lower Amazon region the state of Pará in the North Region of Brazil. It is located on the west banks of the Baía de Caxiuanã between the Xingu River and downstream from the Anapu River. The forest is located southeast of the Ilha do Marajó. Caxiuanã National Forest covers two municipalities in Pará, Portel (population: 47,967) and Melgaço (population: 25,153), but the forest itself is sparsely inhabited. It is located 400 kilometres (250 mi) from the state capitol of Belém.

Caxiuanã is noted for its rich biodiversity, geographic isolation, and a very low population density. The national forest is the oldest in Amazônia Legal, a region that contains all 9 states in the Amazon basin, and is also the second oldest national forest in Brazil.

Hearings on logging in Caxiuanã National Forest, part of a nationwide campaign to grant logging concessions in national parks by the Brazilian Forest Service (Serviço Florestal Brasileiro, SFB), began in 2014. A proposal calls for the logging of 1,800 square kilometres (690 mi^{2}) in three areas of Caxiuanã.

== Administration and research stations ==
Caxiuanã National Forest was established on November 28, 1961, under federal law No. 239. It is managed by Chico Mendes Institute for Biodiversity Conservation (ICMBio), which maintains two bases in the forest. The Ferreira Penna Scientific Station (Estação Científica Ferreira Penna) is maintained by the Museu Paraense Emílio Goeldi and Brazilian Institute of Environment and Renewable Natural Resources (Instituto Brasileiro do Meio Ambiente e dos Recursos Naturais Renováveis, IBAMA), and is the center of many international research projects. The research station covers 330 square kilometres (130 mi^{2}), opened in 1993, and consists of laboratories and housing.

== Climate ==
Caxiuanã is located in the humid tropical climate zone with an annual medium temperature of 26 °C (79 °F), and mean annual rainfall is 2,272 mm (89.4 in). The forest has two seasons. The dry season runs from June to December, with rainfall declining to 50.7 mm (2.0 in) in October. The wet season runs from January to May and rainfall reaches 379.8 mm (15.0 in) in March.

== Vegetation ==
Caxiuanã is in the Xingu–Tocantins–Araguaia moist forests ecoregion.The forest is noted for its diversity of vegetation. It is home to terra firme, a type of forest unique to the Amazon Basin where dead organic matter decays and is rapidly recycled into soil. Terra firme forests do not flood seasonally, and are easily and permanently destroyed by deforestation. Terra firme forests make up 85% of Caxiuanã, and have a canopy that reaches 35 metres (115 ft) on average. The soil of the terra firme is characterized by oxisol, a soil type typical of tropical rainforest.

Floodplain forests unique to the Amazon River Basin are also present in Caxiuanã. The várzea, a seasonal floodplain forest engulfed by white water rivers of the Amazon. The várzea forest areas are located around Caxiuanã Bay. Igapó is a seasonal floodplain forest engulfed by blackwater of the Amazon. Várzea and igapó flood plain forests make up 12% of Caxiuanã. Caxiuanã also contains areas of vegetation similar to that found in the savanna, and areas that were formerly orchards and contain residual agricultural vegetation.

== Population ==
Caxiuanã was once home to Arucará and Aricuru populations, both part of the Guaycuru people. 27 archaeological sites reveal that the forest was populated in ancient times.

The forest now has a small population of 29 families with 206 members (2003). The population of the forest are concentrated into three small villages. Residents engage in primitive agriculture, primarily for the production of manioc flour. Fishing and hunting are also important sources of food. Brazil nuts and açaí are also exported from the forest. The current population of the forest may not cause damage to the forest as they carry on practices of the prehistoric population of the forest. Research on the local population and its effect on the ecology of Caxiuanã, however, is lacking.

== Access ==
Caxiuanã National Forest is accessible only by boat. The shortest route to the forest is made in two stages: first by air to the city of Breves, Pará, also in the state of Pará, and then an 8-hour boat ride to the Caxiuanã. The trip can be made entirely by boat from Belém, a trip of 25 hours.
