= São Francisco National Forest =

National Forest in Brazil

- Floresta Nacional de São Francisco
- IUCN category VI (protected area with sustainable use of natural resources)
- Location within Brazil
- Coordinates: 9°51′40″S 69°20′28″W
- Area: 21,147.67 hectares (52,257.0 acres)
- Designation: National forest
- Created: 7 August 2001
- Administrator: Chico Mendes Institute for Biodiversity Conservation

The São Francisco National Forest (Portuguese: Floresta Nacional de São Francisco) is a national forest in the state of Acre, Brazil.

== Location ==
Conservation units in the east of Acre.: 10. São Francisco National Forest

The São Francisco National Forest is in the municipality of Sena Madureira in the state of Acre. It has an area of 21,147.67 hectares (52,257.0 acres). It is in the Amazon biome. It adjoins the Macauã National Forest, which lies to the north. The Macauã River runs through the northern part of the forest. The Chico Mendes Extractive Reserve is some distance to the south, on the opposite side of the Iaco River.

== History ==
The São Francisco National Forest was created by federal decree on 7 August 2001. It is administered by the Chico Mendes Institute for Biodiversity Conservation (ICMBio). It is classed as IUCN protected area category VI (protected area with sustainable use of natural resources). The objective is to support sustainable multiple use of forest resources and scientific research, with emphasis on methods for sustainable exploitation of native forests.

The consultative council of the Macauã and São Francisco national forests was created on 17 January 2002. On 17 August 2008 the Instituto Nacional de Colonização e Reforma Agrária (National Institute for Colonization and Agrarian Reform, INCRA) recognised the forest as an agro-extractive project for 25 families. On 1 December 2010 INCRA assigned the forest to ICMBio. The management plan was approved on 25 May 2016.

== Sources ==
- Flona de São Francisco (in Portuguese), Chico Mendes Institute for Biodiversity Conservation
- FLONA de São Francisco (in Portuguese), ISA:Instituto Socioambiental
- Unidade de Conservação: Floresta Nacional de São Francisco (in Portuguese), Ministério do Meio Ambiente
