= Macauã National Forest =

National forest in the state of Acre, Brazil

- Floresta Nacional do Macauã
- IUCN category VI (protected area with sustainable use of natural resources)
- Location within Brazil
- Coordinates: 9°59′53″S 69°42′50″W
- Area: 176,349 hectares (435,770 acres)
- Designation: National forest
- Created: 12 June 1988
- Administrator: Chico Mendes Institute for Biodiversity Conservation

The Macauã National Forest (Portuguese: Floresta Nacional do Macauã) is a national forest in the state of Acre, Brazil.

== Location ==
Conservation units in Acre. 9: Macauã National Forest

The Macauã National Forest is in the municipality of Sena Madureira in the state of Acre. It has an area of 176,349 hectares (435,770 acres). It is in the Amazon biome. The forest is bounded to the west and north by the Cazumbá-Iracema Extractive Reserve, and to the southeast by the São Francisco National Forest. The Macauã River forms most of its southeast boundary. The forest would be included in the proposed Western Amazon Ecological Corridor.

== Creation and operation ==
The Macauã National Forest was created by presidential decree 96.189 of 21 June 1988. It is administered by the Chico Mendes Institute for Biodiversity Conservation (ICMBio). It is classed as IUCN protected area category VI (protected area with sustainable use of natural resources). The objective is to support sustainable use of forest resources and scientific research with emphasis on methods for sustainable exploitation of native forests.

A consultative council for the Macauã and São Francisco national forests was created on 18 January 2002. On 23 August 2006 the Instituto Nacional de Colonização e Reforma Agrária (National Institute for Colonization and Agrarian Reform) recognised the forest as an agro-extractive project for 35 families. The management plan for the Macauã and São Francisco national forests was approved on 20 May 2016. 32,000 hectares (79,000 acres) are used for the production of wood totalling an estimated 24,000 cubic metres (850,000 cu ft) annually.

== People ==
According to the 2007 census 25 families living in the forest, organised into the Associação de Extrativistas da Floresta Nacional do Macauã e Área de Entorno (ASSEXMA: Association of Extractors of the Macauã National Forest and Surrounding Area). As of 2010 there were 23 families living in the forest. All had been born there and most had never left the forest. They are descended from rubber tappers who came to the region in the late 19th century. After the production of rubber in Asia destroyed the demand for Brazilian rubber the tappers turned to raising crops such as corn and beans and extracting timber and nuts for money, as they still do today. More recently copaiba has become a valuable forest product. Although there are jaguars, they are not a danger to people since there is abundant game. Residents take turtles, peccaries, monkeys and birds from the forest for food. Professional hunters take margay, jaguar and anaconda for the leather trade.

== Sources ==
- Andrea C. Carrillo; Lêda Luz (February 2013), Reflexões sobre conselhos gestores de unidades de conservação federais apoiadas pelo WWF-Brasil (PDF)
- Ayres, José Márcio; Da Fonseca, Gustavo A. B.; Rylands, Anthony B.; Queiroz, Helder L.; Pinto, Luiz Paulo; Masterson, Donald; Cavalcanti, Roberto B. (2005), Os Corredores Ecológicos das Florestas Tropicais do Brasil (PDF) (in Portuguese), Sociedade Civil Mamirauá, archived from the original (PDF) on 2016-07-31
- Flona do Macauã (in Portuguese), Chico Mendes Institute for Biodiversity Conservation
- FLONA do Macauã (in Portuguese), ISA: Instituto Socioambiental
- Miriane Teles (5 April 2010), Oficina de Unidades de Conservação na Floresta Nacional do Macauã (in Portuguese), Notícias do Acre
- Unidade de Conservação: Floresta Nacional de Macauã (in Portuguese), MMA: Ministério do Meio Ambiente
