= Woodchuck hepatitis virus =

Virus classification
- (unranked): Virus
- Realm: Riboviria
- Kingdom: Pararnavirae
- Phylum: Artverviricota
- Class: Revtraviricetes
- Order: Blubervirales
- Family: Hepadnaviridae
- Genus: Orthohepadnavirus
- Species: Orthohepadnavirus marmotae

Species of virus

Woodchuck hepatitis virus (WHV) is a species of the genus Orthohepadnavirus. It was first discovered in 1977 in a captive population of Marmota monax, but has since been discovered in wild populations in the Eastern United States.

Woodchucks with an chronic infection of WHV inevitably develop hepatocellular carcinoma; this has led to the use of WHV in woodchucks as a model for human Hepatitis B virus infections.
