= Avian HBV RNA encapsidation signal epsilon =

RNA structure

AHBV_epsilon cis-regulatory RNA element
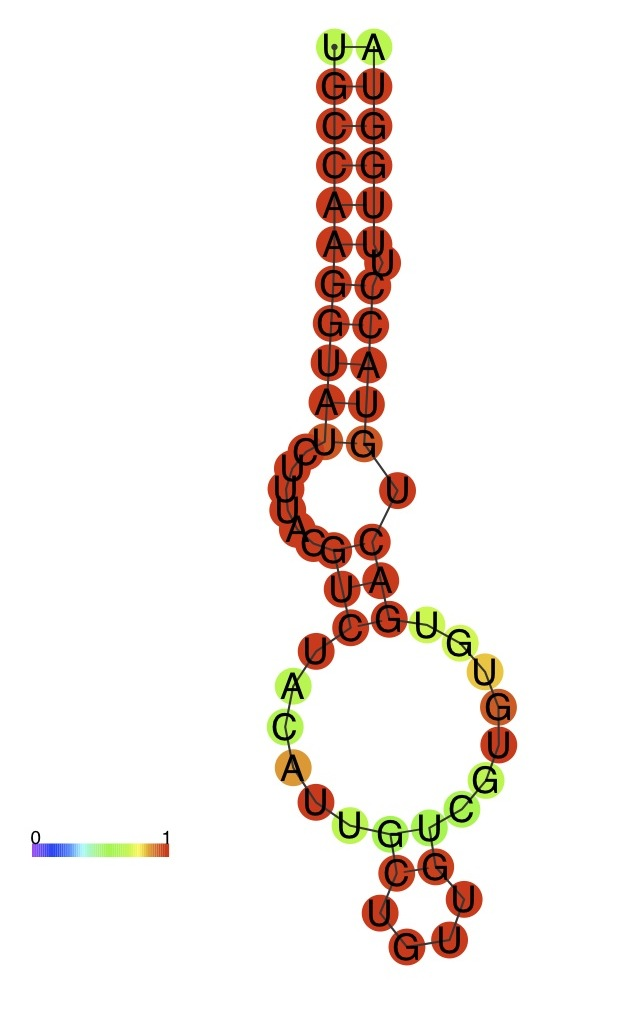
- Predicted secondary structure and sequence conservation of AHBV_epsilon

Identifiers
- Symbol: AHBV_epsilon
- Rfam: RF01313

Other data
- RNA type: Cis-reg
- Domain(s): Viruses
- GO: GO:0019079
- SO: SO:0005836
- PDB structures: PDBe

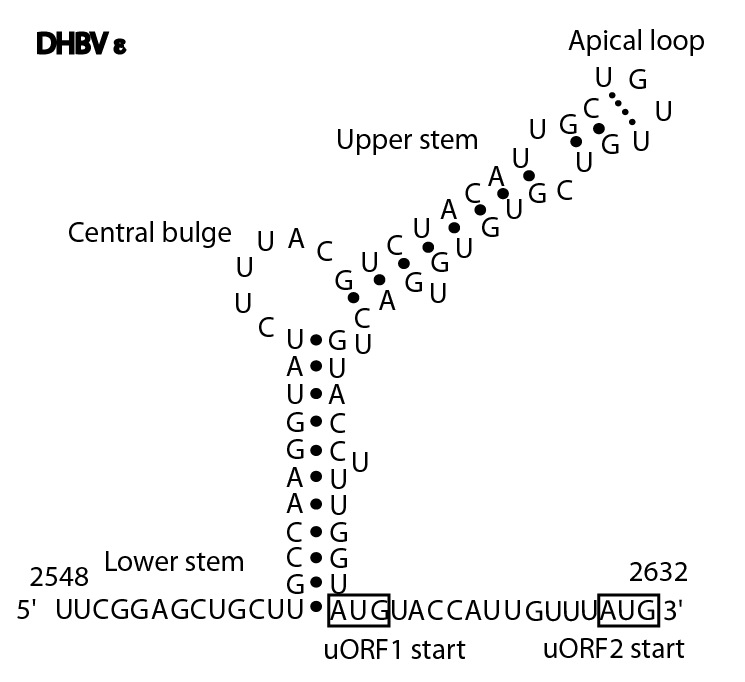
Fig. 1. Duck HBV RNA encapsidation signal epsilon

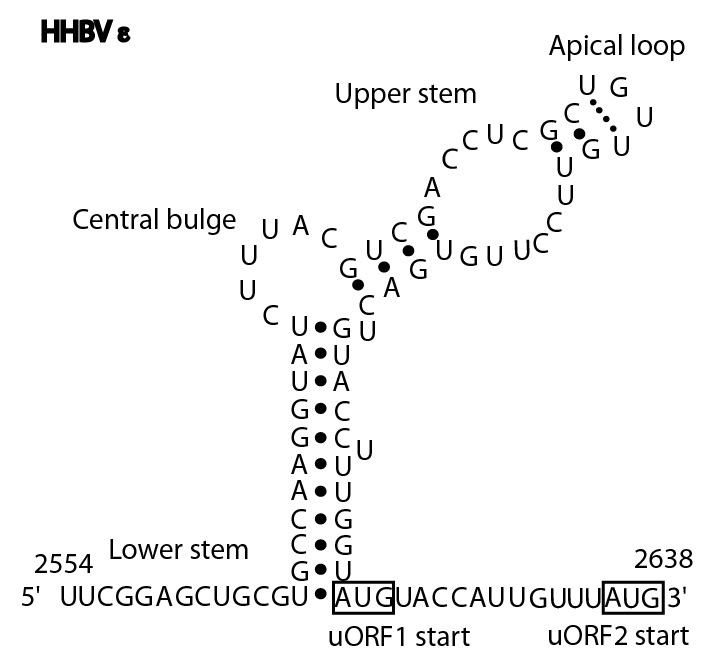
Fig. 2. Heron HBV RNA encapsidation signal epsilon

The Avian HBV RNA encapsidation signal epsilon (AHBV epsilon) is an RNA structure that is shown to facilitate encapsidation of the pregenomic RNA required for viral replication. There are two main classes of encapsidation signals in avian hepatitis B viruses - Duck hepatitis B virus (DHBV) and Heron hepatitis B virus (HHBV) like. DHBV is used as a model to understand human Hepatitis B virus. Although studies have shown that the HHBV epsilon has less pairing in the upper stem than DHBV, this pairing is not absolutely required for DHBV infection in ducks.

DHBV epsilon consists of a stem structure, a bulge and an apical loop (Fig. 1). The RNA structure was determined by chemical probing, NMR analysis and by mutagenesis.

HHBV epsilon also consists of a stem structure, a bulge and an apical loop (Fig. 2). The RNA structure has been determined by chemical probing and by mutagenesis. However, it has less base pairing in the upper stem than DHBV epsilon.

Recent NMR analysis of both the HHBV and DHBV epsilon have shown that the apical loop to be capped by a stable well-structured UGUU tetraloop.

== See also ==
- HBV RNA encapsidation signal epsilon
