= CccDNA =

Intermediate DNA structure in viral replication

cccDNA (covalently closed circular DNA) is a special DNA structure that arises during the propagation of some viruses in the cell nucleus and may remain permanently there. It is a double-stranded DNA that originates in a linear form that is ligated by means of DNA ligase to a covalently closed ring. In most cases, transcription of viral DNA can occur from the circular form only. The cccDNA of viruses is also known as episomal DNA or occasionally as a minichromosome.

cccDNA was first described in bacteriophages, but it was also found in some cell cultures where an infection of DNA viruses (Polyomaviridae) was detected. cccDNA is typical of Caulimoviridae and Hepadnaviridae, including the hepatitis B virus (HBV). cccDNA in HBV is formed by conversion of capsid-associated relaxed circular DNA (rcDNA). Following hepatitis B infections, cccDNA can remain following clinical treatment in liver cells and can rarely reactivate. The relative quantity of cccDNA present is an indicator for HBV treatment.

== Background of cccDNA and the Hepatitis B virus ==
Closed covalent circular DNA (cccDNA) is a unique DNA structure that forms in response to infection of a cell. Genomic DNA enters the cell nucleus, and partially double-stranded DNA is then converted into cccDNA.

CccDNA is primarily seen in the context of the Hepatitis B virus (HBV). Approximately 257 million people worldwide are chronically infected with the virus, placing them at high risk for developing cirrhosis and hepatocellular carcinoma (HCC). Chronic infection is characterized by the persistence of the cccDNA minichromosome in the nuclei of host hepatocytes (liver cells). Current treatments are unable to completely clear the viral minichromosome from the host hepatocytes, and as a result aim to "functionally cure" the host, which requires a blockade of the viral cccDNA through transcriptional silencing. The infected individual cannot be completely cured without a clearance of cccDNA from infected hepatocytes, which at present is not possible.

CDC Recommended Vaccine Schedule

The HBV pathogen is a small, blood-transmitted virus with high tissue and species specificity that is transmitted through exposure to infected blood or bodily fluids. The only cells that the virus can infect are hepatocytes, and these are reached by means of the bloodstream after infection. Hepatocytes are cells from liver tissue that are involved in protein synthesis and storage. While this disease can be prevented by vaccination, high-risk individuals such as infants can have as high as a 90% chance of chronic liver disease if not previously vaccinated. As a result, the CDC recommends the first dose of hepatitis B vaccine be administered immediately at birth. CccDNA and its persistence in the nucleus remains the main obstacle for an effective cure and is therefore the reason for the rigorous hepatitis B vaccination schedule.

In practice, the only known organism that makes use of cccDNA is the Hepatitis B Virus. More specifically, cccDNA is a reactive intermediate that significantly contributes to infections of hepatocytes. The persistence of cccDNA throughout the duration of the infection has been a key player in the prevalence of HBV. Research indicates that cccDNA is actually the primary reason that historically, there has been little progress toward eradicating HBV. In many cases, even after the infection has been resolved, cccDNA can still be detected. Currently, therapy for HBV involves nucleotide analogues (NAs), which initially were implemented in clinical use in the late 1990s. Though many different therapeutic techniques have been trialed over the years, a cure for HBV has yet to be discovered. Researchers attribute this to the continued inability to disable the cccDNA. Future therapies will need to focus directly on eliminating this factor.

== Properties of cccDNA ==
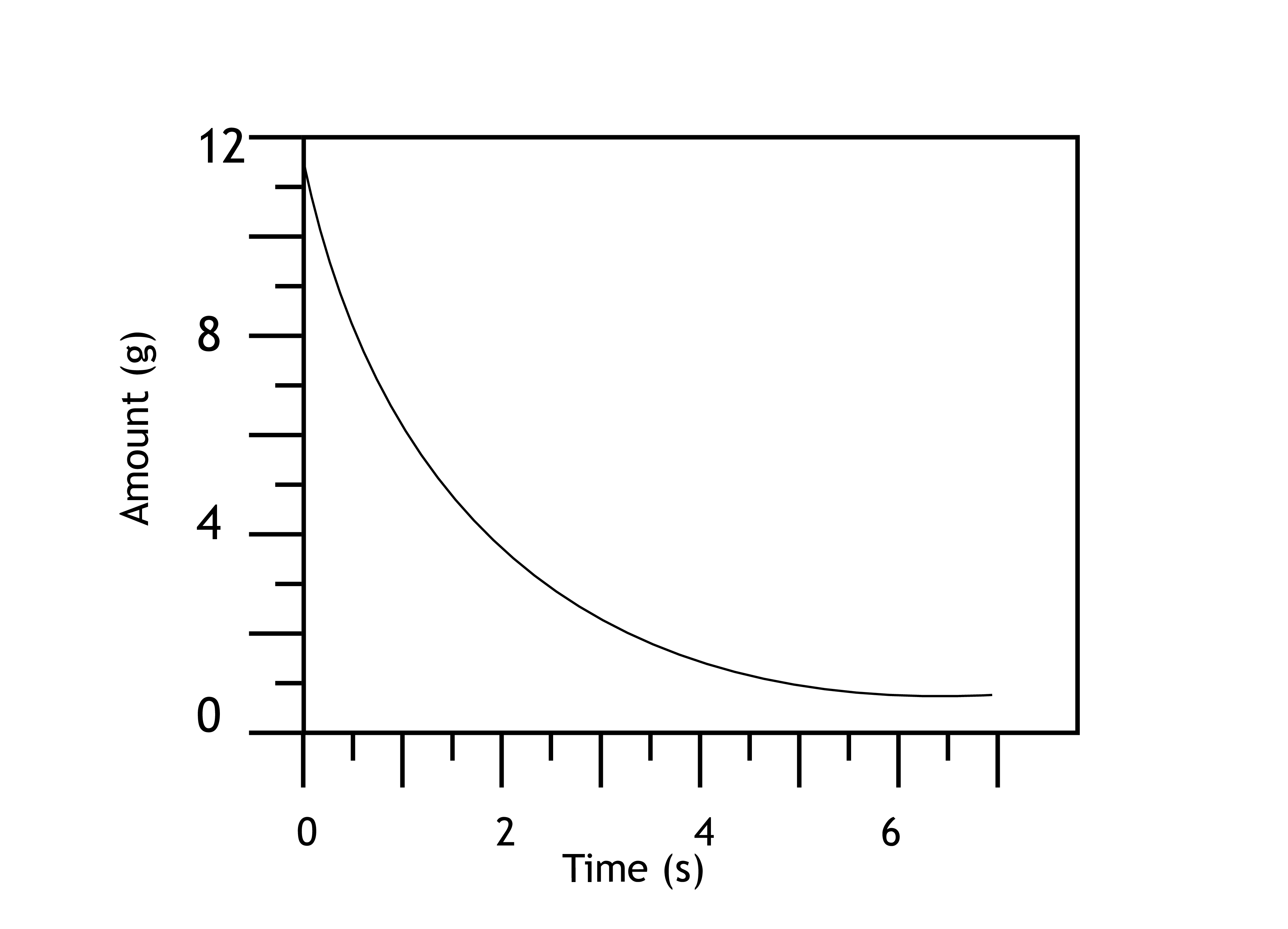
A generic half life graph which can be used to model cccDNA half life using the time of half life for cccDNA.

CccDNA is able to form a stable minichromosome in the nucleus of cells that are infected with a particular virus associated with cccDNA. As part of the nucleus, cccDNA is able to interact with histone and non-histone proteins to form structures similar to chromatin. In the same way as host chromatin, cccDNA transcription is regulated through the control of two enhancers and four distinct promoters. It also depends on multiple regulators including transcription factors, co-activators, co-repressors and chromatin modifying enzymes. In addition, cccDNA can serve as a template for viral replication and DNA transcription for five viral RNAs which allows for the production of the viral antigens.

It is challenging to quantify the number of copies of cccDNA in each cell as it depends on the type of cell and the type of infection. Although the half life of cccDNA has not been determined yet, it has been tested in vitro to last during the lifespan of the cell. In a recent in vitro study on HBV, the results showed that the half life of the human liver cell (HepG2) is 40 days and provides an estimated lifespan of 58 days. The half life in vivo of human liver cells has not yet been determined.

== Role of cccDNA in HBV replication ==
CccDNA is associated with the hepatitis B virus (HBV), where the virus constructs its plasmid through covalently linking its bonds. The histone-containing region of the nucleus within the virus is where cccDNA is commonly found, usually interacting with the histones similar to that of chromatin. The models available for determining bacterial specificity is currently limited to three cell culture types: primary tupaia, or human hepatocytes (PHH), and differentiated HepaRG (dHepaRG). It is from these models that HBV replication was observed via transcription of the cccDNA. It is these lack of models that prevent drug treatment, due to the lack of efficiency in eradicating the cccDNA.

HepaRG was the first cell line to successfully support HBV infection, and demonstrated that the infection can only be hosted by human hepatocytes. Once hepatocyte-like cells were exposed to differentiation inducers, the viral source was introduced from a known HBV carrier containing high levels of cccDNA, and the HBV surface antigen levels were analyzed, indicating that the infection had successfully been replicated in HepaRG cells. Typically HBV is measured by the cccDNA levels via Southern blot kinetics of healthy vs infected cells and quantified by dot blot. In these infected cells, there is a strong correlation between the cccDNA, that acts as a replication marker, and secretion levels of the surface antigen, HBsAg.

== Biological functions ==
CccDNA is formed from rcDNA (relaxed circular DNA) through the removal of a viral polymerase on the 5' end of the negative strand of DNA, the removal of the 5' end of the plus strand, and the removal of one copy of the short terminal redundancy from the minus strand. After these removals occur, the positive strand is completed and ligation of the two viral DNA strands occurs. The mechanism of infection stems from the conversion of relaxed circular double stranded DNA (rcDNA) into cccDNA, from virus templates, speculated to be performed by the cell's own DNA repair enzymes. This process occurs due to the retrotranscription of a cccDNA transcript into the normal cell's rcDNA genomes. Deprotonation of the rcDNA then acts as a precursor of cccDNA via a polymerase chain reaction. While there is debate concerning the next steps in the mechanisms for formation and metabolism of cccDNA, it is known that ligase inhibitors play a crucial role as knockout experiments support. DNA ligase 1 and DNA ligase 3 directly reduce the formation of cccDNA, whereas DNA ligase 4 is crucial for cccDNA formation in only the double stranded linear DNA.

This conversion of partially double stranded rcDNA into cccDNA generally occurs when a hepatocyte becomes infected. cccDNA can produce all of the equipment necessary to complete viral replication and protein production and therefore does not need to use its host's semi-conservative DNA replication machinery.

Triggers and controls of cccDNA production are not fully known, but it is thought that there may be a system involving negative feedback to suppress cccDNA production once about 10-50 copies are made. cccDNA pools, once made, are easily maintained so it is not necessary for a cell to be infected multiple times to create a cccDNA pool. cccDNA can be diluted and or lost through mitosis, but in general cccDNA can exist over the course of a hepatocyte's lifecycle without impacting its viability. This lifelong persistence of cccDNA is hypothesized to explain observed lifelong immune responses to HBV.

Immune mediated, epigenetic, and viral factors are all thought to have an impact on cccDNA activity. Investigation into the mechanisms through which these various factors influence cccDNA activity in vivo is rather limited due to the select animal hosts that are available. In regards to immune mediated factors, research has shown that inflammatory cytokines can suppress viral replication and diminish cccDNA pools in infected cells. Additionally, acetylation and deacetylation of cccDNA is thought to regulate transcription of cccDNA and thus its viral replication. Acetylation has been found to correlate with viral replication while deacetylation has been found to be correlated with low viral replication in vitro. Further investigation is needed to study the effects of acetylation and deacetylation on cccDNA activity in vivo.
