= Bersacapavir =

Chemical compound

Legal status
- Legal status: Investigational

Identifiers
- CAS Number: 1638266-40-6
- PubChem CID: 121294984
- DrugBank: DB19035
- ChemSpider: 88297229
- UNII: 2456KW2166
- KEGG: D12126
- ChEMBL: ChEMBL4744254

Chemical and physical data
- Formula: C_{16}H_{14}F_{4}N_{4}O_{3}S
- Molar mass: 418.37 g·mol^{−1}
- 3D model (JSmol): Interactive image
- SMILES: C[C@@H](C(F)(F)F)NS(=O)(=O)C1=CN(C(=C1)C(=O)NC2=CC(=C(C=C2)F)C#N)C
- InChI: InChI=1S/C16H14F4N4O3S/c1-9(16(18,19)20)23-28(26,27)12-6-14(24(2)8-12)15(25)22-11-3-4-13(17)10(5-11)7-21/h3-6,8-9,23H,1-2H3,(H,22,25)/t9-/m0/s1; Key:SBVBIDUKSBJYEF-VIFPVBQESA-N

Bersacapavir is an experimental drug for the treatment of hepatitis B. It prevents hepatitis B virus (HBV) from replicating by inhibiting the formation of its capsid. It is also being studied for use in combination with JNJ-73763989, a small interfering RNA that targets HBV RNAs.

It can be synthesized beginning with N-methylpyrrole.
