= Reverse-transcribing virus =

Reverse-transcribing virus refers to viruses or virus-like elements which utilize reverse transcriptase.

Under current classification, these include:

- Revtraviricetes

- Retroviruses
- Hepadnaviruses

- Transposable elements

- Retrotransposons
