= HepaRG =

Hepatic cell line model

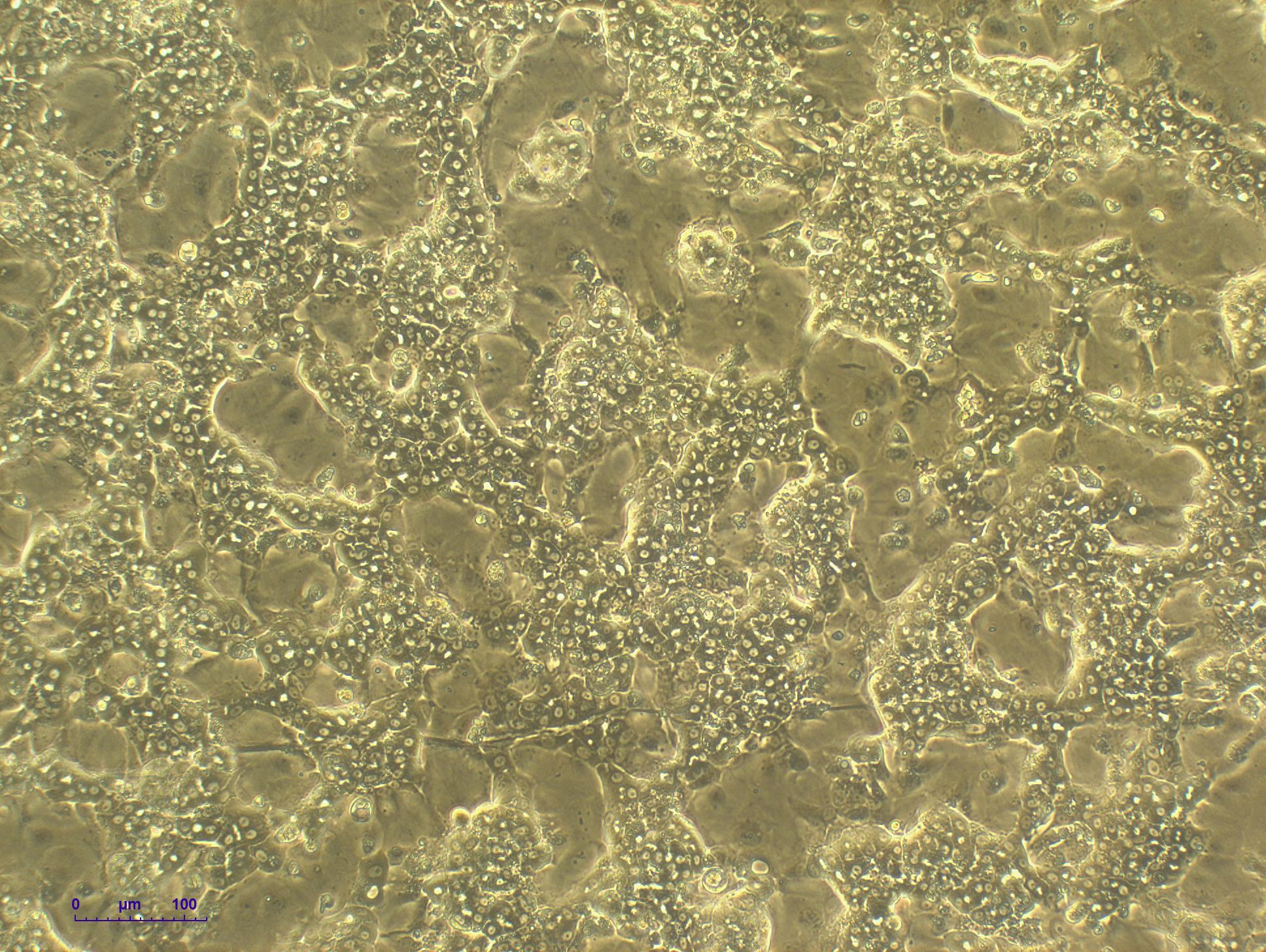
Fully differentiated HepaRG cells organized in well-delineated trabeculae with many bright canaliculi-like structures.

HepaRG cell line is an in vitro human hepatic cell line used in liver biology research and for assessing liver pathology, hepatotoxicity, and drug-induced liver injury. The HepaRG model is considered as a surrogate for primary human hepatocytes, which are considered up to now the most pertinent in vitro model to mimic human liver functioning.

In contrast to the historic hepatic cell line HepG2, HepaRG cells display a mature hepatocyte-like phenotype and retain various key hepatic functions, including the expression of CYP enzymes and transporters and the formation of bile canaliculi. They can be cultured in 2D and 3D configurations.

== History ==
In 1999, the HepaRG cell line was established from a tumor sample originating from a female patient suffering from hepatocellular carcinoma and HCV infection. These cells were named HepaRG to honor Sylvie Rumin and Philippe Gripon for their contribution to the discovery of this cell model, under the supervision of Dr. Christiane Guguen-Guillouzo and Dr. Christian Trépo from INSERM (French National Institute of Health and Medical Research). As part of her study on hepatitis infection, Rumin noticed the presence of typical hepatocytic cells which gradually lost the HCV infection markers. Gripon then characterized these cells and found that they can undergo complete hepatocyte differentiation and express liver-specific functions. Since the establishment of the HepaRG cell model, owned by INSERM, many scientists have further characterized these cells and relied on them for various applications.

== Characterization ==
HepaRG cells are bipotent progenitors, capable of differentiating into both biliary and hepatocyte lineages. The cell line exhibits key characteristics of stem cells and high cellular plasticity. Notably, both biliary-like and hepatocyte-like cell populations demonstrate the ability to undergo in vitro transdifferentiation into hepatocytic and biliary lineages. This process occurs via a hepatic progenitor intermediate, which retains active proliferative potential, highlighting the dynamic versatility of this model.

In culture, they are organized in well-delineated trabeculae with bright canaliculi-like structures under 2D and 3D configurations. They are polarized cells exhibiting three distinct domains:

1. Apical domain: this domain faces the bile canaliculi-like structures, facilitating bile secretion.
2. Basolateral domain: this domain interacts with the surrounding medium, enabling nutrient uptake and exchange with the extracellular environment.
3. Lateral domain: this domain ensures tight cell–cell junctions, maintaining structural integrity and communication between adjacent cells.

HepaRG cells have been found to secrete liver-specific proteins such as albumin and hepatokines and to express major hepatic nuclear receptors, phase I and phase II metabolism enzymes as well as drug and bile acid transporters. They also possess functional levels of phase I (CYP1A1/2, CYP2B6, CYP2Cs, CYP3A4, etc.) and phase II (UGT1A1, GSTA1, GSTA4, GSTM1) drug-metabolizing enzymes and preserve insulin signaling. Moreover, the cells can be infected by HBV, HCV, HEV and HDV and support viral replication.

HepaRG cells are used as an in vitro model for studying mitochondrial toxicity. Because their drug metabolism capacities are close to those of primary human hepatocytes, they allow the detection not only of direct mitochondrial alterations caused by parent drugs but also of indirect mitochondrial toxicity induced by their metabolites. Differentiated HepaRG cells have a high respiratory control index (RCI), reflecting their capacity for oxidative phosphorylation, and a complex II–complex IV ratio closer to that of primary hepatocytes than HepG2 cells. HepaRG cells are therefore commonly used to detect drug-induced loss of mitochondrial function and integrity, by assessing oxygen consumption, transmembrane potential, ATP production, oxidative stress, and mitochondrial DNA quantity.

One unique characteristic of HepaRG cells is that they can survive up to four weeks in culture, making them useful for long-term studies and repeated exposures to drugs and chemicals, unlike primary human hepatocytes in classical 2D cultures.

They can be cultured as mono- or co-cultures in 3D configurations, enabling more physiologically relevant experimental settings. Owing to their stable hepatic phenotype and prolonged functionality, HepaRG cells are also highly relevant for modeling chronic liver disorders, including steatosis and cholestasis, and for investigating the underlying mechanisms involved in disease development and progression.

The cells are available as undifferentiated cells that can be cultured and amplified in-house with the possibility of cell engineering, or as fully differentiated cells that are ready to use, with high inter-assay reproducibility and proven functionality across multiple applications.

== Use in research ==
HepaRG cells are considered a fit-for-all-purpose cell model, as they have been used in many applications ranging from drug discovery, drug metabolism and drug–drug interactions, chemical testing and hepatotoxicity to liver biology, liver disease and virology studies.

=== Basic research ===
The HepaRG cell model is a versatile tool for modeling various viral and parasitic infections such as hepatitis B virus (HBV), hepatitis C virus (HCV), hepatitis E virus (HEV), and hepatitis delta virus (HDV).

It is also useful for studying the interconnected pathways involved in carbohydrate homeostasis and lipid metabolism. In contrast to many other cell lines, HepaRG cells are capable of regulating glycogenolysis and gluconeogenesis at levels similar to primary human hepatocytes, as well as retaining the lipid metabolism signaling pathways.

=== Medical applications ===
HepaRG cells have shown potential in the field of regenerative medicine, specifically in the development of bio-artificial livers and liver-assisting devices. HepaRG cells have been incorporated into a microfluidic system to form a functional bio-artificial liver capable of detoxifying ammonia and other harmful substances. In addition, a modular extracorporeal liver support system combining HepaRG cells with a bioartificial scaffold has been described to support liver function. This system was shown to be effective in removing toxins from the blood and supporting liver function in animal models.

=== Industrial applications ===
Since 2003, Biopredic International has been the exclusive licensee of INSERM for HepaRG cells, made available for academic and industrial research.

=== In vitro ADMET applications ===
HepaRG cells are widely used in in vitro ADME (absorption, distribution, metabolism, and excretion) studies. They have been extensively employed to investigate drug metabolism, including phase I and phase II enzyme metabolism, as well as enzyme induction and inhibition. Additionally, HepaRG cells serve as a model for studying drug transporters, assessing compound clearance, and predicting both metabolic stability and drug–drug interactions. Beyond metabolism, HepaRG cells are used for evaluating acute and chronic drug toxicity, including genotoxicity and hepatotoxicity.

The HepaRG cell model shows high reproducibility across batches, particularly concerning drug-induced metabolic enzyme levels, which supports routine high-throughput analyses such as compound clearance studies.

=== Hepatotoxicity screening and mechanistic testing ===
HepaRG cells have been used for assessing drug-induced liver injury (DILI), including steatosis, cholestasis, and phospholipidosis, as well as for evaluating genotoxicity and carcinogenicity. Additionally, they have been used to study drug-induced mitochondrial toxicity, apoptosis, and inflammation. HepaRG cells are suitable for uptake and biliary secretion studies due to their expression of diverse uptake and efflux drug transporters and their ability to form tight junctions and bile canaliculi.

For instance, HepaRG cells have been used to evaluate the hepatotoxicity of various compounds in drug development, such as acetaminophen, troglitazone, and valproic acid, as well as environmental toxins like aflatoxin B1 and ethanol.
