= HBX (disambiguation) =

HBX may refer to:

- HBx, a hepatitis B viral protein
- Harvard Business X, a program of Harvard Business School
- Harz-Berlin-Express, a German train
- High Blast Explosive
- Hubli Airport, in Karnataka, India
- Hamengkubuwono X, current monarch of Yogyakarta
