= HBV RNA encapsidation signal epsilon =

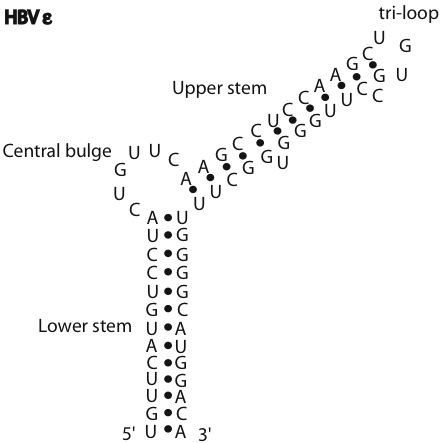
- Predicted secondary structure and sequence conservation of HBV_epsilon

Identifiers
- Symbol: HBV_epsilon
- Alt. Symbols: HBV
- Rfam: RF01047

Other data
- RNA type: Cis-reg
- Domain(s): Viruses
- GO: GO:0019079
- SO: SO:0005836
- PDB structures: PDBe

The HBV RNA encapsidation signal epsilon (HBV_epsilon) is an element essential for HBV virus replication.

It is an RNA structure situated near the 5' end of the HBV pregenomic RNA. The structure consists of a lower stem, a bulge region, an upper stem and a tri-loop. The structure was determined and refined through enzymatic probing and NMR spectroscopy. The closure of the tri-loop was not predicted by RNA structure prediction programs but observed in the NMR structure. The regions shown to be critical for encapsidation of the RNA in the viral lifecycle are the bulge, upper stem and tri-loop which interact with the terminal protein domain of the HBV viral polymerase.

== See also ==
- Heron HBV RNA encapsidation signal epsilon
- Duck HBV RNA encapsidation signal epsilon
- Hepatitis B virus PRE alpha
- Hepatitis B virus PRE beta
- Hepatitis B virus PRE 1151–1410
