= HBx =

Protein X

Identifiers
- Organism: Hepatitis B virus genotype B2 (isolate Vietnam/9873/1997)
- Symbol: X
- UniProt: P0C685
Search for
- Structures: Swiss-model
- Domains: InterPro

Transactivation protein X

Identifiers
- Symbol: ?
- Pfam: PF00739
- InterPro: IPR000236
Available protein structures:
- Pfam: structures / ECOD
- PDB: RCSB PDB; PDBe; PDBj
- PDBsum: structure summary

The genome organisation of HBV; the genes overlap. ORF X, in yellow, encodes HBx.

HBx is a hepatitis B viral protein. It is 154 amino acids long and interferes with transcription, signal transduction, cell cycle progress, protein degradation, apoptosis and chromosomal stability in the host. It forms a heterodimeric complex with its cellular target protein (HBX interacting protein: HBXIP), and this interaction dysregulates centrosome dynamics and mitotic spindle formation. It interacts with DDB1 (Damaged DNA Binding Protein 1) redirecting the ubiquitin ligase activity of the CUL4-DDB1 E3 complexes, which are intimately involved in the intracellular regulation of DNA replication and repair, transcription and signal transduction.

Although Protein X is normally absent in the Avihepadnavirus, a vestigial version has been identified in the duck hepatitis virus genome.

Although it lacks significant sequence identity with any known vertebrate proteins, it seems likely that it evolved from a DNA glycosylase.

Transgenic mice expressing the X protein in liver are more likely than the wild type to develop hepatocellular carcinoma. This is because the X protein promotes cell cycle progression while binding to and inhibiting tumor suppressor protein p53 from performing its role. Experimental observations also suggest that HBx protein increases TERT and telomerase activity, prolonging the lifespan of hepatocytes and contributing to malignant transformation.

== Molecular effects of HBx ==
HBx causes many cellular alterations. These alterations are due to direct actions of HBx and indirect actions due to large increases in intracellular reactive oxygen species (ROS) partly induced by HBx. HBx appears to dysregulate a number of cellular pathways. HBx causes dysregulation by binding to genomic DNA, changing expression patterns of miRNAs, affecting histone methyltransferases, binding to SIRT1 protein to activate transcription, and cooperating with histone methylases and demethylases to change cell expression patterns.

HBx is partly responsible for the approximate 10,000-fold increase in intracellular ROS upon chronic HBV infection. HBx can localize to the mitochondria where HBx decreases the mitochondrial membrane potential and causes increased release of ROS. In addition, other HBV proteins, HBsAg and HBcAg, also increase ROS through interactions with the endoplasmic reticulum. ROS cause more than 20 types of DNA damage. Oxidative DNA damage is mutagenic.

HBx has large effects on the transcription levels of many genes. In a transgenic mouse model expressing the HBx gene of hepatitis B virus (but not other HBV genes), most mice developed hepatic tumors. In these HBx transgenic mice there were 10,553 differentially DNA methylated regions (6,668 hypermethylated and 3,885 hypomethylated regions). In mammalian cells, large clusters of CpG dinucleotides known as CpG islands (CGIs) appear to act as key epigenetic elements regulating gene expression. Hyper-methylation of the CGIs in promoters can silence genes, while hypo-methylation of CGIs within distal exons of genes can also repress transcription of genes. A large proportion of the methylation alterations in the HBx transgenic mice were at CGIs. HBx especially induced hypo-methylation of distal intragenic CGIs required for active expression. There were 647 genes containing intragenic CGIs that were hypo-methylated in HBx transgenic mouse liver.

HBx also directly interacts with many genes. Several thousand protein-coding genes appear to have HBx-binding sites. In addition to binding to protein coding genes, HBx bound to the promoters controlling 15 microRNAs and 16 Long non-coding RNAs. For the 15 miRNAs with promoters bound by HBx, expression levels increased for eight, decreased for 5, and did not change significantly for two. Each microRNA with altered level of expression can affect the expression of several hundred messenger RNAs (see microRNA).

In addition to its effects on transcription levels of host genes, HBx seems to affect the in-vivo synthesis of pregenomic RNA (pgRNA) in HBV replicating cells. As HBx is recruited on covalently closed circular DNA (cccDNA), it decreases levels of histone acetylation by decreasing recruitment p300 acetylases and increasing recruitment of hSirtl and HDAC1 deacetylases. This, in turn, decreases heterochromatinization of HBV minichromosome, and increases the production of pgRNA. In cells infected by HBx defective mutants, levels of cccDNA remain unchanged, while there is a decrease in pgRNA transcription. Introduction of nucleus localized HBx protein seams to restore viral replication to cells infected by HBx-deficient virus.

== Relation to PRMT1 ==
In a study purifying cancerous liver cells infected with HBV, the level of expression of protein arginine methyltransferase 1 (PRMT1) was found to be associated with changes in transcription due to the methyltransferase function of PRMT1. Overexpression causes a reduction in the number of HBV genes transcribed, while conversely, underexpression causes an increase. PRMT1 was also found to be recruited by HBV DNA during the replication process to regulate the transcription process. Increased HBx expression in turn leads to an inhibition of PRMT1-mediated protein methylation, benefiting viral replication.
