= Hepatitis B virus PRE beta =

Identifiers
- Symbol: HBV_PREbeta
- Rfam: HBV_PREbeta

Other data
- RNA type: Cis-reg;
- PDB structures: PDBe

The Hepatitis B virus PRE stem-loop beta (HBV PRE SL-beta) is an RNA structure that is shown to play a role in nuclear export of HBV mRNAs.

The minimal HBV PREbeta structure consists of a 23 nt stem-loop, with a 9 nt apical loop. The conserved stem-loop was predicted within the HBV PRE sequence and confirmed by mutagenesis.

== See also ==
- Hepatitis B virus PRE alpha
- HBV RNA encapsidation signal epsilon
- Hepatitis B virus PRE 1151–1410
