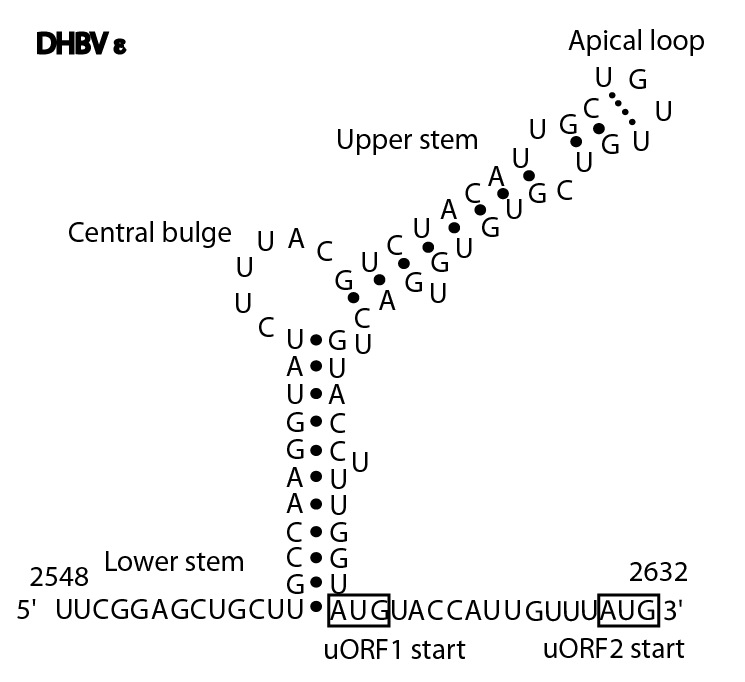
- RNA of the Epsilon structure in DHBV

Virus classification
- (unranked): Virus
- Realm: Riboviria
- Kingdom: Pararnavirae
- Phylum: Artverviricota
- Class: Revtraviricetes
- Order: Blubervirales
- Family: Hepadnaviridae
- Genus: Avihepadnavirus
- Species: Avihepadnavirus anatigruidae

= Duck hepatitis B virus =

Species of virus

Duck hepatitis B virus, abbreviated DHBV, is part of the genus Avihepadnavirus of the Hepadnaviridae, and is the causal agent of duck hepatitis B.

DHBV is a small DNA virus with a diameter of 40–45 nm. The viral envelope is made up from host cell lipid, with viral surface antigens (DHBsAg). The icosahedral nucleocapsid within, is composed of the virus core antigen (DHBcAg) and surrounds the DNA genome and viral polymerase. The viral genome is a circular double stranded DNA molecule about 3000 base pairs long. The genome has three overlapping open reading frames or ORFs:

- C-ORF – encoding the core antigen and pre-core protein which are processed and secreted as DHBcAg
- S-ORF – codes for the surface antigen DHBsAg
- P-ORF – encoding the viral polymerase.

On binding and entry of the virus to the host cell, the genome is transported to the nucleus to be transcribed. Novel viral RNA is then transferred to the cytoplasm for translation and subsequent protein synthesis.

Duck hepatitis B virus has provided a basis for the use of vaccines and prophylactic treatments for individuals at high risk of human Hepatitis B virus (HBV). The virus has also provided as a useful animal model in the absence of one from the HBV, and as scaffold for the development of chimeric virus-like particles.
