= Hepatitis B virus DNA polymerase =

Hepatitis B viral protein

Protein P (DNA polymerase / RNase H)
- The genome organisation of HBV; the genes overlap. ORF P, in blue, encodes Hepatitis B virus DNA polymerase.

Identifiers
- Organism: Hepatitis B virus ayw/France/Tiollais/1979
- Symbol: P
- UniProt: P03156
Search for
- Structures: Swiss-model
- Domains: InterPro

Protein P

Identifiers
- Symbol: ?
- InterPro: IPR037531

Hepatitis B virus DNA polymerase is a hepatitis B viral protein. It is a DNA polymerase that can use either DNA or RNA templates and a ribonuclease H that cuts RNA in the duplex. Both functions are supplied by the reverse transcriptase (RT) domain.

== Structure ==
The hepadnaviral P protein is organized into four domains: an N-terminal domain called the terminal protein (TP) (InterPro: IPR000201), a spacer domain which has no apparent function to the polymerase, a reverse transcriptase (RT) domain related to every other reverse transcriptase domain, and a C-terminal Ribonuclease H (RNase H) domain (InterPro: IPR001462).

Uniquely, the hepadnavirus terminal protein (TP) domain contains a tyrosine residue that serves as a primer for the synthesis of the (−) DNA strand.

== Function ==
The Hepatitis B virus (HBV) polymerase is a multifunctional enzyme, with both RNA-dependent and DNA-dependent polymerase functions, as well as an RNase H function. It acts on the HBV pre-genomic RNA (pgRNA) to reverse transcribe it to form a new rcDNA molecule within a new capsid. (The pgRNA has another function of being translated into the viral polymerase and core proteins).

HBV core protein dimers are required for packaging of the pgRNA/polymerase complex. Then, after viral polymerase binds to the packaging signal (Hɛ) found at the 5′ end of the pgRNA, they are incorporated into the viral capsid.

Inside the capsid, the pgRNA undergoes reverse transcription, which is initiated by protein priming at the tyrosine residue of the HBV polymerase. Thus, the (−) DNA strand is made. At the same time, the RNA template is degraded by the RNase H activity of the polymerase. A short RNA of about 15–18 nucleotides at the 5′ end of the pgRNA (including the 5′ DR1 sequence) is not degraded and it is used as primer for (+) DNA strand synthesis.

The resulting RC-DNA is partially double stranded. The (−) DNA strand is longer than a genome length, with a covalently bound polymerase and a redundant flap at the 5′ end. However, the (+) DNA strand synthesis is uncompleted by the polymerase, and there is a gap exists down to the 3′ end of the (+) DNA strand.
