= Hepatitis B virus PRE 1151–1410 =

- Predicted secondary structure and sequence conservation of Hepatitis B virus PRE 1151–1410

Identifiers
- Rfam: RF02816

Other data
- Domain(s): Viruses
- GO: GO:0051168,GO:0043484
- SO: SO:0005836
- PDB structures: PDBe

Hepatitis B virus PRE 1151–1410 (HBV post-transcriptional regulatory element, nucleotides 1151–1410) is a part of 500 base pair long HBV PRE, that has been proposed to be the hepatitis B virus (HBV) RNA export element. However, the function is controversial and new regulatory elements have been predicted within PRE. PRE 1151–1410 enhances nuclear export of intronless transcripts and represses the splicing mechanism to a comparable degree to that of the full-length PRE. Hence it was proposed to be the core HBV PRE element. PRE1151–1410 contains 3 known regulatory elements: PRE SL-alpha (nucleotides 1292–1321), human La protein binding site (nucleotide 1275–1291), SRE-1 (nucleotides 1252–1348).

== See also ==
- HBV PRE SL alpha
- HBV PRE SL beta
- HBV RNA encapsidation signal epsilon
