= Defense associated reverse transcriptase =

Defense-associated reverse transcriptase (DRT) ribonucleoprotein complexes are a class of prokaryotic antiviral systems composed of reverse transcriptase enzymes and associated non-coding RNAs (ncRNAs). These complexes function as part of bacterial and archaeal defense mechanisms against bacteriophage infection and are characterized by their ability to synthesize nucleic acids.

DRT systems belong to a broader group of reverse transcriptase (RT) associated defense elements. Unlike classical reverse transcriptases, which copy RNA into DNA using standard template dependent mechanisms, DRT complexes frequently employ hybrid strategies involving RNA templates, protein templating, or template-independent polymerization.

== DRT features ==
DRT ribonucleoprotein complexes typically include one or more reverse transcriptase proteins and a structured ncRNA. The ncRNA component is responsible for: template for DNA synthesis; structural scaffold for assembly of the complex; and regulatory element controlling enzymatic activity.

DRT ribonucleoprotein complexes share features with several well-known biological systems:

- Telomerase: uses an internal RNA template for repeat synthesis
- CRISPR-Cas systems: RNA-guided antiviral defense mechanisms
- Group II introns: mobile elements encoding reverse transcriptases

Unlike this ribonucleoprotein complexes, DRT use protein-templated synthesis and produce repetitive DNA products.

== Representative DRT systems ==
=== DRT2 ===
DRT2 systems produce long repetitive complement DNA concatemers, in some cases assembling sequences not directly encoded in the genome. The associated ncRNA is thought to contribute to the synthesis process, acting as a template or structural guide.

=== DRT3 ===
DRT3 consists of two distinct reverse transcriptases Drt3a and Drt3b and an structured ncRNA. The ncRNA contains a conserved ACACAC motif that acts as a template for DNA synthesis.

Drt3a synthesizes a poly(GT) DNA strand using the ncRNA template while Drt3b synthesizes the complementary poly(AC) strand without a nucleic acid template, using a protein-templated mechanism. This system produces double-stranded repetitive DNA.

=== DRT9 ===
DRT9 systems synthesize poly(A)-rich DNA products and are also associated with an ncRNA component. Structural studies have shown that the ncRNA is required for assembly and activation of the complex, mediates oligomerization of the reverse transcriptase.

== Mechanism of action ==
DRT complexes are generally activated during phage infection. They use reverse transcriptase activity to synthesize DNA or RNA products that interfere with phage replication or viability. Distinctive mechanistic features include:

- RNA-templated DNA synthesis (similar to telomerase)
- Template-independent polymerization
- Protein-templated nucleotide incorporation
- Generation of repetitive or low-complexity nucleic acid products
