= Hepatitis B virus PRE alpha =

Identifiers
- Symbol: HBV_PREalpha
- Rfam: HBV_PREalpha

Other data
- RNA type: Cis-reg;
- PDB structures: PDBe

The Hepatitis B virus PRE stem-loop alpha (HBV PRE SL alpha) is an RNA structure that is shown to play a role in nuclear export of HBV mRNAs.

HBV PREalpha consists of a 30 nt stem-loop, with a 5 nt apical loop. The conserved stem-loop was predicted within the HBV PRE sequence and confirmed by mutagenesis.

The exact role of this structure in nuclear export has not yet been determined.

== See also ==
- Hepatitis B virus PRE beta
- HBV RNA encapsidation signal epsilon
- Hepatitis_B virus PRE 1151–1410
