= Viral replication =

Formation of biological viruses during the infection process

Viral replication is the formation of biological viruses during the infection process in the target host cells. Viruses must first get into the cell before viral replication can occur. Through the generation of abundant copies of its genome and packaging these copies, the virus continues infecting new hosts. Replication between viruses is greatly varied and depends on the type of genes involved in them. Most DNA viruses assemble in the nucleus while most RNA viruses develop solely in cytoplasm.

== Viral production / replication ==
Viruses multiply only in living cells. The host cell must provide the energy and synthetic machinery and the low-molecular-weight precursors for the synthesis of viral proteins and nucleic acids.

Virus replication occurs in seven stages:

1. Attachment
2. Entry (penetration)
3. Uncoating
4. Replication
5. Assembly
6. Maturation
7. Release (liberation stage).

=== Attachment ===
It is the first step of viral replication. Some viruses attach to the cell membrane of the host cell and inject its DNA or RNA into the host to initiate infection. Attachment to a host cell is often achieved by a virus attachment protein that extends from the protein shell (capsid), of a virus. This protein is responsible for binding to a surface receptor on the plasma membrane (or membrane carbohydrates) of a host cell. Viruses can exploit normal cell receptor functions to allow attachment to occur by mimicking molecules that bind to host cell receptors. For example, the rhinovirus uses their virus attachment protein to bind to the receptor ICAM-1on host cells that is normally used to facilitate adhesion between other host cells.

=== Entry ===
Entry, or penetration, is the second step in viral replication. This step is characterized by the virus passing through the plasma membrane of the host cell. The most common way a virus gains entry to the host cell is by receptor-mediated endocytosis, which comes at no energy cost to the virus, only the host cell. Receptor-mediated endocytosis occurs when a molecule (in this case a virus) binds to receptor on the membrane of the cell. A series of chemical signals from this binding causes the cell to wrap the attached virus in the plasma membrane around it forming a virus-containing vesicle inside the cell.

Viruses enter host cells using a variety of mechanisms, including the endocytic and non-endocytic routes. They can also fuse at the plasma membrane and can spread within the host via fusion or cell-cell fusion. Viruses attach to proteins on the host cell surface known as cellular receptors or attachment factors to aid entry. Evidence shows that viruses utilize ion channels on the host cells during viral entry. Fusion: External viral proteins promote the fusion of the virion with the plasma membrane. This forms a pore in the host membrane, and after entry, the virion becomes uncoated, and its genomic material is then transferred into the cytoplasm. Cell-to-cell fusion: Some viruses prompt specific protein expression on the surfaces of infected cells to attract uninfected cells. This interaction causes the uninfected cell to fuse with the infected cell at lower pH levels to form a multinuclear cell known as a syncytium. Endocytic routes: the process by which an intracellular vesicle is formed by membrane invagination, which results in the engulfment of extracellular and membrane-bound components, in this context, a virus. Non-endocytic routes: the process by which viral particles are released into the cell by fusion of the extracellular viral envelope and the membrane of the host cell.

=== Uncoating ===
Uncoating is the third step in viral replication. Uncoating is defined by the removal of the virion's protein "coat" and the release of its genetic material. This step occurs in the same area that viral transcription occurs. Different viruses have various mechanisms for uncoating. Some RNA viruses such as Rhinoviruses use the low pH in a host cell's endosomes to activate their uncoating mechanism. This involves the rhinovirus releasing a protein that creates holes in the endosome, and allows the virus to release its genome through the holes. Many DNA viruses travel to the host cells nucleus and release their genetic material through nuclear pores.

=== Replication ===
The fourth step in the viral cycle is replication, which is defined by the rapid production of the viral genome. How a virus undergoes replication relies on the type of genetic material the virus possesses. Based on their genetic material, viruses will appropriate the corresponding cellular machinery for said genetic material. Viruses that contain double-stranded DNA (dsDNA) share the same kind of genetic material as all cellular life, and can therefore use the replication enzymes in the host cell nucleus to replicate directly. Many RNA viruses typically replicate in the cytosol, and can directly access the host cell's ribosomes to manufacture viral proteins once the RNA is in a replicative form.

Viruses may undergo two types of life cycles: the lytic cycle and the lysogenic cycle. In the lytic cycle, the virus introduces its genome into a host cell and initiates replication by hijacking the host's cellular machinery to make new copies of the virus. In the lysogenic life cycle, the viral genome is incorporated into the host genome. The host genome will undergo its normal life cycle, replicating and dividing replicating the viral genome along with its own. The viral genome can be triggered to begin viral production via chemical and environmental stimulants. Once a lysogenic virus enters the lytic life cycle, it will continue in the viral production pathways and proceed with transcription / mRNA production. (ex: Cold sores, herpes simplex virus (HSV)-1, lysogenic bacteriophages, etc.)

=== Assembly ===
Assembly is when the newly manufactured viral proteins and genomes are gathered and put together to form immature viruses. Like the other steps, how a particular virus is assembled is dependent on what type of virus it is. Assembly can occur in the plasma membrane, cytosol, nucleus, golgi apparatus, and other locations within the host cell. Some viruses only insert their genome into a capsid once the capsid is completed, while in other viruses the capsid will wrap around the genome as it is being copied.

=== Maturation ===
This is the final step before a competent virus is formed. This typically involves capsid modifications that are provided by enzymes (host or virus-encoded).

=== Release (liberation stage) ===
The final step in viral replication is release, which is when the newly assembled and mature viruses leave the host cell. How a virus releases from the host cell is dependent on the type of virus it is. One common type of release is budding. This occurs when viruses that form their envelope from the host's plasma membrane bend the membrane around the capsid. As the virus bends the plasma membrane it begins to wrap around the whole capsid until the virus is no longer attached to the host cell. Another common way viruses leave the host cell is through cell lysis, where the viruses lyse the cell causing it to burst which releases mature viruses that were in the host cell.

== Baltimore classification ==
Viruses are split into seven classes, according to the type of genetic material and method of mRNA production, each of which has its own families of viruses, which in turn have differing replication strategies themselves. David Baltimore, a Nobel Prize-winning biologist, devised a system called the Baltimore Classification System to classify different viruses based on their unique replication strategy. There are seven different replication strategies based on this system (Baltimore Class I, II, III, IV, V, VI, VII). The seven classes of viruses are listed here briefly and in generalities.

=== Class 1: Double-stranded DNA viruses ===
This type of virus usually must enter the host nucleus before it is able to replicate. Some of these viruses require host cell polymerases to replicate their genome, while others, such as adenoviruses or herpes viruses, encode their own replication factors. However, in either case, replication of the viral genome is highly dependent on a cellular state permissive to DNA replication and, thus, on the cell cycle. The virus may induce the cell to forcefully undergo cell division, which may lead to transformation of the cell and, ultimately, cancer. An example of a family within this classification is the Adenoviridae.

There is only one well-studied example in which a class 1 family of viruses does not replicate within the nucleus. This is the Poxvirus family, which comprises highly pathogenic viruses that infect vertebrates.

=== Class 2: Single-stranded DNA viruses ===
Viruses that fall under this category include ones that are not as well-studied, but still do pertain highly to vertebrates. Two examples include the Circoviridae and Parvoviridae. They replicate within the nucleus, and form a double-stranded DNA intermediate during replication. A human Anellovirus called TTV is included within this classification and is found in almost all humans, infecting them asymptomatically in nearly every major organ.

RNA viruses: The polymerase of RNA viruses lacks the proofreading functions found in the polymerase of DNA viruses. This contributed to RNA viruses having lower replicative fidelity compared to DNA viruses, causing RNA viruses to be highly mutagenic, which can increase their overall survival rate. RNA viruses lack the capacity to identify and repair mismatched or damaged nucleotides, and thus, RNA genomes are prone to mutations introduced by mechanisms intrinsic and extrinsic to viral replication. RNA viruses present a therapeutic double-edged sword: RNA viruses can withstand the challenge of antiviral drugs, cause epidemics, and infect multiple host species due to their mutagenic nature, making them difficult to treat. However, the reverse transcriptase protein that often comes with the RNA virus can be used as an indirect target for RNA viruses, preventing transcription and synthesis of viral particles. (This is the basis for anti-AIDs and anti-HIV drugs)

=== Class 3: Double-stranded RNA viruses ===
Like most viruses with RNA genomes, double-stranded RNA viruses do not rely on host polymerases for replication to the extent that viruses with DNA genomes do. Double-stranded RNA viruses are not as well-studied as other classes. This class includes two major families, the Reoviridae and Birnaviridae. Replication is monocistronic and includes individual, segmented genomes, meaning that each of the genes codes for only one protein, unlike other viruses, which exhibit more complex translation.

=== Classes 4 & 5: Single-stranded RNA viruses ===
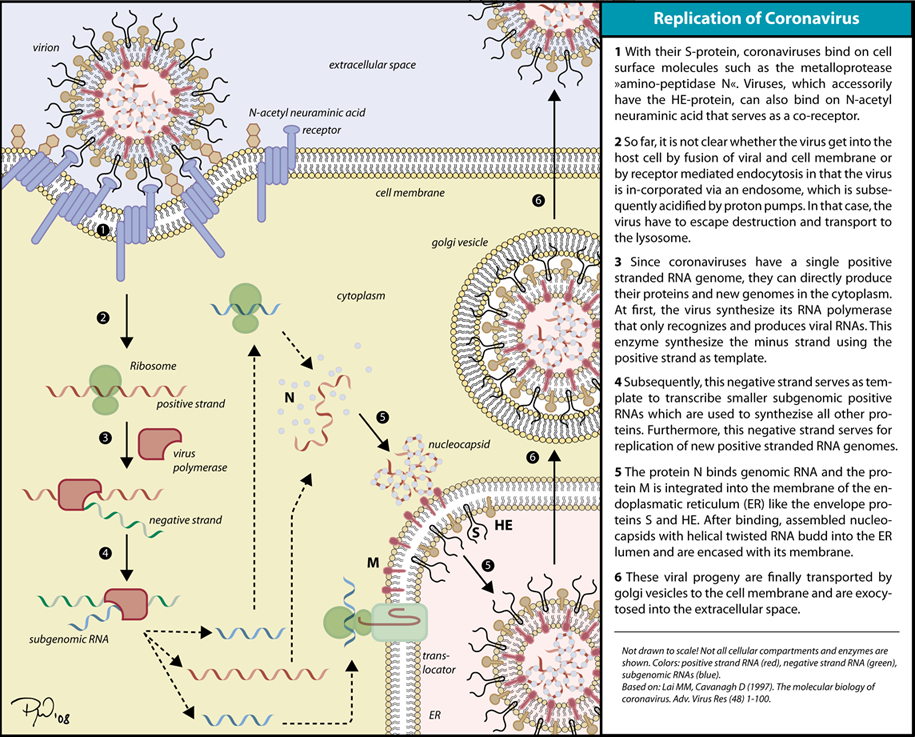
Replication cycle of a coronavirus (class 4)

These viruses consist of two types, however both share the fact that replication is primarily in the cytoplasm, and that replication is not as dependent on the cell cycle as that of DNA viruses. This class of viruses is also one of the most-studied types of viruses, alongside the double-stranded DNA viruses.

==== Class 4: Single-stranded RNA viruses - positive-sense ====
The positive-sense RNA viruses and indeed all genes defined as positive-sense can be directly accessed by host ribosomes to immediately form proteins. These can be divided into two groups, both of which replicate in the cytoplasm:

- Viruses with polycistronic mRNA where the genome RNA forms the mRNA and is translated into a polyprotein product that is subsequently cleaved to form the mature proteins. This means that the gene can utilize a few methods in which to produce proteins from the same strand of RNA, reducing the size of its genome.
- Viruses with complex transcription, for which subgenomic mRNAs, ribosomal frameshifting and proteolytic processing of polyproteins may be used. All of which are different mechanisms with which to produce proteins from the same strand of RNA.

Examples of this class include the families Coronaviridae, Flaviviridae, and Picornaviridae.

==== Class 5: Single-stranded RNA viruses - negative-sense ====
The negative-sense RNA viruses and indeed all genes defined as negative-sense cannot be directly accessed by host ribosomes to immediately form proteins. Instead, they must be transcribed by viral polymerases into the "readable" complementary positive-sense. These can also be divided into two groups:

- Viruses containing nonsegmented genomes for which the first step in replication is transcription from the negative-stranded genome by the viral RNA-dependent RNA polymerase to yield monocistronic mRNAs that code for the various viral proteins. A positive-sense genome copy that serves as template for production of the negative-strand genome is then produced. Replication is within the cytoplasm.
- Viruses with segmented genomes for which replication occurs in the cytoplasm and for which the viral RNA-dependent RNA polymerase produces monocistronic mRNAs from each genome segment.

Examples in this class include the families Orthomyxoviridae, Paramyxoviridae, Bunyaviridae, Filoviridae, and Rhabdoviridae (which includes rabies).

=== Class 6: Positive-sense single-stranded RNA viruses that replicate through a DNA intermediate ===
A well-studied family of this class of viruses include the retroviruses. One defining feature is the use of reverse transcriptase to convert the positive-sense RNA into DNA. Instead of using the RNA for templates of proteins, they use DNA to create the templates, which is spliced into the host genome using integrase. Replication can then commence with the help of the host cell's polymerases.

=== Class 7: Double-stranded DNA viruses that replicate through a single-stranded RNA intermediate ===
This small group of viruses, exemplified by the Hepatitis B virus, have a double-stranded, gapped genome that is subsequently filled in to form a covalently closed circle (cccDNA) that serves as a template for production of viral mRNAs and a subgenomic RNA. The pregenome RNA serves as template for the viral reverse transcriptase and for production of the DNA genome.
