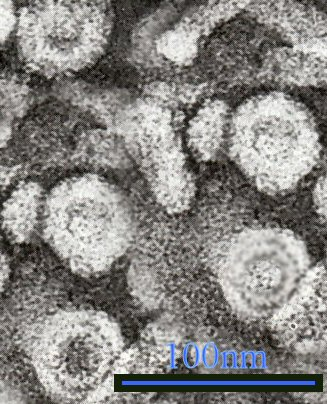
- TEM micrograph showing Hepatitis B virus virions

Virus classification
- (unranked): Virus
- Realm: Riboviria
- Kingdom: Pararnavirae
- Phylum: Artverviricota
- Class: Revtraviricetes
- Order: Blubervirales
- Family: Hepadnaviridae

= Hepadnaviridae =

Family of viruses

Hepadnaviridae (Note: Etymology – portmanteau of hepa (liver: reference to Hepatitis B the primary human member) DNA virus.) is a family of viruses. Humans, apes, and birds serve as natural hosts. The family contains five genera. Its best-known member is hepatitis B virus. Diseases associated with this family include: liver infections, such as hepatitis, hepatocellular carcinomas (chronic infections), and cirrhosis. It is the sole accepted family in the order Blubervirales.

== Taxonomy ==
The following genera are recognized:

- Avihepadnavirus
- Orthohepadnavirus
- Herpetohepadnavirus
- Metahepadnavirus
- Parahepadnavirus

== History and discovery ==
Although liver diseases transmissible among human populations were identified early in the history of medicine, the first known hepatitis with a viral etiological agent was Hepatitis A, in the picornaviridae family. Hepatitis B Virus (HBV) was identified as an infection distinct from Hepatitis A through its contamination of yellow fever vaccine. The vaccine contained human serum as a stabilizing agent which was HBV-infected. HBV was identified as a new DNA virus in the 1960s, followed a couple of decades later by the discovery of the flavivirus hepatitis C. HBV was first identified in the lab as the "Australia agent" by Blumberg and colleagues in the blood of an Aboriginal transfusion patient. This work earned Blumberg the 1976 Nobel Prize in Medicine.

== Genome ==
The genome organisation of HBV; the genes overlap

Hepadnaviruses have very small genomes of partially double-stranded, partially single stranded circular DNA (pdsDNA). The genome consists of two strands, a longer negative-sense strand and a shorter and positive-sense strand of variable length. In the virion these strands are arranged such that the two ends of the long strand meet but are not covalently bonded together. The shorter strand overlaps this divide and is connected to the longer strand on either side of the split through a direct repeat (DR) segment that pairs the two strands together. In replication, the viral pdsDNA is converted in the host cell nucleus to covalently-closed-circular DNA (cccDNA) by the viral polymerase.

Replication involves an RNA intermediate, as in viruses belonging to group VII of Baltimore classification. Four main open reading frames are encoded (ORFs) and the virus has four known genes which encode seven proteins: the core capsid protein, the viral polymerase, surface antigens—preS1, preS2, and S, the X protein and HBeAg. The X protein is thought to be non-structural. Its function and significance are poorly understood but it is suspected to be associated with host gene expression modulation.

=== Viral polymerase ===
Members of the family Hepadnaviridae encode their own polymerase, rather than co-opting host machinery as some other viruses do. This enzyme is unique among viral polymerases in that it has reverse transcriptase activity to convert RNA into DNA to replicate the genome (the only other human-pathogenic virus family encoding a polymerase with this capability is Retroviridae), RNAse activity (used when the DNA genome is synthesized from pgRNA that was packaged in virions for replication to destroy the RNA template and produce the pdsDNA genome), and DNA-dependent-DNA-polymerase activity (used to create cccDNA from pdsDNA in the first step of the replication cycle).

=== Envelope proteins ===
The hepatitis envelope proteins are composed of subunits made from the viral preS1, preS2, and S genes. The L (for "large") envelope protein contains all three subunits. The M (for "medium") protein contains only preS2 and S. The S (for "small") protein contains only S. The genome portions encoding these envelope protein subunits share both the same frame and the same stop codon, generating nested transcripts on a single open reading frame. The pre-S1 is encoded first (closest to the 5' end), followed directly by the pre-S2 and the S. When a transcript is made from the beginning of the pre-S1 region, all three genes are included in the transcript and the L protein is produced. When the transcript starts after the pro-S1 at the beginning of the pre-S2 the final protein contains the pre-S2 and S subunits only and therefore is an M protein. The smallest envelope protein containing just the S subunit is made most because it is encoded closest to the 3' end and comes from the shortest transcript. These envelope proteins can assemble independently of the viral capsid and genome into non-infectious virus-like particles that give the virus a pleomorphic appearance and promote a strong immune response in hosts.

== Replication ==
Hepadnaviruses replicate through an RNA intermediate (which they transcribe back into cDNA using reverse transcriptase). The reverse transcriptase becomes covalently linked to a short 3- or 4-nucleotide primer. Most hepadnaviruses will only replicate in specific hosts, and this makes experiments using in vitro methods very difficult.

The virus binds to specific receptors on cells and the core particle enters the cell cytoplasm. This is then translocated to the nucleus, where the partially double stranded DNA is 'repaired' by the viral polymerase to form a complete circular dsDNA genome (called covalently-closed-circular DNA or cccDNA). The genome then undergoes transcription by the host cell RNA polymerase and the pregenomicRNA (pgRNA) is sent out of the nucleus. The pgRNA is inserted into an assembled viral capsid containing the viral polymerase. Inside this capsid the genome is converted from RNA to pdsDNA through activity of the polymerase as an RNA-dependent-DNA-polymerase and subsequently as an RNAse to eliminate the pgRNA transcript. These new virions either leave the cell to infect others or are immediately dismantled so the new viral genomes can enter the nucleus and magnify the infection. The virions that leave the cell egress through budding.

Genus	Host details	Tissue tropism	Entry details	Release details	Replication site	Assembly site	Transmission
Avihepadnavirus	Birds	Hepatocytes	Cell receptor endocytosis	Budding	Nucleus	Cytoplasm	Vertical: parental; sex; blood
Orthohepadnavirus	Humans; mammals	Hepatocytes	Cell receptor endocytosis	Budding	Nucleus	Cytoplasm	Vertical: parental; sex; blood

== Structure ==
Viruses in Hepadnaviridae are enveloped, with spherical geometries, and T=4 symmetry. The diameter is around 42 nm. Genomes are circular, around 3.2kb in length. The genome codes for 7 proteins.

Genus	Structure	Symmetry	Capsid	Genomic arrangement	Genomic segmentation
Avihepadnavirus	Icosahedral	T=4	Enveloped	Circular	Monopartite
Orthohepadnavirus	Icosahedral	T=4	Enveloped	Circular	Monopartite

== Evolution ==
Based on the presence of viral genomes in bird DNA it appears that the hepadnaviruses evolved >82 million years ago. Birds may be the original hosts of the Hepadnaviridae with mammals becoming infected after a bird (see host switch).

Endogenous hepatitis B virus genomes have been described in crocodilian, snake and turtle genomes. This suggests that these viruses have infected vertebrates for over 200 million years ago.

Hepadnaviruses have been described in fish and amphibians also. This suggests that this family has co-evolved with the vertebrates.

Phylogenetic trees suggest that the bird viruses originated from those infecting reptiles. Those affecting mammals appear to be more closely related to those found in fish.

=== Nackednaviridae ===
A proposed family of viruses – the Nackednaviridae – has been isolated from fish. This family has a similar genomic organisation to that of members of the family Hepadnaviridae. These two families separated over 400 million years ago, suggesting an ancient origin for the family Hepadnaviridae.

Viruses in the family have non-enveloped, isosahedral structure with T=3 symmetry, smaller than typical Hepadnaviridae virions (about 5% of the latter show a T=3 symmetry). The circular, monopartite genome is about 3 kb much like Hepadnaviridae. The envelop protein S is accordingly not present, likely the ancestral state by sequence analysis. Unlike Hepadnaviridae viruses that usually diverge alongside their hosts, viruses in the family jump hosts more frequently. The "type" for this family is African cichlid nackednavirus'(ACNDV), formerly African cichlid hepadnavirus (ACHBV), a proposed and not-yet-accepted species.

== Cell tropism ==
Hepadnaviruses, as their "hepa" name implies, infect liver cells and cause hepatitis. This is true not only of the human pathogen Hepatitis B Virus but also the hepadnaviruses that infect other organisms. The "adhesion" step of the dynamic phase—in which an exterior viral protein stably interacts with a host cell protein—determines cell tropism. In the case of HBV the host receptor is human sodium taurocholate receptor (NTCP), a mediator of bile acid uptake, and the virus anti-receptor is the abundant HB-AgS envelope protein.

== See also ==
- Transmission of hepadnaviruses
