= Hep G2 =

Human liver cancer cell line

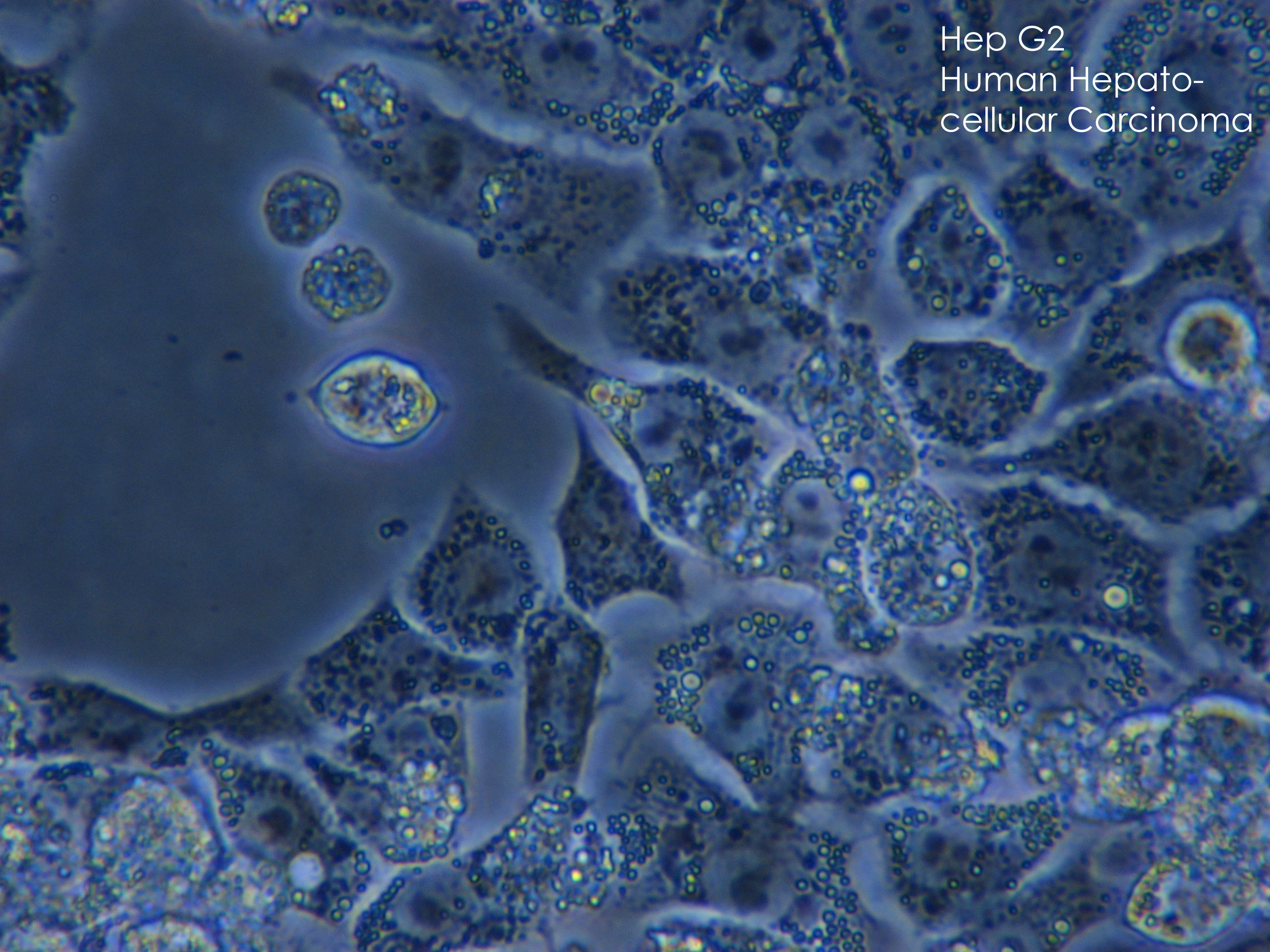
Hep G2 Cells

Hep G2 (or HepG2) is a human liver cancer cell line.

Hep G2 is an immortal cell line which was derived in 1975 from the liver tissue of a 15-year-old Caucasian male from Argentina with a well-differentiated hepatoblastoma carcinoma. These cells are epithelial in morphology, have a modal chromosome number of 55, and are not tumorigenic in nude mice. The cells secrete a variety of major plasma proteins, e.g., albumin, and the acute-phase proteins fibrinogen, alpha 2-macroglobulin, alpha 1-antitrypsin, transferrin and plasminogen. They have been grown successfully in large-scale cultivation systems. Hepatitis B virus surface antigens have not been detected. Hep G2 will respond to stimulation with human growth hormone.

Hep G2 cells are a suitable in vitro model system for the study of polarized human hepatocytes. Another well-characterized polarized hepatocyte cell line is the rat hepatoma-derived hybrid cell line WIF-B. With the proper culture conditions, Hep G2 cells display robust morphological and functional differentiation with a controllable formation of apical and basolateral cell surface domains (van IJzendoorn et al., 1997; 2000, etc.) that resemble the bile canalicular (BC) and sinusoidal domains, respectively, in vivo.

Because of their high degree of morphological and functional differentiation in vitro, Hep G2 cells are a suitable model to study the intracellular trafficking and dynamics of bile canalicular, sinusoidal membrane proteins, and lipids in human hepatocytes in vitro. This can be important for the study of human liver diseases that are caused by an incorrect subcellular distribution of cell surface proteins, e.g., hepatocanalicular transport defects such as Dubin-Johnson Syndrome and progressive familial intrahepatic cholestasis (PFIC), and familial hypercholesterolemia. Hep G2 cells and their derivatives are also used as a model system for studies of liver metabolism and toxicity of xenobiotics, the detection of environmental and dietary cytotoxic and genotoxic (and thus cytoprotective, anti-genotoxic, and cogenotoxic) agents, understanding hepatocarcinogenesis, and for drug targeting studies. Hep G2 cells are also employed in trials with bio-artificial liver devices.
