= Avihepadnavirus =

Virus classification
- (unranked): Virus
- Realm: Riboviria
- Kingdom: Pararnavirae
- Phylum: Artverviricota
- Class: Revtraviricetes
- Order: Blubervirales
- Family: Hepadnaviridae
- Genus: Avihepadnavirus

Genus of viruses

Avihepadnavirus is a genus of viruses, in the family Hepadnaviridae. Birds serve as natural hosts. There are five species in this genus. Diseases associated with this genus include: hepatitis, hepatocellular carcinomas (chronic infections), and cirrhosis.

== Taxonomy ==
The genus contains the following species, listed by scientific name and followed by the exemplar virus of the species:

- Avihepadnavirus anatigruidae, Duck hepatitis B virus – also includes SHGHBV, SGHBV, CHBV, and RGHBV
- Avihepadnavirus ciconiardeae, Heron hepatitis B virus – also includes STHBV
- Avihepadnavirus psittaunius, Parrot hepatitis B virus 1
- Avihepadnavirus psittaduorum, Parrot hepatitis B virus 2
- Avihepadnavirus bonicursoris, Elegant-crested tinamou hepatitis B virus

== Structure ==
Viruses in the genus Avihepadnavirus are enveloped, with spherical geometries, and T=4 symmetry. The diameter is around 42 nm. Genomes are circular, around 3.2kb in length. The genome codes for 7 proteins.

Genus	Structure	Symmetry	Capsid	Genomic arrangement	Genomic segmentation
Avihepadnavirus	Icosahedral	T=4	Non-enveloped	Circular	Monopartite

== Life cycle ==
Viral replication is nucleo-cytoplasmic. Replication follows the dsDNA(RT) replication model. DNA-templated transcription, specifically dsDNA-RT transcription, with some alternative splicing mechanism is the method of transcription. Translation takes place by ribosomal shunting. The virus exits the host cell by budding, and nuclear pore export. Birds serve as the natural host. Transmission routes are parental, sexual, and blood.

Genus	Host details	Tissue tropism	Entry details	Release details	Replication site	Assembly site	Transmission
Avihepadnavirus	Birds	Hepatocytes	Cell receptor endocytosis	Budding	Nucleus	Cytoplasm	Vertical: parental; sex; blood
