= Fever of unknown origin =

- Other names: Pyrexia of unknown origin, febris e causa ignota
- Duration: ≥3 weeks
- Types: Various
- Causes: Infections, malignancies, non-infectious inflammatory diseases, others
- Diagnostic method: Clinician-verified temperature at or above 38.3 °C (100.9 °F) at any measurement site on several occasions over at least 3 weeks.
- Differential diagnosis: Factitious fever, malingering
- Frequency: 2–3 % of all medical admissions

Fever of unknown origin (FUO) refers to a condition in which the patient has an elevated temperature (fever) for which no cause can be found despite investigations by one or more qualified physicians. If the cause is found, it is usually a diagnosis of exclusion, eliminating all possibilities until only the correct explanation remains.

In the West, the classical medical definition of the FUO required a clinician-verified measurement of temperature of ≥38.3 °C (100.9 °F) at any site on several (varied) occasions over 3 weeks, though in the recent years the threshold of ≥38.0 °C (100.4 °F) has been becoming increasingly more prevalent.

== Causes ==
Worldwide, infection is the leading cause of FUO, with prevalence varying by country and geographic region. Extrapulmonary tuberculosis is the most frequent cause of FUO. Drug-induced hyperthermia, as the sole symptom of an adverse drug reaction, should always be considered. Disseminated granulomatoses such as tuberculosis, histoplasmosis, coccidioidomycosis, blastomycosis, and sarcoidosis are associated with FUO. Lymphomas are the most common cause of FUO in adults. Thromboembolic disease (i.e., pulmonary embolism, deep venous thrombosis) occasionally causes a fever. Although infrequent, its potentially lethal consequences warrant evaluation of this cause. Infective endocarditis, although uncommon, is possible. Bartonella infections are also known to cause fever of unknown origin.

Human herpes viruses are a common cause of fever of unknown origin with one study showing Cytomegalovirus, Epstein–Barr virus, human herpesvirus 6 (HHV-6), human herpesvirus 7 (HHV-7) being present in 15%, 10%, 14% and 4.8% respectively with 10% of people presenting with co-infection (infection with two or more human herpes viruses). Infectious mononucleosis, most commonly caused by EBV, may present as a fever of unknown origin. Other symptoms of infectious mononucleosis vary with age with middle-aged adults and the elderly more likely to have a longer duration of fever and leukopenia, and younger adults and adolescents more likely to have splenomegaly, pharyngitis and lymphadenopathy.

Endemic mycoses such as histoplasmosis, blastomycosis, coccidioidomycosis, and paracoccidioidomycosis can cause a fever of unknown origin in immunocompromised as well as immunocompetent people. These endemic mycoses may also present with pulmonary symptoms or extra-pulmonary symptoms such as B symptoms (such as fevers, chills, night sweats, and unexplained weight loss). The endemic mycotic infection talaromycosis primarily affects those who are immunocompromised. Invasive opportunistic mycoses may also occur in immunocompromised people; these include aspergillosis, mucormycosis, Cryptococcus neoformans.

Cancer can also cause a fever of unknown origin. This is thought to be due to release of pyrogenic cytokines from cancer cells as well as due to spontaneous tumor necrosis (sometimes with secondary infections). The cancer types most associated with fever of unknown origin include renal cell carcinoma, lymphoma, liver cancer, ovarian cancer atrial myxoma and Castleman disease.

In those with HIV currently being treated with antiretroviral therapy and with a low or undetectable viral load, the causes of fever of unknown origin are usually not associated with HIV infection. But in those with AIDS, with high viral loads, viral replication, and immune compromise; cancers and opportunistic infection are the most common cause of FUO. Approximately 2 weeks after initial HIV infection, with viral loads being high, an acute retroviral syndrome can present with fevers, rash and mono-like symptoms.

Immune reconstitution inflammatory syndrome is a common cause of FUO when a previously suppressed immune system is reactivated. The newly active immune system often has an exaggerated response against opportunistic pathogens, leading to a fever and other inflammatory symptoms. Immune reconstitution syndrome commonly presents after microbiological control of infection (in cases of immunosuppressing pathogens such as HIV), but the syndrome may also present after organ transplant, in the post-partum state, with formerly neutropenic hosts, or after withdrawing anti-TNF therapy.

Auto-inflammatory and auto-immune disorders account for approximately 5-32% of fevers of unknown origin. These can be classified as purely auto-inflammatory disorders (disorders of innate immunity, with dysregulated interleukin 1 beta and/or IL-18 responses), purely auto-immune disorders (in which the adaptive immunity is dysregulated, with a dysregulated type 1 interferon response) or disorders with mixed features. Rheumatoid arthritis or adult-onset Still's disease have mixed features and are common causes of FUO.

=== Infection ===
Infection cause	
Localized pyogenic infections	Appendicitis; Cat-scratch disease; Cholangitis; Cholecystitis; Dental abscess; Diverticulitis/abscess; Lesser sac abscess; Liver abscess; Mesenteric lymphadenitis; Osteomyelitis; Pancreatic abscess; Pelvic inflammatory disease; Perinephric/intrarenal abscess; Prostatic abscess; Renal malakoplakia; Sinusitis; Subphrenic abscess; Suppurative Thrombophlebitis; Tubo-ovarian abscess
Intravascular infections	Bacterial aortitis; Bacterial endocarditis; Vascular catheter infection
Systemic bacterial infections	Bartonellosis; Brucellosis; Campylobacter infection; Cat-scratch disease/bacillary angiomatosis (B. henselae); Gonococcemia; Legionnaires' disease; Leptospirosis; Listeriosis; Lyme disease; Melioidosis; Meningococcemia; Rat-bite fever; Relapsing fever; Salmonellosis; Syphilis; Tularemia; Typhoid fever; Vibriosis; Yersinia infection
Mycobacterial infections	M. avium/M. intracellulare infections; Other atypical mycobacterial infections; Tuberculosis
Other bacterial infections	Actinomycosis; Bacillary angiomatosis; Nocardiosis; Whipple's disease
Rickettsial infections	Anaplasmosis; Ehrlichiosis; Murine typhus; Q fever; Rickettsialpox; Rocky Mountain spotted fever; Scrub typhus
Chlamydial infections	Lymphogranuloma venereum; Psittacosis; TWAR (C. pneumoniae) infection
Viral infections	Chikungunya fever; Colorado tick fever; Coxsackie B virus infection; Cytomegalovirus infection; Dengue; Epstein–Barr virus infection; Hepatitis A, B, C, D, and E; HIV infection; Human herpesvirus 6 infection; Lymphocytic choriomeningitis; Parvovirus B19 infection; Picornavirus
Fungal infections	Aspergillosis; Blastomycosis; Candidiasis; Coccidioidomycosis; Cryptococcosis; Histoplasmosis; Mucormycosis; Paracoccidioidomycosis; Pneumocystis pneumonia; Sporotrichosis
Parasitic infections	Amebiasis; Babesiosis; Chagas' disease; Leishmaniasis; Malaria; Strongyloidiasis; Toxocariasis; Toxoplasmosis; Trichinellosis

=== Neoplasm ===
Although most neoplasms can present with fever, malignant lymphoma is by far the most common diagnosis of FUO among neoplasms. In some cases, the fever even precedes lymphadenopathy detectable by physical examination.

Neoplasm cause	Disease name
Hematologic malignancies	Amyloidosis; Immunoblastic T-cell lymphoma; Castleman's disease; Hodgkin's lymphoma; Hypereosinophilic syndrome; Leukemia; Lymphomatoid granulomatosis; Malignant histiocytosis; Multiple myeloma; Myelodysplastic syndrome; Myelofibrosis; Non-Hodgkin's lymphoma; Plasmacytoma; Systemic mastocytosis; Vaso-occlusive crisis in sickle cell disease
Solid tumors	Colon cancer; Renal cell carcinoma; Pancreatic cancer; Hepatoma; Sarcoma; Gall bladder carcinoma; Most solid tumors and metastases can cause fever.
Benign	Atrial myxoma; Renal Angiomyolipoma; Cavernous hemangioma of the liver; Craniopharyngioma; Necrosis of dermoid tumor in Gardner syndrome

=== Noninfectious inflammatory diseases ===
Noninfectious inflammatory diseases	Disease name
Systemic rheumatic and autoimmune diseases	Ankylosing spondylitis; Antiphospholipid syndrome; Autoimmune Hemolytic anemia; Autoimmune Hepatitis; Behçet's disease; Cryoglobulinemia; Dermatomyositis; Felty syndrome; Gout; Mixed connective tissue disease; Polymyositis; Pseudogout; Reactive arthritis; Relapsing polychondritis; Rheumatic fever; Rheumatoid arthritis; Sjögren's syndrome; Systemic lupus erythematosus; Vogt–Koyanagi–Harada disease
Vasculitis	Allergic vasculitis; Eosinophilic granulomatosis with polyangiitis; Giant-cell arteritis/polymyalgia rheumatica; Granulomatosis with polyangiitis; Kawasaki disease; Hypersensitivity vasculitis; Polyarteritis nodosa; Takayasu's arteritis; Urticarial vasculitis
Granulomatous diseases	Granulomatous hepatitis; Sarcoidosis; Midline granuloma
Autoinflammatory syndromes	Adult-onset Still's disease; Blau syndrome; CAPS (Cryopyrin-associated periodic syndrome); Crohn's disease; DIRA (Deficiency of the interleukin-1–receptor antagonist); Erythema multiforme; Erythema nodosum; Hemophagocytic syndrome; Hypersensitivity pneumonitis; Juvenile idiopathic arthritis; PAPA syndrome (pyogenic sterile arthritis, pyoderma gangrenosum, and acne); PFAPA syndrome: periodic fever, adenitis, pharyngitis, aphthae; Recurrent idiopathic Pericarditis; SAPHO syndrome (synovitis, acne, pustulosis, hyperostosis, osteomyelitis); Schnitzler syndrome; Takayasu's arteritis; Weber–Christian disease

=== Miscellaneous conditions ===
- ADEM (acute disseminated encephalomyelitis)
- Adrenal insufficiency
- Aneurysm
- Anomalous thoracic duct
- Aortic dissection
- Aortic-enteral fistula
- Aseptic meningitis (Mollaret's syndrome)
- Atrial myxoma
- Brewer's yeast ingestion
- Caroli disease
- Cholesterol emboli
- Complex partial status epilepticus
- Cyclic neutropenia
- Drug fever
- Erdheim–Chester disease
- Extrinsic allergic alveolitis
- Factitious disease
- Fire-eater's lung
- Fraudulent fever
- Gaucher's disease
- Hamman–Rich syndrome (acute interstitial pneumonia)
- Hashimoto's encephalopathy
- Hematomas
- Hemoglobinopathies
- Hypersensitivity pneumonitis
- Hypertriglyceridemia
- Hypothalamic hypopituitarism
- Idiopathic normal-pressure hydrocephalus
- Inflammatory pseudotumor
- Kikuchi's disease
- Linear IgA dermatosis
- Laennec's cirrhosis
- Mesenteric fibromatosis
- Metal fume fever
- Milk protein allergy
- Myotonic dystrophy
- Nonbacterial osteitis
- Organic dust toxic syndrome
- Panniculitis
- POEMS (polyneuropathy, organomegaly, endocrinopathy, monoclonal protein, skin changes)
- Polymer fume fever
- Post–cardiac injury syndrome
- Postmyocardial infarction syndrome
- Primary biliary cirrhosis
- Primary hyperparathyroidism
- Recurrent pulmonary emboli
- Pyoderma gangrenosum
- Retroperitoneal fibrosis
- Rosai-Dorfman disease
- Sclerosing mesenteritis
- Silicone embolization
- Subacute thyroiditis (de Quervain's)
- Sweet syndrome (acute febrile neutrophilic dermatosis)
- Thrombosis
- Tubulointerstitial nephritis and uveitis syndrome (TINU)
- Tissue infarction/necrosis
- Ulcerative colitis

=== Inherited and metabolic diseases ===
- Adrenal insufficiency
- Cyclic neutropenia
- Deafness, urticaria, and amyloidosis
- Fabry disease
- Familial cold urticaria
- Familial Mediterranean fever
- Hyperimmunoglobulinemia D and periodic fever
- Muckle–Wells syndrome
- Tumor necrosis factor receptor–associated periodic syndrome (familial Hibernian fever)
- Type V Hypertriglyceridemia

=== Thermoregulatory disorders ===
Thermoregulatory disorders	Location
Central	Brain tumor; Cerebrovascular accident; Encephalitis; Hypothalamic dysfunction
Peripheral	Anhidrotic ectodermal dysplasia; Exercise-induced hyperthermia; Hyperthyroidism; Pheochromocytoma

== Diagnosis ==
A comprehensive and meticulous history (i.e. illness of family members, recent visit to the tropics, medication), repeated physical examination (i.e. skin rash, eschar, lymphadenopathy, heart murmur) and myriad laboratory tests (serological, blood culture, immunological) are the cornerstone of finding the cause.

Other investigations may be needed. Ultrasound may show cholelithiasis, echocardiography may be needed in suspected endocarditis and a CT-scan may show infection or malignancy of internal organs. Another technique is Gallium-67 scanning which seems to visualize chronic infections more effectively. Invasive techniques (biopsy and laparotomy for pathological and bacteriological examination) may be required before a definite diagnosis is possible.

Positron emission tomography using radioactively labelled fluorodeoxyglucose (FDG) has been reported to have a sensitivity of 84% and a specificity of 86% for localizing the source of fever of unknown origin.

Despite all this, diagnosis may only be suggested by the therapy chosen. When a patient recovers after discontinuing medication, it likely was drug fever; when antibiotics or antimycotics work, it probably was infection. Empirical therapeutic trials should be used in those patients in whom other techniques have failed.

=== Definition ===
There is no universal agreement with regards to time criteria or other diagnostic criteria to diagnose a fever of unknown origin, and various definitions have been used.

In 1961 Petersdorf and Beeson suggested the following criteria:

- Fever higher than 38.3 °C (101 °F) on several occasions
- Persisting without diagnosis for at least 3 weeks
- At least 1 week's investigation in the hospital

A new definition, which includes the outpatient setting (which reflects current medical practice), is broader, stipulating:

- 3 outpatient visits or
- 3 days in the hospital without elucidation of a cause or
- 1 week of "intelligent and invasive" ambulatory investigation.

Presently, FUO cases are codified in four subclasses.

==== Classic ====
This refers to the original classification by Petersdorf and Beeson. Studies show there are five categories of conditions:

- infections (e.g. abscesses, endocarditis, tuberculosis, and complicated urinary tract infections),
- neoplasms (e.g. lymphomas, leukaemias),
- connective tissue diseases (e.g. temporal arteritis and polymyalgia rheumatica, Still's disease, systemic lupus erythematosus, and rheumatoid arthritis),
- miscellaneous disorders (e.g. alcoholic hepatitis, granulomatous conditions), and
- undiagnosed conditions.

==== Nosocomial ====
Nosocomial FUO refers to pyrexia in patients who have been admitted to the hospital for at least 24 hours. This is commonly related to hospital-associated factors such as surgery, use of a urinary catheter, intravascular devices (i.e., "drip", pulmonary artery catheter), drugs (antibiotic-induced Clostridioides difficile colitis, drug fever), and/or immobilization (decubitus ulcers). Sinusitis in the intensive care unit is associated with nasogastric and orotracheal tubes. Other conditions that should be considered are deep-vein thrombophlebitis, pulmonary embolism, transfusion reactions, acalculous cholecystitis, thyroiditis, alcohol/drug withdrawal, adrenal insufficiency, and pancreatitis.

==== Immune-deficient ====
Immunodeficiency can be seen in patients receiving chemotherapy or in hematologic malignancies. Fever is concomitant with neutropenia (neutrophil <500/uL) or impaired cell-mediated immunity. The lack of immune response masks a potentially dangerous course. Infection is the most common cause.

==== Human immunodeficiency virus (HIV)-associated ====
HIV-infected patients are a subgroup of the immunodeficient FUO, and frequently have fever. The primary phase shows fever since it has a mononucleosis-like illness. In advanced stages of infection, fever is mostly the result of a superimposed infection.

==== Psychogenic fever ====
A specific disorder, reported especially in the Japanese literature, also known under the names functional hyperthermia and psychogenic hyperthermia. Like other functional disorders, it is reported to primarily affect teenagers. Such fever (actually hyperthermia) is reported not to react to NSAIDs, but drugs affecting the central nervous system: powerful anxiolytics (such as diazepam) and beta-blockers, cause quick defervescence.

== Treatment ==
Unless the patient is acutely ill, no therapy should be started before the cause has been found. This is because non-specific therapy is rarely effective and may delay the diagnosis. An exception is made for neutropenic (low white blood cell count) patients or patients who are severely immunocompromised, in which delay could lead to serious complications due to lower immunity. After blood cultures are taken, this condition is aggressively treated with broad-spectrum antibiotics. Antibiotics are adjusted according to the results of the cultures taken.

HIV-infected people with pyrexia and hypoxia will be started on medication for possible Pneumocystis jirovecii infection. Therapy is adjusted after a diagnosis is made.

== Prognosis ==
Since a wide range of conditions are associated with FUO, prognosis depends on the particular cause. If, after six to twelve months, no diagnosis is found, the chances of ever finding a specific cause diminish. Under those circumstances, the prognosis is good.

== See also ==
- Chronic fatigue syndrome
- Encephalitis lethargica
- Idiopathic chronic fatigue
- Idiopathic disease
