= List of side effects of trimethoprim/sulfamethoxazole =

The following list contains adverse effects by incidence of trimethoprim/sulfamethoxazole.

== Common (>1% frequency) ==
- Fever
- Nausea
- Vomiting
- Diarrhea
- Weight loss
- Rash
- Muscle aches
- Joint pain
- Itch
- Aphthous stomatitis and sore mouth
- Hyperkalaemia (high blood potassium)
- Thrombocytopenia (low number of platelets in the blood)

== Infrequently (0.1–1.0% frequency) ==
- Headache
- Jaundice
- Elevated liver transaminases
- Peripheral neuritis
- Drowsiness
- Constipation
- Photosensitivity (light sensitivity)
- Blood dyscrasias (e.g. neutropaenia)

== Rare (<0.1% frequency) ==
- Megaloblastic anaemia
- Methaemoglobinaemia
- Erythema multiforme
- Low blood sugar
- Hepatitis (liver swelling)
- Crystalluria (crystals in the urine)
- Urinary obstruction causing difficulty passing urine
- Lowered mental acuity
- Depression
- Tremor
- Aplastic anaemia
- Haemolytic anaemia
- Hyponatraemia
- Purpura
- Eosinophilia
- Agranulocytosis
- Serum sickness
- Anaphylaxis
- Allergic myocarditis
- Angioedema
- Drug fever
- Periarteritis nodosa
- Hepatic necrosis
- Pancreatitis
- Myelosuppression
- Haemolysis (Note: Breakdown of red blood cells. This side effect most often occurs in people with glucose-6-phosphate dehydrogenase deficiency)
- Stevens–Johnson syndrome (Note: A potentially fatal skin reaction that causes the skin to slough off)
- Drug reaction with eosinophilia and systemic symptoms
- Toxic epidermal necrolysis (Note: Basically a worse form of Stevens–Johnson syndrome)
- Ataxia (Note: Incoordination; most often after IV use in HIV patients)
- Clostridioides difficile colitis
- Aseptic meningitis (Note: Swelling of the membranes surrounding the brain and spinal cord without any obvious infectious cause)
- Pseudomembranous colitis
- Interstitial nephritis
- Fulminant hepatic necrosis
- Hypersensitivity of the respiratory tract
- Sore throat
- Pallor
- Arthralgia
- Severe Acute respiratory distress syndrome

== Unknown frequency ==
- Hallucinations
- Cough
- Glossitis
- Stomatitis
- Fatigue
- Insomnia
- Impaired kidney function
- Pulmonary infiltration (Note: Sign of hypersensitivity)
- Shortness of breath
