= Epidemiology of hepatitis D =

Instance, distribution, and control of Hepatitis D

Worldwide prevalence of HDV among HBV carriers in 2015. Eight genotypes have been identified worldwide by comparative phylogenetic analysis. Genotype 1 is the most frequent and has variable pathogenicity, genotypes 2 and 4 are found in East Asia causing relatively mild disease. Genotype 3 is found in South America in association with severe hepatitis. Genotypes 5, 6, 7, 8 have been found only in Africa.

The epidemiology of hepatitis D occurs worldwide. Although the figures are disputed, a recent systematic review suggests that up to 60 million individuals could be infected. The major victims are the carriers of the hepatitis B surface antigen (HBsAg), who become superinfected by the HDV, and intravenous drug users who are the group at highest risk. The infection usually results in liver damage (hepatitis D); this is most often a chronic and severe hepatitis rapidly conducive to cirrhosis.

== Detection ==
Infection with the HDV is recognized by the finding of the homologous antibody (anti-HD) in serum. Testing for the viral genome (HDV RNA) is limited. In 2013, the 1st World Health Organization International Standard of HDV RNA for nucleic acid amplification techniques (NAT)-based assays was developed.

The underlying HBV infection required to support the HDV is critical to determine the outcome of hepatitis D. In simultaneous coinfection with the HBV, the HDV is rescued by the partner HBV with which it shares the HBsAg coat; in superinfections of HBsAg carriers, it is rescued by the foreign HBV of the carrier which provides the HBsAg coat for the assembly of the HD virion. Coinfections run an acute course; expression of the HDV is accompanied by a weak and transient antibody response and is ephemeral.

In superinfections, the chronic HBV infection and HBsAg state indefinitely sustains the replication of the HDV, resulting in a persistent anti-HD response that can be detected in any random blood sample over time; therefore, carriers of the HBsAg are the only reliable source of epidemiological information. However, HDV infections are highly pathogenic and induce the development of liver cirrhosis in approximately 70% of cases within five to ten years, with the risk of cirrhosis threefold higher in HDV-HBV co-infected than in HBV mono-infected patients. As the probability of finding anti-HD throughout the clinical spectrum of HBV liver disorders increases in parallel with the severity of the liver disease. Patients with advanced HBV liver disease are the most suitable category of HBV carriers to determine the epidemiology and real health burden of HDV.

== By region ==
Low HDV endemicity areas are North America, North Europe and Australia, where it is virtually confined to intravenous drug users and immigrants from infected areas. High endemicity areas remain in the Amazon basin and low income regions of Asia and Africa; outbreaks and fulminant hepatitis D were reported in the past in the Brazilian and Peruvian Amazon, the Central African Republic, the Himalayan foothills and after the year 2000, in Samara (Russia), Greenland and Mongolia.

By controlling HBV infection, the implementation of hepatitis B vaccination in the industrialized world has led to a marked reduction of HDV particularly in Southern Europe and Taiwan. In Italy, HDV diminished among HBV liver disorders from 24.6% in 1983 to 8% in 1997. The residual prevalence of chronic hepatitis D in HBV liver diseases in Western Europe is, as of 2010, between 4.5% and 10%, with immigrants from endemic HDV areas accounting for the larger proportion of cases.

The risk of HDV has not significantly changed in recent years in countries of the world where HBV remains uncontrolled. In Asia up to 2015, the highest prevalences of chronic HDV liver disease were reported in Pakistan, Iran, Tajikistan, and Mongolia; a 2019 study has shown that over 80% of HBsAg cirrhosis cases in Uzbekistan are associated with HDV infection. From partial and scattered information the prevalence in China, and India appears to be low.

In many countries of Africa, the role of hepatitis D is unknown for lack of testing. The highest rates of HDV infection were reported in sub-Saharan Africa, with the finding of anti-HD in over 30% and 50% of the general HBsAg population of Gabon and Cameroon, respectively, and in over 50% of the HBsAg cirrhotics in the Central African Republic (Figure 1). Lesser but consistent antibody rates (from 20% to 43%, with a mean of 24%) were reported in HBsAg liver disease in Tunisia, Mauritania, Senegal, Nigeria, Somalia and upper Egypt. Low prevalences of 2.5% and 12.7% have been reported in HBV disease carriers in Libya and Ethiopia.

Low prevalence of 0 to 8% has also been reported from Morocco, Algeria, Burkina-Faso, Benin, Mali, Sudan, South Africa and Mozambique; however, they were derived from asymptomatic HBsAg-carriers at low risk of HDV, collected at blood banks and in pregnancy clinics.
