= HBcAg =

Capsid protein

Identifiers
- Organism: Hepatitis B virus genotype B2 (isolate Vietnam/9873/1997)
- Symbol: C
- UniProt: Q9QAB9
Search for
- Structures: Swiss-model
- Domains: InterPro

Hepatitis core antigen

Identifiers
- Symbol: Hepatitis_core
- Pfam: PF00906
- InterPro: IPR002006
- CATH: 7abl
- SCOP2: 7abl / SCOPe / SUPFAM
Available protein structures:
- Pfam: structures / ECOD
- PDB: RCSB PDB; PDBe; PDBj
- PDBsum: structure summary

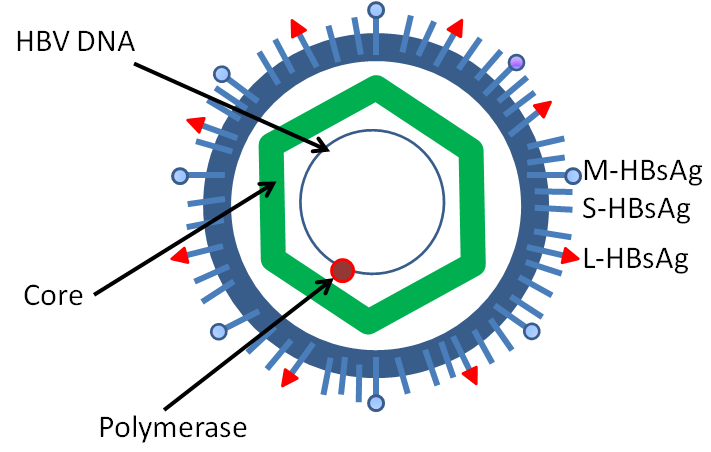
Schematic overview of the hepatitis B virus particle. HBcAg is a constituent of the nucleocapsid core (green hexagon).

The genome organisation of HBV. Some genes overlap. (ORF Core, at bottom left, encodes HBcAg.

HBcAg (core antigen) is a hepatitis B viral protein. It is an indicator of active viral replication; this means the person infected with Hepatitis B can likely transmit the virus on to another person (i.e. the person is infectious).

== Structure and function ==
HBcAg is an antigen that can be found on the surface of the nucleocapsid core (the inner most layer of the hepatitis B virus). While both HBcAg and HBeAg are made from the same open reading frame, HBcAg is not secreted as a monomer. HBcAg is considered "particulate" and it does not circulate in the blood, but recent study show it can be detected in serum by Radioimmunoassay. However, it is readily detected in hepatocytes after biopsy. When both HBcAg and HBeAg proteins are present, it acts as a marker of viral replication.

HBcAg, also called core protein (Cp), is a 21 kDa protein of 183–185 amino acids, depending on the genotype, and is the result of the second start codon in the open reading frame. Once a threshold of HBcAg proteins are translated in the cytoplasm, the viral capsid will spontaneously into a T=3 or T=4 icosahedral capsid. The capsid will usually package the hepatitis B genomic RNA, but some capsids will have cellular RNA or be empty. HBcAg is the target of antiviral compounds, termed capsid assembly modulators (CAMs), that are under clinical investigation for treating chronic hepatitis B.

== Interactions ==
Tapasin can interact with HBcAg18-27 and enhance cytotoxic T-lymphocyte response against HBV.

== See also ==
- HBeAg
- HBsAg
