= Primary gonococcal dermatitis =

- Specialty: Dermatology

Primary gonococcal dermatitis is a rare infection of the skin that occurs after primary inoculation of the skin from an infected focus.

== See also ==
- Gonococcemia
- List of cutaneous conditions
