= HBeAg =

Hepatitis B viral protein

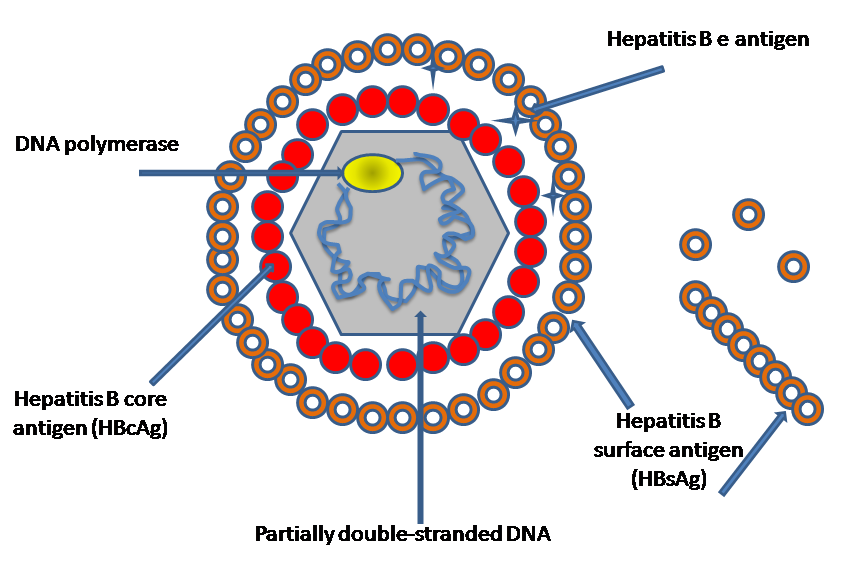
A simplified drawing of the HBV particle and surface antigen. Purple = Lipid Envelope, Red = Nucleocapsid Core (Note: This drawing is slightly misleading in that the nucleocapsid core is a single entity even though it is depicted as a light blue icosahedral line shape and a red ring of circles).

The genome organisation of HBV. The genes overlap. (ORF Core, at bottom left, encodes HBcAg; when translated together with Pre C, it produces soluble HBeAg.)

HBeAg is a hepatitis B viral protein, produced by the HBcAg reading frame. It is an indicator of active viral replication; this means the person infected with Hepatitis B can likely transmit the virus on to another person (i.e. the person is infectious). HBeAg is considered a marker for cccDNA replication.

== Structure ==
HBeAg is an antigen that can be found between the icosahedral nucleocapsid core and the lipid envelope (the outer most layer of the hepatitis b virus). However, HBeAg is considered "nonparticulate" or "secretory". While both HBeAg and HBcAg are made from the same reading frame (multiple protein products can be produced from the same DNA sequence and when the genes "ORF Core" and "Pre C" are translated together, the result is HBeAg), HBeAg is secreted and accumulates in serum as an immunologically distinct soluble antigen. Hence the reason why the presence of both proteins together acts as a marker of viral replication, and why antibodies to these antigens are a marker of declining replication. The presence of HBeAg in the serum of patients can serve as a marker of active replication in chronic hepatitis.

== Function ==
Although the function of HBeAg was not clearly understood, one study demonstrated that it downregulated Toll-like receptor 2 expression on hepatocytes and monocytes leading to a decrease in cytokine expression. HBeAg is dispensable for replication, as mutant viruses with defects in the pre-C region are both infectious and pathogenic.

== See also ==
- HBcAg
- HBsAg
