= Gonococcemia =

- Other names: Disseminated gonococcal infection
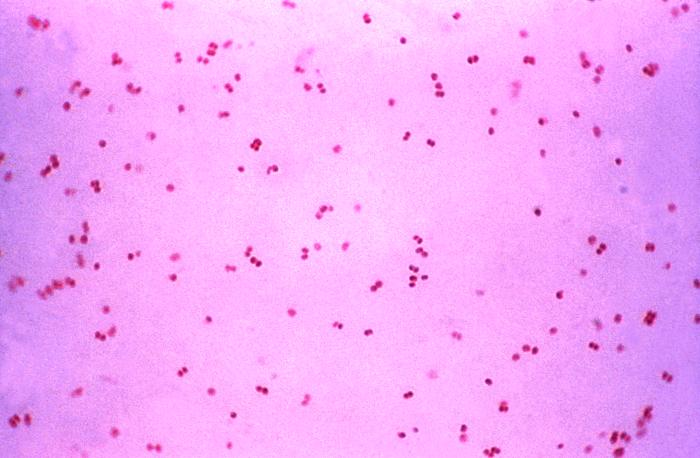
- Neisseria gonorrhoeae
- Specialty: Infectious diseases
- Symptoms: Fever, multijoint pain, hemorrhagic pustules
- Complications: Rarely leads to meningitis and endocarditis
- Causes: Neisseria gonorrhoeae infection
- Risk factors: unprotected sex, female sex
- Diagnostic method: Nucleic Acid Amplification Techniques (NAAT)
- Treatment: Cephalosporins or Fluoroquinolones

Gonococcemia (also known as "Disseminated gonococcal infection") is a rare complication of mucosal Neisseria gonorrhoeae infection, or Gonorrhea, that occurs when the bacteria invade the bloodstream. It is characterized by fever, tender hemorrhagic pustules on the extremities or the trunk, migratory polyarthritis, and tenosynovitis. Patients also commonly experience joint pain (e.g. knee) due to the purulent arthritis. It also rarely leads to endocarditis and meningitis. This condition occurs in 0.5-3% of individuals with gonorrhea, and it usually presents 2–3 weeks after acquiring the infection. Risk factors include female sex and infection with resistant strains of Neisseria gonorrhoeae. This condition is treated with cephalosporin and fluoroquinolone antibiotics.

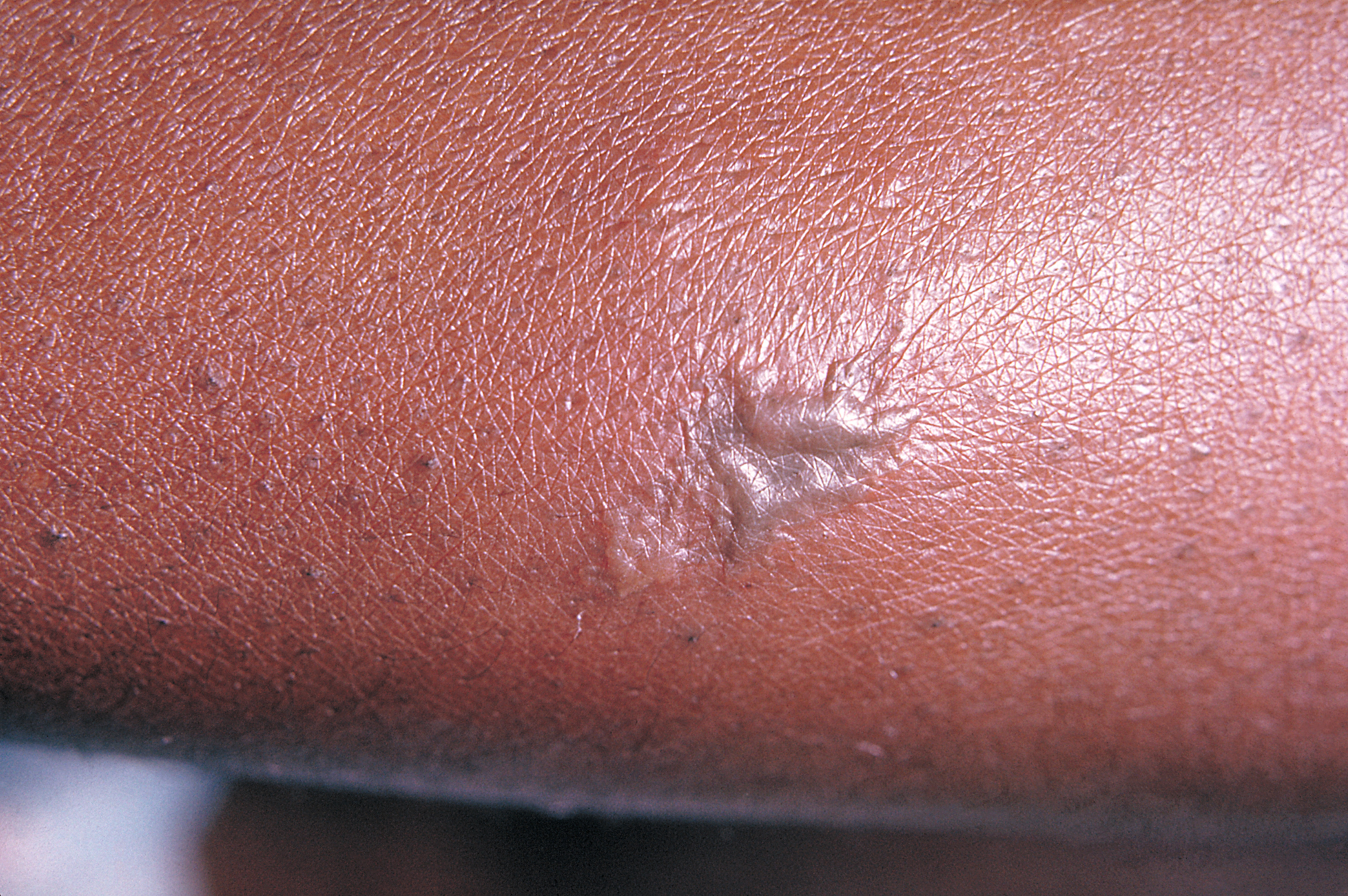
Gonococcemia hemorrhagic pustule

== Epidemiology ==
Neisseria gonorrhoeae is a gram negative diplococcus (also referred to as "Gonococcus") and a pathogenic bacteria. In 2019, there were 616,392 reported cases of gonorrhea in the United States, with an overall increased rate 5.7% from 2018 to 2019. Among those approximately 600,000 cases, it is estimated that 0.5-3% of gonorrheal infections result in gonococcemia. This condition is more common in women, affecting approximately 2.3-3% of women with gonorrhea and 0.4-0.7% of men. This discrepancy is explained by increased incidence of silent gonorrheal infections in females and an increased rate of transmission to females that have sexual intercourse with infected males. Gonococcemia also occurs more frequently in pregnant women, those with recent menstruation, and those with IUDs.

== Risk factors ==
- Infection with certain strains of Neisseria gonorrhoeae
- Prolonged infection
- Female sex (due to asymptomatic infection, and therefore prolonged infection)
- Sexual promiscuity
- Immune system deficiencies
- Infection during menstruation, pregnancy, or in the puerperium period

== Symptoms ==
- Fever
- Migratory arthralgias
- Hemorrhagic pustules
- Tenosynovitis
- Rarely headache, neck stiffness, and visual changes (associated with meningitis)

== Treatment ==
Treatment typically consists of cephalosporin and fluoroquinolone antibiotics. Gonococcemia is typically treated with intravenous or intramuscular cephalosporin antibiotics. Approximately 10-30% of gonorrheal infections present with a co-infection of chlamydia, so it is common to add a one-time dose of oral azithromycin or doxycycline for coverage of Chlamydia trachomatis. Bacterial resistance to antibiotics is increasingly common in Neisseria gonorrhoeae, so it is often advised to check susceptibility of the bacterial culture and then adjust the antibiotic therapy as needed.

== Pathogenesis ==
Neisseria gonorrhoeae is transmitted during sexual contact with an infected individual. The bacteria invade the non-ciliated columnar epithelium of the urogenital tract, oral mucosa, or anal mucosa following exposure. Invasion of the host cells is made possible due to virulence factors such as Pili, LOS, Opa, and others. Similarly, these virulence factors can be used for avoiding the host immune system, which may explain prolonged infection, bacterial resistance, and gonococcemia.

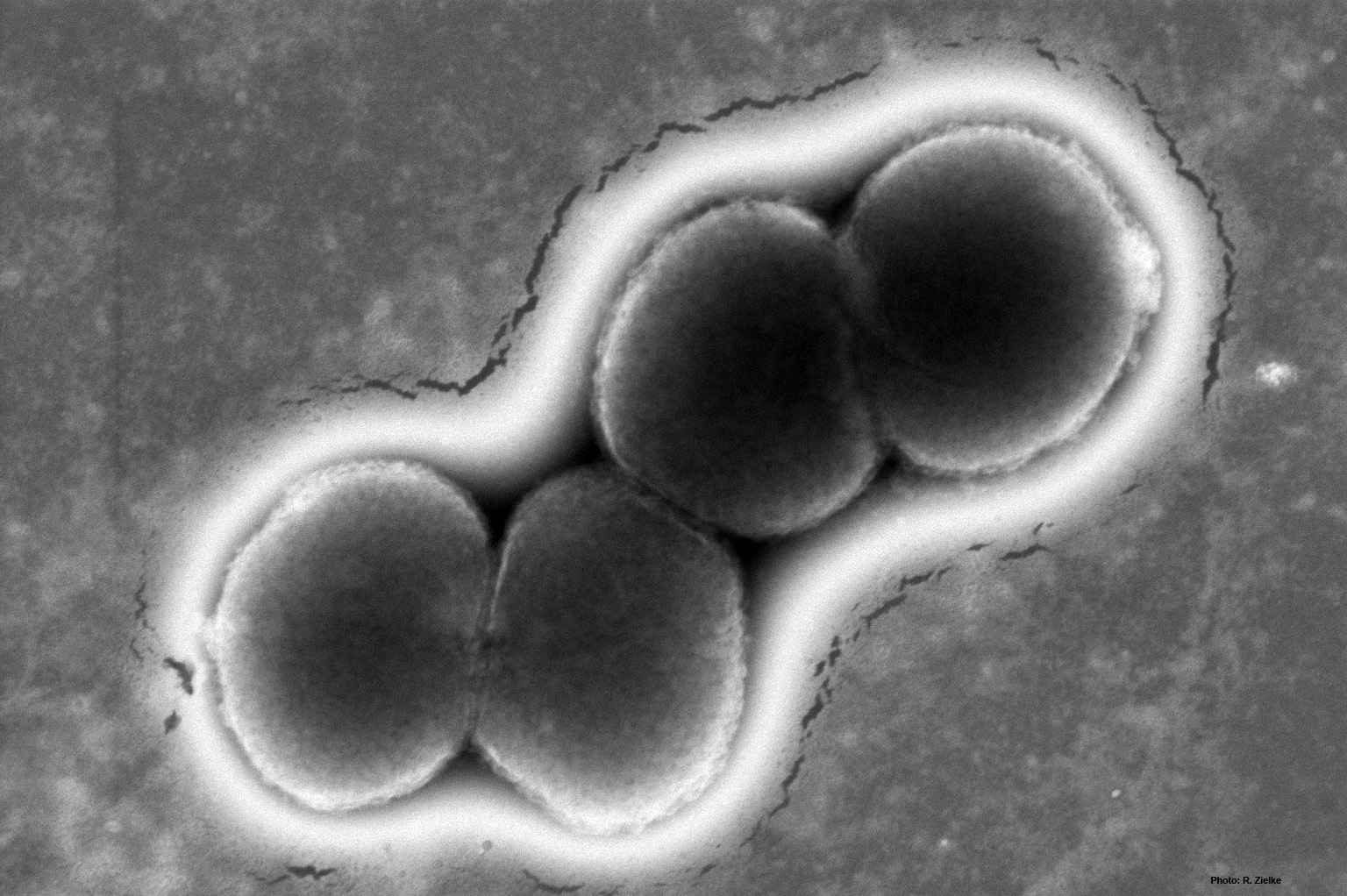
Neisseria gonorrhoeae

== See also ==
- Primary gonococcal dermatitis
- List of cutaneous conditions
