= Idiopathic granulomatous hepatitis =

- Specialty: Hepatology

Idiopathic granulomatous hepatitis is a rare medical condition characterized by granulomas in the liver, recurrent fever, myalgia, and fatigue. The condition is not a true hepatitis, and some experts believe it is a variant of sarcoidosis.

== Signs and symptoms ==
Idiopathic granulomatous hepatitis is marked by granuloma in the liver and recurrent fevers. Fatigue and weight loss are other common symptoms.

== Causes ==
Granulomas in the liver often correspond to a systemic illness that the patient had previously been diagnosed with. Liver granulomas, however, could be a symptom of an unidentified systemic illness or they might not have a discernible underlying cause.

== Diagnosis ==
Establishing the diagnosis can be difficult because it needs to rule out other conditions that can cause hepatic granulomas, like lymphoma, sarcoidosis, drug allergies, and infections by fungi or mycobacteria.

== Treatment ==
Idiopathic granulomatous hepatitis is treated with methotrexate along with additional immunosuppressive medications such as vinblastine, cyclophosphamide, and chlorambucil.

== See also ==
- Hepatitis
- Sarcoidosis
