= Drug-induced hyperthermia =

Symptom

Drug-induced fever is a symptom of an adverse drug reaction wherein the administration of drugs intended to help a patient causes a hypermetabolic state resulting in fever. The drug may interfere with heat dissipation peripherally, increase the rate of metabolism, evoke a cellular or humoral immune response, mimic endogenous pyrogen, or damage tissues.

== Triggers ==
- Directly caused by the drug, e.g. lamotrigine, progesterone, or chemotherapeutics causing tumor necrosis
- Possible side effect of stimulants and entactogens (e.g. cocaine, MDMA, methamphetamine, PMA, 4-MTA)
- As an adverse reaction to drugs, e.g. antibiotics or sulfa drugs.
- After drug discontinuation, e.g. heroin or fentanyl withdrawal
- Neuroleptic malignant syndrome; rare, life-threatening hyperpyrexia caused by antidopaminergic drugs (mostly antipsychotics) e.g. Haloperidol, Chlorpromazine
- Serotonin syndrome; excessive serotonergic activity due usually to combined use of serotonergic drugs (e.g. antidepressants, stimulants, triptans)
- 5HT2A agonists, e.g. psilocybin or LSD
- Malignant hyperthermia

== Clinical treatment ==
The primary treatment strategy is to eliminate or discontinue the offensive agent. Supportive therapy, such as ice packs, may be provided to get the body temperature within physiologic range. In severe cases, when the fever is high enough (generally at or above ~104°F or 40°C), aggressive cooling such as an ice bath and pharmacologic therapy such as benzodiazepines may be deemed appropriate.
