= HBsAg =

Surface antigen of the hepatitis B virus

Large envelope protein

Identifiers
- Organism: Hepatitis B virus genotype B2 (isolate Vietnam/9873/1997)
- Symbol: S
- Orthologs: OMA: entry
- UniProt: Q9QAB7
Search for
- Structures: Swiss-model
- Domains: InterPro

The genome organisation of HBV; the genes overlap. ORF S, in green, encodes HBsAg.

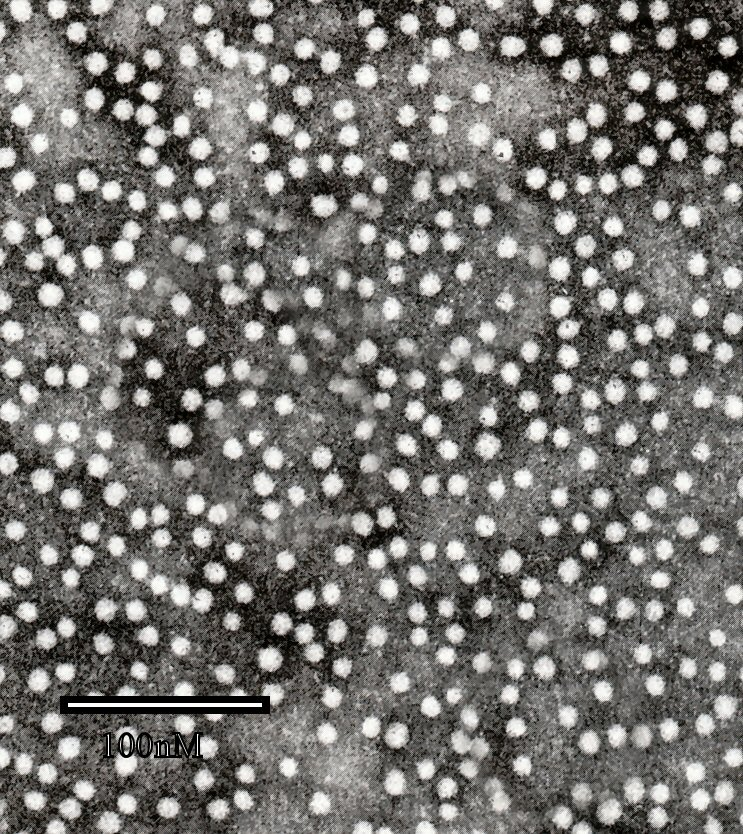
HBsAg under a transmission electron microscope: the protein self assembles into virus-like particles

HBsAg (also known as the Australia antigen) is the surface antigen of the hepatitis B virus (HBV). Its presence in blood indicates existing hepatitis B infection.

== Structure and function ==
The viral envelope of an enveloped virus has different surface proteins from the rest of the virus which act as antigens. These antigens are recognized by antibody proteins that bind specifically to one of these surface proteins.

The full-length HBsAg is called the L (for "large") form. It consists of a preS loop, a first transmembrane helix (TM1), a cytosolic loop (CYL), another TM helix (TM2), an antigenic loop (AGL), followed by two TM helices (TM3 and TM4). The preS loop can either be on the outside (lumen), or be located in the cytosol with the TM1 helix not actually penetrating the membrane. The M ("medium") form has a truncated preS; the part of preS1 unique to L is called preS1, while the part shared by L and M is called preS2. preS2 is always located in the lumen. The S ("small") form has no preS2.

HBsAg forms the shell of the virus. Furthermore, it contains parts that are recognized by the cellular receptor of the virus NTCP in preS1, which causes the virus to tightly bind to the cell. How the virus convinces the cell to take the virus in after binding via endocytosis is unknown. It also serves to release the contents of the virion into the cell through membrane fusion. The part responsible for fusion is also located in preS1.

HBsAg self-assembles into viral shells even when no contents are present. Such an empty shell is called a virus-like particle or a small spherical subviral particle.

== Immunoassay ==
Today, these antigen-proteins can be genetically manufactured (e.g. transgene E. coli) to produce material for a simple antigen test, which detects the presence of HBV.

It is present in the sera of patients with viral hepatitis B (with or without clinical symptoms). Patients who developed antibodies against HBsAg (anti-HBsAg seroconversion) are usually considered non-infectious. HBsAg detection by immunoassay is used in blood screening, to establish a diagnosis of hepatitis B infection in the clinical setting (in combination with other disease markers) and to monitor antiviral treatment.

In histopathology, the presence of HBsAg is more commonly demonstrated by the use of the Shikata orcein technique, which uses a natural dye to bind to the antigen in infected liver cells.

Positive HBsAg tests can be due to recent vaccination against Hepatitis B virus but this positivity is unlikely to persist beyond 14 days post-vaccination.

== Applications ==
HBsAg made through recombinant DNA is used to make the hepatitis B vaccine. It has a very good efficacy of about 95%, with protection lasting for more than 30 years, even after the anti-HbsAg antigen titers have fallen.

The RTS,S also makes use of HBsAg. It is a mixture of a version of malaria surface antigen grafted to HBsAg (RTS) and ordinary HBsAg (S), both made through recombinant DNA. Much like ordinary HBsAg, these two are able to assemble into virus-like particles that are soluble in water.

== History ==
It is commonly referred to as the Australia Antigen. This is because it was first isolated by the American research physician and Nobel Prize winner Baruch S. Blumberg in the serum of an Australian Aboriginal person. It was discovered to be part of the virus that caused serum hepatitis by virologist Alfred Prince in 1968.

Heptavax, a "first-generation" hepatitis B vaccine in the 1980s, was made from HBsAg extracted from the blood plasma of hepatitis patients. More modern vaccines are made from recombinant HBsAg grown in yeast.

== See also ==
- HBcAg
- HBeAg
