= Mass media in Georgia (country) =

The mass media in Georgia refers to mass media outlets based in the Republic of Georgia. Television, magazines, and newspapers are all operated by both state-owned and for-profit corporations which depend on advertising, subscription, and other sales-related revenues. The Constitution of Georgia guarantees freedom of speech. Georgia is the only country in its immediate neighborhood where the press is not deemed unfree. As a country in transition, the Georgian media system is under transformation.

The media environment of Georgia remains the freest and most diverse in the South Caucasus, despite the long-term politicisation and polarisation affecting the sector. The political struggle for control over the public broadcaster left it without a direction in 2014.

A large percentage of Georgian households have a television, and most have at least one radio. Most of Georgia's media companies are headquartered in its capital and largest city, Tbilisi.

== History ==
Independent media blossomed in Georgia in the post-Soviet period, with 600 newspapers registered between 1990 and 2000, starting with 7 Days and Resonance. The TV channel Rustavi 2, established in 1994, brought editorial freedom on air. Media soon become one of the most trusted institutions in the country (with a 73% approval rating it was only second to the Georgian Orthodox Church in 2003).

Government pressures on the free media increased together with their criticism of corruption and abuse of power. Rustavi 2 was twice threatened with closure, the prominent TV anchor Giorgi Sanaia was killed, and several other journalists were attacked.

The media had a big role in the coverage of the rigged Georgian parliamentary election, 2003, leading up to the Rose Revolution. The numbers released by the Central Election Commission were openly contradicted by exit polls and parallel vote tabulations reported by the Georgian media. After the Rose Revolution a new legislation was introduced that guaranteed free speech and decriminalised defamation.

With the coming to power of Mikhail Saakashvili, the government took on the news agenda. Two TV stations and several newspapers closed down, while other channels were taken over by government-friendly private business groups. Journalists increasingly resorted to self-censorship. Media/government relations worsened in the following years, with the 2007 closure of the critical Imedi TV station among political protests, as well as the 2008 Russo-Georgian War. In 2009 press freedom was among the top political issues in Georgia, with a battle between government and opposition for control over the public service broadcaster and the denunciation of pro-governmental media outlets, which also included various forms of intimidation of journalists (e.g. pickets and "corridors of shame"). Saakashvili later pledged to move toward a “more open and unbiased” media landscape and to upheld the independence of the public service broadcaster.

== Legislative framework ==
The media legislation of Georgia is deemed progressive and liberal. The Constitution of Georgia protects press freedom. It states at Article 19:

Every individual has the right to freedom of speech, thought, conscience, religion and belief; The persecution of a person on the account of his/her speech, thought, religion or belief as well as the compulsion to express his/her opinion about them shall be impermissible; These rights may not be restricted unless the exercise of these rights infringes upon the rights of other individuals.

And at Article 24:

Everyone has the right to freely receive and impart information, to express and impart his/her opinion orally, in writing or by in any other means. Mass media shall be free. Censorship shall be impermissible; Neither the state nor particular individuals shall have the right to monopolise mass media or means of dissemination of information;

The exercise of the rights enumerated in the first and second paragraphs of the present Article may be restricted by law on such conditions which are necessary in a democratic society in the interests of ensuring state security, territorial integrity or public safety, for preventing of crime, for the protection of the right and dignity of others, for prevention of the disclosure of the information acknowledged as confidential or for ensuring the independence and impartiality of justice.

The Law on Freedom of Speech and Expression (2004) recognises and protects the right to freedom of expression as an inherent and supreme human value and forbids censorship. It guarantees the rights of Georgia residents as well as media institutions (newspapers, publishers, and the Public Broadcaster). It includes sources confidentiality and court guarantees. Anyone can apply to a court “to prevent a violation of a right guaranteed and protected under this law” or “to eradicate the consequences of the violation” (Article 6). The burden of proof lies with the initiator of the restriction and not with the involved journalist.

Defamation in Georgia is decriminalised since 2004 - the first country in the Caucasus region to do so. The law foresees that public figures should accept much more criticism than ordinary citizen, given their responsibilities towards citizens and the influence on society of their decision.

The 1999, Civil Code includes a Freedom of Information Section that guarantees access (immediate, or within a 10-days deadline) to public information that is not a state secret. Implementation remains problematic. The post-2012 governments have pledged to improve access, in line with the Open Government Partnership. Public agencies are now required to establish websites, publish information online, and accept electronic requests for information. Most of them complied by 2014. Challenges remain in unifying and expanding the open data initiatives.

The Law on Broadcasting regulates the allocation of licenses for radio frequencies and set the legal basis for the Georgian Public Broadcaster. 2013 amendments universalised the "must carry/must offer" principle, preventing cable operators from politically suppressing certain TV channels from their offers. This was positively received by the OSCE RFoM.

The Georgian Tax Code exempts from VAT the printing and distribution costs of the print press.

Other relevant laws for press and media freedom include the Law on State Secret and Law on Copyright and Adjacent Rights.

=== Status and self-regulation of journalists ===
In December 2009, the journalists gather by the Civil Society Institute adopted a Georgian Charter of Journalism Ethics and established the Georgian Charter of Journalism Ethics Association.

In 2009, the Georgian National Communications Commission adopted the Broadcasters’ Code of Conduct, as required by the 2004 Law on Broadcasting, which defines it as “a normative act, passed by the Commission … determining the rules of conduct for license holders.”

The Georgian Public Broadcaster has a progressive Code of Conduct, as well as an ombudsman to receive viewers complaints.

The Media Council was established in 2005 by nine national and 11 regional media organisations, three NGOs and individual journalists. It was tasked with monitoring and enforcing the Journalists Code of Ethics as well as reviewing complaints. However, it failed to establish cross-media ethical standards. Founding organisations soon refused to pay their membership fees.

An alternative Press Council was founded in 2005 by four leading newspapers which had denounced the Media Council launch as an attempt at censorship. The Press Council is equally dysfunctional.

In 2010, the OSCE RFoM intervened to recall Georgian journalists of the professional duties they have committed themselves to, after a controversial fake report by Imedi TV, condemning "irresponsible journalism and the impact it may have on media freedom and security". Imedi's report, claiming that President Saakashvili had been assassinated and Russian troops were close to Tbilisi, was reported to have spread panic, while carrying no warning of its fictitious nature (see 2010 Georgian news report hoax). The report had been swiftly condemned by the GNCC. According to Mijatovic, "Broadcasters and other media outlets ought to behave responsibly and not mislead the public by spreading false information. This is of particular importance in Georgia and other countries whose societies may be more prone to alarm due to recent armed conflicts."

== Media outlets ==
Georgia has many print outlets, but with very limited circulation numbers.

=== Print media ===
Newspapers in Georgia provide pluralist views to the public, have loyal readerships and are the main source of information for around one fourth of the citizens.

In 2010, there were 502 registered newspapers in Georgia: 376 national ones (registered with the Department of Statistics in Tbilisi) and 126 regional ones. Of these, only 28 Tbilisi-based and 61 peripheral ones had regular publications. Kviris Palitra (კვირის პალიტრა) and Rezonansi (Resonance) are the most well-reputed. Other press outlets include the dailies Alia, Akhali Taoba, Sakartvelos Respublika, Mtavari Gazeti, Versia and Asaval-Dasavali (with different professional standards) as well as the best-seller weekly Kviris Palitra. Most newspapers are based in the capital and Tbilisi-based news outlets are also distributed in the peripheral regions.

Regional print media outlets are mainly weeklies, including Batumi-based Batumelebi, the Kutaisi-based Akhali Gazeti, PS, Guria News, Kakhetis Khma, Spektri and Samkhretis Karibche. Minority-language newspapers include Russian-language ones (Svobodnaya Gruziya, Golovinski Prospect, Argumenti i Facti), as well as the bilingual Komsomolskaya Pravda v Gruzii and Ajaria. Armenian-language newspapers include Javakhk, Arshadius and the bilingual Samkhretis Karibche. Azerbaijani-language newspapers include Gurjistan, Hairat, and the bimonthly bilingual Timer published by the Civil Development Agency.

English-language magazines The Messenger, The Financial, Georgia Today, The Georgian Times, and Georgian Business Week cater mostly to the international community in Tbilisi.

Cheap and glossy magazines are on the rise. They offer a mix of gossip, entertainment and politics. Titles include Sarke, Tbiliselebi, Gza and Raitingi, as well localised versions of international outlets (such as Cosmopolitan Georgia) as well as Tskheli Shokoladi and Liberal (by M-Publishing).

Circulation data are not released by publishers. Average circulations were at 4,500-5,000 for dailies in Tbilisi, 2,000 for the regional press, and 25,000-30,000 for weeklies.

=== Radio broadcasting ===
- Radio broadcast stations: AM 7, FM 12, shortwave 4 (1998)
- Radios: 3.02 million (1997)

Tbilisi radio stations include Imedi Radio (105.9FM), Fortuna, and Radio 105. Imedi mainly concentrates on news and commentary, but broadcasts pop music as well, particularly at night-time.

In 2010, there were 27 radio stations in Tbilisi and 9 in the other parts of the country. Leading Tbilisi-based stations include Fortuna, Fortuna Plus, Imedi (focusing on news and commentary), Utsnobi, Avto Radio, Ar Daidardo and Green Wave, with niche audiences and a mixed programming of news, talk shows, music and entertainment. All but Utsnobi air throughout the country. Abkhazetis Khma broadcasts in Georgian and Russian in the breakaway region of Abkhazia.

Regional stations include Dzveli Kalaki, Hereti, Harmonia and Atinati (gathered together as the Georgian Radio Network), competing with Tbilisi-based radios for local audiences. In 2010 there were two community-based radios, in Marneuli and Nori, that broadcast three hours per day via loudspeaker.

The Georgian Public Broadcaster (GPB) operates two radio channels: Sakartvelos Radio – Pirveli Radio and Radio Ori – Kartuli Radio. They lag behind in listeners' rankings. The GPB also operated the international channel Radio Georgia, which closed down in 2005.

Foreign radios that are re-broadcast in Georgia include Radio France International, America's National Public Radio and BBC World on Radio GIPA, and Russia's Europa Plus. Radio Free Europe/Radio Liberty airs four hours a day of locally produced news and analysis.

Most radio stations are also available online. 17% of Georgians say they get information mainly from the radio.

=== Television broadcasting ===
Television in Georgia was introduced in 1956, when Georgia was still known as the Georgian SSR. Almost all Georgians (95%) got their political news from television in 2010. The country hosts 40 TV stations, of which nine are in Tbilisi and 31 in the regions. Four stations have national coverage (Georgian Public Broadcaster Channel I, Imedi, Rustavi 2 and Ajara); three of them are Tbilisi-based. Viewers prefer Rustavi 2, followed by Imedi TV and GPB's First Channel. Other major television broadcasters 2008 include Second Channel, Maestro, Mze TV, Mzera Television, TV 9, Kavkasia TV. Two new stations were launched in 2006: TV Sakartvelo, financed by the Ministry of Defence to cover the defence sector, and Alania, broadcasting in Russian language to the breakaway South Ossetia region.

- The Georgian Public Broadcaster is publicly funded (it received a yearly allocation of around 0.12% of GDP from the state budget), and broadcasts on free-to-air television and radio. It is required by law to “provide accurate and up-to-date information that is free from political and commercial bias” and “to address the needs and interests of the larger Georgian society through diversity of programs and viewpoints”. The state TV was turned in a public service broadcaster in 2004 following the adoption of the Law on Broadcasting. GPB was later criticised for becoming a governmental mouthpiece and got ensnared in a battle for control between government and opposition. The GPB board was enlarged from 9 to 15 members in December 2009 to provide more space for opposition and civil society. Its First Channel remained connoted as biased in favour of the pre-2012 United National Movement government. GPB underwent spoil-system in 2013, with most UNM-linked managers being fired. In 2013 the GPB underwent a serious leadership crisis, with a director dismissed and several board positions left vacant. Its governance structure was changed following amendments to the Broadcasting Law, reducing the size of the board and aiming at more competitive and politically-neutral appointments. Multiple selection rounds in 2013 and 2014 did not manage to fill all vacant seats. The OSCE RFoM expressed disappointment.
  - In 2013 Ajara TV was removed from the control of the local authorities in the region and transformed in a public service broadcaster. The OSCE RFoM denounced the election of the Board of Trustees of Ajara TV and Radio, calling it "an unfortunate decision, which challenges the rule of law and among other things undermines the integrity of the public broadcaster"
- The Rustavi 2 network produced significant coverage of the 2003 Rose Revolution. The station currently reaches around 84% of the country's population, as well as Europe, the European part of Russia and the Middle East via satellite. The station was frequently critical of the Eduard Shevardnadze government, and reported on corruption and human rights abuses. In 2001 a security police raid on Rustavi 2 resulted in mass street demonstrations against governments pressure, after which President Shevardnadze fired his entire cabinet.
- In 2008 and 2009 the Tbilisi-based stations Kavkasia TV and Maestro improved their viewership by giving voice to the parliamentary opposition. The Georgian National Communications Commission (GNCC) sanctioned Maestro as in breach of its "music and entertainment"-type license and refused to afford it a "general programming" license, resulting in an 8-months controversy ending only after intervention by the Parliament's Speaker.
- Imedi TV was launched by the Georgian tycoon Badri Patarkatsishvili, and was highly critical of the Saakashvili governments. In November 2008 the government accused the station to foster violence and sent police to put it off air. Police forces destroyed equipment and “excessively ill-treated” journalists. The station re-opened one year later, after Patarkatsishvili's death and being taken over by a pro-government businessman - also adopting a much more benevolent editorial line.

Georgia lacks transparency in private ownership of TV stations, including for the main Rustavi 2 and Imedi stations. In 2010, 90% of Imedi was owned by the Georgian Media Holding, a subsidiary of Rakeen Investment, and managed by President Saakashvili's former minister of economy. Balance and neutrality are missing from news coverage, with stations divided between pro-government and pro-opposition camps. The state of ownership transparency was improved by the 2011 amendments to the Law on Broadcasting, requiring the full disclosure of ownership structures, and banning ownership by offshore companies. Concentration concerns remain unanswered. Ownership changes in 2012-2015 have reduced polarisation among TV channels.

The advertising market in Georgia is not large enough to sustain all TV stations, which rely on public or private subsidies. Rustavi 2, the most viewed channel, leads in advertising revenues; its airtime is distributed by Media House, which also acts as intermediary for three other Tbilisi-based stations. 2013 amendments to the Broadcasting Law require broadcasters to disclose funding sources to the GNCC.

Advertisers in Georgia have traditionally favoured pro-governmental media and shunned the print media. In 2014 the Finance Ministry was criticised for requiring the TV audience measurement company TVMR GE to disclose the location of monitored households.

A law in October 2014 required private broadcasters to allot 90 seconds of airtime every three hours for "social advertising" (public service announcements), although the provision was criticised as vague and costly, and giving too wide control powers to the GBCC.

Digital switchover in Georgia was planned for the 2012-2015 period. The government subsidized digital receivers for less-capable households.

Independent TV production studios in Georgia include TBC TV, Prime Time, Formula Creativi and Utsnobi Studio, providing films and programmes for both public and private channels. The Studios “Reporter” and “Monitor” produced controversial documentaries on the crimes after the Rose Revolution and the misuse of funds at GPB. Former Rustavi-2 employees founded the GNS studio, specialised in producing investigative documentaries, aired on Maestro.

- Television broadcast stations: 25 (plus repeaters) (2011)
- Televisions: 2.57 million (1997)

=== Cinema ===
The cinema industry started in Georgia in 1908. In 100 years, over 800 films, 600 documentaries and 300 animated movies were produced in the country. The full catalogue is available online at Geocinema.ge and was showcased in a special exhibition at Cannes Film Festival in 2008 in the occasion of the centenary.

The late Soviet period was the most prolific for the Georgian cinema. The political and economic turmoil of the 1990s instead led to the collapse of film production. Soviet Georgia's main studio, Gruziya Film, was inherited by J.S.C Georgian Film, the main private film production studio in the country. All previously state-owned film studios have been privatised. Independent movie studios in Georgia include Sanguko Films, Film Studio – Remka, Georgian Film and Vars - studio.

The government has lately tried to attract foreign investments in the film industry by promoting the country as "one of the most film-friendly and competitive production destinations in the world". A law on state promotion of Georgian national cinematography was adopted in 2000, establishing the state-funded Georgian National Film Center agency under the Ministry of Culture to facilitate industry development, subsidising domestic productions and promoting Georgian movies abroad.

=== Telecommunications ===
- Calling code: +995
- Main lines: 830,222 lines in use (2009)
- Mobile cellular: 3.1 million lines (2009)

The TLC sector in Georgia comprised 6.88% of the GDP, mostly due to mobile telephony (63%), followed by fixed telephony (29%) and broadcasting (7.7%).

The fixed telephony, internet and IP television in Georgia is mainly operated by the Silknet, New Net and MagtiCom controlled 90% of the market in 2018. By the end of 2008, there were 618,000 fixed telephone users in Georgia. In urban areas there are 20 telephones per 100 people, and in rural areas there are four telephones per 100 people.

There are three cellular telephone networks: MagtiCom LTD, Silknet JSC, and Mobitel Georgia (Russian Beeline group). The cellular network market counts more than 3,000,000 registered customers in total (the commercially active number is not known). Coverage extends to over 98% of the populated territory as of 2010;

Fiber-optic lines connect the major cities and Georgia and Bulgaria are connected with fiber-optic line between Poti and Varna (Bulgaria).

=== Internet ===
Internet penetration in Georgia long remained concentrated in the main towns, due to high prices and lack of landline infrastructure. Around 49% of Georgians had internet access in 2014. However, by 2023 the number of internet users increased to 89% according to National Statistics Office of Georgia.

Internet is free of government control. Temporary restrictions have been imposed during the 2008 Russo-Georgian war. The Georgian blogging community has been growing (Caucasusreports.ge), together with internet forums (Forum.ge) and social media (Facebook.com)

Internet-based news media became common in the 2000s. Civil Georgia (civil.ge), operated by the United Nations Association of Georgia, was launched in 2001 as a multi-language (Georgian, English, Russian) fact-based online newspaper. Media.ge (Internews, 2005), Presa.ge and Internet.ge are other news aggregators. In 2019, Caucasian Journal was launched in Tbilisi as the first media targeting the South Caucasian region.

Internet-based news media include the following:

- Agenda.ge
- Alia
- Batumelebi
- Business Media Georgia
- BusinessPressNews
- Civil Georgia
- Ekho Kavkaza
- Eurasianet
- InterPressNews
- Kvira
- Netgazeti
- Multimedia
- OC Media
- Publika
- Tabula

== Media organisations ==
=== Media agencies ===
News agencies in Georgia include InterPressNews, Prime News, GBC and Pirveli. They are all private, profit-making societies based in Tbilisi. RegInfo is an agency based in the Kvemo Kartli region. International agencies present in the country include Agence France Presse, Reuters Bureau, Bloomberg, Itar Tass, Associated Press.

=== Trade unions ===
Georgia lacks an active professional association of the media workers. The Georgian Federation of Journalists, heir of the Soviet-era Union of Journalists, is currently dysfunctional. Donor-funded trade associations were set up in 2005–2007, including the Georgian Regional Media Association and the Georgian Association of Regional Television Broadcasters, but their influence remains limited. They lobby against intimidation and violence against journalists, rejection of public information requests and in favour of legislative changes to serve interests of the regional media.

=== Regulatory authorities ===
The Georgian National Communications Commission (GNCC), established in 2000 under the 1990 Law on Telecommunications and Post, is and independent government agency tasked with regulating the TLC sector and issuing licenses for radio frequencies through competitive tenders. It then monitors the licensees' activities and works as an arbitrator for litigations between license holders and consumers. The GNCC also prevents the formation of monopolies and preserves an equal and fair competitive environment, facilitating the introduction of new technologies. The GNCC has own resources thanks to licensing and regulation fees. Its members are appointed by the President of Georgia for a 6-years term.

The GNCC has been criticised for lack of independence and of transparency in its operations and licensing procedures, particularly in relation with traditional media. Pro-governmental channels have been allowed to operate without licenses, and the process of licensing has been seen as politically influenced. A new chair of the GNCC was elected in 2014, after the previous two chairs had been criticised for conflict of interest. The OSCE RFoM called again in 2014 for "full autonomy" to be granted to the GNCC "to ensure the efficiency and impartiality of its work", recalling its importance in the wake of the digitalisation process in order to enhance pluralism in the broadcasting section.

In 2011, the GNCC renewed the broadcast licenses, after a 3-year delay. In 2012 the Georgian Constitutional Court ruled that TV stations would not need a license to broadcast via cable, but only via radio frequencies and satellite.

== Censorship and media freedom ==
In the 2016 and 2017, World Press Freedom Index by Reporters Without Borders Georgia was in the 64th place. In the 2015 Georgia came in 69th place out of 180 countries, between Mauritius (68th) and Hong Kong (70th). Previously this was 84th place in 2014 and 100th place in 2013. They stated:

After electoral turmoil in 2012 and 2013, Georgia has begun to reap the fruits of the reforms undertaken in the recent years, even if political rivalry has sometimes hampered their implementation. Transparency about media ownership has improved, although news outlets are politically polarized and still not very independent.

Legal cases are rarely brought against journalists in Georgia, but legislation often remains unevenly implemented.

=== Attacks and threats against journalists ===
Violence and harassment against journalists have been reported in Georgia, particularly during electoral periods. Although they are in decline, journalists still face intimidations.

- During the 2007 Georgian demonstrations, the riot police attacked the headquarters of Imedi channel, leading it to off the airing of demonstrations. The OSCE RFoM denounced the operation of the authorities and called for accountability.
- Journalists killed during the 2008 Russo-Georgian war include Grigol Chikhladze, head of Alania TV, Alexander Klimchuk, head of the Caucasus Images Agency and correspondent for Itar-Tass, both killed on 10 August 2008 in Tskhinvali, and Stan Storimans, cameraman with the Dutch RTL Nieuws who died in Gori on 12 August. Injured journalists included at least five Russians, two Georgians, two Turkish, a Dutch, an Israeli, and an American.
- The 2008, Russo-Georgian war led to mutual blockage of Georgian and Russian Internet sites and television channels. The blockage subsidies after the end of the conflict, while TV channels remained imbued of hostile and biased information on both sides. Safe access for journalists could not be assured for longtime in the conflict areas, and access remained selectively restricted, with Georgian and foreign journalists unable to access the Russian-occupied regions.
- A hand grenade was thrown at the Maestro TV in May 2009 during the broadcast of the "Camera 5" live political talk show, hosted by Georgi Gachechiladze, brother of the opposition politician Levan Gachechiladze. The attack caused injuries.
- At least 10 Georgian and foreign journalists were assaulted by policemen while covering the break up of an opposition rally in Tbilisi on the night of 25 to 26 May 2011, despite being clearly identified as press member. Some of them were questioned and had their press card or equipment confiscated or damaged. The OSCE RFoM protested with the Georgian Foreign Ministry.
- Incidents against journalists were reported on 26 June and 12 July 2012 in the Shida Qartli region in central Georgia.
- In July 2014 Erosi Kitsmarishvil, a founder of Rustavi 2, was murdered by gunshot in his homeplace. An investigation is still ongoing.
- A journalist from Asaval-Dasaval newspaper was twice assaulted in October 2014.
- In January 2016, three journalists from the Georgian TV and the news website Tabula were attacked while at a restaurant in Tbilisi, allegedly for their stance towards the Georgian Orthodox Church.

=== Political interferences ===
Interferences from both the majority and the opposition camps in the media field have happened repeatedly in Georgia, leading to a growing polarisation and politicisation. Polarisation in the television sector has recently declined, with broadcasters focusing more on competition on contents. The 2014 local elections were covered rather unbiasedly, compared to the 2012 and 2013 national votes. Yet, challenges persist. Governmental officials have been reported as undermining legal protections of the media through hostile rhetoric.

- During the Sandro Girgvliani murder case the media businessman Badri Patarkatsishvili, owner of Imedi Media Holding, stated that the Georgian authorities were mounting pressure on his station and other businesses after it had broadcast details of the scandal. "It is no secret that Imedi television was the first one which reported the circumstances of Sandro Girgvliani’s murder...this alone became a reason for the authorities’ dissatisfaction, which triggered the financial authorities to actively launch a probe into my businesses and my companies so [as] to force me to mount pressure against [my] journalists..and facilitate the creation of a favorable image of the authorities," Badri Patarkatsishvili went on to say that he would never yield to pressure from the authorities.
- On 6 July 2006, Eka Khoperia, an anchor with Rustavi 2, announced during her live program that she was resigning, after refusing to follow instructions from the authorities.
- In November 2007, Imedi TV's license was suspended for three months following charges of anti-state activities; its premises were raided and closed down by the authoritie. The license was reinstated on 4 December, after international intervention and mediation by the OSCE RFoM and the EU Special Representative for the South Caucasus, and the government announced they planned to compensate damages.
- In 2010, Eutelsat was suspected with terminating the broadcasting of the Georgian public TV station Pervyi Kakvazkyi after signing a contract with the Russian Gazprom-linked operator Intersputnik.
- On 27 March 2012, the editor of Forbes Georgia, Revaz Sakevarishvili, resigned because of alleged censorship, claiming that "there has been quite a serious attempt to put pressure and establish censorship." According to Sakevarishvili, the owners of the Media Partners, the holding company which owns publishing rights to Forbes Georgia had actively tried to alter materials about opposition parties or prevent their publication altogether.
- Prime minister Irakli Garibashvili, as his predecessors, has accused several media, including Rustavi 2 and Maestro, of biased coverage.
- In 2013, the Georgian Public Broadcaster underwent a serious leadership crisis, with a director dismissed and several board positions left vacant. Its governance structure was changed following amendments to the Broadcasting Law, reducing the size of the board and aiming at more competitive and politically-neutral appointments. Multiple selection rounds in 2013 and 2014 did not manage to fill all vacant seats.
- In December 2014, several journalists resigned from Maestro in protest against the firing of a popular anchorwoman Nino Zhizhilashvili, denouncing pressures from pro-governmental figures.
- In February 2016, the Georgian rapper Giorgi Gachechiladze "Utsnobi" (brother of the former politician Levan Gachechiladze) became the main shareholder of Maestro TV. The channel got ensnared in an ownership dispute among other shareholders, which triggered concerns from six NGOs, including Transparency International Georgia, about the editorial independence of the channel in the wake of the Georgian parliamentary election, 2016, as "the case of Maestro intensifies [fears] of civil society that the government wants to establish control over media prior to elections". Maestro TV journalists, backed by the Independent Association of Georgian Journalists (IAGJ), protested against the nomination of a new director for the channel.

=== Ownership battle for Rustavi 2 ===
In August 2015, the Tbilisi City Court ordered an asset freeze against the main private TV channel, Rustavi 2, pending a civil lawsuit by the businessman Kibar Khalvashi (a supporter of the Georgian Dream party), aiming to recover shares he claims to have been forced to surrender in 2006. Rustavi-2 had changed ownership around 20 times between 2004 and 2012, according to Transparency International Georgia, often in controversial deals with businessmen close to the former President Saakashvili. The viability of the channel, which is currently the only major TV channel close to the opposition United National Movement, was jeopardised by the judicial decision, which was deemed disproportionate and at risk of negatively affecting media pluralism in Georgia - besides the job security of Rustavi-2's journalists - as well as at risk of politicisation. The Independent Association of Georgian Journalists (IAGJ) and the European Journalists' Federation have expressed concern about the appointment of a new pro-governmental management at Rustavi-2, asking the Tbilisi Court "not to interfere on Rustavi 2’s editorial independence." The OSCE Representative on Freedom of the Media equally called upon Georgian Courts not to encroach on editorial independence. Dunja Mijatović intervened again in 2017 after a Supreme Court decision on the ownership dispute.

The Georgian Dream government has clarified that it sees the case purely as an ownership dispute and that it will take no part in it, leaving its closure in the hands of the judiciary. The case of Rustavi-2 caused street protests.

=== Internet censorship and surveillance ===
Listed as engaged in selective Internet filtering in the political and conflict/security areas and as no evidence of filtering in the social and Internet tools areas by the OpenNet Initiative (ONI) in November 2010.

Access to Internet content in Georgia is largely unrestricted as the legal constitutional framework, developed after the 2003 Rose Revolution, established a series of provisions that should, in theory, curtail any attempts by the state to censor the Internet. At the same time, these legal instruments have not been sufficient to prevent limited filtering on corporate and educational networks. Georgia’s dependence on international connectivity makes it vulnerable to upstream filtering, evident in the March 2008 blocking of YouTube by Türk Telekom.

The Georgian National Communications Commission in general does not much to fight online copyright infringement, and some specific decisions are thought to have been taken for political reasons. One example is the blocking in 2011 of websites hosting a film about the Georgian-Russian war.

According to the 2014 Freedom of the Net report by Freedom House, restrictions on online content were decreasing, there were no indications of online censorship or blocking and no cases of activists or journalists questioned or arrested for online activities.

=== Self-censorship ===
In a presentation at the 2nd South Caucasus Media Conference free-lance journalist Eka Kvesitadze said that Georgian "journalists are on friendly terms with high ranking officials and have actually made a practice of taking instructions from them on how to cover various events".

According to most Media Sustainability Index panelists Georgian journalists practice self-censorship in order to avoid offending political or religious powers (the Georgian Orthodox Church).

Some journalists and professionals practice self-censorship on the internet for professional ethics. Some civil servants do the same because of pressure from their bosses.

On 27 March 2012, Revaz Sakevarishvili resigned denouncing interference in his work as editor-in-chief of Forbes Georgia by Gagik Eghizaryan, one of the two co-owners of the magazine publishing house. According to Sakevarishvili the publisher wanted to avoid offending politician Gela Bezhuashvili.

== Media ownership ==
=== Transparency ===
Transparency of media ownership refers to the public availability of accurate, comprehensive and up-to-date information about media ownership structures. A legal regime guaranteeing transparency of media ownership makes possible for the public as well as for media authorities to find out who effectively owns, controls and influences the media as well as media influence on political parties or state bodies.

In 2011, following a campaign run by Georgian civil society, with the support of local and international organisations and donors, the law regulating ownership transparency for broadcast media was amended with the aim to introduce stricter transparency requirements as well as financial transparency rules and ban offshore companies from owning broadcast licenses or authorization.

Before 2011, the lack of media ownership transparency had been one of the major concern in the media system in Georgia. Indeed, the leading national broadcasters, including the public service ones, were widely perceived as agent of the government disseminating biased pro-governmental information and their actual owners were concealed behind offshore companies. However, media-specific rules on media ownership transparency only exist for the broadcast sector, thus data on print and online media should be found through provisions regulating corporate law, making the process more complicated

As a result of the reform of the Law on Broadcasting occurred in 2011, broadcast media, which includes around 60 media outlets, are obliged to disclose data on their ownership structure. This includes information on the size of shareholdings, beneficial owners and people with indirect interests and control. Making public information on offshore companies was one of the central amendment to the law. Information must be reported to the media authority, namely the Georgian National communications Council (GNCC) and directly to the public.

A 2014 report by Transparency International on transparency of media ownership of broadcast, print and online media outlets in Georgia found out that, thanks to the 2011 reform, the situation has improved and media ownership is now largely transparent. The amended law contributed to make public the connections of some of the country’s leading media outlets with the government and other political groups and controlled through opaque shell entities. One of the persisting challenges is the lack of available information about weather media owners hold positions in governmental bodies; indeed, there is not a unique list of government officials and only senior officials are obliged to make a public declaration on their assets.

=== Concentration and pluralism ===
Legal framework

Art. 60 of Georgian Law on Broadcasting states that:

A person may possess independently or with an interdependent person no more than one terrestrial broadcasting license for television and one for radio in any one service area.

— Art. 60, Georgian Law on Broadcasting

Service areas are currently ten and are the subject of article 40 of the same statute:

According to the decision of GNCC, the territory of Georgia is divided into terrestrial broadcasting service areas.

— Art. 40, Georgian Law on Broadcasting

Market concentration for telecom operators is regulated by the Law on Electronic Communications. Specialised terrestrial TV and radio stations, all cable and satellite broadcasters, print and online media are free from these restrictions. However, in 2015 digital terrestrial TV broadcasting was introduced: according to the panelist of IREX Media Sustainability Index the switch run smoothly without political interference. Since transparency regulations do not apply to online media it is more difficult to identify owners and potential concentrations.

National media

According to a 2014 report by Transparency International Georgia, "the level of concentration of ownership in the media sector [was] not a reason for concern". In 2015 Freedom House noted that "strong ties remain between media outlets and political parties or interests". In 2016 IREX similarly noted that in previous years, "Georgian mainstream news outlets have re-affiliated along various political lines". Also, there are cases in which sources of funding are unclear.

Georgian Public Broadcaster operates First Channel and Second Channel. Its independence has been questioned and in 2012 Prime Minister Bidzina Ivanishvili considered and then retracted a merger with TV9, a commercial station launched by his wife.

Rustavi 2 is the most successful private television broadcasting company in Georgia and accounts for almost half of all revenues in the broadcasting sector, but the only other channel owned by the company is the entertainment station Comedy Channel, so there should be no concentration problems. However Rustavi, 2 was subject to an ownership battle, involving courts. In 2016 IREX claimed that real owners were dubious.

The only large multimedia holding is Palitra, owning Radio Palitra, Palitra TV, Kvilis Palitra newspaper, Interpress News, Biblusi book stores, etc.

Regional media

According to a 2014 report by Transparency International Georgia, the "level of market concentration in the regions [was] not a matter of concern".

"There are 32 TV stations in Georgia that hold terrestrial broadcasting licenses, out of which 21 stations broadcast in different regions of Georgia (excluding Tbilisi.) Additionally, 24 companies hold licenses for radio broadcasting in different regions of Georgia."

Online media

A 2015 report by Transparency International Georgia noticed several interconnections between different online media. In particular some anti-Western media outlets are associated with Eurasia Institute and Eurasian Choice organisations and have Russian connections. Also, some online media outlets are directly connected with the Cabinet. Some opposition website were founded after United National Movement lost the parliamentary election of 2012, together with non-governmental and civil society organisations that owns them and most of them have direct connections with the members of the UNM.
