= Telecommunications in Georgia (country) =

Telecommunications in Georgia include radio, television, fixed and mobile telephones, and the Internet.

== Radio and television ==
- Radio broadcast stations: AM 7, FM 12, shortwave 4 (1998). There are 35 FM stations in the country, as of 2021.
- Radios: 3.02 million (1997).
- Television broadcast stations: 25 (plus repeaters) (2011).
- Televisions: 2.57 million (1997).

== Cellular Networks ==
- Calling code: +995
- Mobile Phone subscribers: 4,955,272 million lines (April 2021)

There are three cellular telephone networks: MagtiCom LTD, Silknet JSC, and Cellfie Mobile (Formerly known as Beeline). The cellular network market counts more than 4,955,272 active customers in total.

Coverage extends to over 98% of the populated territory as of 2010; In urban areas there are 20 telephones per 100 people and in rural areas 4 telephones per 100 people.

In 2020, the Georgian National Communications Commission announced its plans to introduce Mobile virtual network operators in 2021. The first MVNO in the country, Hallo, launched in Q4 of 2022 and it is based on Silknet's infrastructure. Tele 1 (also marketed as Tele One) is going to launch soon. It is not yet clear which operator's infrastructure the company will use. Tele 1 has already started operating in the country partially, but its services (video and audio calling) are available only through their apps as of now (VoIP).

The Georgian National Communications Commission has announced an auction for the 5G spectrum. It will be held in August 2023 and most of the lots come with a requirement for MNOs to start talks with MVNOs, which means they will not be able to keep their infrastructure closed off if they want to buy licenses for specific 5G frequencies.

== Fixed Telephony, Internet and IP Television ==
- Internet service providers: at least 10 ISPs.
- Fixed Internet Subscribers: 977,6 thousand lines (April 2021)
- Internet Protocol television Subscribers: 551 thousand lines (April 2021)
- Fixed Phone Subscribers: 830,222 lines in use (2009), 366,250 lines in use (April 2021)
- Top-level domain: .ge

The fixed telephony, internet and IP television in Georgia is mainly operated by MAGTICOM, Silknet and New Net, all of which controlled 90% of the market in 2018. By the end of 2008, there were 618,000 fixed telephone users in Georgia. In urban areas there are 20 telephones per 100 people, and in rural areas there are four telephones per 100 people.

Additionally, Datahouse Global LLC, Geonet LLC, Inexphone LLC, and Myphone LLC are providing VoIP-based fixed telephony services over the country.

Fiber-optic lines connect the major cities and Georgia and Bulgaria are connected with fiber-optic line between Poti and Varna (Bulgaria). The home internet provider industry in Georgia is heavily monopolized by 2 major competitors: Silknet and MAGTICOM. There are other smaller, more obscure providers as well, but these two are the most popular and have the biggest nationwide coverage. Both companies offer TV and mobile packages that can be combined with home internet as well.

=== Internet censorship and surveillance ===
Listed as engaged in selective Internet filtering in the political and conflict/security areas and as no evidence of filtering in the social and Internet tools areas by the OpenNet Initiative (ONI) in November 2010.

Access to Internet content in Georgia is largely unrestricted as the legal constitutional framework, developed after the 2003 Rose Revolution, established a series of provisions that should, in theory, curtail any attempts by the state to censor the Internet. At the same time, these legal instruments have not been sufficient to prevent limited filtering on corporate and educational networks. Georgia's dependence on international connectivity makes it vulnerable to upstream filtering, evident in the March 2008 blocking of YouTube by Türk Telekom.

On March 14, 2016, access to YouTube was restricted nationwide. This restriction of access was to presumably prevent Georgian citizens from accessing a video which threatened a number of journalists and opposition figures with the exposure of covertly recorded video tapes of sex acts. YouTube access went down throughout Georgia until the threatening video was removed from the internet.

== See also ==
- Georgian National Communications Commission
