= Telephone numbers in Georgia (country) =

- Location of Georgia (dark green) Abkhazia and South Ossetia (light green)
- Country: Georgia
- Continent: Europe
- Numbering plan type: closed
- Country code: +995
- International access: 00
- Long-distance: 0

Telephone numbers in Georgia consist of 9 digits and follow a closed numbering plan in which the initial 2 or 3 digits indicate the service or area code (in case of geographic numbers) and the remaining 7 or 6 digits identify the subscriber.

== Numbering plan ==
The current dialling plan has been in force since 4 June 2011, when there was a wide-ranging reform. Specifically, area codes were updated to start with 2 or 3, mobile numbers came to begin with the digit 5, and some geographical numbers were padded with an additional digit 2 or 3 immediately after the area code to make a total of 9 digits. The current plan is as follows:

Prefix/Code	Description
1XX	Used for emergency/special numbers and international calls prefix. E.g., 111 - Fire Service
2XX	Reserved
3X(X)	Area codes of in eastern Georgia. E.g., 32 - Tbilisi, 341 - Rustavi
4X(X)	Area codes in western Georgia. E.g., 431 - Kutaisi
5XX	Prefixes of mobile operators. E.g., 595 - MagtiCom
6XX	Reserved
7XX	Non-geographical services. E.g., 790 - MagtiCom, fixed mobile operator
8XX	Toll free and shared-cost numbers. E.g., 800
9XX	Premium-cost numbers

=== Geographic numbering ===
Since 1 March 2011, area codes have changed and the first digit came to indicate the respective part of the country: numbers start with 3 for eastern Georgia and with 4 for western Georgia. The current area codes are as follows:

Code	Area	Code	Area	Code	Area
32 (33)	Tbilisi (reserved)	366	Adigeni	431	Kutaisi
341	Rustavi	367	Borjomi	432	Vani
342	Akhalgori	368	Khashuri	433	Kharagauli
344	Tskhinvali	369	Kareli	434	Baghdati
345	Stepantsminda	370	Gori	435	Sachkhere
346	Dusheti	371	Kaspi	436	Tsqaltubo
347	Java	372	Gardabani	437	Lentekhi
348	Tianeti	373	Mtskheta	439	Ambrolauri
349	Akhmeta	374	Tighvi	442	Sukhumi
350	Telavi	410	Mestia	443	Gagra
351	Sagarejo	411	Samtredia	444	Gudauta
352	Kvareli	412	Abasha	445	Ochamchire
353	Gurjaani	413	Senaki	446	Tkvarcheli
354	Lagodekhi	414	Khobi	447	Gali
355	Signagi	415	Zugdidi	448	Gulripshi
356	Dedoplistsqaro	416	Tsalenjikha	472	Tsageri
357	Marneuli	417	Chkhorotsqu	473	Oni
358	Bolnisi	418	Martvili	479	Chiatura
359	Tetritsqaro	419	Chokhatauri	491	Terjola
360	Dmanisi	422	Batumi	492	Zestaponi
361	Ninotsminda	423	Khulo	493	Poti
362	Akhalkalaki	424	Shuakhevi	494	Lanchkhuti
363	Tsalka	425	Keda	495	Khoni
364	Aspindza	426	Kobuleti	496	Ozurgeti
365	Akhaltsikhe	427	Khelvachauri	497	Tkibuli

=== Mobile telephony numbering ===
Georgian mobile operators receive their number allocations in blocks of 1 million numbers, hence the first three digits usually indicate the original mobile network providing the number. However, since mobile number portability was introduced in Georgia on 15 February 2011, the links are no longer certain.

Telephone prefixes originally distributed to mobile operators are listed below.

On 20 June 2011, the digit 5 was added to the prefixes for mobile operators. For example, prefix 77 was changed to 577.

Code	Operator	Code	Operator
511	MagtiCom	577	Silknet _{Geocell}
514	Silknet _{Geocell}	578	Silknet _{S1}
551	MagtiCom _{Bani}	579	Cellfie
555	Silknet _{Geocell}	591	MagtiCom
557	Silknet _{Geocell}	592	Cellfie
558	Silknet _{Geocell}	593	Silknet _{Geocell}
559	Datahouse Global	595	MagtiCom
568	Cellfie	596	MagtiCom _{Bali}
570	Silknet _{S1}	597	Cellfie
571	Cellfie	598	MagtiCom _{Bali}
574	Cellfie	599	MagtiCom

In addition, the mobile operator Aquafon operating in Abkhazia and using the Russian (+7) 9409 code can also be reached using the Georgian code (+995) 544.

=== Fixed wireless numbering ===
On 27 June 2011, prefixes for fixed wireless telephony changed: digit 7 have been added to the prefix. For example, prefix 90 have been changed to 790.

Prefix	Operator
790	MagtiFix (MagtiCom)
791	Silknet

== Dialling ==
=== Calling within Georgia ===
Geographical numbers

0 + Destination area code [2 or 3 digits] + Subscriber's phone number [6 or 7 digits]

For example, to call a landline phone in Tbilisi:

2xx xxxx (within Tbilisi)
0 - 32 - 2xx xxxx (within Georgia)
Originating country's international code + 995 - 32 - 2xx xxxx (from abroad)

00 + 995 + 32 + 2xx xxxx (for example, from EU or Switzerland)

(there are no subscriber numbers that start with other digit than 2 as of September 24, 2025)

Mobile numbers

0 + Mobile network code (3 digits) + Subscriber's number [6 digits]

To dial a mobile number, for example a Magticom number:

595 + xxx xxx (from mobile network)
0 + 595 + xxx xxx (within Georgia, from landlines)
Originating country's international code + 995 (code for Georgia) - 595 - xxx xxx (from abroad)

00 + 995 + 595 + xxx xxx (for example, from EU or Switzerland)

=== Calling abroad ===
The dial plan is as follows: Optional carrier code – 00 - Destination country code - Subscriber number

The following carrier codes are in use for international communication:

Code	Operator	Code	Operator
1007	MagtiCom	1053	Sky Service
1010	MagtiCom	1054	Lagi
1011	SystemNet	1057	NewCom
1012	SystemNet	1060	GeoNet
1013	MacroCom	1061	Silknet
1015	SakTelComPlus	1062	Silknet
1016	Silknet	1063	Black Sea Telecom
1017	SystemNet	1064	Central Communication Company of Georgia
1018	Global Erty	1065	New Net
1019	Akhtel	1067	GeoTel
1027	CallCenter	1069	Service
1040	IntelPhone	1072	TelMax
1041	Silknet	1075	Wi-MAX Georgia
1050	MagtiCom	1076	Silknet
1052	Alex Development Georgia	1094	Warid Telecom Georgia

For example, to call Geneva (Switzerland) using default international code and pre-selected operator code of Silknet:

00 - 41 - 22 - xxx xx xx
1016 - 00 - 41 - 22 - xxx xx xx

== Emergency and short numbers ==
Service	Number
General emergency	112
Property Security Police	125
