= 2010 Georgian news report hoax =

Hoax aired on Georgian television

A fake news report aired by Georgian television station Imedi TV on 13 March 2010 reported on the breakdown of Parliament and the deaths of several government officials, culminating in an invasion of Georgia by Russia. The hoax was intended as a hypothetical pseudo-documentary. The broadcast's close resemblance to genuine news programming caused widespread panic among Georgians who believed the events depicted were real, and it was linked to the deaths of at least three people.

The hoax drew widespread criticism from the opposition, the Georgian media, and the public, as well as many international commentators and officials. Then-President Mikheil Saakashvili, whom Imedi TV supported, was accused of involvement in the hoax. It has been considered one of the most shocking hoaxes of all time.

== The broadcast ==
Special Report was a weekly programme broadcast on Imedi TV on Saturdays at 8:30 pm. On 13 March 2010, Imedi moved its timeslot forward to 7:59 pm, the timeslot allocated to Chronicle, Imedi TV's news programme. Chronicle, which normally airs at 8:00 pm, is a major source of information for Imedi TV viewers.

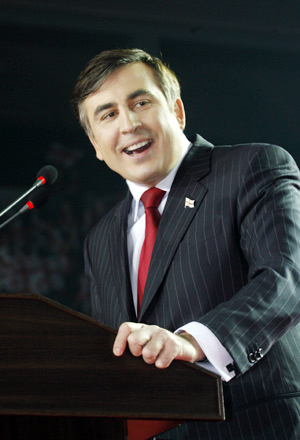
President Mikheil Saakashvili was reported to have been assassinated in the broadcast.

The fake news broadcast, which was presented as a Chronicle breaking news report and heavily used footage from the Russo-Georgian War, began by accusing the Georgian opposition of organising protests in Tbilisi over alleged fraud in the Tbilisi city elections, which were scheduled for 30 May. During the protests, unknown gunmen opened fire on the protestors, killing several people; the opposition promptly pleaded for the international community to assist in ousting the "Saakashvili tyranny". Following the protest in Tbilisi, an ambush in the South Ossetian capital of Tskhinvali killed President of South Ossetia Eduard Kokoity; the Russian government announced that it held proof of Georgian security services' involvement in Kokoity's assassination, which Russia considered a terrorist attack. Allegedly pro-Russian opposition politicians, led by Nino Burdzhanadze and Zurab Nogaideli, travelled to Tskhinvali and accused Saakashvili of killing Kokoity. After the assassination, Russian Army troops were mobilized and placed on high alert; in response, the Georgian Army was mobilized and took defensive positions around Tbilisi with heavy artillery. A "people's government" with Burdzhanadze at the helm declared the government of Saakashvili "illegal". Other Georgian opposition politicians who were held up as collaborators with the Russians included Zurab Dzidziguri, Kakha Kukava, Koba Davitashvili, Levan Gachechiladze and Giorgi Khaindrava.

Russian president Dmitry Medvedev was then shown, with a Georgian voiceover, allegedly saying "Since the Saakashvili regime began open terrorism against South Ossetia, this international criminal must be stopped. I have ordered a military operation, and call on the Georgian people not to resist the troops that bring them freedom." The broadcast then showed Russian tanks, which were based in the Akhalgori region of South Ossetia, entering the Georgian capital, with several Georgian battalions reported to have defected and sided with the people's government. Saakashvili was pronounced as having possibly been assassinated, which was allegedly announced by the Movement for Fair Georgia, the political party headed by former Georgian prime minister and current opposition politician Zurab Nogaideli. However, other reports claimed Saakashvili was alive in a hidden location and still in command. The broadcast stated that the West stood by and issued only "halfhearted protests". A speech said to have been given by President Saakashvili was shown, where he stated that Russia wanted to become an empire, and instructed all eligible Georgians to join the military. Meanwhile, Russian planes were reported to have bombed targets and infrastructure across Georgia, and Georgian volunteers were reported to be engaged in combat in Mtskheta. The report also described the scenario of Polish president Lech Kaczyński's flight to Tbilisi being destroyed, killing him.

Though the beginning and end of the program noted the events of the broadcast were a fictional "simulation", the rest of the broadcast did not. Two hours after the initial broadcast, Imedi aired a follow-up broadcast apologising for spreading panic.

=== Effects ===
The broadcast sparked widespread panic across Georgia, as many Georgians did not see the disclaimer at the beginning of the broadcast and assumed that they were watching live events. Thousands of calls to emergency services were made, citizens hurried to withdraw cash from automatic teller machines, Georgian mobile phone networks crashed, and those living in Tbilisi and near the border with South Ossetia prepared to flee. Some units of the Georgian Army took up defensive positions after hearing of the alleged invasion. Russian news agency Interfax began reporting on the invasion of Georgia and the assassination of Saakashvili, before Georgian government employee David Cracknell sent a two-word text message to foreign journalists reading "Not true".

The deaths of three people were indirectly caused by the hoax and the ensuing panic. Gaioz Odishelidze, a 50-year-old man from Aragvispiri in the Dusheti district, suffered a fatal heart attack whilst watching the program. According to his son, Odishelidze cried out "What the hell's going on?", before grabbing his chest and collapsing. An ambulance rushed to the scene, but paramedics were unable to revive him. Vano Nasaridze, a 75-year-old resident of Tbilisi and a refugee from Sukhumi, suffered a stroke whilst watching the broadcast. Nasaridze's family rushed him to a hospital on 14 March, where he underwent surgery, but died several days later. Nasaridze's family announced their intention to sue Imedi, insisting that the program was responsible for his death. A woman whose son was serving in the Georgian Army died of a heart attack while watching the program.

== Domestic reaction ==
The opposition in Georgia condemned the programme, which has been compared to the 1938 The War of the Worlds radio broadcast, and accused Saakashvili of involvement.

Nino Burdzhanadze, the leader of Democratic Movement-United Georgia opposition party, stated her belief that Saakashvili ordered the programme aired to increase anti-Russian sentiment and to tarnish the Georgian opposition. Burdzhanadze's party also announced that it would file a lawsuit against Imedi.

Former Georgian president Eduard Shevardnadze condemned the programme and said that it was intimidation by the Georgian government of its own people. Shevardnadze also stated that the programme proved then-Russian president Dmitry Medvedev correct in his decision not to hold discussions with Saakashvili. Catholicos-Patriarch Ilia II of Georgia condemned the programme, calling it an insult to Georgia's people and army.

In a poll run by Kviris Palitra, 63% of the 406 respondents believe that Saakashvili was involved in the preparation of the fake report, whilst 8.7% believe the President was uninvolved, with 28.3% indicating they were unsure.

=== Georgian journalist reactions ===
The Imedi broadcast was condemned by many Georgian journalists who took part in protests at the Imedi TV building. Giorgi Udzilauri, a journalist with the Akhali Taoba newspaper, noted that the programme demonstrated that propaganda has a large influence in Georgia, and went on to say that the programme was a test of public reaction towards the Georgian government's "next violence and military adventure", and that it appears the Government still holds such plans. Udzilauri also called Imedi a "propaganda trumpet" of the government, and stated his belief that those responsible should be taken to court, as creating panic is a crime against the State. Luba Eliashvili stated their belief that Imedi should be charged, however, new laws in Georgia do not provide significant penalties. Eliashvili also stated that a positive outcome of the report is that people have lost their trust in Imedi and the "Mischists" forever. Gia Iakobashvili, the Editor-in-Chief of presa.ge, stated their belief that all journalists should protest against Imedi, and that journalists should not participate in any Imedia programming. Giorgi Mamatsashvili, a journalist with the Asaval-Dasavali newspaper, regarded the programme as a staged show, and after hearing the alleged telephone conversation between Tsamalashvili and Arveladze, stated his belief that the programme had the intent of creating panic and to implement the Government's ideology. Mamatsashvili also said that "Imedi has become a house of prostitution. This Government's ideology is to fight against the Patriarch and destroy the Church."

The Council of the Charter of Journalistic Ethics in Georgia had a meeting on 25 March 2010, in which they discussed journalistic ethics in the Georgian media. Special Report anchor Natia Koberidze was due to attend the meeting but later withdrew. Koberidze stated that she was ready to attend the Council meeting, but due to its public format, decided to withdraw as the meeting could be used as a mean to attack her. Eter Turadze, the Council head, stated at the meeting that it was not being held to punish anyone, although sanctions could be considered if the Council felt that journalistic ethical norms were breached. Turadze also said that the stated aim of the meeting was to call upon journalists to act according to ethical norms. As a result of Koberidze's non-attendance at the meeting, the Council sent her 16 questions via email, which among other things asked her who was responsible for the fake news report being broadcast with visible warnings that it was only a simulation, and whether she had been put under any pressure. Koberidze replied to the questionnaire by saying that she did not violate the Charter, as warnings were given to viewers at the beginning of the programme that it was a simulation. She also stated she was not aware who was responsible for the absence of visible warnings during the programme.

=== Imedi response ===
Giorgi Arveladze, the General Director of Imedi TV, stated that the purpose of the program was to demonstrate to Georgians the external threats that they were faced with, saying, "The really unpleasant thing about yesterday's report—and I want everyone to understand this well—is that this report is as close to reality as possible, to what may really happen, and to what Georgia's enemies keep in mind". Arveladze apologised for the panic caused by the broadcast, but defended the report, and dismissed calls for him to resign. Whilst Arveladze refused to be drawn into questions on whether the broadcast breached the code of conduct for broadcasters, the Georgian National Communications Commission and the Young Lawyers' Association of Georgia said that Imedi had violated the code with its broadcast. The Imedi chief was also forced to defend against allegations that top officials in the Georgian government, including Saakashvili, were informed about the programme before it went to air. After a finding by the GNMC that the broadcast violated the broadcaster's code of conduct, the broadcaster was directed to make a public apology.

=== Government response ===
On 14 March 2010, speaking to residents in the Bolnisi region, Saakashvili appeared to defend the broadcast, and stated "(i)t was indeed a very unpleasant program, but the most unpleasant thing is that it is extremely close to what can happen and to what Georgia's enemy has conceived". The only part of the fake report that Saakashvili specifically objected to was the part which said that some of the Georgian Army had joined forces with the Russians, as it is, according to Saakashvili, an insult to the military. However, during the Mukhrovani Mutiny Saakashvili called the same soldiers traitors and accused them of working for Russia. Military expert Giorgi Melitauri accused those behind the mutiny of being behind the writing of the programme. On 15 March 2010, a written statement appeared on the Georgian president's website, in which, aside from accusing Russia of having aggressive plans against Georgia, he called for higher journalistic ethical standards to prevent such incidents in the future.

Georgian prime minister Nika Gilauri speaking in Brussels rejected the notion that the government exercised any control over Imedi, citing the station's private ownership; despite this, the station was widely perceived as being under the control of the government in Tbilisi at the time.

=== Taped telephone recordings ===
On 15 March 2010, an audio recording alleged to be a telephone conversation between Arveladze and his deputy Eka Tsamalashvili was released by Forum.ge; because of Arveladze's close ties to Saakashvili this raised suspicions that the Saakashvili had been involved in the broadcast. In the recording, a woman, allegedly Tsamalashvili, says that airing the report as if it were genuine news would be a violation of the Georgian Law on Broadcasting, and stated that a notification should be carried on screen telling viewers of the fake report that it was a simulation. A man, allegedly Arveladze, responds to the suggestion by saying that he had spoken to "Misha" — a nickname for Saakashvili — the day previous, and after being asked by Saakashvili whether the programme would be put to air as a regular Chronicle programme, he told him that it would. The man continued to say that he told Saakashvili that viewers would be told at the beginning of the broadcast that the programme was a simulation, but Saakashvili said not to do so, ostensibly because it would affect the effect of the programme. The man goes on to say that the general plot outline had been provided to Ghia Nodia and Zurab Davitashvili, both former members of Saakashvili's government. After being asked about the plot outline, both Nodia and Davitashvili confirmed that they had received it from the television network prior to the broadcast.

Arveladze denied the conversation took place and accused the Russian special services of fabricating the tape by stitching together phrases from different conversations to produce the recording. Tsamalashvili called the recording "absurd and a lie", and dismissed suggestions that she had received directions from government officials whilst working at Imedi. She also suggested involvement of Russian special services in the alleged fabrication. Independent analyst Irakli Sesiashvili stated that the recording was "very close" to authentic, and stated his belief that the voices on the recording matched the alleged speakers manner of speaking. Sesiashvili also stated that it is impossible to "maintain natural intonation and idiolect in a fabricated tape".

On 16 March 2010, an audio recording of an alleged telephone conversation between Saakashvili and the Georgian Minister of Culture Nika Rurua was anonymously posted online, and was partially aired by Rustavi 2 in its 6 pm news bulletin. In the recording, a man, allegedly Rurua calling from Paris, asks whether the panic caused by the program had "calmed down". In response, another man, allegedly Saakashvili, says that the panic only lasted five minutes, and that Imedi should have placed a caption below the screen to advise viewers it was a simulation. The second man then says that the programme had predicted quite accurately the "Russian scenario", and that he had spoken to Arveladze and told this to him. Rurua accused the Russian Federal Security Service of fabricating the recording.

Irakli Sesiashvili suggested that Georgian Interior Minister Vano Merabishvili, or his ministry, which is believed to engage in illegal phone-tapping, was behind the leaking of the telephone recordings to the internet, ostensibly in an attempt to discredit Saakashvili. Irakli Alasania, the leader of Alliance for Georgia coalition, pressed authorities to carry out expert analysis of the recordings, and also said that foreign experts should participate in verifying whether the recordings are authentic. Giorgi Targamadze, the leader of the Christian-Democratic Movement, called for an ad hoc parliamentary commission to investigate the case, but his proposal was knocked back by lawmakers of the ruling party, who dismissed it as "not serious".

== International reaction ==
Andrei Nesterenko, the spokesman for the Russian Ministry of Foreign Affairs said the Imedi program was irresponsible and immoral, and that Russia understood the anger in Georgia as a result of the airing. He also accused the government in Georgia of "political paranoia". Nesterenko also stated that Saakashvili's comments on the programme amounted to his approval of its contents. Dmitry Rogozin, the Permanent Representative of Russia to NATO, in an interview with Russia Today said that the programme was a grandiose provocation, and was the continuation of an information war that Saakashvili continued to wage against Russia. Sergey Markov, a member of the Russian State Duma, opined that the programme was aimed at the opposition forces in Georgia, rather than Russia. Markov also stated that hatred towards Russia was part of Saakashvili's political agenda, and that it was a priority that those who cross him by seeking contacts with Russia be discredited, whilst according to BBC News, some also saw the report as a thinly veiled swipe at Georgian opposition figures who met Russian prime minister Vladimir Putin in an attempt to mend Georgia–Russia relations. Nino Burdzhanadze met with Putin in Moscow the week before the report, and was accused of treason by parliamentary allies of Saakashvili. Russian media outlets also announced intent to sue Imedi for copyright infringement, after the Georgian station used footage without permission from the Russian copyright holders.

In calling the report irresponsible, Éric Fournier, the French ambassador to Georgia, condemned the use of his image in the fake report. Imedi used archive footage of Fournier talking to journalists, and portrayed Fournier as telling viewers of results of meetings with the Georgian foreign minister, where they were briefed on Russia's military operations. Archive footage of the British and Czech ambassadors were also used in the same segment. Denis Keefe, the British ambassador in Tbilisi, stated the use of archive footage of himself was a discourtesy to him as Ambassador, and that the program did a disservice to Georgia's reputation as having a responsible and independent media. Keefe also complained that the program suggested that Saakashvili had held discussions with the British prime minister Gordon Brown about the "non-existent events described", and stated that neither he, nor the British government had any involvement in or previous knowledge of, what he called, Imedi's irresponsible programme. The ambassador also demanded that Imedi apologise and make it clear that it used his image without his consent or permission. United States Ambassador to Georgia John Bass called the broadcast irresponsible and perturbing, and said it was not helpful in improving the security situation in the region.

The European Union Monitoring Mission in Georgia stated that the airing of the program was irresponsible and had the potential to further destabilise the region, with the possibility of a resumption of military actions between Russian and Georgian troops. The Mission kept in constant contact with the Russian Border Guards and the Government of South Ossetia during the broadcast via the Incident Prevention and Response Mechanism hotline to ensure that alert levels remained at the status quo. European Commission President Jose Manuel Barroso, after a meeting with Georgian prime minister Nika Gilauri in Brussels, expressed his concern over the hoax news report and said the European Union is "hopeful that intensive work will continue to consolidate democratic institutions, create an inclusive political culture, and ensure full media freedom." Barroso also called on the Georgian government to refrain from activities which could increase local and regional tensions.

NATO spokesman James Appathurai in a briefing in Brussels on 24 March 2010 called the false news report "unwise" and "unhelpful". Appathurai also stated that the incident had not been viewed positively within NATO, but would not affect Georgia's aspirations to enter the alliance.

Abkhaz president Sergei Bagapsh called the programme "tremendous idiocy" and said that no attention should be paid to the contents of the program.

On 16 March 2010, TIME placed the fake report at number one of the "Top 10 Shocking Hoaxes", ahead of the Ashley Todd mugging hoax, balloon boy hoax, the KSJJ Ochoco Dam hoax, Sidd Finch hoax, 1938 The War of the Worlds radio hoax, Anna Anderson, Hitler Diaries hoax, Piltdown Man, and the Great Stock Exchange Fraud of 1814.

Valeria Novodvorskaya alleged that the inclusion of Lech Kaczyński's death in an aircraft shoot-down is evidence of complicity of the Russian government in Kaczyński's later death in a plane crash on 10 April 2010 in Smolensk Oblast.
