= List of companies of South Ossetia =

Companies which have been based or had operations in the disputed de facto independent Republic of South Ossetia include:

- Elektrovibromashina, where previous prime minister Shavlokov worked.
- Emal'provod, Kazakh copper and enamel company.
- Roki Tunnel, a tolled road connecting the breakaway republic to North Ossetia.

== See also ==
- List of companies of Georgia
