= GBW (disambiguation) =

GBW is the reporting mark for Green Bay and Western Railroad

It may also refer to:

- gbw, an ISO 639-3 designator for the Gabi-Gabi language
- Gain–bandwidth product
- Georgian Business Week, an English-language newspaper in Tbilisi, Georgia
- Ghribwal railway station, in Pakistan
- Glenbard West High School, in Chicago, Illinois
- Guild of Bookworkers, an American bookbinding organization
