= List of companies of Georgia (country) =

Location of Georgia

Georgia is a country in the Caucasus region of Eurasia. Georgia's economy is supported by a relatively free and transparent atmosphere in the country. According to Transparency International's 2015 report, Georgia is the least corrupt nation in the Black Sea region, outperforming all of its immediate neighbors, as well as nearby European Union states. With a mixed news media environment, Georgia is also the only country in its immediate neighborhood where the press is not deemed unfree.

== Notable firms ==
This list includes notable companies with primary headquarters located in the country. The industry and sector follow the Industry Classification Benchmark taxonomy. Organizations which have ceased operations are included and noted as defunct.

Notable companies Status: P=Private, S=State; A=Active, D=Defunct
Name	Industry	Sector	Headquarters	Founded	Notes	Status	
Badagoni	Consumer goods	Distillers & vintners	Akhmeta	2002	Winery	P	A
Bank of Georgia	Financials	Banks	Tbilisi	1903	Largest bank in Georgia	P	A
Silknet	Telecommunications	Fix and Mobile Telecommunications	Tbilisi	2010	Largest telecommunication company in Georgia	P	A
Georgian Airways	Consumer services	Airlines	Tbilisi	1994	Airline	P	A
Georgian International Airlines	Consumer services	Airlines	Tbilisi	2004	Airline, formerly EuroLine	P	A
Georgian Industrial Group	Conglomerates	-	Tbilisi	2006	Energy, logistics, heavy industry	P	A
Georgian Oil and Gas Corporation	Oil & gas	Integrated oil & gas	Tbilisi	2006	Oil & gas	S	A
Georgian Post	Industrials	Delivery services	Tbilisi	1805	Postal services	P	A
Georgian Public Broadcasting	Consumer services	Broadcasting & entertainment	Tbilisi	1956	Television	S	A
Georgian Railway	Industrials	Railroads	Tbilisi	1872	National railways	S	A
JSC RMG Copper	Basic materials	Nonferrous metals	Tbilisi	1975	Copper and gold mining	P	A
Kutaisi Auto Mechanical Plant	Consumer goods	Automobiles	Kutaisi	1951	Auto manufacturer	P	A
Liberty Bank	Financials	Banks	Tbilisi	1993	Bank	P	A
MagtiCom	Telecommunications	Fix and Mobile Telecommunications	Tbilisi	1996	Largest telecommunication company in Georgia	P	A
Imedi	Consumer services	Broadcasting & entertainment	Tbilisi	2003	Television	P	A
Rustavi 2	Consumer services	Broadcasting & entertainment	Tbilisi	1994	Television	P	A
National Bank of Georgia	Financials	Banks	Tbilisi	1919	Central bank	S	A
Rustavi Steel	Basic materials	Iron & steel	Rustavi	1948	Steel	P	A
Sky Georgia	Consumer services	Airlines	Tbilisi	1998	Airline	P	A
Telasi	Utilities	Conventional electricity	Tbilisi	1998	Part of Inter RAO (Russia)	P	A
TBC Bank	Financials	Banks	Tbilisi	1992	Universal bank	P	A
Tbilisi Aircraft Manufacturing	Industrials	Aerospace	Tbilisi	1941	Aircraft	S	A
TAM Management	Industrials	Aerospace	Tbilisi	2015	Aircraft	P	A
Wissol Petroleum	Oil & gas	Exploration & production	Tbilisi	2000	Oil & gas	P	A

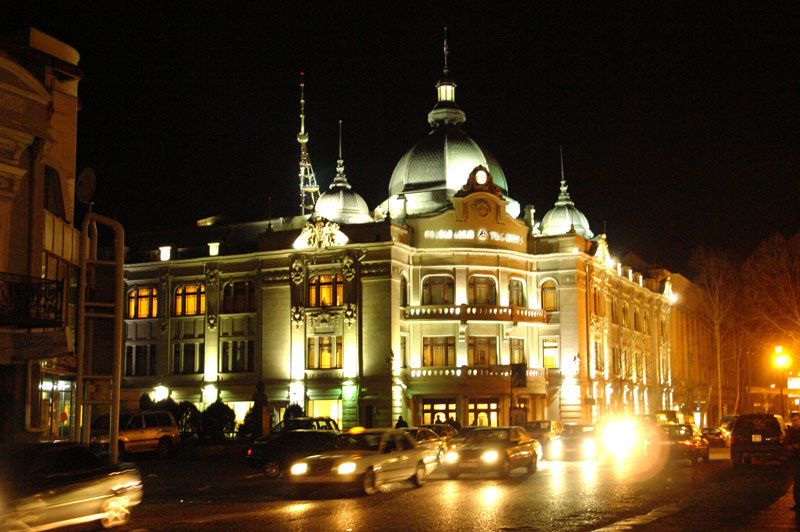
TBC Bank in Tbilisi.

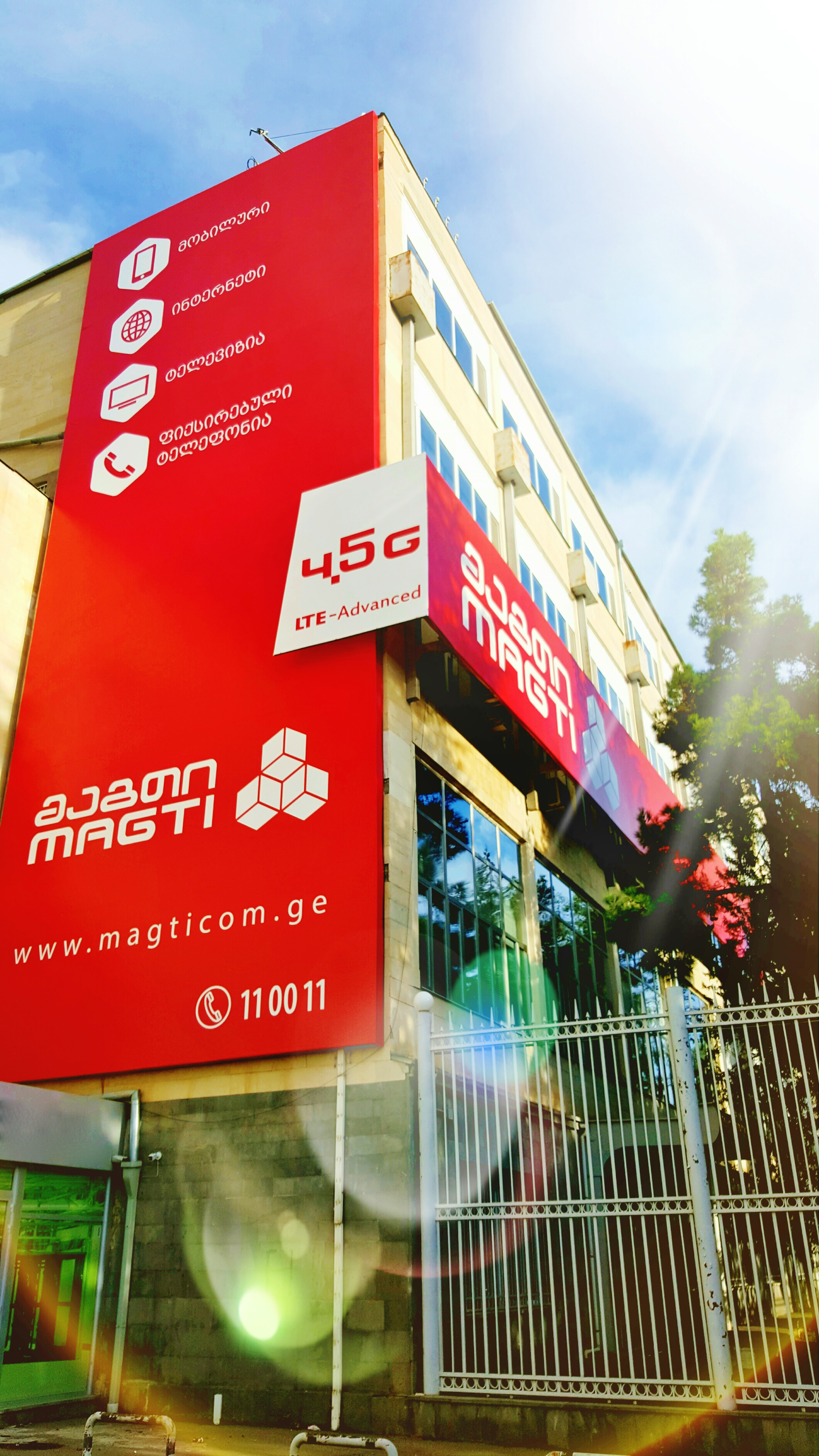
MagtiCom headquarters in Tbilisi

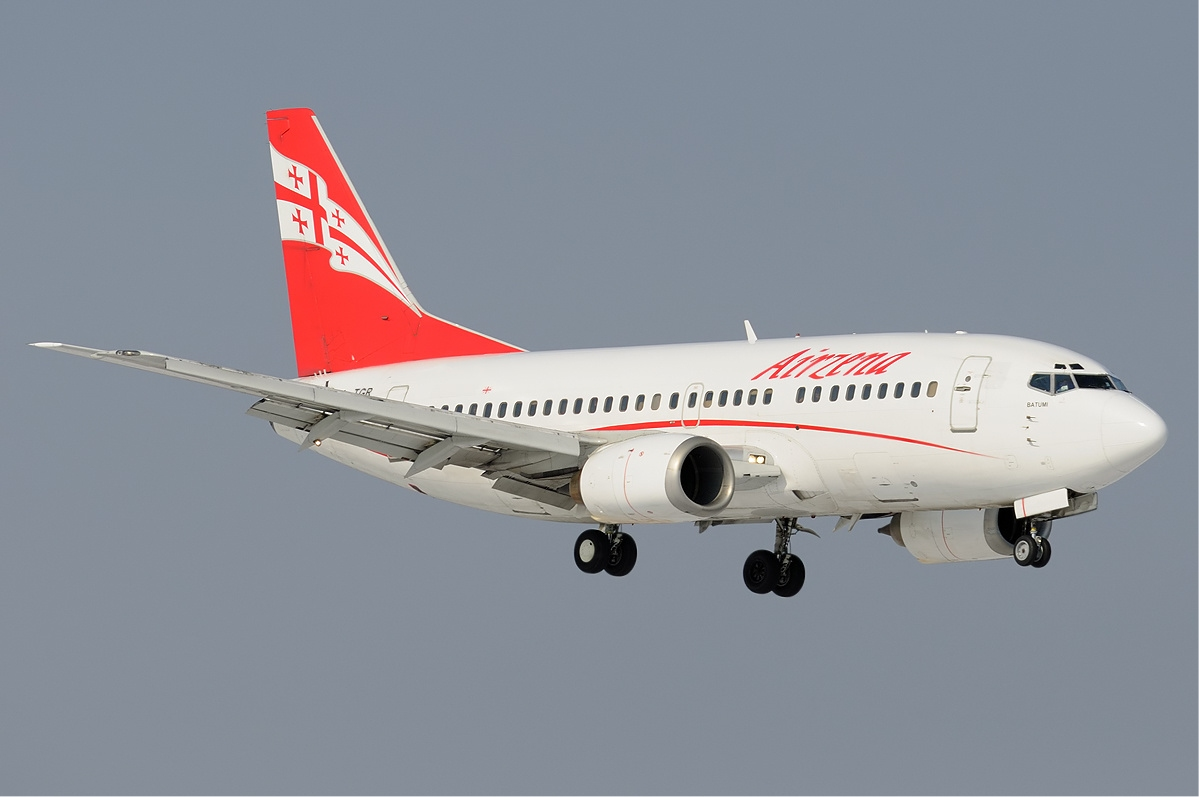
Georgian Airways Boeing 737-500.

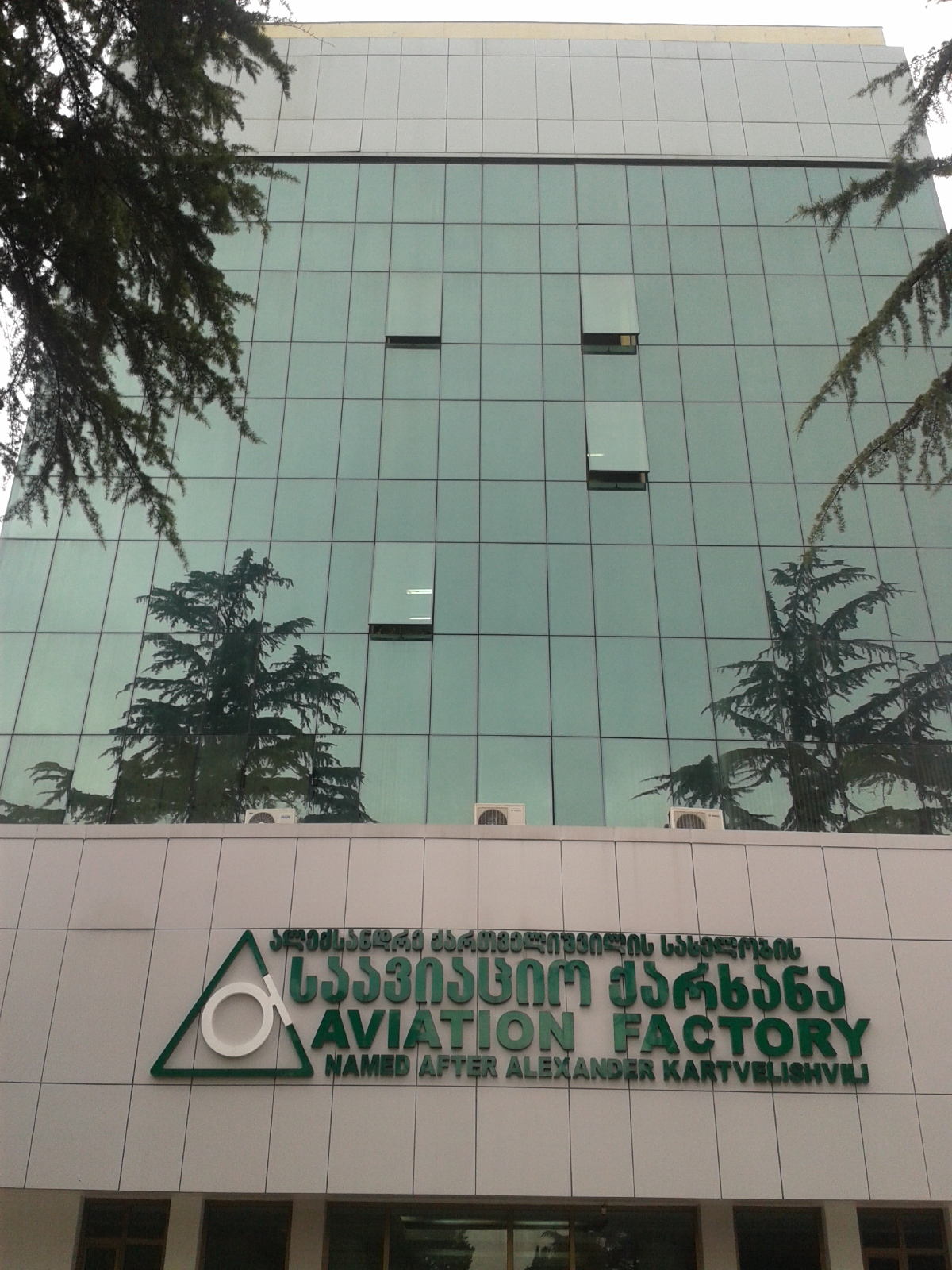
Tbilisi Aircraft Manufacturing and TAM Management HQ.
