= Geocell =

Cellular branch of Georgian telecommunication company Silknet

- Type: Subsidiary
- Industry: Telecommunications
- Founded: 1996
- Headquarters: Tbilisi, Georgia
- Products: Mobile telephony
- Operating income: ▲$140 million (2011)
- Parent: Silknet
- Website: silknet.com

Geocell (Georgian: ჯეოსელი) is a mobile communication brand owned by Silknet. Geocell is the first GSM operator that entered the Georgian market.

Geocell was founded as an independent company in 1996 with a shared Georgian and Turkish investment. Control of the company was held by the Georgian side. The company's 900 MHz GSM network became fully operational in March 1997.

On 27 March 2001, Geocell acquired Georgia's third largest GSM provider "GT Mobile", renamed it into its second brand "Lai-Lai", and started operating on the 1800 MHz frequency.

Alongside standard GSM and GPRS services, the company owns a UMTS license (2100 MHz), enabling 3G technologies including HSDPA.

From 2007 until 2018, Geocell was part of the TeliaSonera Group. Since 2018 it has been a part of Silknet.

Geocell's coverage area occupies more than 98% of the country's territory. Geocell subscribers are able to use roaming service in 150 countries worldwide.

Nowadays, the number of registered Geocell subscribers is around 2 million people.

In December 2023, the first widely available 5G network was launched in Georgia.

== See also ==
- Geocell
- Silknet
- MagtiCom
- Beeline
- List of companies of Georgia
