= GNCC =

GNCC may refer to:

- Grand National Cross Country
- Grand National Curling Club
- Georgian National Communications Commission
