= Mzia Amaglobeli =

Georgian journalist (born 1975)

- მზია ამაღლობელი
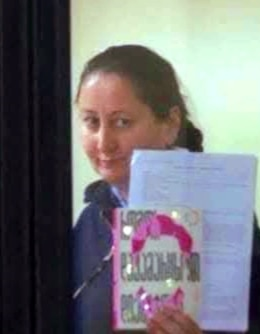
- Amaglobeli in 2025
- Born: 12 May 1975 (age 51); Shuakhevi, Adjarian ASSR, Georgian SSR, Soviet Union
- Occupation: Journalist
- Years active: 2000–present
- Organizations: Batumelebi; Netgazeti

Mzia Amaglobeli (Georgian: მზია ამაღლობელი; born 12 May 1975) is a Georgian journalist who is the co-founder and director of the online media outlets Batumelebi and Netgazeti.

On 12 January 2025, during the protests in Georgia, Amaglobeli was arrested on charges of "attacking a police officer" after she slapped the chief of Batumi Police, Irakli Dgebuadze, who was repeatedly verbally abusing her and subjecting her to obscenities. The article she was charged under is normally reserved for serious physical assaults and carries a prison sentence of 4 to 7 years. Transparency International has described her imprisonment as unconstitutional and unlawful, stating that Amaglobeli is being punished "for exposing the regime's corruption and other unlawful activities over the years."

After her arrest, Amaglobeli began a hunger strike that lasted 38 days. She said this was a form of protest against injustice. According to the Georgian Young Lawyers' Association, due to the long duration of the hunger strike, Amaglobeli's life was in danger already as of 27 January 2025. On 18 February 2025, Amaglobeli announced she was ending her hunger strike after growing public concern for her, as well as the death of two children in Batumi. In June 2025, several reports emerged that indicate that Amaglobeli's health has continued to deteriorate in jail.

On 6 August 2025, Amaghlobeli was convicted on the lesser charge of "resistance, threats or violence against a defender of the public order" and was sentenced to two years' imprisonment.

Amaglobeli is recognized as Georgia's first female political prisoner after the dissolution of the Soviet Union, and the first female journalist designated as a prisoner of conscience. In 2025, she received the Sakharov Prize annually awarded by the European Parliament.

== Early life ==
Mzia Amaglobeli was born on 12 May 1975 in the village of Chvana, in Shuakhevi district. One of her brothers died early in her life.

== Career ==
=== Journalistic career ===
Amaglobeli started her journalistic career in Batumi in 2000 as a reporter for "Adjara PS" newspaper. In 2001, Amaglobeli and her friend and colleague Eter Turadze founded the independent media organization "Batumelebi" in the form of a non-periodical printed newspaper. Since the founding of the newspaper company, Amaglobeli has been its primary journalist, editor, and chief executive officer.

The establishment of Batumelebi was a direct response to the widespread violations of the rule of law, human rights abuses, and widespread corruption during the rule of Aslan Abashidze, the leader of Adjara. In 2003, under pressure from the authoritarian regime in Adjara, the Batumi City Court revoked the company's legal registration, after which the authorities consistently refused to allow Amaglobeli to re-register the company under a new name. With the support of the International Center for Journalists (ICFJ), Amaglobeli successfully registered a new organization in Tbilisi, and officially renamed to "Gazeti Batumelebi" in 2003.

Under Amaglobeli's leadership, her media organization won numerous awards for courageous journalism and ethical reporting. In 2009, Batumelebi and in 2015, Netgazeti received the European Press Prize. This award is given to those publications that, according to the German Zeit-Stiftung and the Norwegian Foundation for Freedom of Expression, "are not afraid of censorship and repression." The media outlet angered Russian authorities, receiving the status of "an organization disseminating anti-Russian propaganda" and was banned in Russia. In 2022, Russia's communications regulator Roskomnadzor blocked the Russian-language versions of Netgazeti and Batumelebi.

=== Arrest and trial ===
The events leading up to Amaglobeli's arrest began on the night of 11 January in the city of Batumi amid protests calling for a re-run of the disputed October 2024 election; she was arrested twice that night.

Initially, she was arrested on administrative charges for trying to put up a sticker calling for a national strike. She was released on bail the following day. She was arrested again later that day near the Batumi police station for assaulting a police officer.

The video shot during the live broadcast shows her slapping Batumi police chief Irakli Dgebuadze. The footage shows her standing alongside Batumelebi editor Eter Turadze after her brothers were arrested in front of her, surrounded by several police officers as a verbal altercation takes place; a policeman (possibly Dgebuadze) can be heard threatening her. Amaglobeli then slaps Dgebuadze which leads to her arrest. It has been stated by Transparency International that the slap did not exhibit enough force to warrant an arrest.

On 14 January 2025, judge Nino Sakhelashvili of the Batumi City Court ordered pretrial detention for Amaghlobeli. The Prosecutor's Office accused Amaghlobeli of slapping the head of Batumi police, Irakli Dgebuadze, allegedly motivated by "revenge".

The court rejected the defense's proposal of a 100,000₾ bail. The prosecution's arguments were based on risks of flight, failure to appear in court, destruction of evidence important to the case, and the potential for repeated offenses. However, the judge showed no interest in the evidentiary basis for these risks when ordering Amaghlobeli's detention. The Georgian Young Lawyers' Association (GYLA) argued that there is no justification for pretrial detention in this case, as there were no risks of flight, witness tampering, or obstruction of the investigation by Amaghlobeli.

One of the grounds for the justification of Amaghlobeli's detention was the falsified record of her administrative detention. According to GYLA chairwoman Nona Kurdovanidze, Amaghlobeli's detention was first carried out under Article 150 (defacement of property), but after the police realized that this could not be used as a legal basis for detention, they instead recorded the case under Article 173 (disobeying law enforcement), claiming that she had verbally insulted officers. Kurdovanidze also argued that the temporary placement of a sticker cannot be considered any kind of offense.

During the court hearing, Amaglobeli appeared with Maria Ressa's book How to Stand Up to a Dictator, which she used to draw parallels between the book's narrative and the repressive and authoritarian politics of the Georgian Dream government. Ressa responded with a statement about the protests in Georgia and Amaglobeli's detention during a speech at a Vatican jubilee event.

Monitors and human rights defenders who were able to communicate with Amaglobeli demanded investigation of her ill-treatment after the second arrest. According to Amaglobeli's account, she was verbally and physically harassed at the police station. She alleges that police chief Dgebuadze swore at her, spat in her face, and made several attempts at physically abusing her but was stopped by other policemen.

On 21 January, the Kutaisi Court of Appeals refused to review the complaint regarding the modification of Amaglobeli's pretrial detention.

On 18 Маrch, a Batumi City Court judge announced his verdict regarding Amaglobeli's administrative charges. In the final session, the defense side presented video evidence and argued that her detention protocol had been false for two reasons: it was signed by one police official, while Amaglobeli was in reality detained by another one and, besides, she was putting up a sticker on the wall, and not verbally insulting a policeman as the authorities initially claimed. However, the judge ruled that the journalist had disobeyed their lawful demands and sentenced her to a 2,000₾ fine.

On 6 August 2025, Amaghlobeli was convicted on the lesser charge of resistance, threats or violence against a defender of the public order or other government officials and was sentenced to two years' imprisonment. As of 27 September 2025, Amaglobeli has been imprisoned at Rustavi Women's Colony No 5.

In 18 November 2025, an appeals court upheld Amaglobeli's sentence.

==== Legality ====
Local and international watchdogs argue that the criminal detention of the media manager does not comply with the legal logic. They consider the classification of her actions as "assault" to be incompatible with the circumstances of the case, unfounded, disproportionate, and unjust. They declare that Amaglobeli's actions are inconsistent with the charge presented to her, and the act of slapping does not meet the criteria for a crime under the criminal code.

Amaghlobeli's lawyers state that, at worst, the media manager's actions should have been classified under Article 173 of the Administrative Offenses Code, which concerns "offensive conduct towards a police officer". In their view, the charges against the media manager are unfounded, politically motivated, and an attempt to intimidate her. Amaghlobeli's lawyer, Maia Mtsariashvili, describes the accusation as "manipulated."

Transparency International commented on the case, stating:

Mzia Amaghlobeli's actions, due to their minor significance, cannot objectively be considered a crime. According to Article 7, Paragraph 2, of the Criminal Code of Georgia: "An act shall not be considered a crime if, while formally containing elements of an act defined by this Code, it has caused no harm due to its minor significance that would necessitate the criminal liability of the person, nor has it created a risk of such harm." A slap, which could not have caused pain, is of only minor significance and could not have resulted in any serious harm.

The regime's police and prosecutor's office have exploited Mzia Amaghlobeli's actions and are attempting to impose exemplary punishment. It is evident that Mzia Amaghlobeli is not being punished for committing an act of significant danger but for exposing the regime's corruption and involvement in illegal activities over the years. Therefore, it can be said that Mzia Amaghlobeli is a political prisoner, based on the definition established by the Parliamentary Assembly of the Council of Europe.

In a statement on Imedi TV, Prime Minister Irakli Kobakhidze insisted that the legal action against Amaghlobeli was related to political activism rather than journalistic endeavors and claimed that her actions during the event served no other purpose but to demonstratively tarnish the image of the police.

== Campaign for her release ==
The local media community criticized Amaghlobeli's arrest, viewing it as an attack on free media. Protests demanding her immediate release were held in several cities across Georgia.

On 14 January, Georgian independent online media and opposition TV channels held a preventive strike in protest and ceased broadcasting for three hours. During this time, they displayed Amaghlobeli's picture in court in which she is holding Maria Ressa's book with the text: "This is what Georgia would look like without critical media. Freedom for Mzia Amaglobeli and all political prisoners of the regime. We are on strike!"

Amaghlobeli's pretrial detention was condemned by numerous international and local human rights organizations. The Media Advocacy Coalition published a letter demanding the immediate release of the media manager. The Coalition for Women in Journalism described Amaghlobeli's detention as a "blatant attack on press freedom." Local and international public figures stated that Amaghlobeli's detention was illegal and called for her release.

On 29 January, Jan Braathu, an OSCE Special Representative on Freedom of the Media, called for her release. He was joined by embassies of 14 countries, members of the Media Freedom Coalition, which published a joint statement on 30 January. The same day, Michael O'Flaherty, the Council of Europe Commissioner for Human Rights, expressed his concern regarding the arrest of Amaglobeli. He had visited Georgia from 21 to 23 January.

On 31 January, in an interview with Radio Liberty, Theodoros Roussopoulos, the President of the Parliamentary Assembly of the Council of Europe (PACE), stated that the treatment Amaghlobeli received in the detention facility, such as being denied water and access to the restroom, was "torture".

On 4 February, on the 24th day of her hunger strike, a group of politicians, MEPs and members of national parliaments published a joint statement in which they expressed deep concern over Amaghlobeli's health conditions and called for her immediate release along with other political prisoners. On the same day, she was taken to hospital for treatment. In a letter written in the prison, Amaghlobeli was defiant, vowing that she "would not bow to this regime". The BBC called her a symbol of resistance.

On 7 February, in a statement issued by EU High Representative for Foreign Affairs and Security Policy Kaja Kallas and Commissioner for Enlargement Marta Kos called Amaghlobeli "a symbol of courage of all those unjustly detained".

On 10 February, the Kutaisi City Court imposed a fine of 5,000₾ on each of the nine activists, including several well-known individuals, who had held a protest in solidarity with Amaghlobeli in front of a judge's house two weeks earlier.

On 15 February, Iranian lawyer, human rights activist, and Nobel Prize laureate Shirin Ebadi addressed the imprisonment of Amaglobeli in a letter. Shared by Salomé Zourabichvili on X, the letter condemns restrictions on press freedom, stating that the detention of journalists is in no way justified and underscoring that freedom of speech is the foundation of democracy. Ebadi expressed hope that Amaglobeli would be released soon and allowed to continue her work.

Оn 26 March, Michael O'Flaherty, the Council of Europe Commissioner for Human Rights, made another statement regarding the state of human rights in Georgia. He stated that Amaglobeli's long-term pre-trial imprisonment was unacceptable and called on the authorities to release her immediately, also ensure a fair treatment and the presumption of innocence.

On 25 June, PEN Georgia also drew attention to Amaglobeli's worsening health condition in jail, specifically her rapidly deteriorating eyesight which is said to now require medical attention. According to Amnesty International, Amaglobeli is now largely blind in her left eye.

== Awards and recognition ==
Оn 9 October 2025, Amaglobeli, along with six other journalists, was named a 2025 World Press Freedom Hero. This award presented annually by the International Press Institute in partnership with International Media Support, recognizes journalists who have shown an unwavering commitment to press freedom.

Amaglobeli was presented with the Forum 2000 International Award for Courage and Responsibility in Prague on 12 October 2025. This annual conference awards individuals or institutions that prioritize the protection of democracy, human rights, and civil liberties above personal interests.

On 22 October 2025, during a ceremony held in Strasbourg, President of the European Parliament, Roberta Metsola, named Amaglobeli as one of the two winners of the 2025 Sakharov Prize for Freedom of Thought, along with jailed Belarusian journalist Andrzej Poczobut. Amaglobeli was the first Georgian winner of the prize.

At another ceremony held in Hamburg on 6 November 2025, Amaglobeli was announced the winner of the Free Media Award annually given to distinguished Eastern-European media organizations or individuals.
