= Silk Road Group =

- Type: Joint-stock company
- Founded: 1997
- Founder: George Ramishvili
- Headquarters: Tbilisi
- Subsidiaries: Silknet
- Website: Silkroadgroup.net

Silk Road Group is a privately held investment company, owned and run by Georgian and European partners.

== History ==
"Silk Road Group" was founded in 1997 by George Ramishvili. The company owns Silknet, the largest fixed-line, cable TV, broadband, and IPTV provider in Georgia along with GeoCell the Georgian mobile phone network.

The company is a force behind the restoration of the winery and palace at Tsinandali and the launch of a classical music festival there.
