= Maestro (TV channel) =

Georgian television channel

Maestro მაესტრო
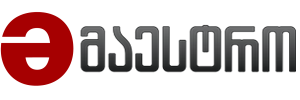
- Country: Georgia
- Headquarters: Tbilisi

Ownership
- Owner: Imedi Media Holding

History
- Launched: 1995

Links
- Website: www.maestro.ge

Maestro (Georgian: მაესტრო maest’ro) is a Georgian television channel launched in February 1995, located in Tbilisi.

== Satellite dishes affair ==
On July 2, Maestro TV announced that one of its co-owners and its financial backer, Maka Asatiani, was planning significant investments for further development of the television channel. The TV channel is available through some cable providers mainly in Tbilisi and via satellite. As part of the efforts to broaden the scope of audience, Maestro TV said earlier that month, it was planning to launch a campaign ‘Maestro in Every Family’, involving “handing out” satellite dish antennas to households in the provinces. The satellite dishes were seized as part of an investigation into a vote-buying scheme allegedly orchestrated by Bidzina Ivanishvili for which the billionaire opposition politician was fined GEL 63.1 million. Bacho Kikabidze, general director of Maestro TV, denied having links with Ivanishvili-affiliated companies or with the politics and said the allegation by the chief prosecutor's office was “absurd”. One of Maestro TV's co-owners, Mamuka Glonti, also said that satellite dishes were sold rather than handed out freely, so they could not have been involved in the vote-buying process.

== See also ==
- Media of Georgia
