= Netgazeti =

Georgian online news media

Netgazeti.ge ნეტგაზეთი
- Type: News Media
- Owner: Gazeti Batumelebi LLC
- Founder(s): Mzia Amaglobeli, Eter Turadze
- Editor-in-chief: Eter Turadze
- General manager: Mzia Amaglobeli
- Founded: 2010; 15 years ago
- Language: Georgian, Russian
- Headquarters: Tbilisi, Georgia
- Sister newspapers: Batumelebi
- Website: netgazeti.ge ru.netgazeti.ge (Russian)

Netgazeti is an independent Georgian online media outlet established in 2010 by journalists Mzia Amaghlobeli and Eter Turadze, who had previously founded the newspaper Batumelebi in 2001. The establishment of Netgazeti was intended to extend its journalistic coverage beyond Batumi and Adjara, reaching a national audience. The outlet focuses on politics, human rights, social issues, and investigative journalism.

== Overview ==
Netgazeti has been recognized for its critical reporting and in-depth analysis of government policies and regional developments. In 2015, the outlet received the European Press Prize. This award is given to those publications that, according to the German Zeit-Stiftung and the Norwegian Foundation for Freedom of Expression, "are not afraid of censorship and repression."

=== Russian-language version ===
In 2020, after a two-month testing phase, Netgazeti officially launched its Russian-language version. A significant portion of the content published by the websites of LLC Gazeti Batumelebi, Batumelebi and Netgazeti, became available in Russian, accessed from the website homepage.

According to Batumelebi's director, Mzia Amaghlobeli, the initiative aims to improve access to information for Georgia's non-Georgian-speaking citizens, including ethnic minorities, residents of conflict regions, and the broader South Caucasus. She also expressed hope that additional language versions would be introduced in the future.

=== Censorship and Discrimination ===
Over the years, Netgazeti, alongside Newspaper Batumelebi has faced discrimination, political pressure, intimidation, and harassment from government-affiliated individuals and groups, both during the rule of the United National Movement and the Georgian Dream.

The media outlet angered Russian authorities, receiving the status of "an organization disseminating anti-Russian propaganda" and was banned in Russia. In 2022, Russia's communications regulator Roskomnadzor blocked the Russian-language versions of Netgazeti and Batumelebi.

=== 2025 Events ===
On 12 January 2025, one of the founders and a director of Batumelebi and Netgazeti, Mzia Amaghlobeli, was arrested on charges of "assaulting" Batumi head of police, Irakli Dgebuadze, during a protest in Batumi. This arrest has been widely perceived as part of a broader crackdown on independent media in Georgia. In response, embassies of 14 member countries of the Media Freedom Coalition issued a joint statement demanding her immediate release, expressing concern over the intimidation of journalists in Georgia. As of 4 February 2025, Amaglobeli has been on a hunger strike since her arrest. According to her, this is a protest against injustice. According to the Georgian Young Lawyers' Association, Mzia Amaghlobeli's life is in danger as of 27 January 2025.

== See also ==
- Batumelebi
- Mzia Amaglobeli
