= Batumelebi =

Georgian newspaper and magazine

Batumelebi გაზეთი "ბათუმელები"
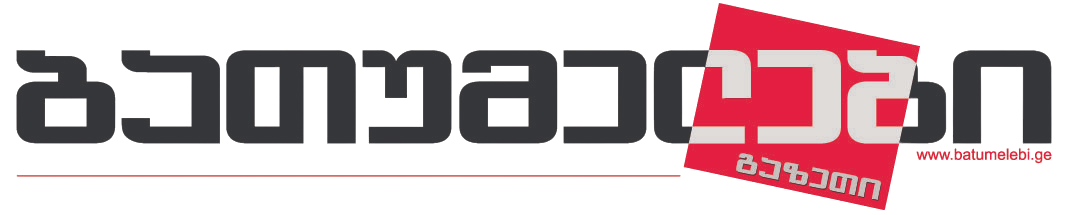
- Type: Limited liability company
- Founder(s): Mzia Amaglobeli, Eter Turadze
- Editor-in-chief: Eter Turadze
- General manager: Mzia Amaglobeli
- Founded: 2001; 24 years ago
- Language: Georgian
- City: Batumi, Adjara
- Country: Georgia
- Sister newspapers: Netgazeti
- ISSN: 2449-2949
- Website: batumelebi.ge

Batumelebi (Note: officially named Gazeti Batumelebi LLC) (Georgian: გაზეთი ბათუმელები, romanized: gazeti batumelebi, lit. 'Batumians') is an independent Georgian newspaper and an online media outlet based in Batumi, Georgia. It covers local and national news, politics, human rights, social issues, and investigative journalism. The publication is known for its critical reporting and in-depth analysis of government policies and regional developments. It is part of the "Regional Media Network," which includes other independent media in Georgia.

The newspaper covers news from Adjara, Georgia, and the Caucasus region. It also draws attention to and focuses on human rights issues, facilitating public debates, and topics related to vulnerable and marginalized groups in society.

== Creation ==
Founded in 2001 in Batumi by journalists Mzia Amaghlobeli and Eter Turadze, it began as a non-periodical printed newspaper, aiming to address issues such as human rights abuses and corruption prevalent during the rule of Adjara's 1991-2004 autocratic leader, Aslan Abashidze. In 2003, under pressure from the authoritarian regime in Adjara, the Batumi City Court revoked the company's legal registration, after which the authorities consistently refused to allow the newspaper to re-register the company under a new name. With the support of the International Center for Journalists (ICFJ), Batumelebi successfully registered a new organization in Tbilisi, and on 8 August 2003, it was officially renamed to LLC "Gazeti Batumelebi".

== Independence ==
In 2024, BBC News described Batumelebi as having "a strong reputation for editorial independence".

== Spinoff ==
In 2010 Batumelebi expanded its reach by launching the online news platform Netgazeti in 2010, catering to a national audience.

== Repression ==
During its existence, Newspaper Batumelebi has faced discrimination, political pressure, intimidation, and harassment from government-affiliated individuals and groups, both during the rule of the United National Movement and the Georgian Dream.

In January 2025, one of the founders and a director of Batumelebi, Mzia Amaghlobeli, was detained on charges of "assaulting" a police officer during a protest in Batumi. This arrest has been widely perceived as part of a broader crackdown on independent media in Georgia. In response, embassies of 14 member countries of the Media Freedom Coalition issued a joint statement demanding her immediate release, expressing concern over the intimidation of journalists in Georgia. As of 4 February 2025, Amaglobeli has been on a hunger strike since her arrest. According to her, this is a protest against injustice. According to the Georgian Young Lawyers' Association, Mzia Amaghlobeli's life is in danger as of 27 January 2025.

== Awards ==
Batumelebi won numerous awards for courageous journalism and ethical reporting. In 2009, Batumelebi received the European Press Prize. This award is given to those publications that, according to the German Zeit-Stiftung and the Norwegian Foundation for Freedom of Expression, "are not afraid of censorship and repression."

== See also ==
- Netgazeti
- Mzia Amaglobeli
