= TAM Management =

Georgian military manufacturer

Coordinates: 41°40′9.73″N 44°52′30.57″E

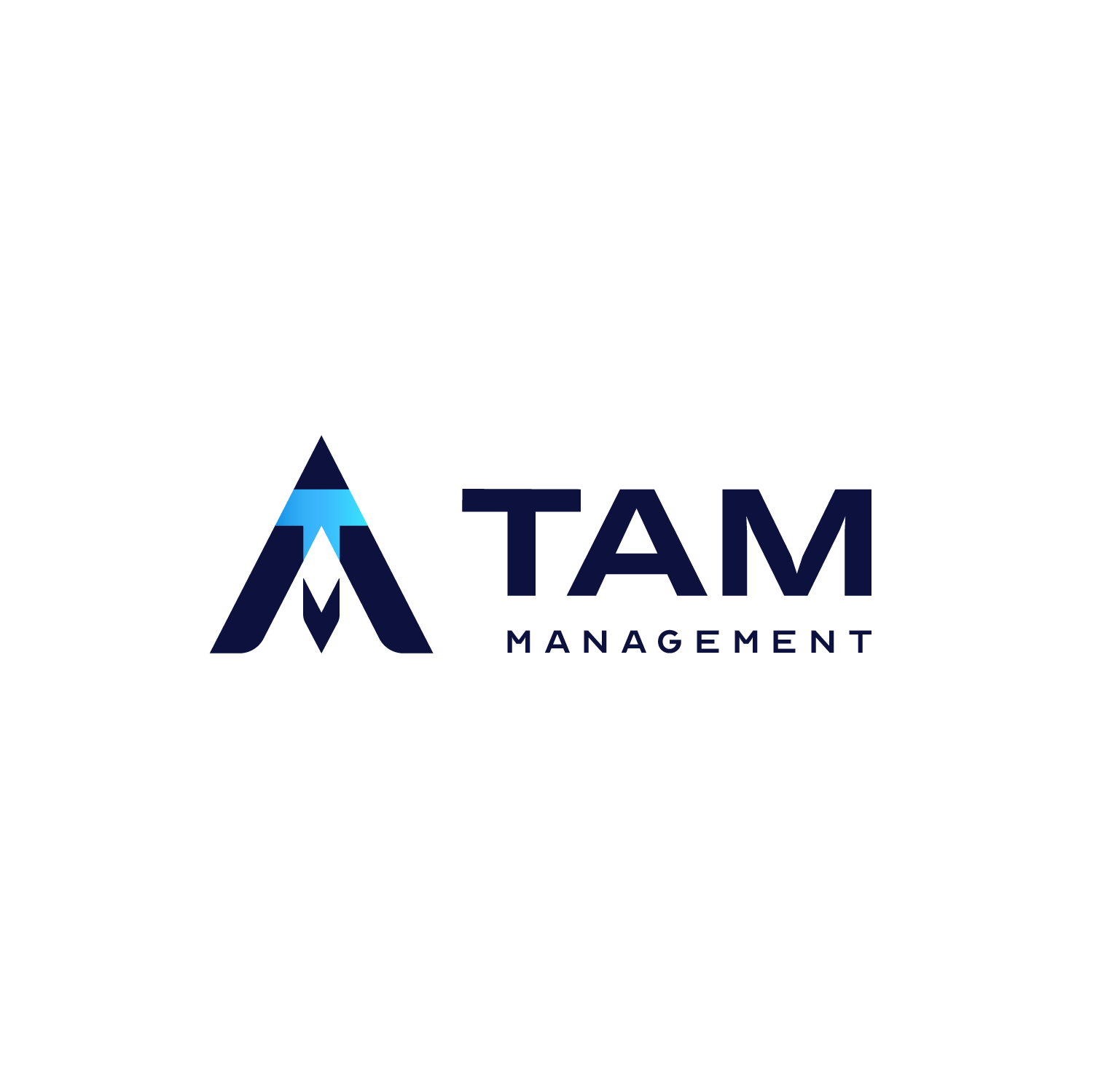
- Company type: Private defense company
- Industry: Aerospace
- Genre: Manufacturing, servicing and modernizing aircraft
- Founded: 2015
- Headquarters: 191, Monk Gabriel Salosi Ave., 0144, Tbilisi, Georgia, Tbilisi, Georgia
- Key people: Pantiko Tordia (Director) Michael Rogava (Deputy Director)
- Services: Aircraft Design; Aircraft Service; Aircraft Modernization
- Website: https://tammanagement.com/

TAM Management (TAMM) is a private Georgian military manufacturer which specializes in maintenance, repair, overhaul, design and manufacturing of military, civilian aircraft & air-to-air missiles. It was founded in 2015 on the former territory of "Tbilaviamsheni".

== History ==
TAM Management was founded in 2015 on the former territory of 31st aviation factory, which itself was founded in 1941.

During the beginning years of World War II 31st aviation factory produced over 6500 LaGG-3 fighters. Towards the end of World War II production switched to Yak-3 fighters.

In 1946, the factory produced the first soviet jet fighter Yak-15 after which the factory started producing Yak-17 and Yak-23.

From 1952 to 1957 the factory was producing MiG-15 and MiG-17 jet fighters.

After 1957 the factory produced over 1600 MiG-21's of various modifications which were used not only by USSR air forces but also exported to Algeria, Bulgaria, Egypt, Finland, Germany, India, Syria and Vietnam.

In 1974, the factory started producing R-60 "Molniya" air-to-air missiles alongside the planes.

During this period, the factory also produced K-10S supersonic anti ship missiles.

In 1978, the factory started the serial production of Su-25 close air support aircraft and has produced over 800 planes of this type to this day.

In 1984, the factory started producing R-73 "Vympel" air-to-air missiles alongside the Su-25 planes.

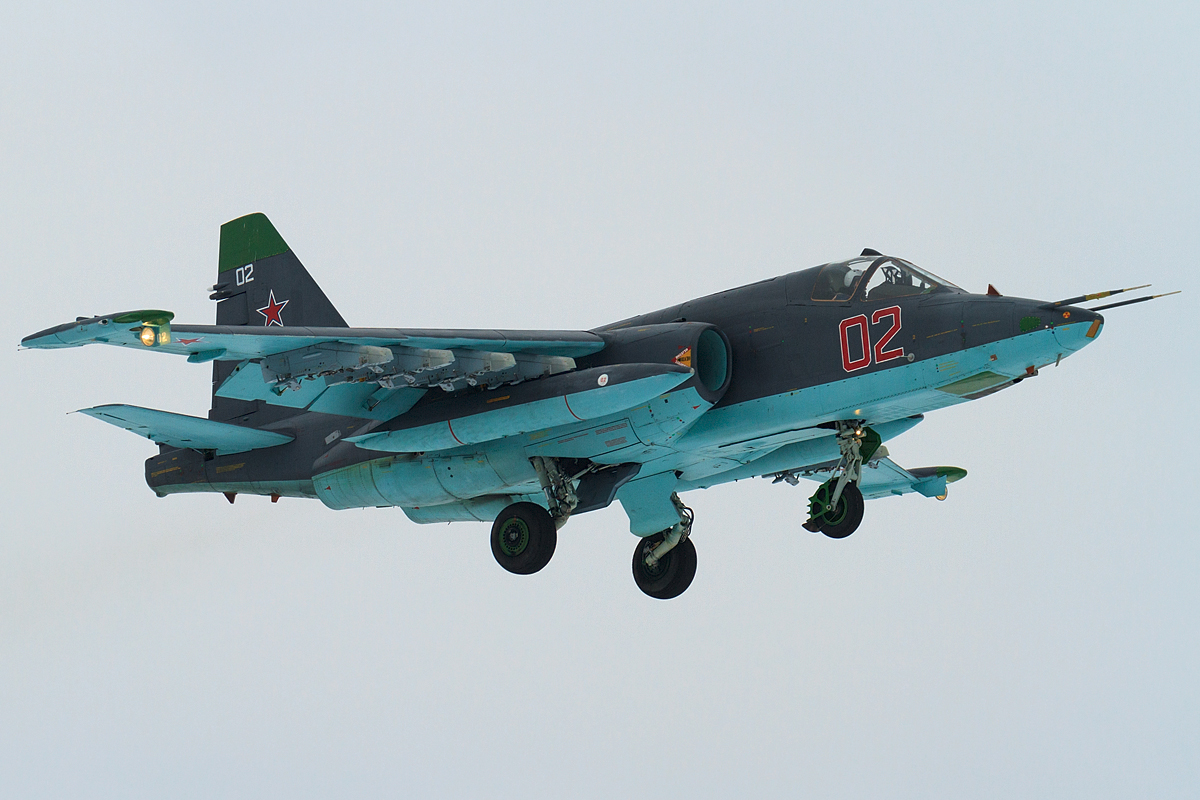
Su-25 close air support aircraft which was produced on the territory of TAM Management.

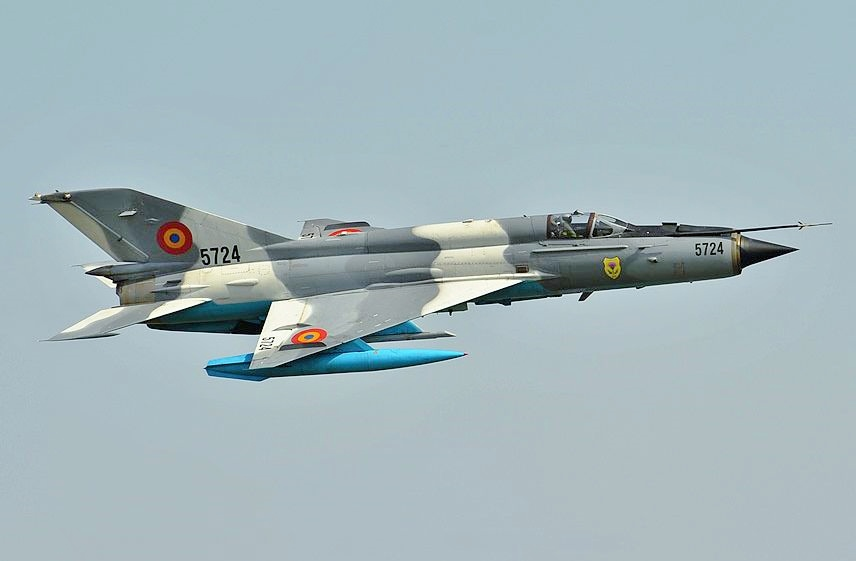
Romanian Air Force MiG-21 jet fighter. Formerly produced on the territory of TAM Management from 1957 to 1978.

== Capabilities ==
TAM Management meets the international requirements for the implementation of repair and maintenance works for various military aircraft and missiles. In addition to modernizing aircraft, the company can provide repair and maintenance services separately from modernization packages for Su-25, L-39, Mi-8, Mi- 17, Mi-24, Mi-35 aircraft and R-73, R-60 missiles.

== Projects ==
=== Chad Air Force ===
In 2019 TAM Management and "Tbilaviamsheni" completely repaired & serviced Su-25, L-39 and Mi-24 fleets of the Chad Air Force.

=== T-31 UCAV ===
TAM Management is actively developing an Unmanned Aerial Vehicle designated "T-31".

== Customers ==
- Turkmenistan
- Georgia
- Chad
