= Georgian Business Week =

Georgian Business Week (GBW) is a weekly, English language newspaper based in Tbilisi, Georgia. Founded by ltd Bziph, it is currently published by Georgian Business Week Ltd. Since 2006, Georgian Business Week has been a member of Georgian Business Consulting Media Holding (GBC), business-focused media holding, owned by the Georgian Industrial Group.

GBW runs profiles of local businesses, stock market information, expert opinion, budget and legislative commentary, financial analysis and other business-related topics. GBW has an approximate circulation of 5,000. In 2008 and 2007, Georgian Business Week has been an official media partner of the annual Economic Forum in Crynica, Poland. GBW has also been a media partner of a number of local and foreign business forums including in Tel Aviv, Israel in 2007. "Economic Forum". The GBW articles have received awards from outstanding local and international organizations, including the International Finance Corporation (IFC), the European Bank for Reconstruction and Development (EBRD) and Tbilisi-based Addiction Research Center Alternative Georgia.

In May 2008, along with GBC Media Holding, Georgian Business Week joined ICC-Georgia, the Georgian national committee of the International Chamber of Commerce, a global business organization which unites member companies from over 130 countries.
