= Akhali Kselebi =

Telecommunication company in Georgia

- Native name: ახალი ქსელები
- Type: Limited company
- Industry: Telecommunications, Mass Media, Internet
- Founded: August 2, 1996
- Founder: T&T Group
- Headquarters: Tbilisi, Georgia
- Area served: Georgia
- Products: IPTV, Internet, Fixed telephony, Internet-Television, Internet-telephony, Streaming Media TV
- Owner: Independent
- Number of employees: 700
- Divisions: CGC; MarTV; AkhTel
- Website: Official website

Akhali Kselebi Ltd (Georgian: ახალი ქსელები new web), also known as New Net, is the third largest telecommunication company of Georgia and Caucasus (After Silknet and MagtiCom). It is a private electronic communications network operator which has business relations with various leading communications companies worldwide. Company was founded on August 2, 1996. It was a new word in electronic communications development and modernization business. The company is under corporate management by the supervisory board and management. More than 700 workers are employed in the company.

Akhali Kselebi is a member of (T&T Group) consisting of the following companies:

- System Net Ltd
- Akhtel Ltd
- Foptnet Ltd
- GTC Ltd
- CGC Ltd
- Iveria Net Ltd
- Sanapiro Ltd

Akhtel (blend of ახალი ("new") and ტელეკომუნიკაციები ("telecommunications")) is one of the companies founded by Akhali Kselebi that successfully operates on the telecommunications market.
