= Kviris Palitra =

- Type: Newspaper
- Language: Georgian
- Headquarters: Tbilisi, Georgia
- Website: www.kvirispalitra.ge

Kviris Palitra (Georgian: კვირის პალიტრა) is a private weekly newspaper published from Tbilisi, Georgia in the Georgian language.
