= Silknet =

Georgian telecom company

Silknet სილქნეტი
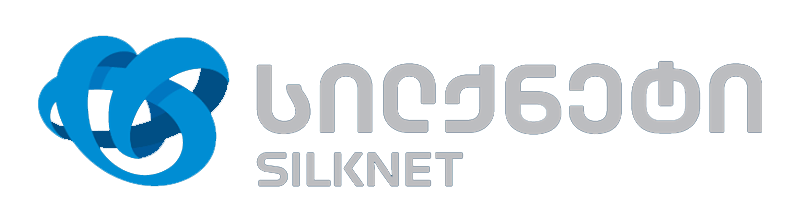
- Company type: Joint-stock company
- Industry: Telecommunications
- Founded: 12 March 2010
- Headquarters: Tbilisi, Georgia
- Area served: Georgia
- Products: IPTV, ISP, Fixed telephony, Mobile telephony.
- Net income: ▲₾161.896 million (2016)
- Parent: Silk Road Group
- Website: silknet.com

Silknet JSC (Georgian: სილქნეტი) is a telecommunication company in Georgia, and a subsidiary of Silk Road Group.

Silknet delivers various telecom services to more than one million customers across the whole country. Silknet is the largest telecommunication company in Georgia and the entire Caucasus region. Silknet provides mobile communication (branches: Geocell and S1), cable internet (branches: SilkOptic and DSL), wireless internet, IPTV (branch Silk TV), OTT Streaming TV (Silk-TV Digital), wireless fixed telephony, cable fixed telephony (VoIP, OTT), Satellite TV service (branch: Global TV). Silknet's main local competitors are MagtiCom, New Net and Cellfie.

== History ==
Silknet was established in 2010 on the basis of United Telecom and was initially registered as a limited liability company before being converted into a joint-stock company. In 2007, Silknet became the first internet provider in Georgia to deploy a fiber-optic network directly to residential homes. In 2009, the company introduced IPTV with rewind functionality under the brand Silk TV, which was considered a technological innovation in the Georgian market at the time. In 2014, Silknet launched SilkGo, a digital application that enables users to access television content on smartphones, tablets, and other compatible devices. The same year, the company acquired an 85% stake in the television network GMG (later GMN), which operated six film and sports channels across the country. The remaining 15% stake was acquired in 2016.

In 2018, Silknet acquired Geocell. This was the largest acquisition of a company in Georgia.

== See also ==
- MagtiCom
- Geocell
- List of mobile network operators in Europe
