= Georgian National Communications Commission =

- GNCC

Agency overview
- Formed: July 1, 2000
- Agency executive: Kakhi Bekauri, Chairman
- Website: Official website

The Georgian National Communications Commission is an independent regulatory authority that regulates TV broadcasting, Radio broadcasting, fixed/mobile telephone and internet services in Georgia.

The Commission was formed on July 1, 2000

== Independency ==
Commission is independent body and is not subordinated to any state authority, but during implementation process of important projects or reforms commission actively collaborates with the government and often is initiator of legislative changes.

Commission presents its annual report to the President of Georgia, to the Parliament of Georgia and to the Government of Georgia.

== Budget ==
The Commission's source of income is regulation fee paid by authorized entities and license holders in broadcasting and electronic communications sectors. For the broadcasters defined regulation fee is 0.5% of income and for the authorized entities in electronic communications sector - 0.75% of their income.

== Appointment ==
The Commission consists of five members. The members of the Commission are elected for the term of 6 years by Parliament from candidates selected by the President.. The Chairman of the Commission is elected for the period of 3 years by the majority of staff by the Commission itself for one term only.

Since May 19, 2017 Chairmen of the Commission is Kakhi Bekauri. Members of the Commission are Vakhtang Abashidze, Eliso Asanidze, Giorgi Pruidze and Merab Katamadze.

Together with the Commission acts Public Defenders office of Consumers interests’ protection. On 2014, Tamta Tepnadze was appointed as public defender of consumer's rights.

== Functions ==
=== Activities ===
- Licensing/authorization of activities in broadcasting and electronic communications sectors
- Disputes settlement between the authorized entities subjected to the Commission regulations, as well as between them and the consumers
- Issuance of Permits for numbering resource and radio frequency spectrum usage
- Study and analysis of various segments of the electronic communications market, identification of the authorized entities with significant market power, assignment of specific obligations to them
- Regulation of the access to telecommunications networks and infrastructure
- Promotion of standardization, certification and metrology service system implementation
- Control of compliance with the requirements of the applicable law in the communications sector and appropriate response

== Former chairs ==
Vakhtang Abashidze	2014-2017
Akaki Sikharulidze	2014
Karlo Kvitaishvili	2013
Irakli Chikovani	2009-2013
Giorgi Arveladze	2007-2009
Zurab Nonikashvili	2007
Dimitri Kitoshvili	2004-2007
Vakhtang Abashidze	2000-2004
