= MagtiCom =

Georgian telecommunications company

MagtiCom, LLC.
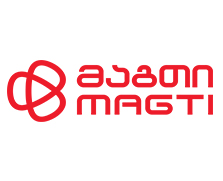
- Type: Joint venture
- Industry: Telecommunications
- Founded: February 12, 1996; 30 years ago
- Founder: Dr. George (Gia) Jokhtaberidze
- Headquarters: Tbilisi, Georgia
- Number of locations: 50 Customer Sales Offices; 88 Outlets in Public Service halls
- Area served: 99% of the populated territory of Georgia
- Key people: Giorgi Gagnidze (CEO)
- Products: Mobile Telephone; Cable Fixed Telephony (VoIP); Mobile Broadband; Internet Television; Fiber-optic Internet
- Owner: ITC LLC (USA); Telcell Wireless LLC (USA)
- Website: MagtiCom official website

MagtiCom, LLC. (Georgian: მაგთიკომი) is a Georgian telecoms company founded on February 12, 1996 by Dr. George (Gia) Jokhtaberidze. On September 22, 1997, the Company made the first commercial call from its mobile network. The services offered by MagtiCom involve as follows: mobile telephony; mobile internet – embracing different technologies of mobile network development, such as: 2G, 2.5G, 3G, 3.5G, 4G, 4.5G and 5G; Cable fixed telephony (VoIP); internet television (IPTV) and fiber-optic internet. Since 2016 MagtiCom started to provide IPTV, VoIP and fiber-optic internet.

Currently, the MagtiCom mobile network provides: GSM (2G and 2.5G), UMTS (3G and 3.5G HSPA+), LTE (4G, 4.5G LTE-Advanced) and 5G. These technologies are implemented on 700, 800, 900, 1800, 2100, 2600 and 3500 MHz frequency bands.

The coverage area of "MagtiCom" network is 99% of the populated controlled territory of Georgia (with 18 598 base stations). The Company leads the mobile market (with the 41.2% of market share; june 2025). MagtiCom provides various services to nearly 3 million customers by means of 50 customer care offices and 91 Outlets in Public Service halls. MagtiCom contributes 3,315,694,734 lari to the development of Georgian economy as of October 2026. Since 2016, MagtiCom has been an ISP and, as a result, a provider of a total range of communications services.

Since November 2017, Magticom has been the market leader ISP operator in Georgia.

== Owners ==
MagtiCom LLC was founded on February 12, 1996 by Dr. George (Gia) Jokhtaberidze, who owns 75% of the Company and exercises the full control thereover. See Chart 1 to learn about the owners and the ownership shares thereof.

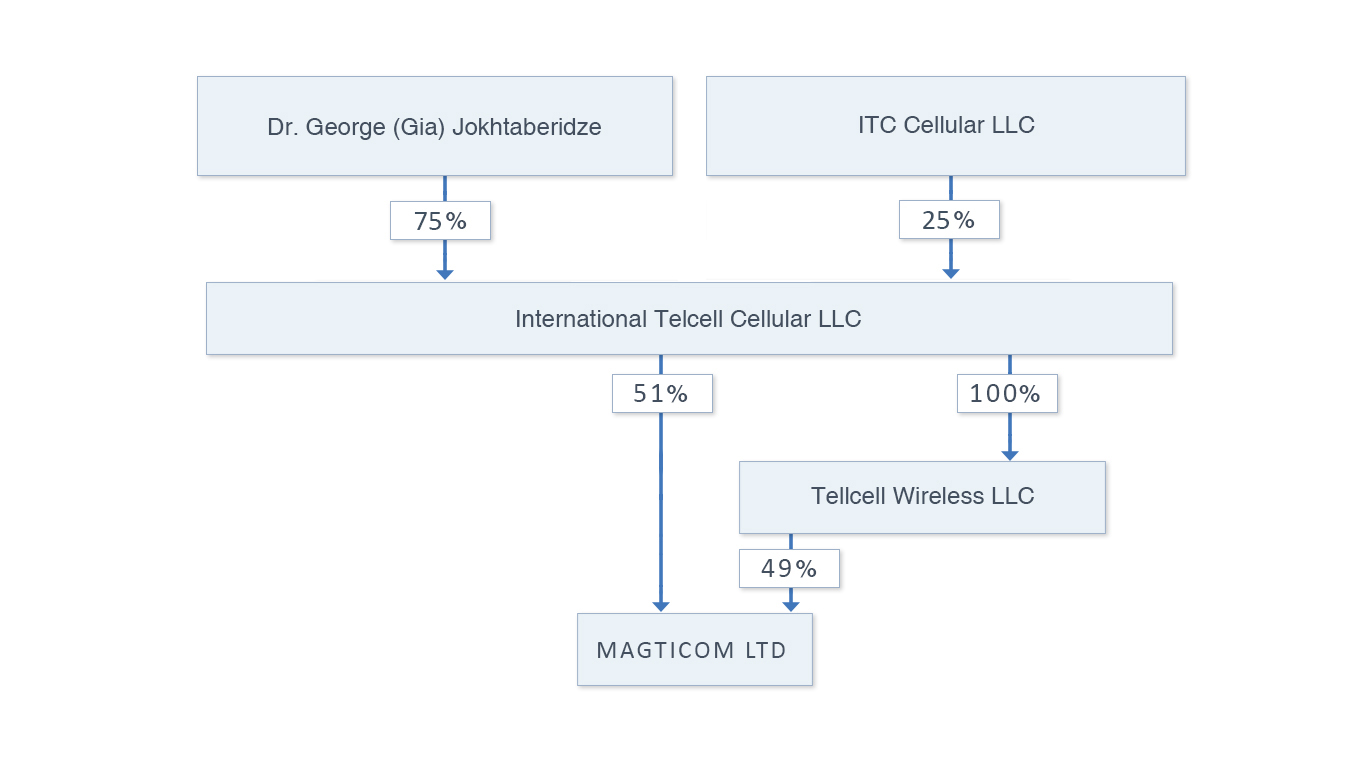
(Chart 1)

== History ==
=== Milestones ===
MagtiCom logo, 2016-present

- September 22, 1997 – the first commercial call was made from the MagtiCom network;
- 2001 – the first GPRS call was made as a result of constructing the GPRS network;
- 2005 – Bali – the youth brand of MagtiCom was launched;
- 2005 – MagtiCom became the owner of the operational license of CDMA 800 MHz standard;
- 2006 – as a result of deployment the 3G network, the 3G services such as video call, mobile TV and high-speed internet were launched;
- 2008, April – MagtiCom launched Magti Fix – a wireless-fixed telephone service based on CDMA 450 (operating on 450 MHz frequency band). In 2022 (July 29), the Magti Fix service was canceled.
- 2009 – MagtiCom, on the commission of the Ministry of Education and Science of Georgia, launched, within the frame of creating the United Educational Network, the internatization project of all the resource centers and public schools of Georgia. Having completed the layout of the network ahead of time and activated over 2,150 public schools and resource centers therein, MagtiCom has started and proceeds with rendering service to those schools and centers;
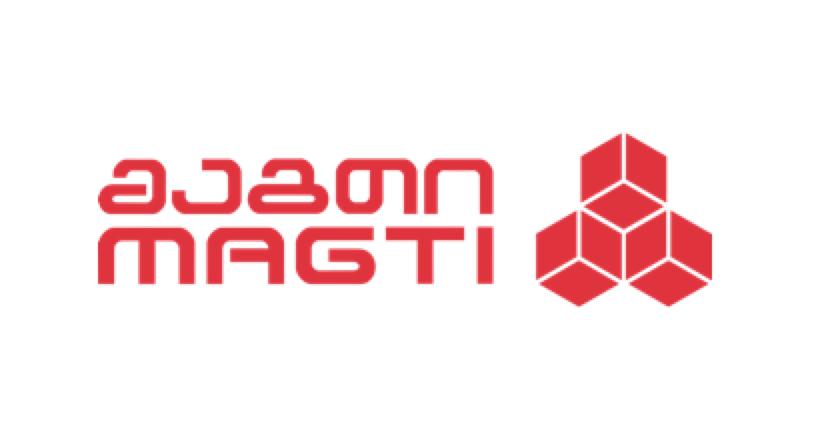
  Magti's second logo, used from 2006 to 2020.
- 2010 – MagtiCom launched Bani;
- 2012, January – MagtiCom launched MagtiSat, the first operator of satellite broadcasting in Georgia and South Caucasus region providing TV service to any point in the country. In 2022 (December 31), the MagtiSat service was discontinued and existing subscribers were migrated to Magti IPTV;
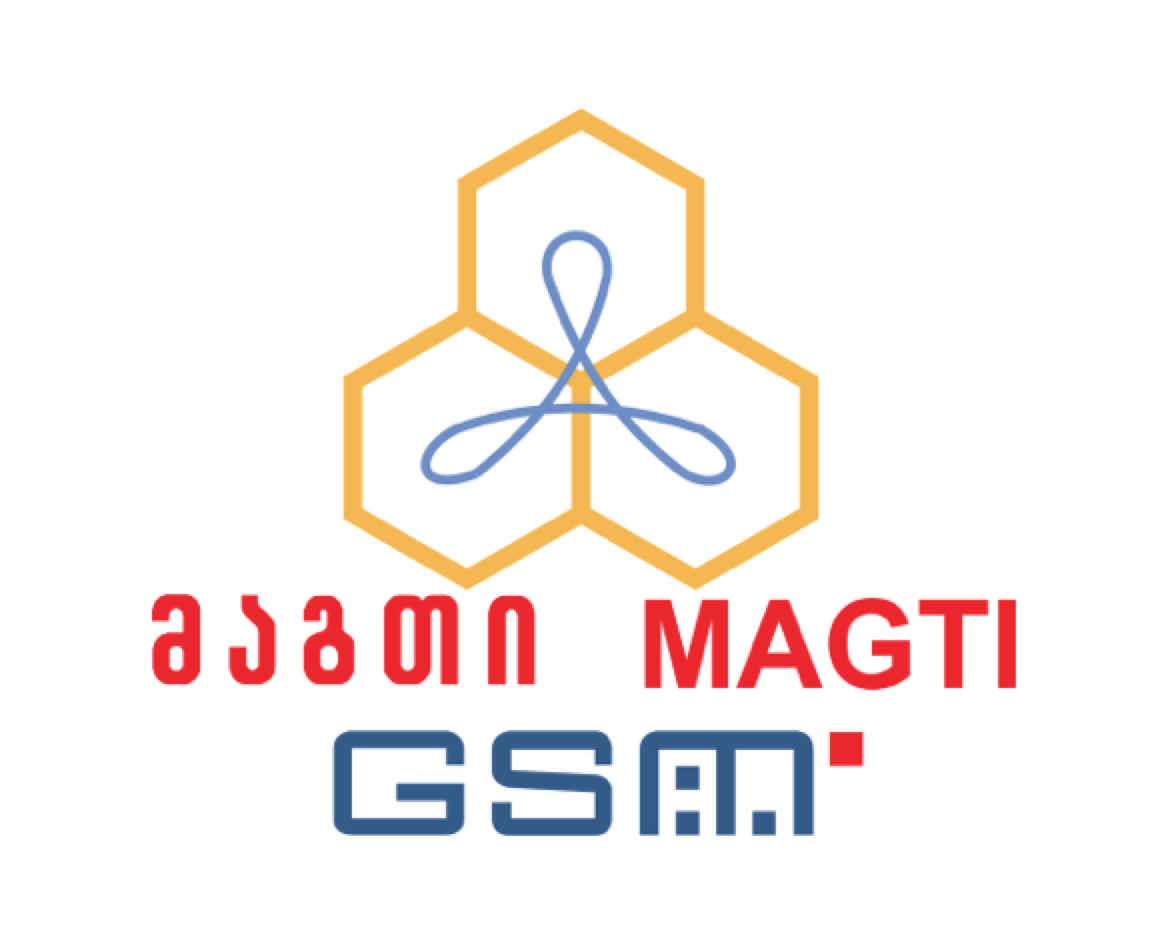
  Magti GSM's first logo, used from 1996 to 2006.
- 2013, December – MagtiCom offered 3 new movie channels of its own production dubbed in Georgian to the customers: Magti Hit, Magti Kino and Chveni Magti;
- 2015, February 1 – MagtiCom launched the 4G/LTE network covering the 92% of the populated and controlled territory of Georgia;
- 2016, May 30 – MagtiCom, LLC. and Caucasus Online LLC signed the purchase contract of operational assets;
- 2016, May 31 – MagtiCom began to offer LTE Advanced service for the first time in the telecommunications market in Georgia;
- 2016, August 1 – MagtiCom started to provide the fiber-optic internet, internet television (IPTV), and fixed telephony to the retail market and hosting service, whereupon it officially became the first company in the Georgian market providing full communications service – mobile and fixed telephony, internet and television.
- 2016, November 21 – MagtiCom and Deltacom have signed the Contract of purchasing the 100% share of Deltacom;
- Since November 2017 Magticom is the market leader ISP operator in Georgia;
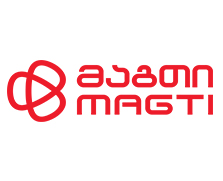
  Magti's current logo since 2020.
- According to the March 2019 statistics from the Georgian National Communications Commission, MagtiCom continues to top the charts for fiber-optic internet, television (broadcast transit), and mobile telephony;
- 2018, May 2 – First in the telecommunications market of Georgia, MagtiCom launched VoLTE (Voice over Long-Term Evolution) technology;
- 2019, March 18 – Magti TV Play – TV app for smartphones;
- From August 1, 2019, MagtiCom began to provide ESIM services.
- 2020, On August 13, MagtiCom has started testing 5G technology;
- 2020, On September 22 MagtiCom changed their logo;
- 2021, On February 12, umlaut, a global consultancy company, recognizes Magticom network as the “Best in Test” in Georgia;
- 2022, February, Electronic Signature was implemented;
- 2023, August, BI (Business Intelligence) implemented;
- 2024, On January 30 MagtiCom passed the ISO 27001 compliance certification audit and received the corresponding certificate from the British Standards Institute (BSI);
- 2024, On October 23 MagtiCom implemented the 5G network.
- 2025 - According to data from the first two quarters of 2025, MagtiCom mobile network was ranked 6th globally for internet speed.
- 2026, On January 12 MagtiCom became the first company in Georgia’s telecommunications sector to introduce artificial intelligence AI Magti Chat.

== Mobile Telephony ==
MagtiCom made the first commercial call on September 22, 1997. Currently, the mobile network of MagtiCom provides the mobile technologies of the following generations: GSM (2G and 2.5G), UMTS (3G and 3.5G HSPA+), LTE (4G, 4.5G LTE-Advanced) and 5G. These technologies are implemented on 700, 800, 900, 1800, 2100, 2600 and 3500 MHz frequency bands.

According to the Georgian National Communications Commission statistics, as of December 2025, MagtiCom has 2,445,653 subscribers. making it the most popular provider in Georgia.

== Internet ==
MagtiCom offers 2 types of internet service: mobile internet since 2001 and fiber-optic internet for the consumer market since 2016.

=== Mobile Internet ===
MagtiCom started to provide WAP-based Internet in 2001, then in 2002 the Company began to offer GPRS-based internet followed by the HSDPA, HSPA and HSPA+ technologies. Since 2015, MagtiCom has been offering 4G LTE internet, while since May 2016 – LTE Advanced network and implemented 5G network on October 24th 2024.

According to the data of the Georgian National Communications Commission, MagtiCom has the highest amount of internet usage.

== Television ==
MagtiCom has offered IPTV since 2016.

According to the official data, MagtiCom has the leading position in the television (broadcast transit) market in Georgian.

=== IPTV ===
IPTV is a new generation TV standard based on Internet Protocol (IP) offering such functions as the air management, rewinding and pausing. IPTV allows for rewinding, and to stop it and to proceed with watching it from the place where it had been stopped.

=== TV Channels of the Company's Own Production ===
In December 2013, MagtiCom started to offer 3 movie channels of its own production dubbed in Georgia: Magti Hit, Magti Kino and Chveni Magti. Since 2016 the channels have been available for the customers of Magti IPTV.

== Fixed Telephony ==
=== Cable Fixed Telephony (VoIP) ===
VoIP technology offers cable fixed telephone communication via IP. Unlike traditional telephony, the voice signal is transferred digitally. MagtiCom started to offer cable fixed telephony to the retail market in 2016.

== MagtiCom Technological History ==
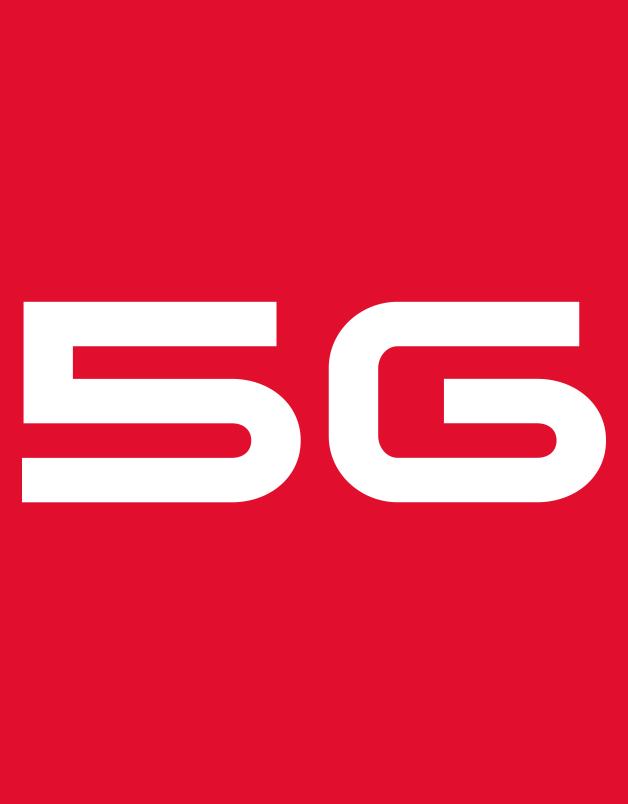
Magti 5G

The development of internet technologies in MagtiCom in chronological order:

The development of internet technologies in MagtiCom in chronological order:

- 2001 – 2G technology: transfer of SMS and small-volume data via WAPtechnology
- 2002 – 2.5G technology: MMS and GPRS technology
- 2006 – 3G technology: UMTS wireless broadband communication for mobile phones
- 2009 – 3.5G technology – HSDPA, HSPA, HSPA+ higher-speed data transfer
- 2015 – 4G technology: LTE network
- 2016 – 4.5G LTE Advanced technology became available in Georgia for MagtiCom customers.
- 2024 – 5G network

== Coverage of Mobile and Internet Networks ==
As of 2024, MagtiCom covers the 99% of the inhabited and controlled territory of Georgia.

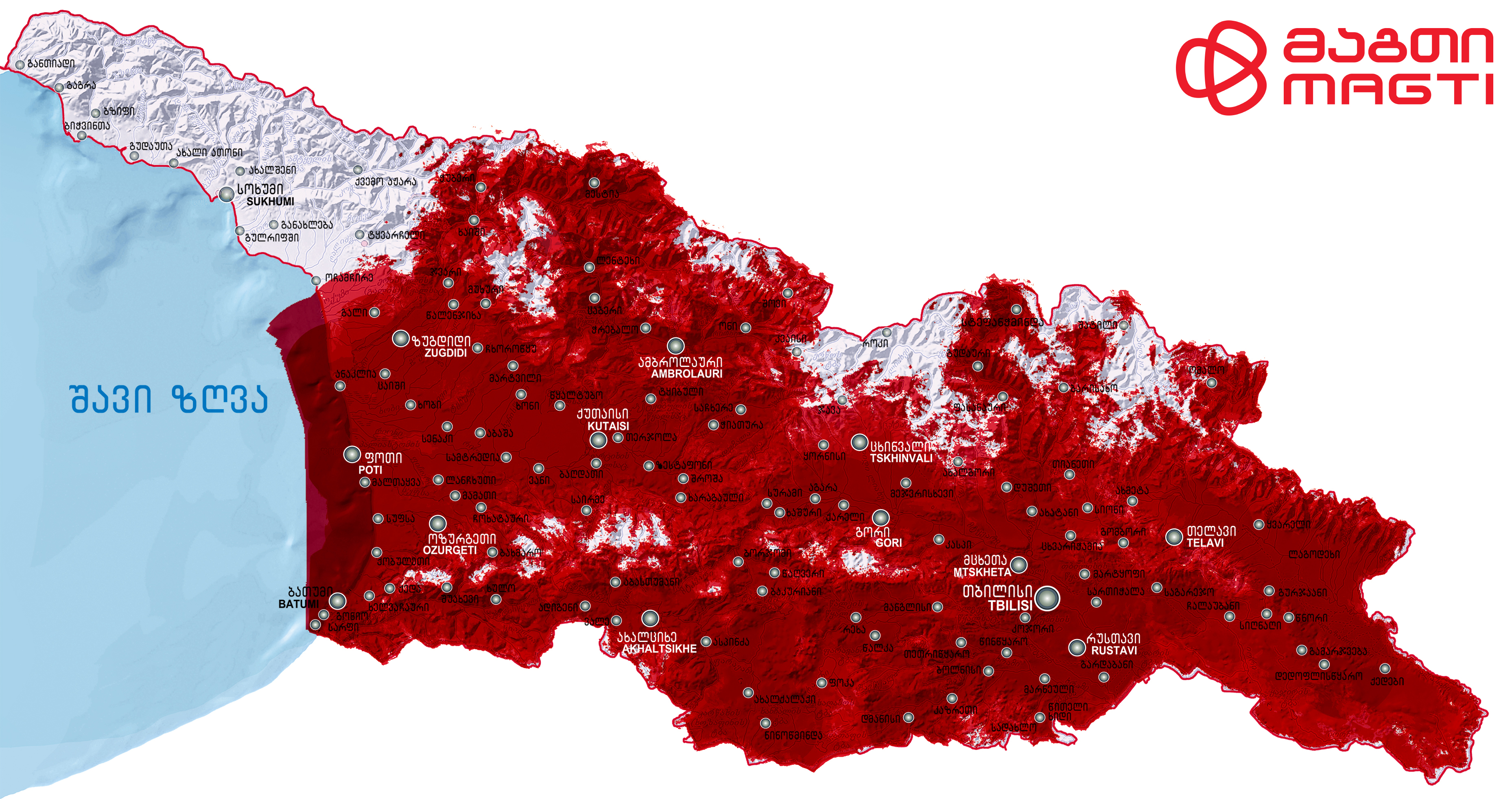

=== Base Stations ===
The company owns 18 598 – 2G, 3G, 4G and 5G base stations in Georgia.

== Customer Care ==
MagtiCom offers customer service in person and by phone.

MagtiCom has 50 offices (13 in Tbilisi and 37 in the rest of Georgia) providing services on weekdays, while some offices provide services on the weekends as well.

MagtiCom customer care offices are available at 91 outlets in Public Service halls in Georgia.

MagtiCom offers a 24-hour hotline service 7 days a week. Calling the service is toll-free for MagtiCom customers.

Customer service is provided through both a web chat and the AI-powered platform “AI Magti Chat,” enabling users to receive answers to frequently asked questions and information related to the company’s services 24/7, without waiting for an operator.

== Roaming ==
MagtiCom offers roaming services in 242 countries with 401 operators. Since 2024, 5G technology is also available during roaming.

“We do it for Georgia" is the motto under which MagtiCom has implemented projects in areas such as Georgian culture, sport, health, arts and education. A noteworthy project is the publication of books/albums of the works by Georgian cultural figures. The books/albums were distributed free of charge on the presentation day. The works – books, sets of volumes and albums – by dozens of writers, poets, artists, sculptors or architects are kept at the MagtiCom archive.

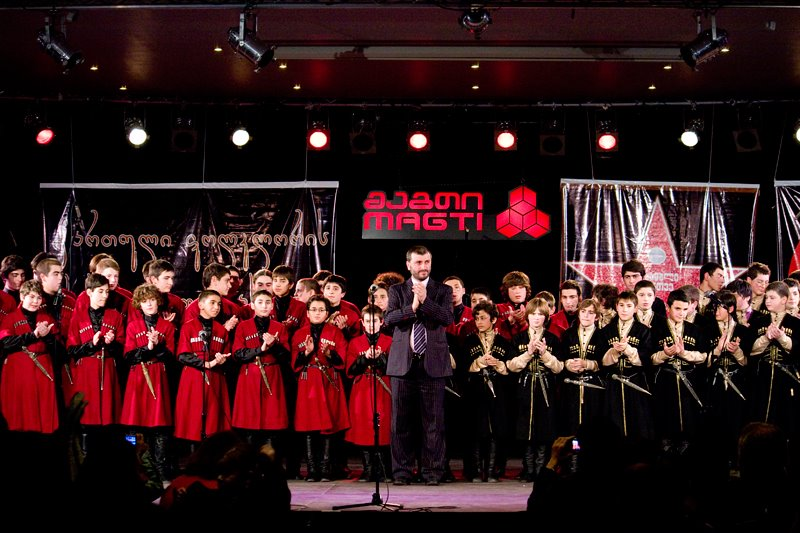

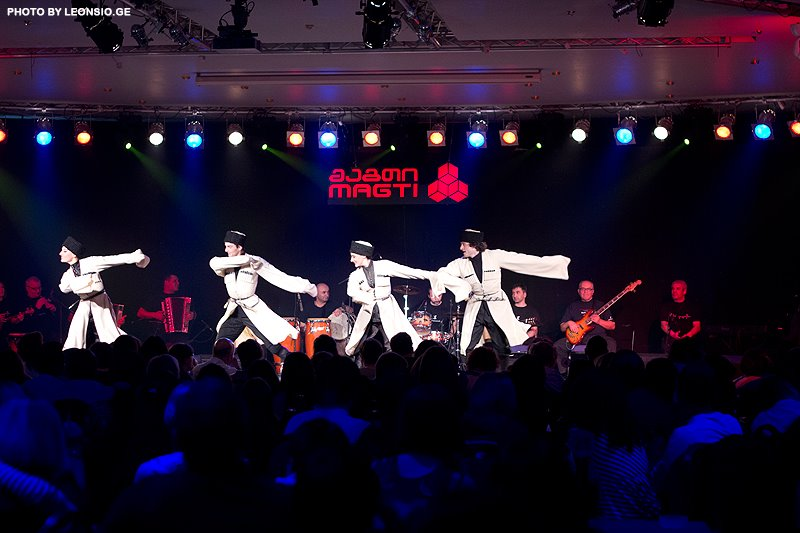

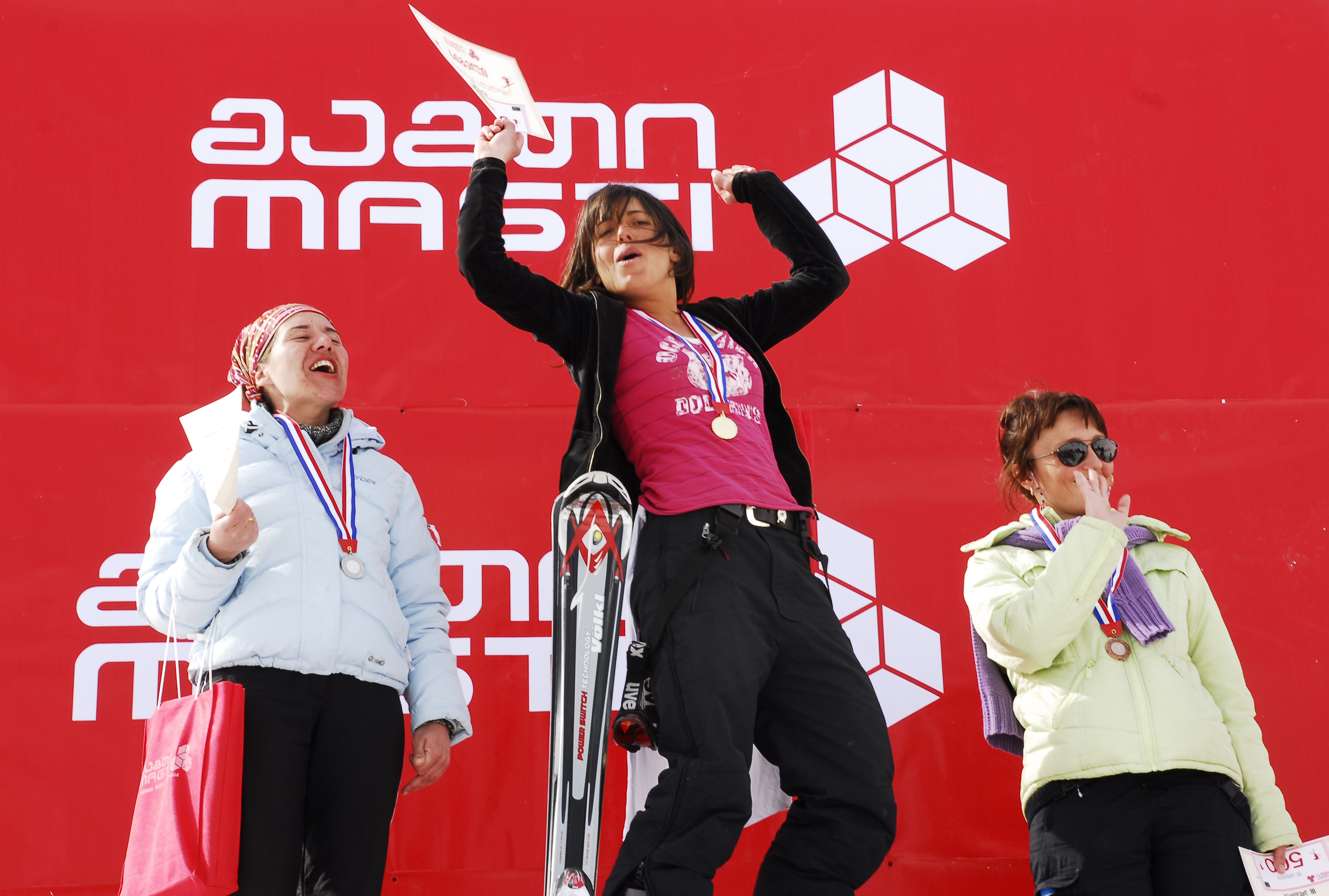

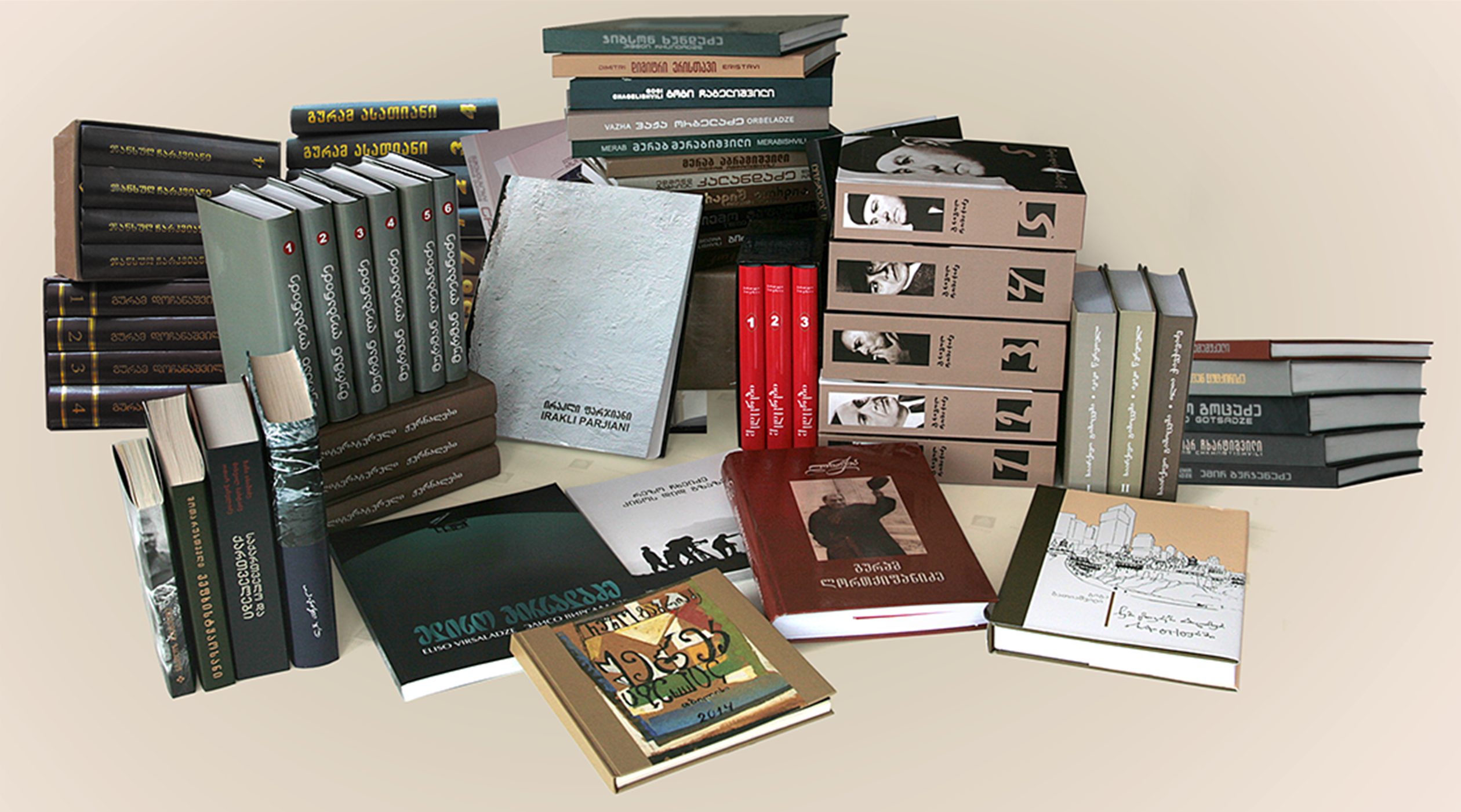
Albums and books published by MagtiCom

== "Constant" the Magazine ==
“Constant", is a quarterly magazine from MagtiCom, started to be issued in 1999. The magazine offers MagtiCom news as well as the world examples of technological progress and other interesting information.

The full e-version of "Constant" is available on the MagtiCom web-site. The circulation of the printed version makes 10,000 copies. The magazine is free-of-charge.

“Constant" is distributed both in Tbilisi and the regions of Georgia.

== MyMagti ==
Since 2014, MagtiCom has provided the mobile application MyMagti so that customers can perform various tasks electronically.

== See also ==
- List of mobile network operators in Europe
