= The Cover Up: Original Soundtrack from the Motion Picture =

2015 cover album by the Protomen

Studio album by the Protomen
- Released: January 23, 2015
- Recorded: 2011–2014
- Genres: Rock, arena rock, hard rock
- Length: 62:43
- Label: Sound Machine Records
- Producers: Alan Shacklock, the Protomen

The Protomen chronology
Terminator the Second (2013)	The Cover Up: Original Soundtrack from the Motion Picture (2015)	Act III: This City Made Us (2026)

Singles from The Cover Up: Original Soundtrack from the Motion Picture
- 1. "I Drove All Night" Released: December 21, 2012

The Cover Up: Original Soundtrack from the Motion Picture (commonly referred to as The Cover Up) is a cover album by the American rock band the Protomen, released January 23, 2015 and presented as the soundtrack to a fictional banned film (a story within a story) within the band's dystopian rock opera trilogy The Protomen.

Produced by Alan Shacklock and the Protomen in ITB Studios, the album reinterprets 1980s rock songs as "the OST of a film that never existed".

The album received positive commentary from music, gaming, and entertainment outlets. Several tracks from The Cover Up have achieved wider recognition. "In the Air Tonight" was featured in the Netflix series Cobra Kai and a 2025 Hugo Boss advertising campaign, while the Protomen's rendition of "Mr. Roboto" was credited by Styx guitarist Tommy Shaw as the inspiration to return the song to their own live setlist, performed in the style of the cover.

== Background ==
In November 2010, while performing at InDisFest in Atlanta, Georgia, the Protomen announced their intention to formally record an album of cover songs. They reported working on a covers album in August of 2011. Production on the album began in February 2011 with producer Alan Shacklock, the band's second collaboration with him following Act II: The Father of Death.

In an interview with The Tennessean on the upcoming release, band-member Commander B. Hawkins explained that the Protomen perform cover tracks "that just mean something to [them]" to show audiences "where we're coming from." Underscoring the album as an expression of the band's overall genre and approach to storytelling, Hawkins has also noted, "we're considered a video game band, but in reality we're way more of a film score band or a film band ... all of our stuff is very film soundtrack music, like 80s film soundtrack, rock and jams ... taking Mega Man into the film world in an audio format."

== Narrative and design ==
Vignette sample
Excerpt from "Silent Running (On Dangerous Ground)" demonstrating one of several fictional movie vignettes layered throughout The Cover Up.

The album is styled with a hidden narrative, being the surviving soundtrack to a banned movie within the universe of the band's dystopian three‑act rock opera tragedy, which is influenced by "Reagan-era media" like Phil Collins's "In the Air Tonight", one of the cover album's tracks. As We Own This Town explains, the album's song choices "fit within the mythology of the band." The band has described this framing as intentionally fragmentary, designed to evoke the sensation of reconstructing a lost film from incomplete materials.

Only brief vignettes of the fictional movie are directly depicted in interspersed dramatizations throughout the album.

In the album's opening track, "Pick Up", a woman answers a silent phone call. In "Hunted", the woman, revealed to be a news reporter, commiserates with a man she is on the run with that 'he' will find them. The man agrees and, when asked about his partner, described as 'the one they killed', he says she was a fighter. In "Results", a phone call is depicted in which another man asks if something was secured, before declaring that he wants results, not excuses. The call ends and something crashes as the man grunts in anger. In "Last Stop", various radio broadcasts overlap including the naming of a prime suspect in a murder. Rain and distant police sirens are heard. The man on the run declares that no matter what happens, the way they used to be together was real and cannot be taken away. At the end of Side-A of the cassette release (at the conclusion of "In the Air Tonight") a vignette of a numbers station style broadcast reads out the message, "We can hold out through this endless dark, all a fire needs is a single spark. Oh, and be sure to drink your Ovaltine". In the album's final track, "Silent Running (On Dangerous Ground)", fades to a news report discussing the legacy of a long-gone man.

According to the design firm for the 2012 single release, the Roy Orbison cover "I Drove All Night" was chosen "because of how directly it tied in with and expanded upon the band's long-running, conceptual narrative" and the artwork was designed to expand on that story. The cassette only release was described as "the final gesture" A note on the interior of the album says that the full theatrical release of The Cover Up was halted by cast and crew going missing after the initial limited release and that the soundtrack is the only part that survived, declaring "this soundtrack may be the only remaining glimpse of a work of fiction that tread so close to the truth that its creators must have ultimately paid a terrible price."

The album's cover art depicts a human hand shushing a damaged humanoid robot with its mouth removed. The back depicts a similar image with a crying human woman being shushed by a robot hand. The interior artwork depicts a shattered bust.

The album contains an example of lyrical substitution. In the cover of Iron Maiden's "The Trooper" (Note: "The Trooper" appears as track 3 of the 2014 EP and track 11 of the 2015 album) the lyric "the mighty roar of the Russian guns" is replaced with "the mighty roar of the robot guns."

The vinyl was re-released following the placement of "In the Air Tonight" in Cobra Kai with an in-universe product description: "Governmental conspiracy... Robot assassins... A race to expose the truth... The Cover Up is a cinematic masterpiece that tread too close to a dark reality to ever see the light of day. It is one of the great lost films of the 20th century. A cult classic few have seen and lived to talk about. This soundtrack of covers by Nashville concept rock outfit, The Protomen, is the only remaining testament to its existence."

== Release ==
As a teaser for the release, a 2012 limited run single cover of the song "I Drove All Night" was produced, tying in with and expanding upon the band's long-running conceptual narrative. The B-side is a cover of the Mike + The Mechanics song Silent Running (On Dangerous Ground) and a remixed and remastered version of the Protomen's Breaking Out.

By June 2014, the band announced that a downloadable EP would be made available to attendees of their Warped Tour 2014 performances to promote the upcoming full‑length album. The EP contained four tracks that would later be reissued in the final album. The download codes were printed on faux movie ticket stubs, in reference to the non-existent film, and packaged in laminate sleeves attached to a Warped Tour lanyards. During coverage of the Warped Tour, The Tennessean noted the band was "planning to release a new album of cover songs as part of a soundtrack to an upcoming movie."

The full‑length album was released on January 23, 2015, to attendees of MAGFest 13, where the Protomen were performing. The following morning, on January 24, the album was made available for pre‑order to the general public through the band's website. A vinyl release in 2015 experienced production delays. Subsequent releases include a cassette in 2015, CD album digipack in 2020, and a red vinyl repress in 2021.

== Reception ==
Game Informer noted the album's range of classic '80s ballads and considered the Phil Collins cover an improvement on the original track. Screen Rant included the Protomen's version of "No Easy Way Out" in a list of rock covers considered superior to their originals. Cat Blackard ranked The Cover Up at #3 on her "Top Album of 2015" for Consequence's annual Staff Lists.

PC Gamer described the album as a "killer ... [album] of '80s anthems" though noted fan anticipation for Act III "was always hanging over" this and the previous cover album. MetalSucks described the album as "full of kick ass 80s tunes", comparing the cover of "The Trooper" to an "Iron Maiden song as sung by Freddie Mercury". The publication also characterized the release of cover albums in the long period between story albums within the three-act rock opera as "downright frustrating".

Writing for Nashville Scene, Stephen Trageser stated, "If I believe in any band's ability to do justice to Bonnie Tyler, Cyndi Lauper, Iron Maiden and Phil Collins in the same set, it's The Protomen". We Own This Town noted the album's conceptual approach, observing that the Protomen "continue to world build even when they're covering songs written before the band (or Mega Man) ever existed." No Country for New Nashville called the album "unbelievably well-curated". Reviewers have described the album as an "excellent intoduction to [the Protomen's] style".

The album has been discussed in gaming and music review podcasts. Retronauts described the album as "a lot of fun", and "a great album on its own", while also discussing how the album's narrative framing connects to the Protomen's broader mythos. Unsung Podcast characterized the songs in the track listing as "the best of the era" and the album overall as "good covers, often great covers, of great songs".

Individual covers have received positive reviews. Duke Egbert for The Daily Vault said "The Protomen did it better" about "I Still Believe (Great Design)". The album's cover of "In the Air Tonight" received many positive reviews after its use in an episode of Cobra Kai, which prompted a resurgence of interest in the song, leading it to reach number 20 on Billboard's Rock Digital Song Sales chart and maintain position as the 7th top song on Shazam for the first half of 2021.

== Legacy ==
Tommy Shaw of Styx said the band reintroduced "Mr. Roboto" to their touring set list based on the Protomen's cover from The Cover Up. "One day I was looking to see if anyone had covered 'Mr. Roboto,' and this band, The Protomen had, covered it as more of a rock song. It was more like if Freddie Mercury would have done it. I always thought if we were going to do it, Lawrence should sing it more like that; so, that's how we play it." Shaw said they are really performing "a cover of a cover" by performing the Protomen's version in their shows. Tim Cappello, noted by the Protomen for his influential cover of "I Still Believe" in relation to The Cover Up, subsequently collaborated with the Protomen on Act III: This City Made Us.

The Protomen frequently cover "In the Air Tonight" live to positive responses. Nashville Scene wrote that the band "nailed that one, iconic drum fill and all" while also highlighting their cover of "The Trooper" and noting the influence of the track on their original music.

== In popular culture ==
The cover of "In the Air Tonight" was featured in the third season of Cobra Kai in 2021 and as a result was the 7th top song on Shazam for the first half of 2021. The use of the cover in Cobra Kai received positive commentary. Radio Times said "'In The Air Tonight' never sounded so good". The cover made Cobra Kai "so true to its source material" The Karate Kid (1984) according to Entertainment Voice. While Variety panned the use of music in Cobra Kai as "overdos[ing] on '80s kitsch", reporters Lily Moayeri and Shirley Halperin positively reviewed the use of the Protomen's "In the Air Tonight". Collider found the mix of styles eclectic but successful, saying "The fact that songs like 'In the Air Tonight' by The Protomen and 'Crank It Up' by Joey Valence & Brae can exist in the same soundtrack is beyond wild. Some wonderful needle drops here."

The same cover was licensed for a Hugo Boss underwear marketing campaign featuring David Beckham that ran in movie theatres as well as streaming services like Amazon Prime in 2025.

== Track listing ==
The Cover Up (Album)
No.	Title	Writer(s)	Length
1.	"Pick Up" (vignette)		0:41
2.	"Because the Night"	Patti Smith / Bruce Springsteen	5:05
3.	"Princes of the Universe"	Freddie Mercury	3:30
4.	"Mr. Roboto"	Dennis DeYoung	5:43
5.	"No Easy Way Out"	Robert Tepper	3:52
6.	"Last Stop" (vignette)		1:38
7.	"In the Air Tonight" (vignette (Note: cassette version only))	Phil Collins	6:34
8.	"I Drove All Night"	Billy Steinberg / Tom Kelly	5:39
9.	"Total Eclipse of the Heart"	Jim Steinman	6:59
10.	"Hunted" (vignette)		1:48
11.	"The Trooper"	Steve Harris	4:13
12.	"I Still Believe (Great Design)"	Michael Been / Jim Goodwin	5:44
13.	"Results" (vignette)		0:44
14.	"Danger Zone"	Tom Whitlock / Giorgio Moroder	4:04
15.	"Silent Running (On Dangerous Ground)" (includes outro vignette)	Mike Rutherford / BA Robertson	6:29
Total length:			1:02:43

Victory World Tour...pt. 1... North America: Cover Up EP (2014 EP)
No.	Title	Writer(s)	Length
1.	"Danger Zone"	Tom Whitlock / Giorgio Moroder	4:04
2.	"No Easy Way Out"	Robert Tepper	3:52
3.	"The Trooper"	Steve Harris	4:13
4.	"I Drove All Night"	Billy Steinberg / Tom Kelly	5:39
Total length:			17:48

I Drove All Night (2012 Cassette Single)
No.	Title	Writer(s)	Length
1.	"I Drove All Night"	William Endfield Steinberg, Thomas F. Kelly	5:37
2.	"Silent Running (On Dangerous Ground) / Breaking Out (2012 Edit)"	Michael John Cloete Crawford Rutherford / Brian Alexander Robertson / The Protomen	9:46
Total length:			15:23

== Personnel ==
=== The Cover Up (Album) ===
The Protomen

- Raul Panther
- Commander B. Hawkins
- Murphy Weller
- Reanimator Lovejoy
- Ringo Segundo
- Sir Robert Bakker
- Gambler Kirkdouglas
- T.L. Glover (Note: Usually referred to as Turbo Lover)
- Kingsley Youngblood (Note: Usually referred to as Kilroy and stylized as K.I.L.R.O.Y.)

Production

- Alan Shacklock - Producer, engineer, mix
- Caspar Newbolt - Artwork and design
- John DeLucca - Artwork and design
- John Baldwin - Mastering
- Andy Spore - Technician (Cartage & Drum Tech)
- Allen Coppock - Technician (Synthesizer Tech)
- Tom Virostek - Technician

=== I Drove All Night (2012 Cassette Single) ===
Credits from the cassette liner.

Production

- Shelley Anderson (Georgetown Masters) - mastering
- Alan Shacklock - engineering, production, and mixing
- The Protomen - engineering, production, and mixing
- John Delucca (Version Industries) - sleeve design and artwork
- Caspar Newbolt (Version Industries) - sleeve design and artwork

The Protomen

- Raul Panther
- Commander B. Hawkins
- Murphy Weller
- Reanimator Lovejoy
- Ringo Segundo
- Sir. Robert Bakker [sic]
- Gambler Kirkdouglas
- Turbo Lover
- Kingsley Youngblood
