= Light Up the Night (Protomen song) =

2009 rock song by the Protomen

Song by the Protomen

from the album Act II: The Father of Death
- Released: September 8, 2009
- Genre: Rock opera, synth-rock, pop, new wave
- Length: 4:04
- Label: Sound Machine Records
- Songwriter: The Protomen
- Producers: The Protomen; Alan Shacklock

Music video
- Light Up The Night - Official Music Video on YouTube

"Light Up the Night" is a song by American rock band the Protomen, appearing as the tenth track on their second studio album, Act II: The Father of Death (2009). Written by the band and produced alongside Alan Shacklock, it serves as the narrative climax of the album's Mega Man–inspired rock opera story.

In 2016, the Protomen released a 16-minute short film serving as the official music video. The film adapts an abridged version of the album's narrative.

Publications and retrospective reviews have described "Light Up the Night" as a standout track from Act II and one of the Protomen's signature songs. The song has been used in video games, television, web series, and stage productions.

Critics have noted the song's arena rock vocal arrangements, fast-paced tempo, and 1980s synth rock influences. Lyrically, it depicts a conversation between the protagonists Joe and Thomas Light as they plan an act of resistance against their city's dictator Albert Wily.

== Short film ==
A screen adaptation was originally pitched to the band at their first Orlando, Florida performance, at Nerdapalooza in 2009, by its writer John Sebastian La Valle. The Protomen produced the short film that is also the song's music video. Released on December 23, 2016, the film stars James Ransone, Steve Olson, and Joel Nagel, and is directed by Matt Sundin and Caspar Newbolt. The sixteen minute film is an abridged adaptation of events from the album. Live action film is interspersed with a graphic novel-style sequence, designed and illustrated by longtime band artist John DeLucca.

The film's plot is framed as a conversation between Thomas and KILROY, who a member of the Protomen. It features an in-universe concert performance of the titular song by the band, who also serve as narrators to the story. Other tracks in the film soundtrack include "The Fall" and excerpts from "Father of Death" and "Breaking Out".

The music video's long‑form narrative format is modeled on 1980s science‑fiction cinema and has been compared to Michael Jackson's "Thriller". Critics have noted visual references to The Terminator, Blade Runner, Escape from New York, and Aliens, as well as to Styx's Kilroy Was Here, particularly in the design of the robot guards and bandmember KILROY.

The film is dedicated to Mike Pandel, known as Triforce Mike. Pandel was an avid Protomen fan who supported their work and the work of many video game artists.

=== Release ===
The soundtrack was released on Sound Machine Records's online store for digital purchase. The film's Blu-ray release includes special features such as deleted scenes, a behind-the-scenes feature, and band and director commentary.

=== Reception ===
Consequence described the short film as a "grim tale of loss in an android-enforced surveillance state." As with the song, its story is described by Reactor as "people trying to fight back against the evil man who is using robots to control humanity". Nintendo Life emphasized the cinematography, writing, and symbolism as "incorporated perfectly". A staff writer for Fandom noted that the music video is "melodramatic and a bit cheesy, but that's why it works. The visuals are pure '80s, shot on location in Manhattan and Brooklyn, with CGI sci-fi effects". Some plot inconsistencies between the original album libretto and truncated plot points are noted by critics due to the short runtime.

== Background and recording ==
On September 2, 2009, "Light Up the Night" was released on the Protomen's website as a teaser for the then-upcoming Act II: The Father of Death. On September 8, 2009, it was officially released as the tenth track on Act II: The Father of Death, written by the band and produced alongside Meat Loaf producer Alan Shacklock. The Protomen has cited the 1984 film Streets of Fire as an influence on Act II, a connection also noted by critics in relation to the "Light Up the Night" music video.

== Plot summary ==
The album's libretto presents the narrative events associated with the song. In the context of the wider concept album, "Light Up the Night" marks a turning point in the narrative, representing humanity's last-ditch effort to resist Dr. Wily's totalitarian regime. The failure to do so has been described as the reason Wily is unchallenged subsequently in the story.

The song depicts a conversation between the album's protagonists, Dr. Light and Joe, following a confrontation with a sniper robot. The two plan to strike back against Dr. Wily's control of the city, with Joe destroying the central transmitter that powers Wily's surveillance network. This distraction is intended to create a brief opening for Light to slip into the city unseen and attempt to assassinate Wily.

Realizing the destroyed sniper robot will soon be noticed, they recognize they have only a short window to act. Light arms Joe with the sniper's helmet and a bag of explosives, sending him towards the tower.

== Music and lyrics ==
Consequence described the song as "bursting with late-'70s Queen-esque flavor ... [with a] fast-paced 4/4 stomp and slammin' guitar riffs". GameSpot noted "triumphant sing-along vocals, driving synths straight out of an '80s training montage, [and] pounding drums". Nashville Scene characterized it as a "Beaver Brown Band-style youth-in-revolt [tune]". In a 2024 retrospective by the Unsung Podcast, the song was called a "pitch-perfect" distillation of '80s hard rock. The podcast specifically highlighted the chorus of power chords, an 'anthemic' guitar break and the use of human choir.

The song's lyrics address the rock opera's central themes of rebellion against tyranny and maintaining hope. Reactor characterized the story as centering on two protagonists who rebel against a figure wielding robotic control over humanity, set within a dystopian, post‑apocalyptic environment tempered by a faint sense of hope. Joe and Light's plan to "destroy the working parts" and create "a beacon of light from a burning screen" is framed by Patrick R. Callahan of Emporia State University as the opera's depiction of "the fall of a city by seeking to work out its salvation through technological means and the many attempts to redeem that city through sacrifice".

Music scholars have identified the latter half of Act II: The Father of Death as an intentional pastiche of '80s synthwave, contrasting with the Western‑influenced material that precedes it. This stylistic juxtaposition has been interpreted as a narrative device that underscores the increasing mechanization of the setting. "Light Up the Night" more specifically incorporates pop rock and synth elements influenced by Journey.

The lyrics have been the subject of deeper literary analysis. Eric A. Sharp of the Ludwig von Mises Institute of Canada analyzes the opening metaphor of the city "sleeping like a soldier trapped inside of an iron lung." He compares this to Václav Havel's concept of a "social auto-totality" totalitarian system that relies on demoralizing the populace into passivity. As Sharp describes, citizens in the narrative "psychologically gave up responsibility for their own destinies". The lyric "the man in the tower controls it all without raising a single fist" illustrates what Sharp calls "automated totalitarianism," a surveillance state enforced by robots that Consequence characterized as a "robot-Gestapo".

== Critical reception and legacy ==
Critics and outlets frequently highlight "Light Up the Night" as a standout track of Act II. The song is a staple of the Protomen's live shows, often mentioned in reviews for their positive audience response.

The Strong called "Light Up the Night" one of the band's signature songs, while Wired, GamesRadar+, Punknews.org, and Live in Limbo have each characterized it as among their strongest and most popular work. The Livewire commented on the song as one of the Protomen's most well-known tracks and noted a lyrical callback within Act III: This City Made Us. The "unstoppable intensity" of "Light Up the Night" was "perfect" according to Derivative Magazine.

While Consequence praised the short for translating the band's rock opera narrative to film and for strong performances by its lead actors, it criticized its narrative pacing for attempting to cover excessive plot elements within the runtime. This included the use of time jumps and a graphic novel sequence to compensate for unshot scenes. Despite these shortcomings when evaluated strictly as a short film, the review deemed these flaws forgivable in the context of a music video.

"Light Up the Night" was named as a level in Ultrakill. It was also referenced twice in World of Warcraft: as the name of an achievement in the Midnight expansion and as one of several Act II: The Father of Death songs named as stages in the Mists of Pandaria expansion.

== Use in media ==
=== Video games ===
"Light Up the Night" appears as a playable track in Rock Band 4. GameSpot called the inclusion of "Light Up the Night" from Act II: The Father of Death a "seriously inspired choice". To promote this release, the Protomen performed the song live with Harmonix developers at PAX Prime 2015.

The song was featured in the reveal trailer for The Wolf Among Us 2.

=== Soundtracks ===
"Light Up the Night" plays during a dance and drift race in season 1, episode 4 ("Any Game in the House") of the web series Video Game High School (2012). RocketJump noted that the Protomen allowed the track to be used free of charge.

A cover of the song performed by the fictional band Dethkrunch appears in the 2024 Peacock series Hysteria! and is included on the show's official soundtrack album. USA Insider noted that the cover amplifies the series' 1980s heavy metal aesthetic as "the main impetus behind the story".

The Protomen released a remastered version of "Light Up the Night" in 2013 as part of the soundtrack of Terminator the Second, a Shakespearean adaption of Terminator 2: Judgment Day. A rendition was also included on the Protomen's live album and Blu-ray video release Live in Nashville (2020).

== Personnel ==
=== Song ===
The liner notes for Act II: The Father of Death do not include individual writing and production credits for tracks.

=== Music video ===
All cast and crew information is taken from the 2016 Blu-ray release.

==== Cast ====
- The Protomen
- James Ransone – Joe
- Steve Olson – Thomas
- Joel Nagle – Albert
- Laine Rettmer – Emily
- Adam M. Griffith – Young Thomas
- Luke Guldan – Cody
- Elan Even – Syd
- Diego Aguirre – Diego
- Aya Sapovalova – Reva
- Ava Eisenson – Rose
- Kilroy Youngblood – KILROY

==== Crew ====
- Matt Sundin – Director, screenplay, editing
- Caspar Newbolt – Director, screenplay, production design
- Kathleen La Valle – Executive producer
- John Sebastian La Valle – Executive producer, screenplay
- Jim Muscarella – Producer
- Allison St. Germain – Wardrobe
- Allison Twardziak – Casting
- Calvin Dykes – Art direction
- Jeffrey Kim – Cinematography
- John DeLucca – Concept artwork
- Joey Ciccoline – Visual effects
- Josiah Newbolt – Visual effects
- Surachai Sutthisasanakul – Sound design
