= The Protomen =

American rock band

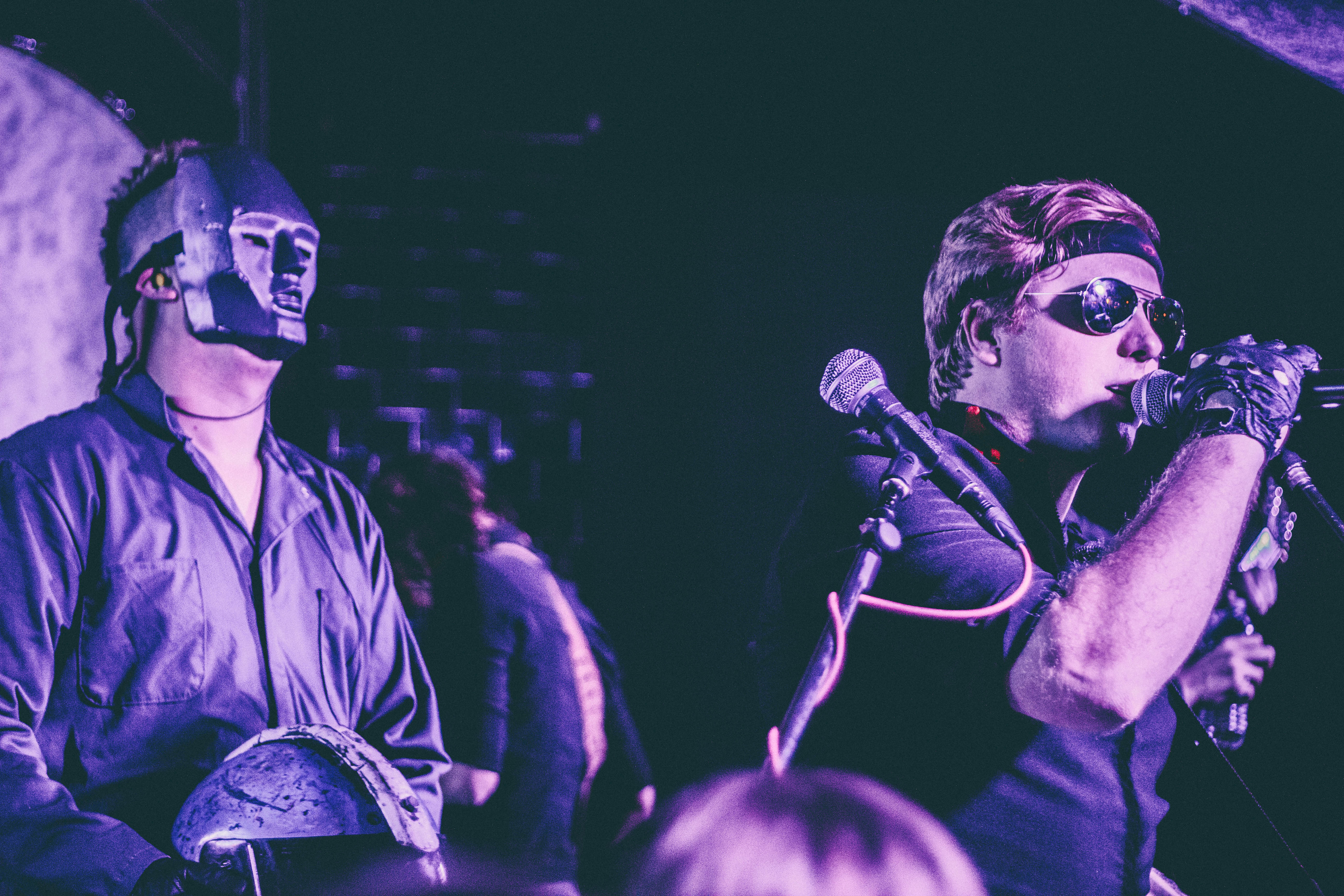
- Two members of the Protomen performing in Austin, Texas

Background information
- Origin: Murfreesboro, Tennessee, US
- Genres: Rock opera; hard rock; progressive rock; rock and roll; geek rock
- Years active: 2003–present
- Label: Sound Machine
- Members: Commander B. Hawkins; Raul Panther III; Murphy Weller; Sir Dr. Robert Bakker; Shock Magnum; Gambler Kirkdouglas; Reanimator Lovejoy; Kilroy
- Website: Official website

The Protomen are an American rock band that composes and performs science fiction rock opera concept albums inspired by pop culture including films and video games. The band was formed in 2003 and is based out of Nashville, Tennessee. They first gained exposure with their 2005 self-titled debut rock opera album The Protomen. The act is one of the most renowned in the video game music and geek rock genres. They were one of Nashville's highest-paid stage acts.

In the Protomen's three-act rock opera, an Orwellian city is ruled by a fascist figure named Dr. Albert Wily, who builds and controls a robot army, with which he has taken over the city. Protagonists attempt to defeat Wily's forces and repeatedly fail. While two acts are tragedies, continuing rebellion against tyranny and remaining hopeful are core themes. Act II: The Father of Death is a prequel to The Protomen and was released in 2009. The third act, Act III: This City Made Us, was released on January 9, 2026 and reached number nine on the Billboard Top Album Sales chart for the end of January. The band tours performing the rock opera in character and only uses aliases while performing. Audience participation and strong audience responses are a significant part of their performances. Critical response to their music and performances is mostly positive. The Protomen tour extensively and are known for performing at festivals and headlining fan conventions, especially MAGFest.

Outside of the Protomen's rock opera, they have released two cover albums to positive responses, and have collaborated with other artists for albums, songs, and performances. They released the single "Built to Last" (2013) as part of Capcom's anniversary album for the Mega Man franchise, which their rock opera is inspired by.

== History ==
The Protomen formed in Murfreesboro, Tennessee. Their name comes from one of the main characters in the Capcom video game franchise Mega Man: Proto Man. The band is composed mostly of Middle Tennessee State University (MTSU) recording program graduates, and originated in order to meet class deadlines and the need to record for their grades. Their first live performance was in April 2004. Most of the band had graduated and moved to Nashville by 2005.

In a 2009 interview, lead vocalist Panther stated, "We basically gathered up all of our good friends from the local rock bands of Murfreesboro, tied ourselves together, and tried to walk. And somehow it worked. At the time, we noticed a void in rock and roll. A hole that could only really be filled with grown men and women painting up like robots and playing some fierce and furious rock music based on a 1980s video game. We were fairly certain no one else was going to fill that hole. But, by God, it's filled now. You can thank us later."

The band has strong ties to the Murfreesboro and Nashville independent music scene, and some members perform with several bands.

=== The Protomen ===
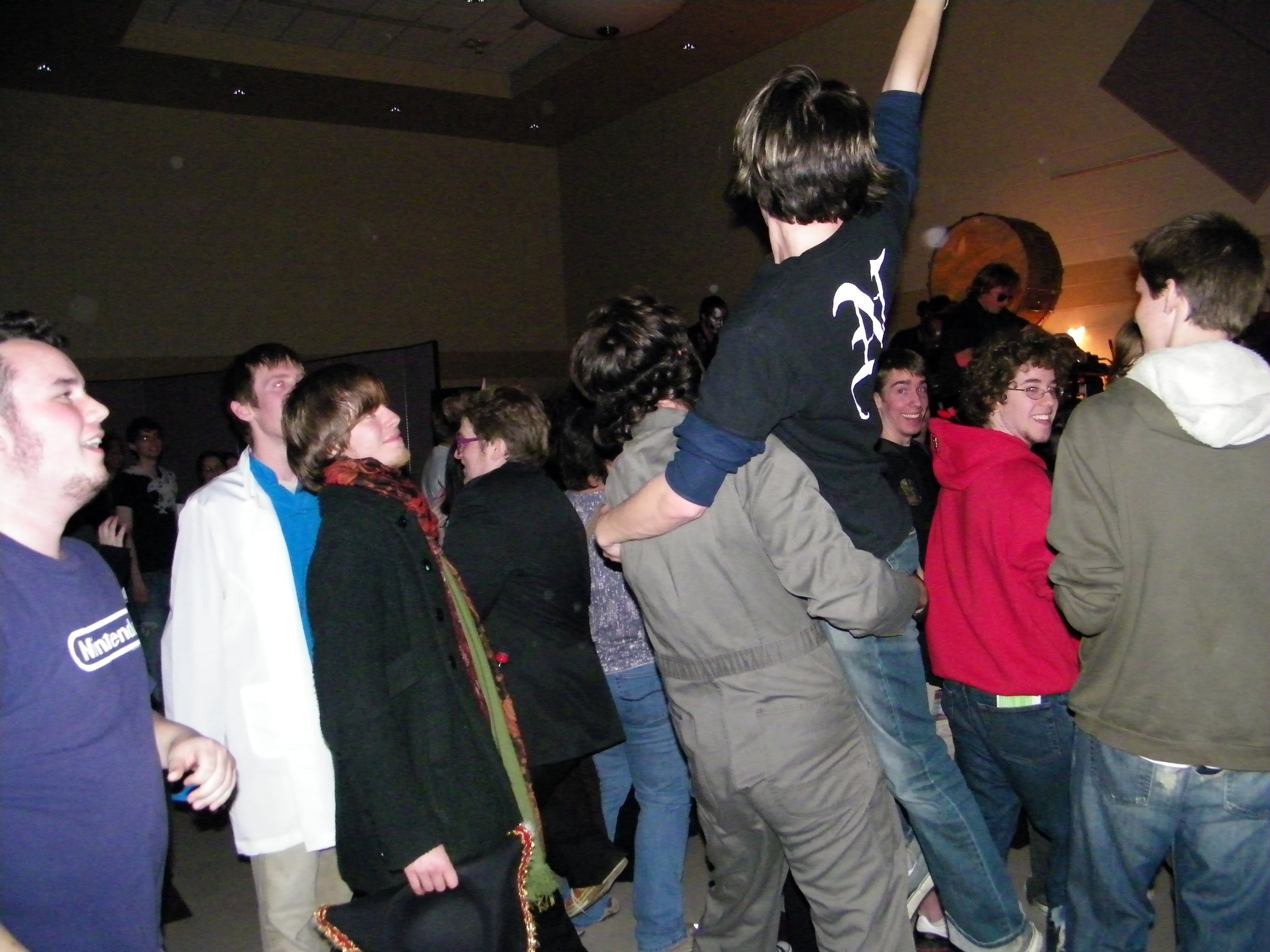
Kilroy carries a fan onstage to perform with the Protomen in 2009.

In the band's first album, Dr. Wily is represented as an Orwellian ruler over a dystopic city, full of humans who are too scared to stand up to his control. Dr. Light creates a "perfect man, an unbeatable machine", Protoman, to fight to free the city, but Protoman is destroyed by the overwhelming power of Wily's armies. Defeated and despairing, Light creates a second son, Megaman, whom he attempts to dissuade from battle. Megaman runs away from home and confronts his brother in an apocalyptic concluding battle. The album has been described by the band as "the sound of the end of the world" and straddles the line between chiptune and hard rock, with heavier focus on distorted 8-bit synthesizers and electronic instrumentation.

Band member Commander B. Hawkins has stated that the album "was made specifically to go against everything our recording teachers and fellow students were trying to feed us about making everything sound pristine and 'perfect'". The album was recorded over two years in various Murfreesboro studios, using analog rather than digital production techniques. "Due Vendetta", the group's first recorded track, was completed in April 2003. The album was produced by then-Protomen member Heath Who Hath No Name. The first CD pressing was 94 CDs, with the cover screen printed and the libretto booklet stapled by hand.

=== Act II: The Father of Death ===
New logo released in support of the Protomen's second album.

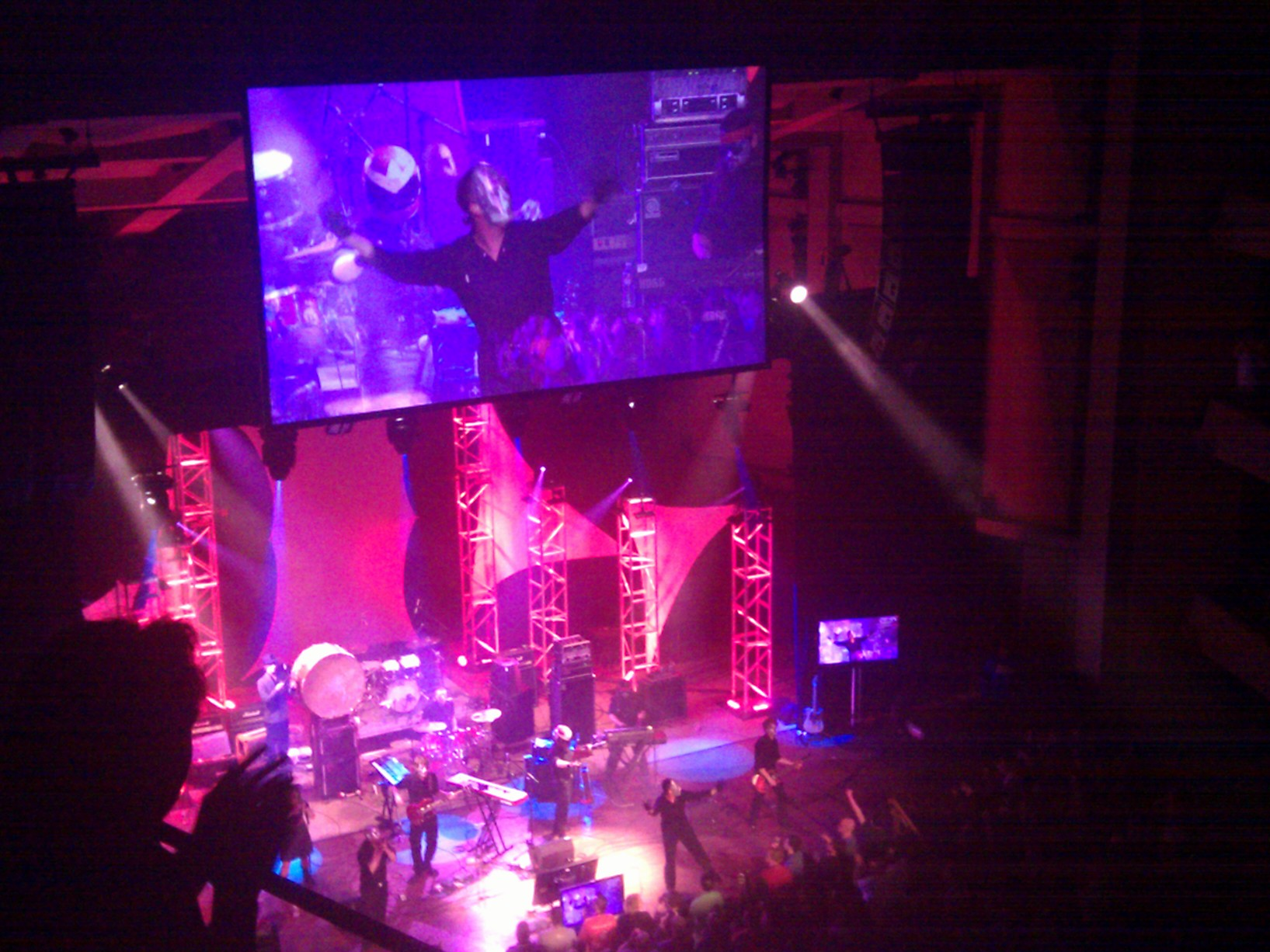
The Protomen in concert in Seattle September 2010.

For the band's second album the group, working with Meat Loaf producer Alan Shacklock, devised a prequel storyline to their first album. The second act details the rise of Albert Wily to power, the rivalry between himself and Thomas Light, and the tragic events which brought the City under Wily's control. The band stated that Act II was designed to sound cleaner, reflecting a time "before the bomb dropped". Accordingly, the second album reflects a much broader range of musical styles and more lyrical instrumentation, embracing references from Ennio Morricone to Bruce Springsteen to Shacklock's own Babe Ruth. The album was mastered by Richard Dodd. The band debuted a new logo by Version Industries. A vinyl version of the album was released in spring 2018 and reached number 24 on the vinyl albums Billboard chart. Described by The Strong as one of the band's signature songs, "Light Up the Night" was released as part of Act II: The Father of Death.

=== The Protomen Present: A Night of Queen ===
The Protomen are known for performing, along with their original rock opera, a variety of 1970s and 1980s cover songs in their live performances, typically related to the band's preferred motifs of heroism, struggle, and self-determination. On December 10, 2010, the Protomen performed along with Nashville band Evil Bebos for the latter band's farewell concert. Evil Bebos played a set entirely composed of Black Sabbath cover songs, while the Protomen in kind performed a set of Queen covers. The live performance was recorded and mastered, and on April 19, 2012, the Protomen announced through their website and mailing list that the resulting live album, titled The Protomen Present: A Night of Queen, would be released and was available for pre-order. Though set for a June 1, 2012, release, the album shipped early to those who pre-ordered it.

=== The Cover Up: Original Soundtrack from the Motion Picture ===
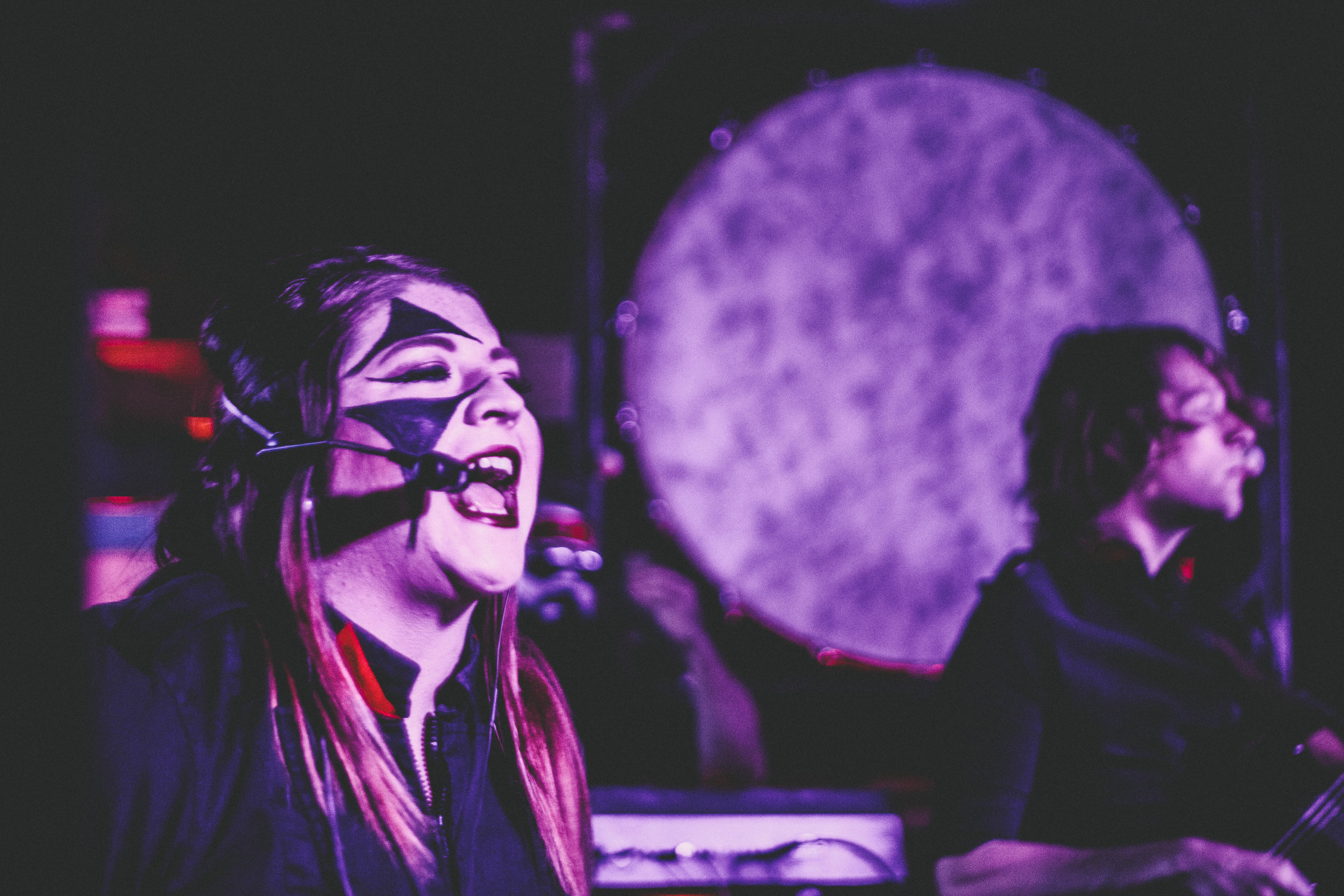
Vocalist the Gambler singing in 2014. Guitarist and vocalist Turbo Lover in the background.

In November 2010, while performing at InDisFest in Atlanta, GA, the band announced their intention to formally record an album of cover songs. Production on the album began in February 2011 with producer Alan Shacklock, the band's second collaboration with the producer following Act II. By June 2014, the band announced that a downloadable EP would be made available to attendees of their Warped Tour 2014 performances to promote the upcoming full-length album, titled The Cover Up. The EP was released via a download code printed on a faux movie ticket stub for The Cover Up, referencing a non-existent film, packaged in a laminate sleeve attached to a lanyard commemorating the Warped Tour. The full-length album was released on January 23, 2015, to attendees of MAGFest 13, where the Protomen were performing. The following morning, on January 24, the album was made available for pre-order to the general public through the band's website.

The album is styled with a hidden narrative, being the surviving soundtrack to a banned movie within the universe of the band's dystopian three-act rock opera tragedy, which is influenced by "Reagan-era media" like Phil Collins's "In the Air Tonight", one of the cover album's tracks. The album's cover art depicts a human hand shushing a damaged humanoid robot with its mouth removed. The back depicts a similar image with a crying human woman being shushed by a robot hand. A note on the interior says that the full theatrical release of The Cover Up was halted by cast and crew going missing after the initial limited release and that the soundtrack is the only part that survived, declaring "this soundtrack may be the only remaining glimpse of a work of fiction that tread so close to the truth that its creators must have ultimately paid a terrible price."

The Protomen frequently cover "In the Air Tonight" live to positive responses. Nashville Scene enthused: "They nailed that one, iconic drum fill and all." The cover of "In the Air Tonight" was later featured in the third season of Cobra Kai in 2021 and as a result was the 7th top song on Shazam for the first half of 2021. Use of the cover was positively received. Radio Times said "'In The Air Tonight' never sounded so good". The cover made Cobra Kai "so true to its source material" The Karate Kid (1984) according to Entertainment Voice. While Variety panned the use of music in Cobra Kai as "overdos[ing] on '80s kitsch", reporters Lily Moayeri and Shirley Halperin positively reviewed the use of the Protomen's "In the Air Tonight". Collider found the mix of styles eclectic but successful, saying "The fact that songs like 'In the Air Tonight' by The Protomen and 'Crank It Up' by Joey Valence & Brae can exist in the same soundtrack is beyond wild. Some wonderful needle drops here." The same cover was licensed for a Hugo Boss underwear marketing campaign featuring David Beckham that ran in movie theaters as well as streaming services like Amazon Prime in 2025.

=== Act III: This City Made Us ===
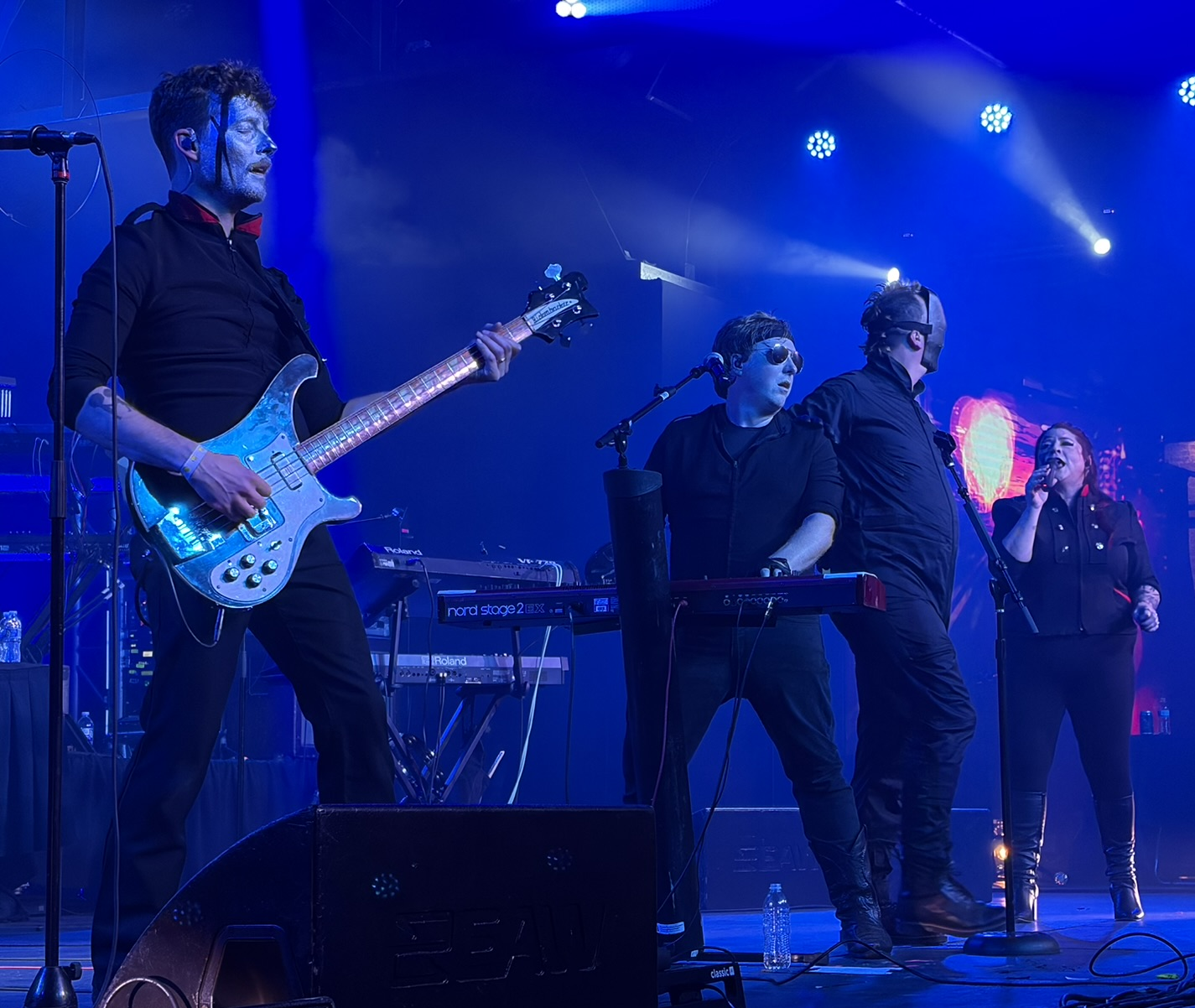
Members of the Protomen performing at the release show for Act III in Nashville.

On Friday, October 3, 2025, the Protomen began the surprise release of their third album on Bandcamp. Beginning with the first two tracks, The Calm and Hold Back The Night, the band added new tracks weekly for the next "couple of months". The album was released fully on January 9, 2026.

Act III was the most pre-ordered album on Bandcamp in 2025, as well as one of the top ten bestselling albums and the number one best selling compact disc on the site for the year. The album debuted at number nine on the Billboard Top Album Sales chart for the end of January. For the same time period, the Protomen charted at number four on Emerging Artists.

== Artistry ==
=== Musical style and influences ===
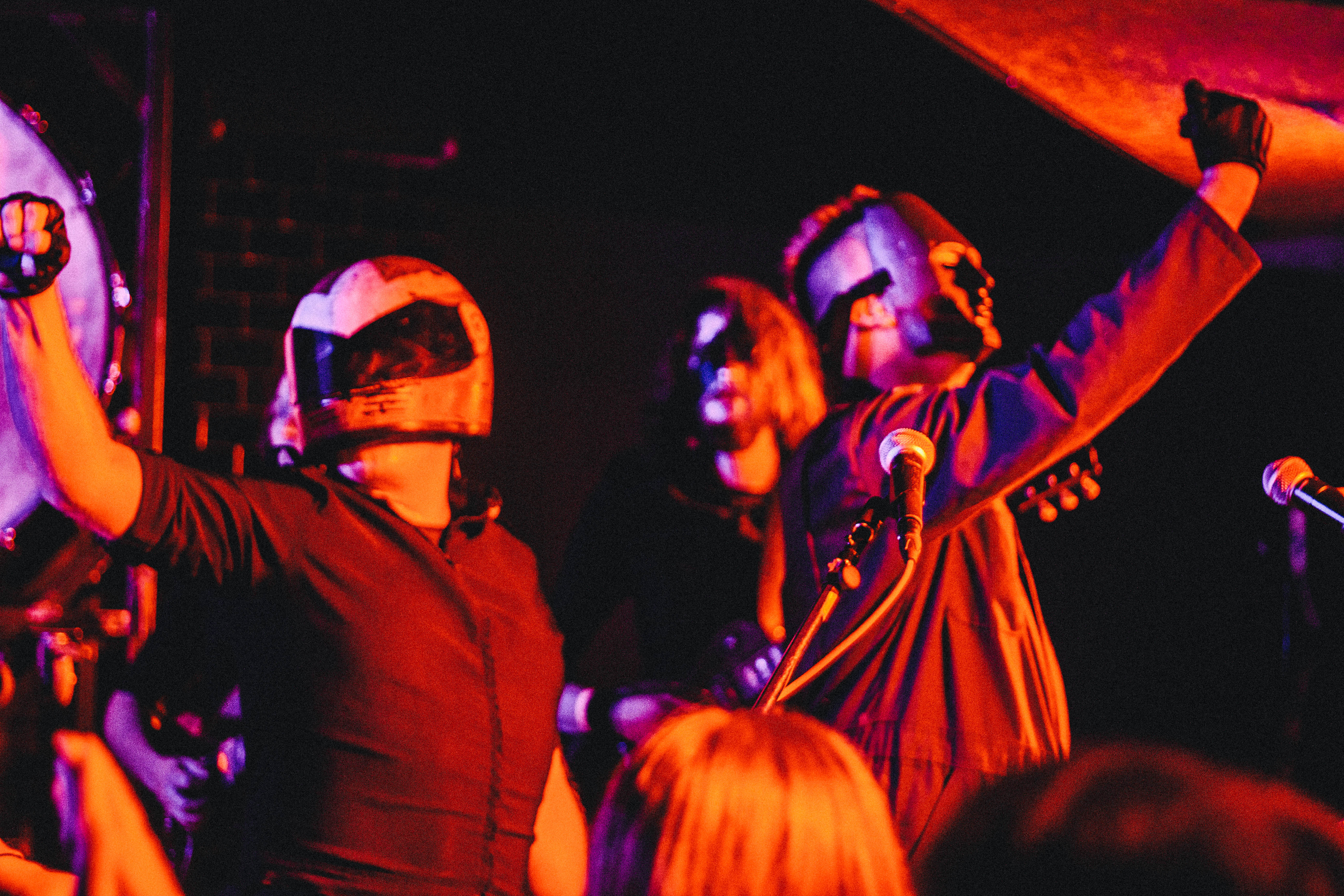
Band members performing as the robot characters Protoman and Kilroy in 2014.

The Protomen's sound has been called "science fiction rock", a "driving, theatrical offshoot of rock 'n' roll" with "a little twist of sci-fi and video game effects" and the "fury of the hard rock hits of the 1980s, and the over the-top 1970s prog". Their conventional style labels include rock, hard rock, progressive, progressive rock, rock and roll, and geek rock. Their albums are released on Bandcamp with the tags rock, rock and roll, and rock opera. Evoking the 1980s in the United States and playing on 1980s nostalgia is also a core component of their sound, visuals, and subject matter. Micheal B. Raines of Georgia State University says the Protomen are "possibly one of the earliest" notable examples of intentionally evoking 1980s nostalgia in media.

The Protomen combine a wide number of instruments and processes like synth, distortion, violins, choirs, brass, acoustic guitar, and genres or formats including hair metal, arena rock, Americana, rockabilly, power ballads, and funeral marches. Critics describe the sound as feeling large or overwhelming, epic, passionate, operatic, theatrical, cinematic, and intense.

Their musical style appears to some critics to bridge mainstream music and underground geek rock genres. The Protomen can also be considered glam rock and filk.

Reporting disagrees about whether the Protomen are part of video game-related music genres such as the Nintendocore genre. A couple sources use the label Nintendocore, but critics like metal database The Circle Pit say the Protomen are "distinct progress away from the trite and listless cliché of Nintendocore, towards something more resonant and fulfilling." Consequence of Sound classifies the Protomen as nerd rock (also called geek rock), which Consequence describes as most informed by Devo and the punk, rock, and new wave genres, but excludes nerdcore (sometimes equated to Nintendocore).

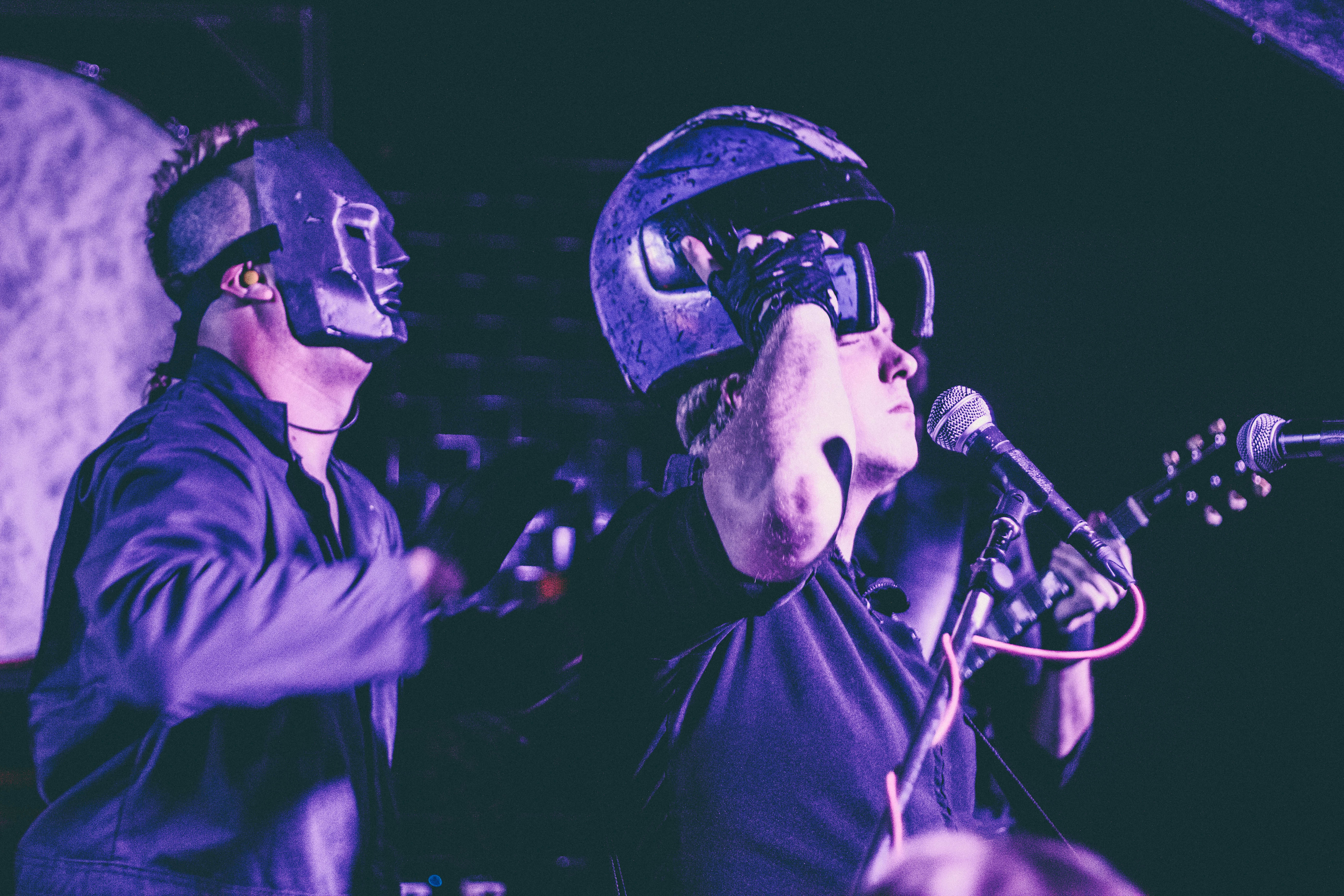
Kilroy helps Panther don Megaman's helmet in 2014. Helmets and masks are equipped with microphones.

One blogger comparing video game cover bands in 2010 said: "they aren't a video game band in any way, shape, or form. [...] it's not a bad story. It's just that it's not fucking Mega Man′s story, which means they aren't a fucking Mega Man band." Their music and lyrics reinterpret the music, setting, characters, and plots in Mega Man games, rather than performing them exactly as they are in the games. Aside from a short tune in one song, "there are no direct musical references to the Mega Man series[...] Someone who isn't entirely familiar with Mega Man can enjoy the tracks". Mega Man's parent company Capcom concurs: "While there are a few nods to the in-game music of Mega Man, most of [the Protomen's] recorded work is closer to serious rock-opera rather than the 8-bit, chip-tune style of other videogame-inspired artists. In fact, if you don't listen closely, you could easily miss the Mega Man influence entirely". Nashville Scene reported "You don't need to know or care anything about [the Mega Man game series]". GameDaily reporter Zak Wojnar explained being a Protomen fan but not a Mega Man fan as: "I'm not a Mega Man enthusiast in the slightest. The recent announcement of Mega Man: Dual Override did absolutely nothing for me. [...] I do love The Protomen, but that's kind of a whole other thing."

The Protomen do not consider themselves a video game band but recognize they are associated with the genre. In an early interview with The Tennessean the lead vocalist, who goes by Raul Panther III while performing, said: "It never really crossed our collective minds to play video game covers. Truthfully, we didn't even know there was this huge wave of video game cover bands until after we started the band and became irrevocably tied to them[...] Honestly, it's just not for us. We love the music from the games and couldn't hope to really add anything by just playing them on guitars."

The group has cited the influence of "artists like Syd Mead, films like Eddie and the Cruisers and Streets of Fire, books like 1984 and Atlas Shrugged... those are the pretty obvious ones you can pull out of Acts I and II. But what you might not realize is that we own every Ernest movie ever made. And we watch them all the time." The band draws inspiration from diverse sources, including Sergio Leone's films, the song "The Mexican" and musical groups Radiohead, Styx, Toto, Queen and Alabama.

=== Concepts and themes ===
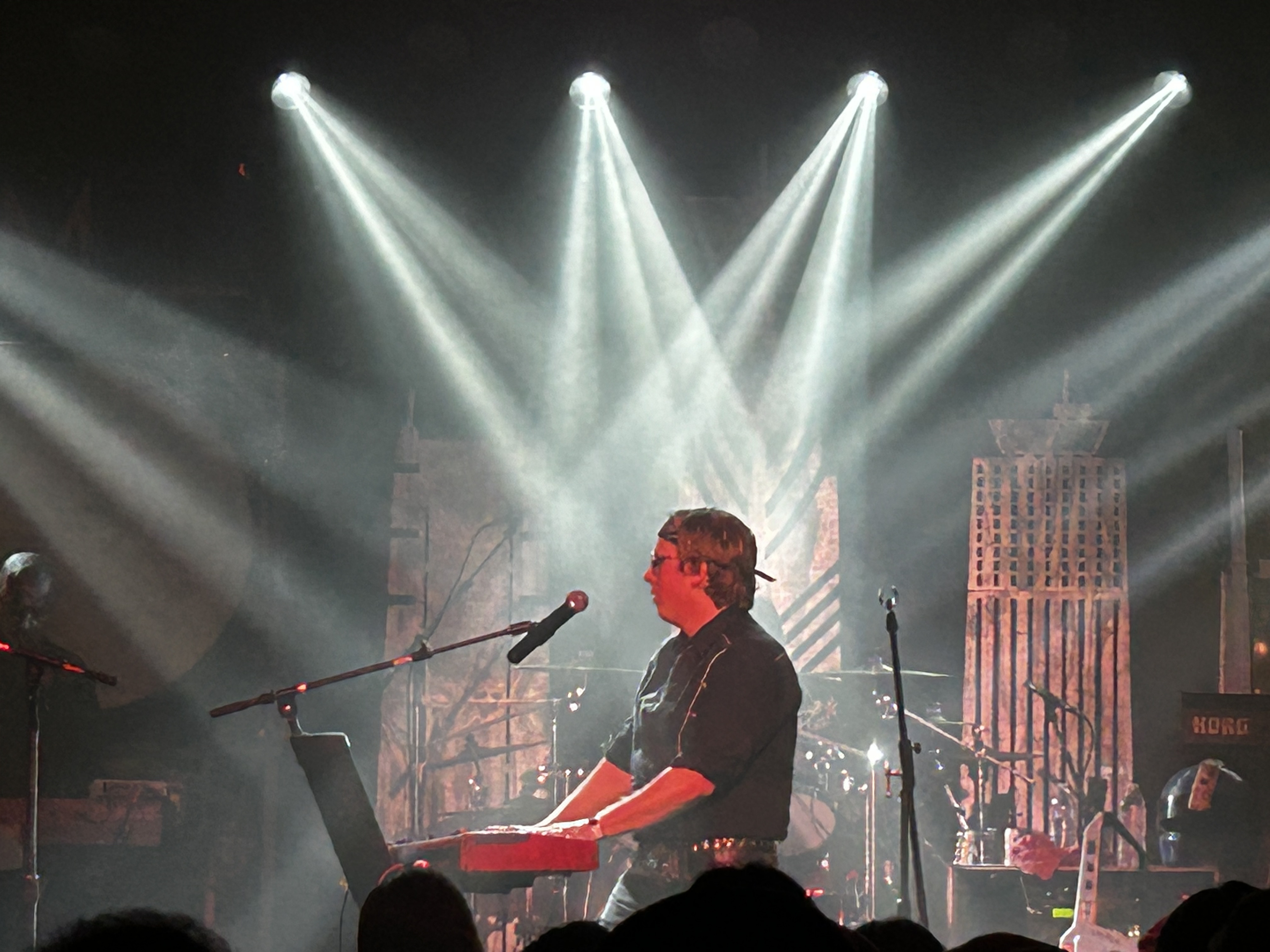
Stages are set with props and band members wear costumes.

In the Protomen's three-act rock opera, an Orwellian city is ruled by a fascist figure named Dr. Albert Wily, who builds and controls a robot army, with which he has taken over the city. Rebel elements attempt to sabotage Wily's robot enforcers or propaganda mechanisms and ultimately fail. While two acts are tragedies, continuing rebellion against tyranny and remaining hopeful are core themes. The Protomen (referred to as Act I) follows Wily's former colleague Dr. Thomas Light, who builds two sentient robot sons that challenge Wily and meet tragedy when they fail. Prequel Act II: The Father of Death depicts the breakdown between Wily and Light, the first rebellions against Wily's rule, and the resulting tragedy. Act III: This City Made Us is the aftermath of Act I. Physical copies of CD albums are accompanied with printed libretto in liner note booklets that include narration and stage direction not present in the songs. The multi-media approach has been likened to polymorphic content strategy.

The setting is a science fiction dystopia in the post-apocalypse, where humans have been relieved of grueling manual labor by advanced robotics at the cost of self-expression and freedom from surveillance. Many thoughts, music, and movies are banned and city residents regularly go missing. Characters experience interpersonal loss as a consequence of the totalitarian surveillance state enforced by the robots. Consequence of Sound described the role of the machines as "the robot-Gestapo" and the setting as a "cyberpunk Western".

One of the more poetic moments on the record is the way in which death is symbolized; a glorious choir of unrepentantly positive voices proclaiming "there will be light" ultimately cut short mid-proclamation; martyrdom in the face of unrelenting tyranny.

— The Deli Magazine (2009)

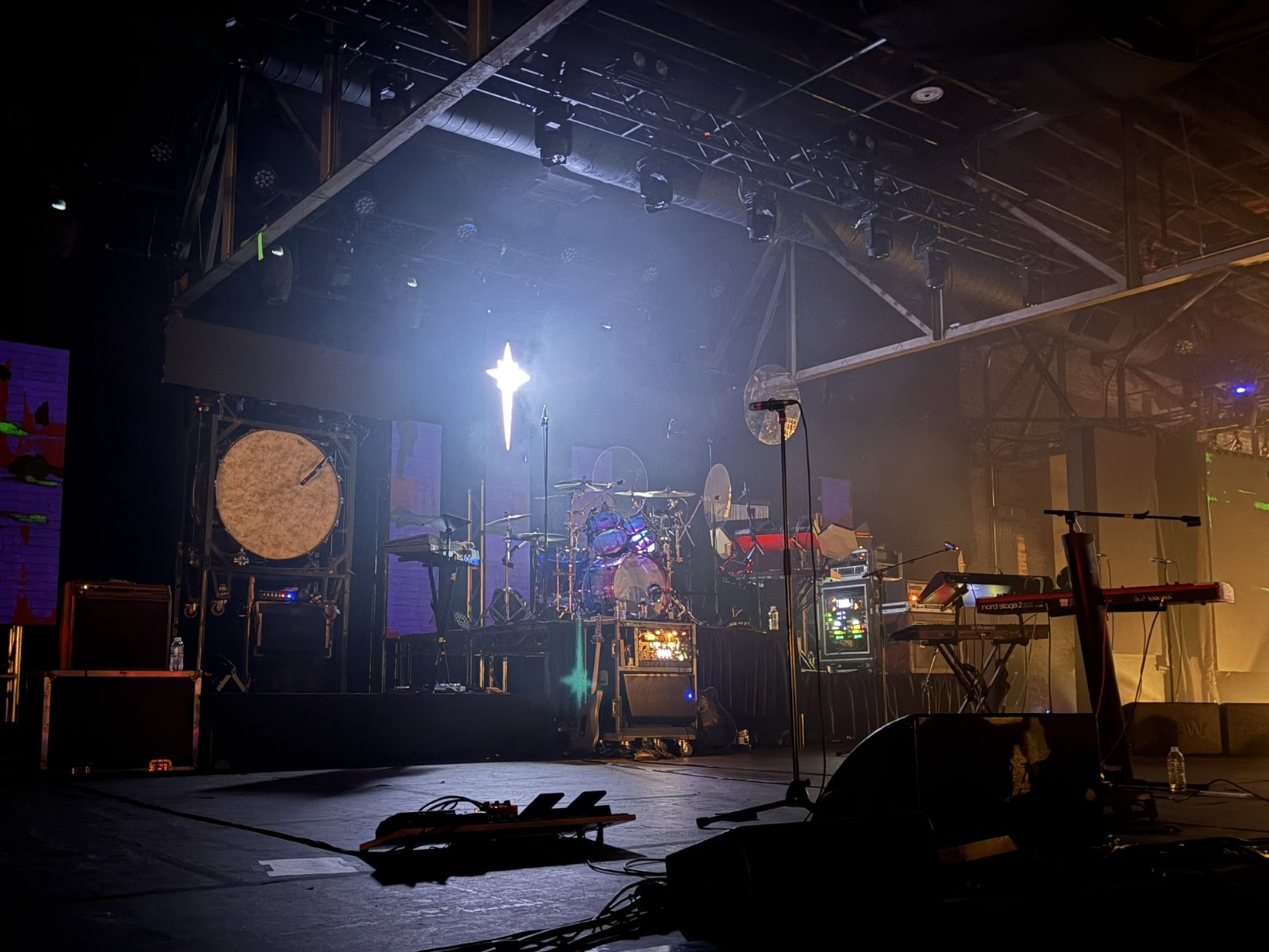
The Protomen stage set in 2026.

Commentary on savior figures, martyrs, and heroism is central to the narrative, especially the role of technology in the struggle for salvation. Patrick R. Callahan of Emporia State University describes the depiction as "the fall of a city by seeking to work out its salvation through technological means and the many attempts to redeem that city through sacrifice". Ion Magazine called it "Jesus Christ Superstar sung by 'Thunder Road'-era Springsteen... if Christ was actually Mega Man." Live shows open with an invocation from a band member playing a robot character named Kilroy (stylized K.I.L.R.O.Y.), recounted by WIRED thusly: "Kilroy nods gravely, extends his arms like a preacher. 'Your response is compliant,' he tells the [cheering] crowd, robot-serious. And then: 'We are your salvation. We are your hope. We are — the Protomen.'" Pseudonymous band member Commander B. Hawkins explained, "the religious overtones probably stem from the fact that the Bible is one of the best tales of good vs evil ever."

External videos
- Audience chanting propaganda slogans during "Will of One" live
- The Gambler Kirkdouglas in the audience during crowd chants
- Protoman interacting with the audience

Entertainment website Nerdy Show Network described the Protomen's performances as a "mythos that fans can be a part of". Performances are framed as battles rallying audience members to fight for their freedom, and as the narrative progresses the audience participation becomes as a disaffected crowd who will not sacrifice their relative peace to fight for freedom alongside lone heroes. The audience role even calls for the death of heroes, leading to the hero's doom. Competing voices and guitars illustrate the struggle musically. The audience role involves clapping in time to the hero's heartbeat, call and response, chanting propaganda slogans, singing the chorus mourning fallen heroes or pressuring a hero into action the hero is uncertain about, and eagerly interviewing the successful villain as part of the press corps. Lead vocalist Panther has said about the role the crowd chorus plays in their music: "Our overarching message is that people really need to think for themselves and not follow a crowd."

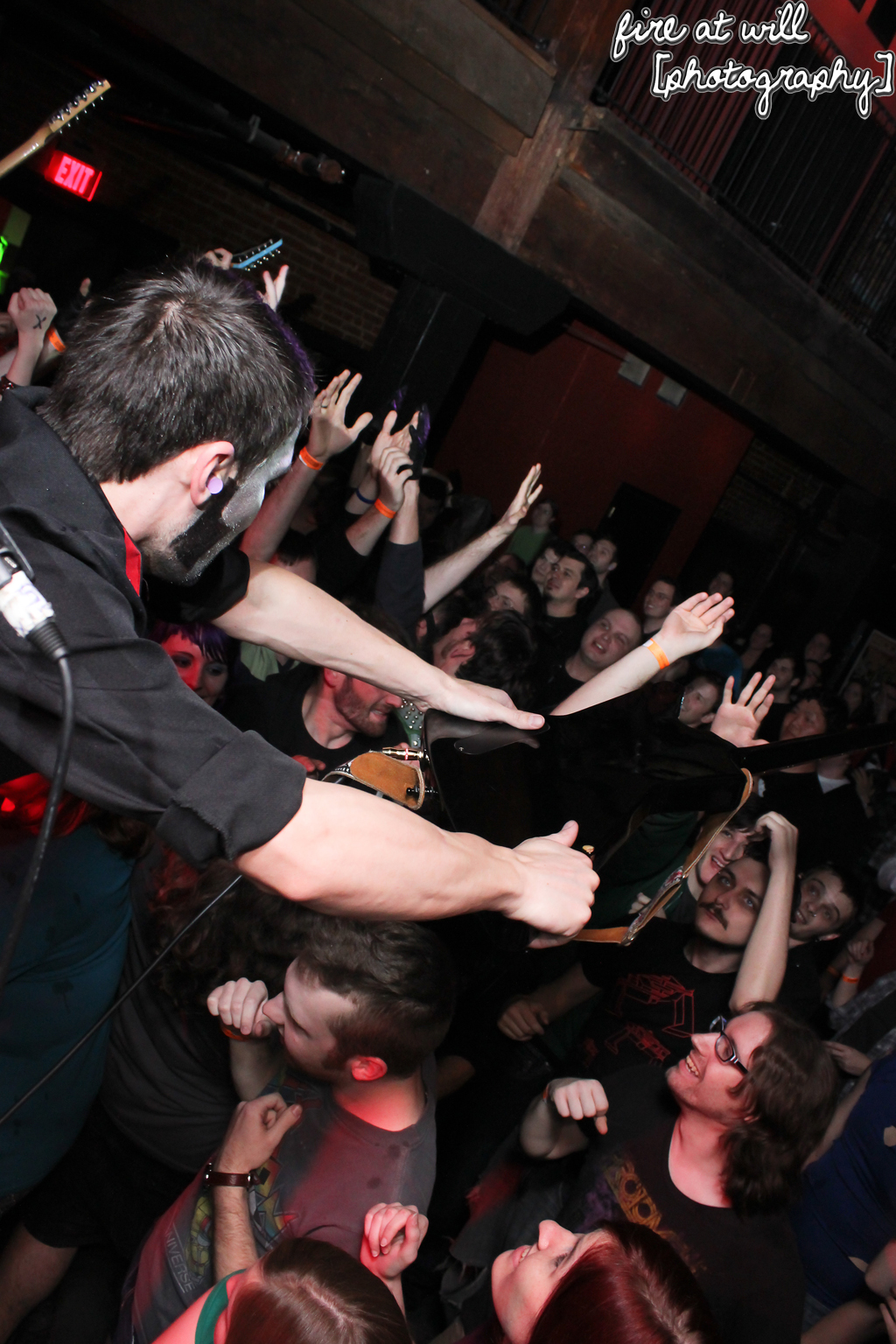
Former guitarist Ringo Segundo extends his guitar into the crowd to invite them to strum the strings.

Previous experience with the Protomen isn't required to participate because the band choreographs and prompts audience participation. One gaming publication reported: "not only were existing fans singing along, but also everyone in the crowd that had yet to experience The Protomen". One blogger recalled the band diffusing unscripted audience interaction: "[The audience is] also discouraged from participating in non-sanctioned ways. If they clap at the wrong time, the Protomen make motions for the audience to stop. The band is directing the interaction of the audience with the show." Some audiences mosh and crowd surf audience members or band members, who continue to perform while surfing.

The relationship between the crowd and heroes in the Protomen's music and performances has explicit parallels to Nineteen Eighty-Four by George Orwell. Video game reporter Benjamin Lamoreux explained, "Both stories have a very pronounced theme that the common man (the "proles" of 1984 and the humans of The Protomen) need to stand up and fight. It's not enough for a Hero (be it a member of the Ingsoc society or mechanical savior) to take a stand." Eric A. Sharp with the Ludwig von Mises Institute of Canada says the dictator Wily turning the public against the protagonist Light mirrors the role of Emmanuel Goldstein in Nineteen Eighty-Four. The Act I crowd refrain "we are the dead" is a phrase from Nineteen Eighty-Four prophesying the characters' doom that is reinforced by the ubiquitous propaganda telescreens.

You were the dead, theirs was the future. But you could share in that future if you kept alive the mind as they kept alive the body, and passed on the secret doctrine that two plus two make four.

'We are the dead,' he said.

'We are the dead,' echoed Julia dutifully.

'You are the dead,' said an iron voice behind them.

— George Orwell, Nineteen Eighty-Four, page 203

In The Protomen, it reinforces the crowd's lack of will to free themselves.

There was not a man among them who would let himself be heard. But from the crowd, from the collective fear, arose these broken words:
We are the dead.
We are the dead.

— Narrator and Human Choir, in The Protomen, I: Hope Rides Alone

Sharp describes the inaction of the crowd as a function of hero worship from lack of agency under totalitarianism: "There was never an organized resistance to Wily's totalitarian society because once the people were deprived of a sense of responsibility for their own survival – when they no longer needed to work to live, they also psychologically gave up responsibility for their own destinies. They came to expect someone else to take care of all of their needs, leading to hero worship." Sharp calls Wily's city a "social auto-totality", a phrase coined by Václav Havel for a totalitarian system that relies on demoralizing the populace.

Science fiction tropes underpin the rock opera, such as the character of Wily, who is a mad scientist. The rock opera is inspired by the first six NES Mega Man games and the franchise's characters, who are primarily robots named after music genres such as blues and rock and roll. The Mega Man franchise has canonical storylines that the Protomen rock opera plot diverges from significantly. Many characters have names and roles from Mega Man, but the setting is a dark reimagining of the game's underlying world. Video game and science fiction inspired sound effects and electronic motifs crossover with the hard rock and rock and roll musical style, causing some critics to dub the group's style "science fiction rock." Because the musical style is not typical of video game music such as chiptune and the plot of the rock opera is not an exact retelling of the plot of any part of the Mega Man franchise, reporting and critics disagree about whether the Protomen should be considered video game music.

Additionally, when the band plays live, the band dons costumes and act out the narrative of the albums live on stage.

== Reception ==
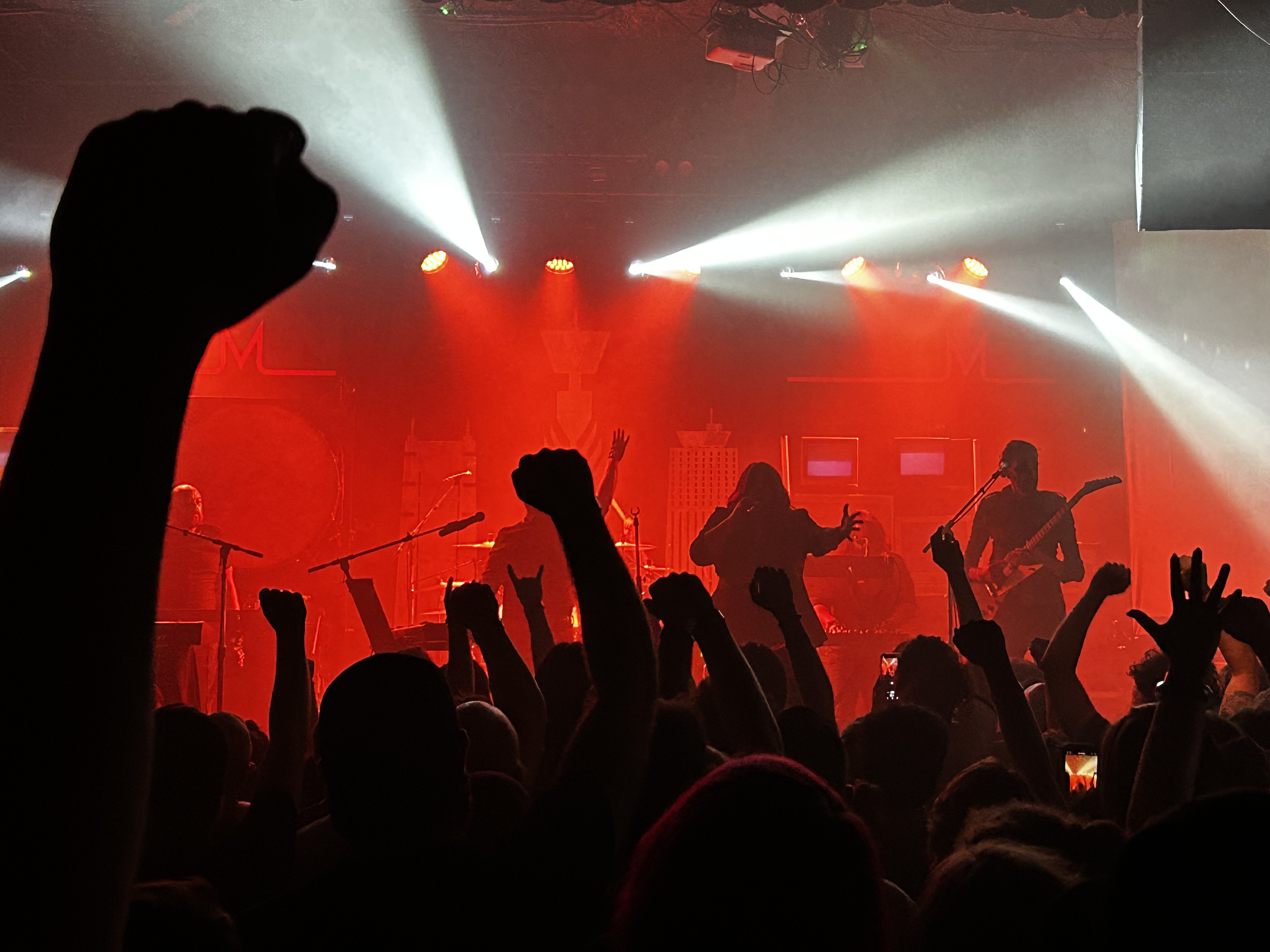
Audience at the Protomen's twentieth anniversary concert.

Critical reception of the Protomen's music, stage show, and multimedia narrative is mostly positive. The Protomen are a "dystopian rock opera sensation" according to Consequence of Sound. "The Protomen are good. They're really good. They're cover-Queen-with-a-nine-person-band-and-get-away-with-it good", says WIRED. Asheville Citizen-Times called the band a "pop culture tour de force". The Commercial Appeal said "you could do no better" than The Protomen for "truly inspired, epic rock". In 2007, two years after the release of their debut album, they were one of Nashville's highest-paid stage acts.

In the video game music and geek rock genres, they are considered legendary. The Tennessean reported that The Protomen are nationally and internationally renowned, but in alternative audiences rather than mainstream rock music listeners. "When it comes to Nashville acts earning national attention, robot-rock crew The Protomen are in a different league entirely. Instead of spreads in Rolling Stone and slots at Lollapalooza, The Protomen get ink in Electronic Gaming Monthly and play for crowds at Comicon." The band "attract[s] a national geek-friendly fanbase and cultish throng of local followers." Nashville Scene concurs: the band is "one of geek culture's biggest rock acts." Video game music publication VGMO introduced them with, "Do they even need an introduction?" They were number one on The Mary Sue's list of bands that deserve mainstream attention.

Janky Smooth's positive review said, "There isn't anyone else touring today quite like The Protomen; their albums are epic in scale and concept and as a live band they sound absolutely massive. [...] On display is a true, palpable love for their art that makes it seem as if the vast majority of bands you'd see on this side of town any given night are doing it for the wrong reasons." Tor.com contributor Richard Fife explained his positive response: "I was blown away. The music had a technical complexity to it that really surprised me, and a Rock Opera feeling that makes me think [of] Meatloaf, Trans-Siberian Orchestra and GWAR". The live performance Fife attended had an energetic audience response. "The crowd was almost at a fever pitch" and "[b]y the end of the set, the audience was so excited that they were literally shaking the floor. As the band left, a chant of 'Protomen!' was taken up, which accelerated of its own accord until the band came out for an encore". Strong audience responses are typical during and outside performances. Columbia, South Carolina's Free Times reported, "one band was always referred to in reverent tones on music-themed Internet message boards[...] And that band — Nashville's The Protomen — also put on one hell of a live show, replete with a chorus, costumes and all manner of craziness." RVA Magazine reported, "You wouldn't expect it to launch Plaza Bowl into the kind of frenzy that it did, but sure enough, not a single attendee was standing still. Energy was the word of the night, and the robots from Nashville brought it in spades." Nashville Scene recounted, "They cultivate a kind of energy and fan response that borders on 'frothing.'"

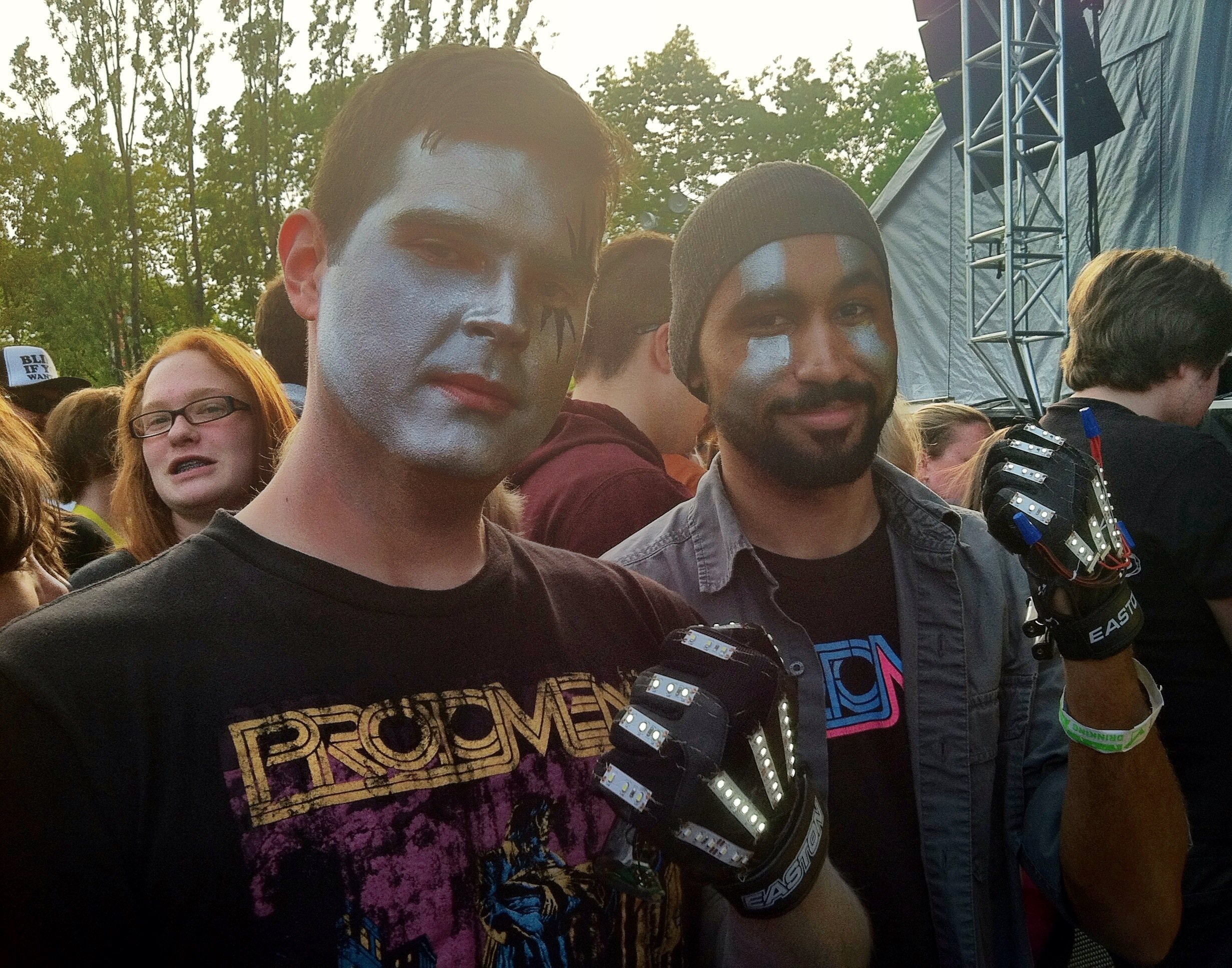
Many fans wear costumes and makeup for audience participation.

Critics highlight the audience participation in performances especially. ABQ-Live said the crowd chanting propaganda slogans was a chilling, stand-out moment. "The band played the crowd like an instrument, a perfect fit for [the Protomen's] theatrical presence. The show seemed choreographed like a tightly blocked play", according to Live In Limbo. Video game reporter Eric Henn said of the show: "Their playing, using it as a call to arms like they do, raises something almost primal in the listener. It really did make me want to stand and fight with them, and I wasn't the only one - the energy in that room was intense, from the band and the audience alike." Benjamin Webb for Australian-based gaming site Capsule Computers said: "they get the crowd involved and because of that, you're connected to not only the performance, but also to the overarching story behind the show. [...] not only were existing fans singing along, but also everyone in the crowd that had yet to experience The Protomen".

The intense energy cultivated for performances can blindside some unsuspecting attendees. The Baltimore Sun said a "bunch of wide-eyed county kids rolled into the gallery" who "came in terrified but left OK". A WTBU reporter in 2012 was "[blown] away again" by the Protomen audience: "It was the hardest I’ve seen nerdy people rock out probably ever." "Seeing the band live for the first time can feel like attending a political rally — or a very hard-rocking cult," concluded WIRED. The Protomen had a reputation for being difficult to record without professional audio equipment as well as blowing electrical fuses at venues due to the large amount of music equipment onstage. Brian Clevinger emphasized: "there's a reason why any YouTube of their live performances sounds like garbage. We do not yet have the technology to capture that level of HOLY SHIT. [...] their live show takes things to another level."

Many reviewers say that a rock opera based on a video game can be difficult to take seriously. One Winnipeg paper promoted an upcoming show humorously: "Mega Man opera. Help save Winnipeg from the evil Dr. Wily. Tennessee weirdos The Protomen play the Pyramid Cabaret tonight. The band writes rock operas based on the Mega Man video games series." The Protomen convince audiences with technically impressive and fun performances—what Asheville Citizen-Times called their "tight rhythms and enigmatic stage presence". MetalSucks said, "Rock operas may have gone the way of Meat Loaf's weight but this Nashville chorus of dork defenders keeps the faith alive with their unironic love of video games, Freddie Mercury, and keytars. No '80s synth band has ever made the un-coolest of instruments worthy of screaming fans and sweaty bodies as much as Protomen." Las Vegas Review-Journal's positive review said the Protomen "sound like something that would be the soundtrack to one of those ubiquitous montage scenes in various '80s flicks where the soon-to-be hero is training for his final challenge" and that despite the fact that basing the lyrics off of a video game may not "make total sense", "[e]ither way, you'll be inspired to greatness - or at least some serious beer drinking - in this band's presence." In response to 2009 Bonnaroo Music Festival including the Protomen, Orlando Sentinel said that the band's "moody rock operas about the Mega Man video game series are so deeply geeky that it's amazing they've played anywhere outside their mom's basement (much less this year's Bonnaroo festival)."

Despite many skeptical but ultimately positive responses, Something Awful published a negative general review of the band and its work: "The Protomen, a band that — and I am entirely serious — has thus far written two concept albums that take place in and tell the story of the Mega Man universe. This is literally the only thing that makes The Protomen notable. The music is neither particularly good nor especially terrible". The Protomen's rock opera does not actually recount the canonical story of the Mega Man franchise. Something Awful concludes that the Protomen are "terrible" but concedes "there's a lot more terrible [video game bands] to get into" than the Protomen.

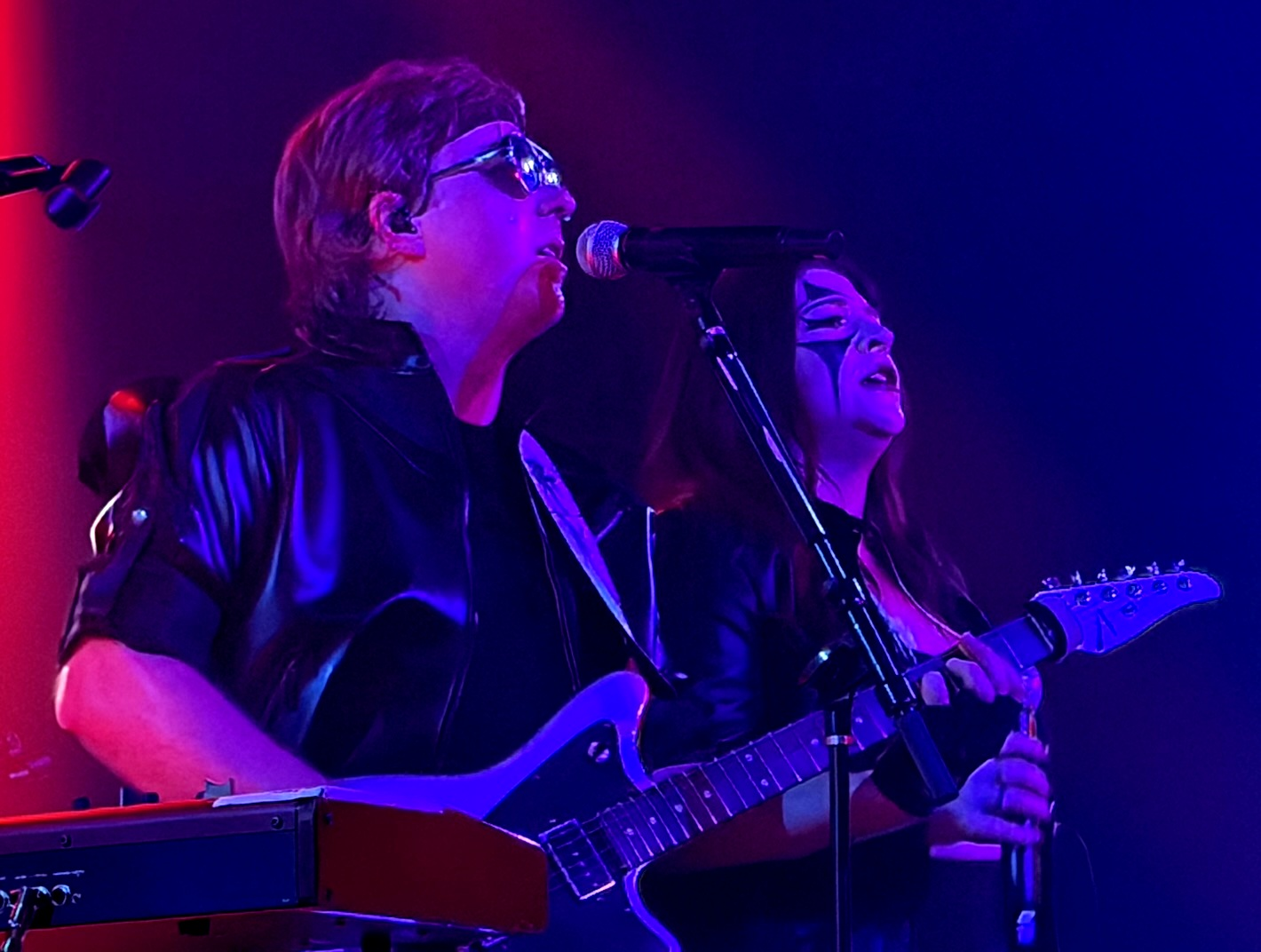
Raul Panther and the Gambler performing in 2026.

Publications most frequently spotlight lead vocalists Raul Panther III and Gambler Kirkdouglas. MetalSucks says Panther "sounds eerily like Freddie Mercury" and praised his work in a cover of "The Trooper", calling it "Iron Maiden as sung by Freddie Mercury". The Gambler was compared to Pat Benatar with operatic vocals.

The Protomen garner significant support in Murfreesboro and Nashville, leading to a variety of responses. Nashville Scene staff writers published numerous positive pieces on the Protomen. Nashville music professionals polled by the publication in 2008 named the Protomen as one of the acts that "ruled" the city and performed the best live show for the year. For the 2009 poll, Drew Mischke of Mercy Lounge said, "The local scene was down this year, but the Protomen stood out with their sold-out show at Mercy", and the band was again named as one of the best stage shows by a different professional. Then in 2010 during the publication's year-end poll a professional named the act as the band they were most "sick of seeing/hearing about". The Protomen had released Act II the year before. Michael Eades named the Protomen again in the 2026 poll for a band he hoped "will rule Nashville in 2026" and the band placed third in the publication's annual "best band in Nashville" reader poll.

=== Responses in other media ===
In a 2012 issue of the officially licensed Archie Comics Mega Man, the team responded "we love 'em!" to a fan question about The Protomen and The Megas (another Mega Man themed band). The same year, Brentalfloss and Eddie Lebron produced a parody of The Protomen's stage show called "The Pokémen".

Some of their songs were included in Rock Band 4 in 2015. GameSpot called the inclusion of "Light Up the Night" from Act II: The Father of Death a "seriously inspired choice". The single version of "This City Made Us" was released as a DLC for Rock Band 4 in 2019.

Keiji Inafune's Mighty No. 9, the 2016 spiritual successor to Mega Man, included a billboard of the Protomen's logo in one of its stages. While Fandom.com staff reviewer Drew Dietsch panned the game, they positively reviewed the inclusion of fandom Easter eggs like the Protomen reference, and called them a "truly excellent rock band".

Tommy Shaw of Styx revealed in 2019 that they reintroduced "Mr. Roboto" to their touring set list based on the Protomen's cover: "One day I was looking to see if anyone had covered 'Mr. Roboto,' and this band, The Protomen had, covered it as more of a rock song. It was more like if Freddie Mercury would have done it. I always thought if we were going to do it, Lawrence should sing it more like that; so, that's how we play it." Shaw said they are really performing "a cover of a cover" by performing the Protomen's version in their shows.

=== As fandom ===
Mega Man music "is some of the most extensively covered and remixed" video game music in the world, according to Alyssa Aska of University of Calgary. Musicians such as the Protomen demonstrate the importance of studying video game music: "The approaches taken by The Megas and Protomen indicate that video game music can be re-visited by musicians in extremely creative and interactive ways, which is perhaps in the spirit of gaming culture."

People "willing to do complex work for free are quite common in the Mega Man community", including writing and performing a rock opera, according to Salvatore Pane in "The Fans Who Won't Let Mega Man Die". He argues the Protomen, like other Mega Man-inspired acts and fan projects, reflect Henry Jenkins's conclusion that fanwork is the public reclaiming mythos from corporations. "These fan products are not simply funhouse mirror regurgitations of Mega Man. They build atop the foundations laid down by [Mega Man creators] [Akira] Kitamura and [Keiji] Inafune, pushing them through the cultural lenses and influences of the fans themselves. [...] The longer Capcom goes without generating fresh Mega Man content, the more the character and his mythos become defined by the fans."

== Band members ==
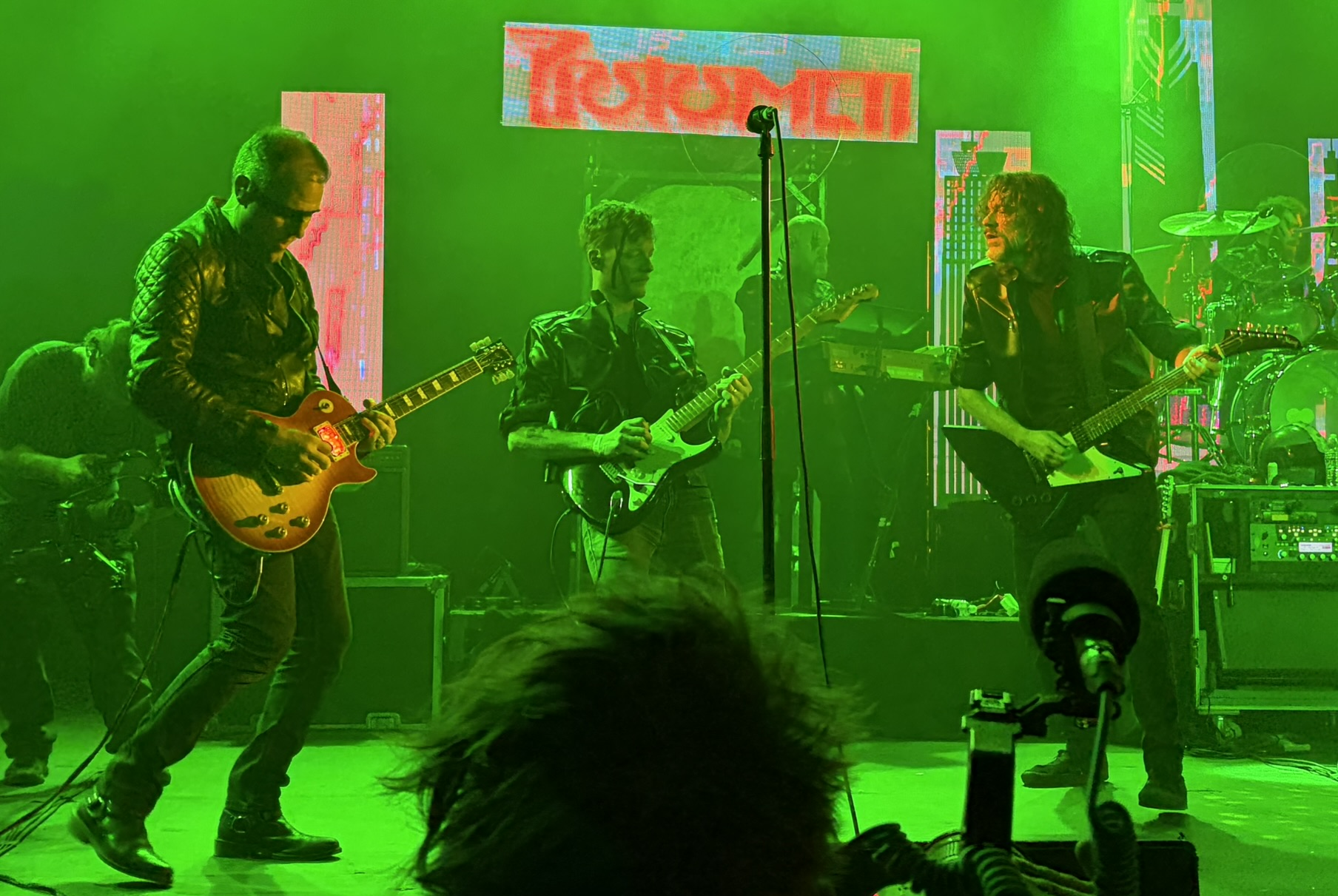
Former guitarist Heath Who Hath No Name performing as a guest with current guitarists Sir Dr. Robert Bakker and Shock Magnum.

The Protomen perform semi-anonymously, using only aliases on stage. Band members choose stage names based on pop culture such as films, song titles, and fictional characters. The Chattanooga Pulse reported on their stage characterization: "As far as who they really are—that pretty much remains a mystery unless you want to come out and see if you can coax one of the members to break character." The band intentionally cultivates narratives about their act. The guitarist who goes by Sir Dr. Robert Bakker said in 2011, "There's a lot of hearsay and mystique about the band[.] [...] There's a lot of fake material we like to send people." They are frequently described as mysterious.

As of 2015, the Protomen have had more than 25 members, including former members.

Current members

- Raul Panther III – vocals, multi-instruments
- Murphy Weller – bass synthesizer, bass guitar, percussions
- Commander B. Hawkins – synthesizer, vocoder, percussions
- Sir Dr. Robert Bakker – guitar
- Shock Magnum – guitar
- Gambler Kirkdouglas – human choir, vocals, synthesizer, vocoder
- Reanimator Lovejoy – drums
- Kilroy (stylized K.I.L.R.O.Y.) – fist pumps, hand claps, armorer, sledgehammer, maracas and jarana
- Master Blaster – trumpet
- Scösh – human choir, vocals
- The Slapper – human choir, vocals

Former members

- Doug Fetterman – guitar
- The Merchant – human choir
- The Keeper – synthesizer, vocoder
- The Replicant – trumpet
- Demon Barber – drums
- The Dragon – drums
- Scartoe Gleason – guitar
- The Repeater – human choir
- The Keymaster – drums
- Heath Who Hath No Name – guitar
- Cobra T. Washington – guitar
- Lazer – human choir
- The Gunslinger – guitar
- Ellen Aim – human choir
- Nightwalker T. Ranger – human choir, trumpet
- Neon Leon – guitar
- Ringo Segundo – guitar
- Turbo Lover – vocals, multi-instruments
- Robobot – guitar

== Discography ==
=== Studio albums ===
- The Protomen (2005)
- Act II: The Father of Death (2009)
- The Cover Up: Original Soundtrack From the Motion Picture (2015)
- Act III: This City Made Us (2026)

=== Live albums ===
- The Protomen Present: A Night of Queen (2012)
- The Protomen: Live in Nashville (2020)

=== Soundtrack albums ===
- William Shakespeare Presents: Terminator The Second (with 84001) (2013)

=== Extended plays ===
- The Cover Up EP (2014)

=== Singles ===
- "Father of Death / No Easy Way Out" - (2008)
- "Beards Going Nowhere" - - (2008)
- "I Drove All Night / Silent Running (On Dangerous Ground) – Breaking Out (2012 Edit)" - (2012)
- "Built to Last" - (2013) (first released as the headliner of MM25: Mega Man Rocks by Capcom)
- "This City Made Us / Hold Back the Night" - (2015)
- "The Fight" - (2022)

=== As a guest ===
- MC Frontalot, Kid Koala - "Shudders" (2014)
- TWRP - "Phantom Racer" (2018)

== Filmography ==
- Terminator the Second (2011), SWAT Team
- Light Up the Night (2016), as themselves
- Live In Nashville (2020), as themselves

== See also ==
- Danger Days: The True Lives of the Fabulous Killjoys—rock concept album by My Chemical Romance with themes of fascist governments and science fiction
- Kilroy Was Here (album)—rock opera by Styx with themes of fascist governments and science fiction
- List of geek rock artists
- List of dystopian music
- List of apocalyptic and post-apocalyptic fiction
