= Act II: The Father of Death =

Studio album by The Protomen
- Released: September 8, 2009
- Genres: Rock opera; new wave; progressive rock
- Length: 57:15
- Label: Sound Machine
- Producers: Alan Shacklock, The Protomen

The Protomen chronology
The Protomen (2005)	Act II: The Father of Death (2009)	Present: A Night of Queen (2012)

The Protomen rock opera chronology
Act II: The Father of Death (2009)	The Protomen (2005)

Singles from Act II: The Father of Death
- 1. "Father of Death" Released: November 10, 2008

Act II: The Father of Death is the second album by rock band the Protomen. The album was produced by Alan Shacklock. Act II revisits the Mega Man-inspired rock opera from the band's first album, The Protomen, which is retrospectively referred to as Act I. It is the prequel to Act I, focusing on the relationship between protagonist Thomas Light and Albert Wily before Wily's takeover of their city.

The next album in the Protomen's rock opera, Act III: This City Made Us, was released on January 9, 2026.

== Background ==
A demo of "Breaking Out" was leaked prior to the album release. The Protomen posted a higher quality version of the demo to their website in response. A clip of the "Keep Quiet" demo premiered on podcast The Nerdy Show June 19, 2009, three months before the release of Act II.

The band released a preview track in August, composed of all of the album's songs playing at the same time. On September 2, 2009, the album's track list, cover art, and full title were revealed (previously, the band had referred to the album simply as Act II). The album was released a week later, on September 8, 2009, and was available for immediate digital purchase. CDs began shipping September 11. The group has stated that they were largely influenced by the 1984 film Streets of Fire. A promotional website flash experience designed by Version Industries premiered with the album.

The album was produced by Alan Shacklock.

== Plot ==
Doctor Thomas Light partners with Doctor Albert Wily to create labor robots to perform dangerous work. However, on the day the machines are to be activated, Light begins to have second thoughts, concerned with the number of workers who will be displaced. Wily convinces Light that they have come too far to back out now and Light hesitantly flips the switch to activate the machines. As the machines come to life, Light leaves the workshop, plagued by doubts towards both the future of the city and Wily's intentions. He heads to his home to meet with his lover, Emily Stanton; however, Wily also leaves to ransack the place for some crucial element of his plan ("The Good Doctor").

Wily arrives to Light's apartment first and Emily catches him trespassing. Emily rebukes Wily and he orders his modified sniper robot to kill her, leaving the scene. Light finds the sniper robot on the fire escape holding a bloody knife, which it tosses towards Emily's body before escaping. At that moment, the police arrive. Light's claims of a robot killer are dismissed, and he flees ("Father of Death"). Meanwhile, Wily addresses the city in a press conference broadcast through a giant telescreen. He implicates Light in Emily's murder, riling up the citizens and assuring them that he will not go unpunished ("The Hounds").

Light is eventually apprehended several days later at Emily's otherwise unattended funeral and is put on trial. He is found not guilty, but sees himself as guilty for enabling Wily to gain power ("The State Vs. Thomas Light"). A mob forms outside of the courthouse, enraged at what they perceive as a failure of the court system after Light is found not guilty. To prevent the mob from lynching Light, the police take him to the train station, where he leaves for the outskirts of the city ("Give Us the Rope"). With his former partner now ostracized, Wily is free to enact his plans without resistance. As the years pass, the citizens slowly grow dependent on the robots integrated into daily life, turning the city into a technological marvel. A new generation grows up under Wily's regime, knowing no life before him. However, the citizens of the city now live in fear of Wily's robot army ("How the World Fell Under Darkness").

Years after Light is exiled, a young man named Joe, tired of what the city has become, leaves ("Breaking Out"). In the outskirts of the city, Joe realizes that he is being followed by one of Wily's robots and fights it. He manages to shoot the robot with its own weapon and holds it off long enough for an aged, grey-haired Doctor Light to appear and destroy it ("Keep Quiet"). As they talk, Light and Joe begin to make plans to take down Wily and free the city from his reign: Joe will break into Wily's tower and scale it in order to destroy his main transmitter, allowing Light to slip into the city and kill Wily while his 'eyes' are down ("Light Up the Night"). The pair make their move, and Joe executes the first part of the plan, crashing through the doors of Wily's compound with his motorcycle. He climbs to the top of the tower with a bomb that he intends to detonate with a transmitter. Upon reaching the roof he discovers that it had already been lined with explosives, which detonate as he turns to flee. Light watches helplessly as Joe's body is blown off the tower, falling to the street below ("The Fall").

Light realizes the existence of a second transmitter, from a tower far to the east. Wily, having waited for this moment, declares that the city is under attack by 'insurgent forces' and a long-prepared army of robots marches from his eastern fortress into the city. Light feels helpless against the coming retaliation. Having previously been unable to do so, he reads a letter Emily had written the night she died. In the letter, Emily declares her love for Light and corrals him into action. Light removes Joe's helmet and addresses his mangled body, declaring that he "still has work to do" ("Here Comes the Arm").

== Track listing ==
All tracks written and composed by the Protomen.

No.	Title	Length
1.	"Intermission"	1:12
2.	"The Good Doctor"	6:08
3.	"Father of Death"	5:04
4.	"The Hounds"	4:31
5.	"The State Vs. Thomas Light"	4:02
6.	"Give Us the Rope"	3:10
7.	"How the World Fell Under Darkness"	3:22
8.	"Breaking Out"	7:16
9.	"Keep Quiet"	7:30
10.	"Light Up the Night"	4:04
11.	"The Fall"	3:15
12.	"Here Comes the Arm"	7:44

== Reception ==
Act II: The Father of Death debuted at No. 31 on the Billboard Heatseekers album chart for the week of October 3, 2009. Consequence of Sound ranked it at number 78 out of the top hundred albums released in 2009. Tom Hull ranked the album at position 2,072 for 2009 releases included in end-of-year lists, with two inclusions on lists.

GamePro's response to Act II was positive: "The Protomen have crafted such a superb record with Act II that they've vaulted themselves out of the obscure 'video game music' genre and into a class of concept record artists that no video game-inspired band has, or most-likely will reach." Esports News UK rated the album 10 out of 10, calling the album a "visceral masterpiece". Piero Scaruffi says the album is "a more mature work, with more expressive vocals and a more aggressive sound" than Act I. The "unstoppable intensity" of "Light Up the Night" was "perfect" according to Derivative Magazine. Penny Arcade called the musical style "Rock Americana". The Mary Sue called the story element "a pretty fantastic Mega Man origin story" that "focuses more on Light and Wily’s rivalry and the rise of Mega Man as a hero" and suggested that it could be inspiration for a Hollywood-produced Mega Man film.

A vinyl version of the album was released in spring 2018 and reached No. 24 on the vinyl albums Billboard chart. The album's vinyl release packaging was a finalist for the 2018 industry Making Vinyl Conference's Alex Steinweiss Award for Best In Show, Best Vinyl Album Cover (Illustrated), Best Vinyl Gatefold, and "They Said It Couldn’t Be Done – Vinyl", a category for "innovation in vinyl packaging structural design".

== Legacy ==
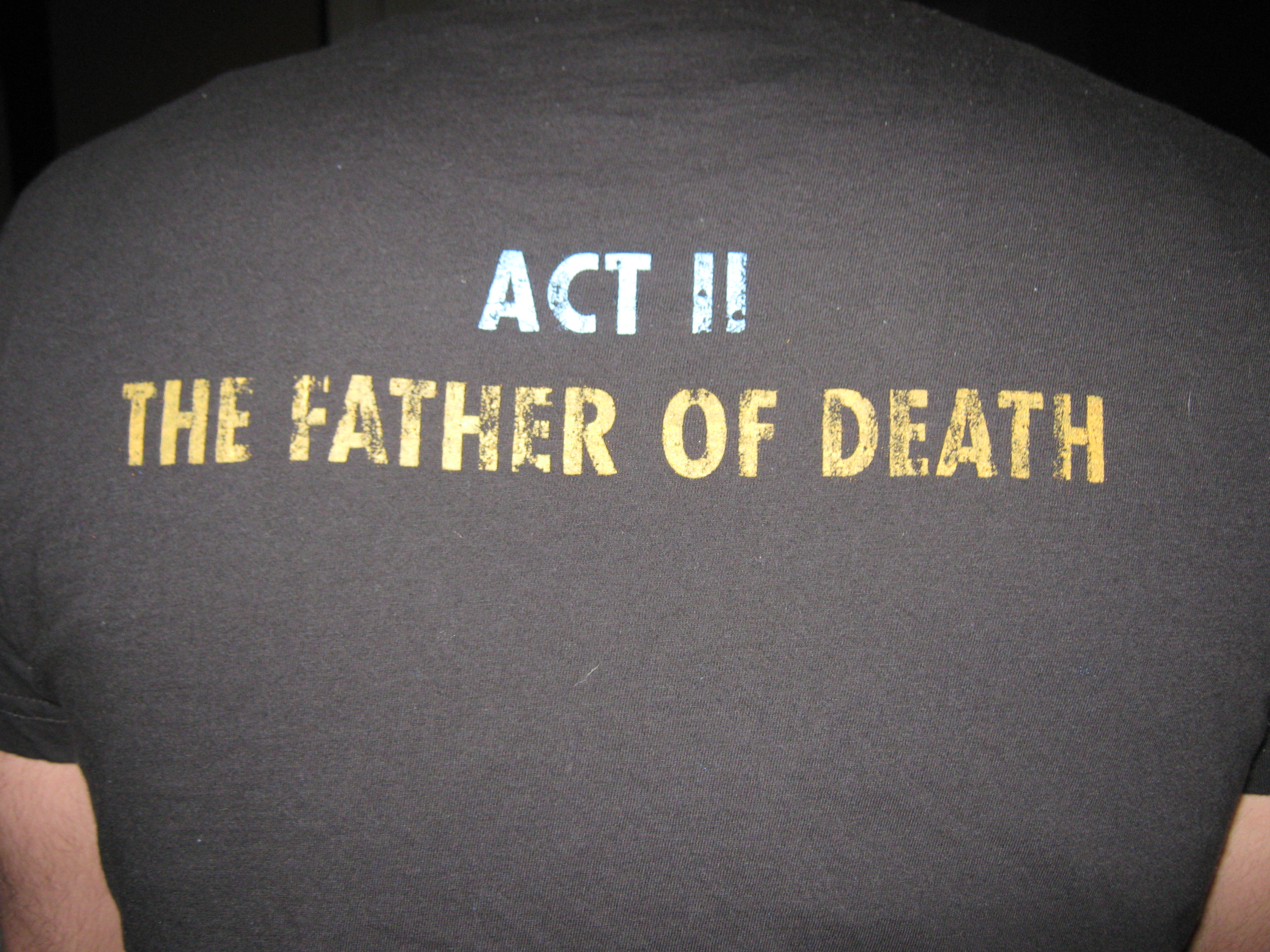
Fan wearing a t-shirt for the Protomen's album Act II: The Father of Death.

=== Short film ===
A short film titled "Light Up The Night", which is directed by Matt Sundin and Caspar Newbolt, and serves as the official music video for the song of the same name, was released June 12, 2016. Featuring the Protomen in concert footage and running 16 minutes, the film recounts an abridged version of the story of Act II: The Father of Death, with James Ransone starring as Joe. Other tracks featured in the film include "The Fall" and a portion of "Breaking Out." John Sebastian La Valle wrote the screen adaptation and pitched it to the band at a performance. A positive review from Consequence of Sound described the film as a "grim tale of loss in an android-enforced surveillance state." Nintendo Life note the cinematography, writing, and symbolism as "incorporated perfectly."

=== Music appearances in other media ===
On August 24, 2015, Harmonix announced that the band's hit song, "Light Up the Night" would be included in the music video game, Rock Band 4.

Songs from the album featured in the first season of the web series Video Game High School. The songs "Breaking Out", "Keep Quiet", and "Light Up the Night" featured during the 4th episode while "The Fall" was the last track during the finale of the series. "I Am No Lionhart", a song written by Devin Begly and sung by Raul Panther III, the Protomen's lead singer, was featured in the season 3 finale of the show.

"Light Up the Night" was used in the first trailer of the video game The Wolf Among Us 2.

== Personnel ==
=== Musicians ===
- Raul Panther III – vocals, synthesizers, drum programming, field recording
- Commander B. Hawkins – synthesizers, drum programming, field recording
- Murphy Weller – bass synthesizers, guitar, background vocals
- Scartoe Gleason – guitars
- Doug Mesich – drums, drum programming
- Andy Spore (courtesy of How I Became the Bomb) – drums
- Alan Shacklock – classical guitar
- Turbo Lover – featured vocals
- The Gambler – featured vocals, background vocals
- Nightwalker – background vocals
- Valeria Navarre – background vocals
- Jessica French – background vocals
- Nathan Hunter – background vocals
- Peter Matteson – background vocals
- Derek Haight – saxophone
- Mikey Martel – trumpet
- K.I.L.R.O.Y – harmonica, jarana
- Heath Who Hath No Name – field recording

=== Production ===
- Greg Costa – cartage and drum tech
- Alan Shacklock – production, engineering
- The Protomen – production, art direction
- Richard Dodd – mastering
- Kim Leva – assistant engineer
- Crystal Armentrout – assistant engineer
- Version Industries – art direction, album design
- John DeLucca – original artwork
