= We the Living (disambiguation) =

We the Living is a 1936 novel by Ayn Rand.

We the Living may also refer to:

- We the Living (band), a United States alternative rock group
- We the Living (film), a 1942 Italian film, based on the novel by Ayn Rand, directed by Goffredo Alessandrini

== See also ==
- For Us the Living: The Medgar Evers Story, a 1986 television film
- We Are the Dead (disambiguation)
- For Us, the Living, a novel by Robert Heinlein
- We Are the Living, a 1933 collection of short stories by Erskine Caldwell
- You, the Living, a film directed by Roy Andersson (2007)
