= We Are the Dead =

We Are the Dead may refer to:

- "We are the Dead", the opening words of the second stanza of "In Flanders Fields", a poem written during the First World War
- "We are the dead", a phrase uttered by Winston and echoed by Julia in George Orwell's Nineteen Eighty-Four
- "We are the dead", a phrase repeated often throughout the concept album The Protomen
- We Are the Dead (album), by Antagonist A.D.
- "We Are the Dead" (song), by David Bowie

== See also ==
- We the Living (disambiguation)
