= Act III: This City Made Us =

Studio album by the Protomen
- Released: January 9, 2026
- Genres: Rock opera, progressive rock
- Length: 59:51
- Label: Sound Machine Records
- Producers: The Protomen, David Kalmusky

The Protomen chronology
The Cover Up: Original Soundtrack From the Motion Picture (2015)	Act III: This City Made Us (2026)

The Protomen rock opera chronology
The Protomen (2005)	Act III: This City Made Us (2026)

Singles from Act III: This City Made Us
- 1. "This City Made Us" Released: August 28, 2015

Act III: This City Made Us (colloquially referred to as Act III) is the fifth studio album by American rock band the Protomen. Released January 9, 2026, the album revisits the band's rock opera concept. Act III is the sequel to The Protomen (2005), which is colloquially referred to as Act I.

== Background ==
This City Made Us and Hold Back the Night were previously released as singles in 2015. Hold Back the Night made the staff end of year list on Consequence of Sound.

== Plot ==
A girl watches the stars and city from a rooftop. The building beside her collapses from a missile attack sent by the city's leader Albert Wily ("The Calm"). She hurriedly makes her way to a meeting with the small rebel group she leads, where Thomas Light says they have no hope in their fight against Wily. The girl rebukes him and, seeing the crowd is ready to fight, Light leaves ("Hold Back the Night"). She follows him to a trainyard, where a tracking device reveals Megaman's location in the mountains north of the city ("The Trainyard").

Light gives the girl the coordinates written on a photo and she leaves to find Megaman. Light reflects on the state of the city and makes his way into Wily's fortress, using a device to disable the robot guards ("No Way Back"). In his fortress control room, Wily is frustrated by his failed attacks on the rebels ("The Storm"). He fires another pair of rockets and drinks ("Buried in the Red").

The girl arrives at Megaman's location and urges him to return and fight Wily ("Calling Out"). Megaman, in anger at humanity for its failure to fight with his family in the past, refuses to return. Disgusted by his inaction, the girl returns to the city without him ("This City Made Us"). Megaman reflects on the fight he abandoned and his father, Light, then changes his mind and runs towards the city ("Hold On (The Distance Between)"). The girl sees missiles hitting the city as she drives back ("The Redline").

Wily enjoys watching people falling to his robot army through drone cameras until the drones malfunction ("A Show of Force"). Light knows Wily intends to destroy the people with a new machine. He falls asleep working on a project and dreams of his dead partner Emily, who tells him that even though he wants to stay in the dream with her, there is still work to be done and he must wake up ("The Dream"). Once awake, he visits her grave with her music box and heads for Wily's tower. On the way, he disables robots and notices a subtext of fear in the usual doublespeak propaganda broadcast to the city. He reaches the top of the control tower, where Wily privately questions whether he should have activated his unpredictable new machine to fight the city's people ("Light's Last Stand").

Light reveals himself in Wily's office and argues with Wily, trying to convince him to stand down his robot army. Wily initially feels pity for the former colleague he feared and hated, but after Wily opens the music box Light brought, he orders his robots to beat and arrest Light, who doesn't resist. The victory feels empty. The main screen and loudspeakers order the city's people to gather to "witness the beginning of a new era of peace and freedom" ("The Good Doctor • Part 2").

Citizens, rebels, and the girl arrive at the fortress to watch in excitement and fear as Wily's robots push Light onto a gallows. Megaman, who is exhausted from running, sees this on the main screen and pushes himself to race across the city. He reaches the crowd of onlookers and struggles to get through. Light sees "a flash of blue" in the crowd as the rope slips around his neck and thinks of Emily. A loud slamming sound is heard, followed by creaking ("The Fate of Thomas Light").

== Concepts and analysis ==
CD pregap track sample
A sample of the CD album's hidden pregap track.

Physical copies of CD albums are accompanied by printed libretto in liner note booklets that include illustrations, narration, and stage direction not present in the songs. The CD includes an audio track hidden in the pregap styled after a radio broadcast numbers station, with sounds of a pencil scratching. The vinyl release includes a spoken word track hidden after a locked groove with a message from Light.

The story contains tropes from 1980s United States dystopian fiction. Lyrical and story ties to the source material and callbacks to previous albums in the rock opera trilogy were noted by reviewers. The composition has been described as cinematic, with synthwave rock opera aesthetics noted by The Progressive Subway. Synth elements were also highlighted by The Live Wire.

== Release ==
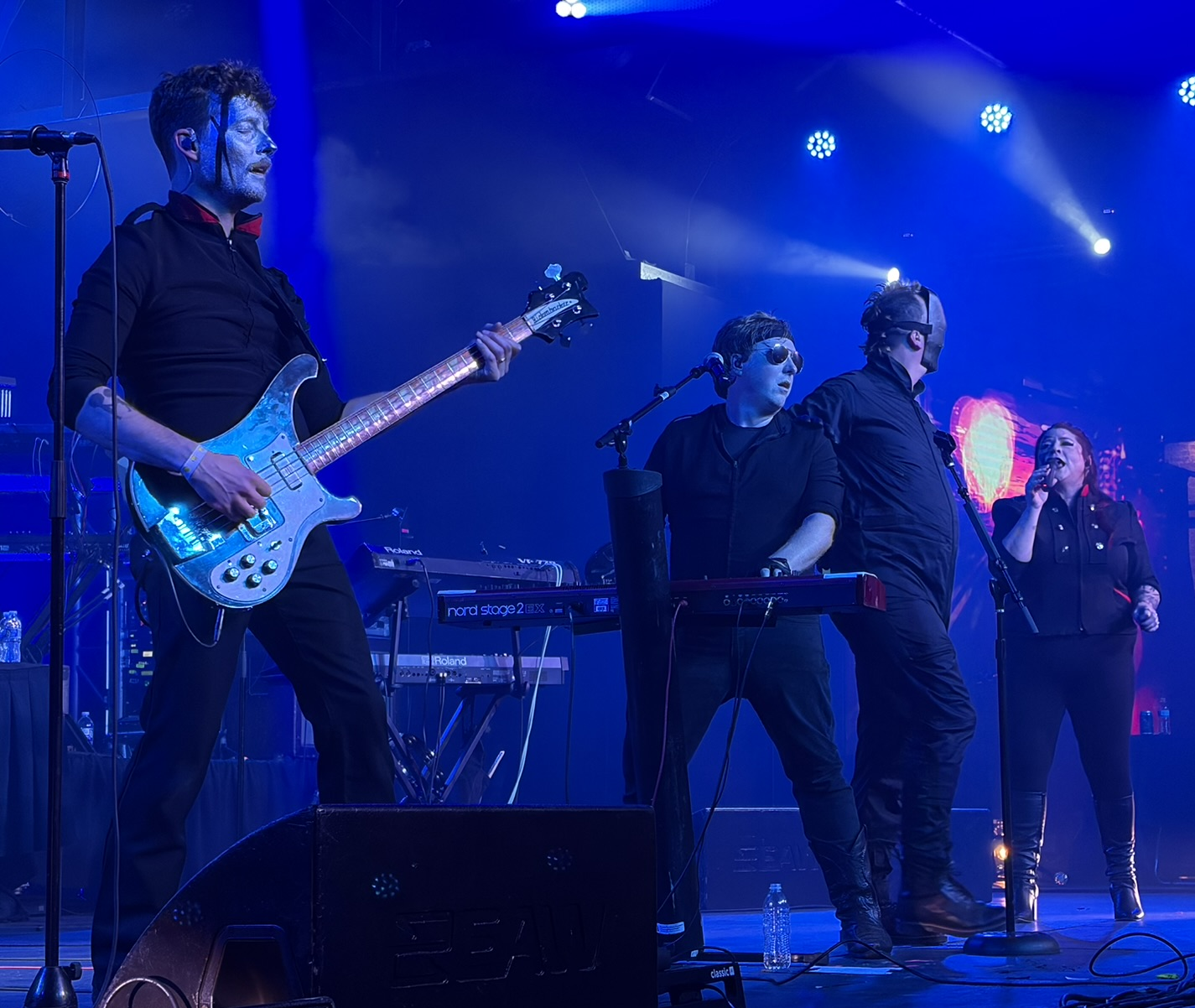
Members of the Protomen performing at the release show for Act III in Nashville.

On October 3, 2025, the album's first two tracks, cover art, and full title were revealed. Previously, the band had referred to the album simply as Act III.

From October 3 to December 5, 2025, the band released the album's tracks weekly on Bandcamp ahead of its official release date of January 9, 2026. The tracks were released with accompanying artwork designed by Version Industries.

In 2026, the band performed three concerts at Super MAGFest, each the entirety one of the acts in their rock opera, culminating in the final night dedicated to Act III to promote its release. The official Act III release show will be a three night performance from June 18–20, 2026 at Marathon Music Works in Nashville.

== Reception ==
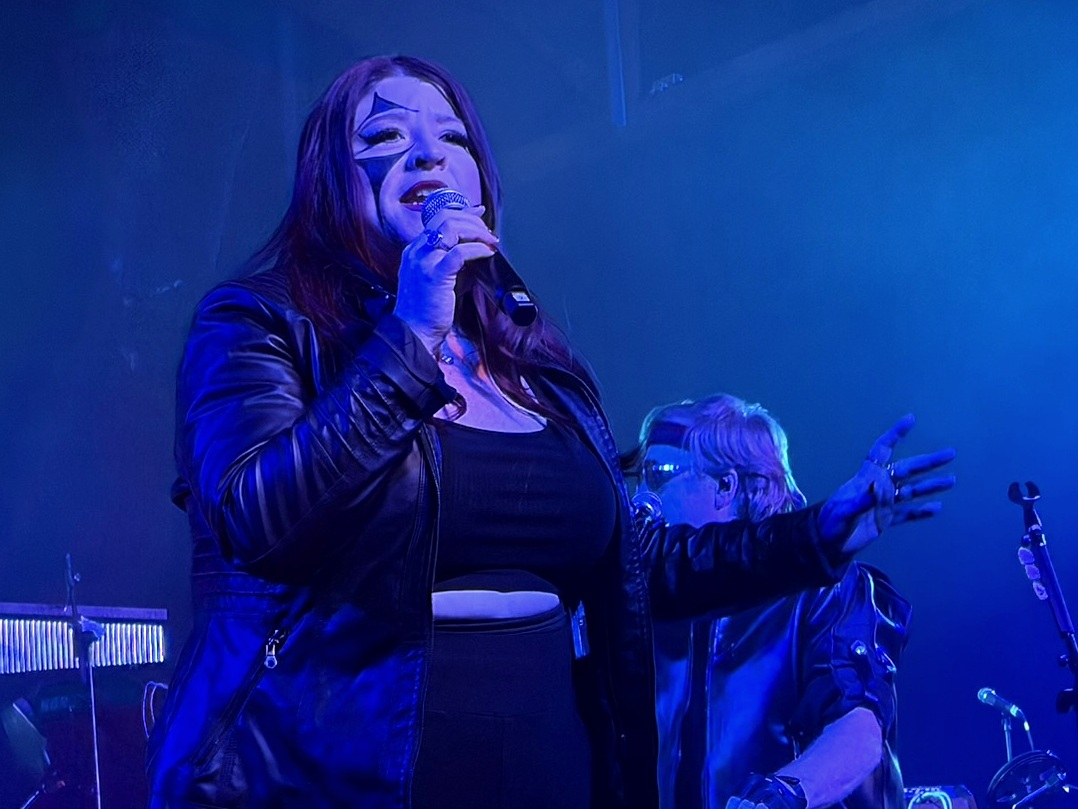
The Gambler performing at the album release show in Nashville.

Rolling Stone France included "Light's Last Stand" in their weekend playlist. The Live Wire Music Media described the album as the band's magnum opus, and "as close to perfect as you can get". Rocking.GR praised the album for its lively and organic production, highlighted performances by Raul Panther III and Gambler Kirkdouglas, and noted the album was "absolutely" worth the 5,965-day wait. The German magazine ROCKS concluded, "Act III is a wild ride, incredibly catchy, and still full of surprises even after multiple listens."

Nashville Scene named Act III best sequel of 2026.

== Track listing ==
All tracks are written by The Protomen.

Act III: This City Made Us track listing
No.	Title	Length
0.	Untitled (pregap track on CD (Note: A spoken word hidden track, placed in the compact disc pregap. A sequence of numbers is read out in the style of a numbers station broadcast, with an intermittent tuning signal. The dialogue corresponds to the transcription on the first page of the libretto.))	5:14
1.	"The Calm"	3:01
2.	"Hold Back the Night"	6:43
3.	"The Trainyard"	1:37
4.	"No Way Back"	6:00
5.	"The Storm"	0:58
6.	"Buried In The Red"	3:41
7.	"Calling Out"	3:52
8.	"This City Made Us"	6:03
9.	"Hold On (The Distance Between)"	5:20
10.	"The Redline"	0:36
11.	"A Show of Force"	3:36
12.	"The Dream"	1:40
13.	"Light's Last Stand"	6:37
14.	"The Good Doctor • Part 2"	6:40
15.	"The Fate of Thomas Light"	3:27
Total length:		59:51

== Personnel ==
All music and lyrics by The Protomen. Recorded at Addiction Sound Studios, Sound Machine Studios, and RCA Studio A (Grand Victor Sound).

=== Musicians ===
- Raul Panther III – vocals, synthesizers, guitars, bass, orchestral arrangements, drum programming, backing vocals, foley and sound design
- Commander B. Hawkins – synthesizers, field recording, drum programming, foley and sound design
- Murphy Weller – synthesizers, bass
- Gambler Kirkdouglas – vocals, vocoder, backing vocals
- Reanimator Lovejoy – drums, drum programming
- Shock Magnum – guitars, bass
- Sir Dr. Robert Bakker – guitars, bass
- Heath Who Hath No Name – guitars
- Ringo Segundo – guitars
- Luke Fields – bass
- Alan Shacklock – classical guitar
- K.I.L.R.O.Y. – harmonic jarana
- Master Blaster – trumpet, French horn
- Tim Cappello – saxophone
- Czech National Symphony Orchestra – strings
- Kristin Weber – additional violin
- Brady Mills – additional backing vocals
- Valarie Navarre – additional backing vocals
- Larissa Maestro – additional backing vocals
- Peter Matteson – additional backing vocals
- Murray Shaw – field recording
- Alanna Matysek – foley and sound design
- Andrew Core – additional drums

=== Production ===
- The Protomen – production, mixing, Dolby Atmos mix, art direction
- David Kalmusky – production, mixing
- David Shivers – Dolby Atmos mix, engineering
- Ethan Bartette – engineering
- Alberto Sewald – engineering
- Bert Stone – engineering
- Patrick Himes – engineering
- Mikie Martel – engineering
- Cam Solon – assistant engineer
- Ari Phillips – assistant engineer
- Adam Beachy – assistant engineer
- Tommy Dorsey – mastering (at Masterfonics Mastering)
- Andy Spore – cartage and drum tech
- Dave Johnson – guitar tech
- Version Industries – art direction
- Caspar Newbolt (Version Industries) – design
- John DeLucca – illustration
- Ben Trappey – libretto
- Nick Fowler – additional editing
- W.B. Biggs – additional editing

== Commercial performance ==
Act III was the most pre-ordered album on Bandcamp in 2025, as well as the fourth bestselling album and the number one bestselling CD on the site for the year. The album debuted at number nine on the Billboard Top Album Sales chart for the end of January 2026, and had the number three spot on Top Canadian Album Sales for the same week. For the same time period, the Protomen charted at number four on Emerging Artists and broke into Artist 100 for the first time at number 89.

=== Charts ===
Chart performance for Act III: This City Made Us
Chart (2026)	Peak position
US Top Album Sales (Billboard)	9
