= The Protomen (album) =

Studio album by The Protomen
- Released: September 3, 2005
- Genres: Rock opera; noise rock; hard rock
- Length: 36:53
- Labels: Self-released, Sound Machine (re-release)
- Producer: Heath Who Hath No Name

The Protomen chronology
The Protomen (2005)	Act II: The Father of Death (2009)

The Protomen rock opera chronology
Act II: The Father of Death (2009)	The Protomen (2005)	Act III: This City Made Us (2026)

The Protomen, colloquially referred to as Act I, is the 2005 debut concept album release by Nashville, Tennessee-based rock band the Protomen. The hard rock music features elements of noise rock, analog distortion, synth, and in live renditions, audience participation. In this rock opera, genius scientist Dr. Thomas Light builds two robotic sons who each attempt to defeat their dystopian city's Orwellian dictator and meet tragedy when they fail. The plot of the album is inspired by the Mega Man games.

The Protomen formed in 2003 as students in the studio recording program at Middle Tennessee State University. The album was produced between 2003 and 2005 in multiple locations as the students lost access to the university recording equipment after graduating. Themes of rebellion against unjust authorities and the use of analog effects like mastering on tape to intentionally retain the analog distortion were responses to being taught recording industry conventions at university, which favor digitally produced tracks with mainstream sounds.

The album received a positive response from video game publications, internet gaming communities, and the local Murfreesboro, Tennessee music community. The response to the album led to a trilogy of albums on this theme. The prequel Act II: The Father of Death was released on September 8, 2009, and the sequel Act III: This City Made Us was released on January 9, 2026.

== Plot ==
The album begins with a narrator describing a dystopia ruled by Dr. Albert Wily and his army of robots. Dr. Thomas Light builds a robot to lead a rebellion, who is named Protoman. Protoman fights against Wily's army. However, after defeating many of Wily's robots, Protoman is weakened and the robot army launches a final assault. The human crowd that gathers to watch Protoman fight feels hopeless and does not assist him, standing aside and allowing him to die while chanting “we are the dead” ("Hope Rides Alone").

The crowd takes Protoman's helmet to a grave site as Dr. Light reflects on his grief at Protoman's death and realizes Protoman was not just a fighting robot, but his son. In a rage, he began destroying his workshop. As his anger, guilt, grief and love overtook him, he redirected the wreckage into constructing a new son named Megaman ("Funeral for a Son"). Years later, people still talk about Protoman, and Light knows that Megaman will soon find out about his brother. To dissuade Megaman from attempting to rebel against Wily, Light reluctantly tells Megaman Protoman's story, and explains that the people have "chosen their own end"—they will not fight to save themselves ("Unrest in the House of Light"). Megaman defies Light and sets out to defeat Wily, stopping at Protoman's grave. At the grave, Megaman sees the marker defaced with the words 'hope rides alone' and a human mob begins following him toward the fortress. While loudspeakers attempt to suppress the uprising, the words of propaganda are instead reclaimed by the rallying crowd ("The Will of One").

In a rage now that he has learned of his brother and seen his grave, Megaman fights through Wily's army of robots, as the commander of the army watches from the shadows. Megaman sees that the commander is like him and dares him to fight. The commander steps out of the darkness and reveals himself as Protoman ("Vengeance"). Light reflects that, as Protoman now stands with Wily, Megaman must now realise that he cannot both save humanity and avenge his brother. Protoman begins to speak. He expresses his rage at humanity for their inability to fight for themselves and that they only want a hero to die for the cause. Upon seeing Dr. Light in the crowd, Protoman hesitates then destroys the surrounding robots as he moves to stand alone in front of Megaman. He warns Megaman that they will not fight with him and that it is up to them to decide the fate of mankind ("The Stand").

Megaman is reluctant to fight and attempts to convince Protoman to leave Wily and fight to free humanity once again. Protoman refuses him, still in anger that the crowd refuses to fight for themselves. The crowd shouts for Megaman to destroy Protoman, saying that his death will save them as they repeat the same cowardice that previously doomed Protoman. With a blinding powershot, Megaman delivers a mortal wound to his brother. Protoman tells Megaman that one day the crowd will realize a hero is just a man who knows he is free before dying. Distraught and convinced of Protoman's earlier view Megaman declares that the crowd 'are the dead'. He drops his helmet and walks away from the fortress as Wily's robots massacre the crowd that was watching the battle. Megaman left the burning city, only pausing to look back when the voices of the crowd rose together, almost in unison: 'We are the dead' ("Sons of Fate").

== Style, writing, and composition ==
The Protomen is a rock opera. The sound has been described as rock, hard rock, glam rock, no wave, and electronica with elements of noise rock.

=== Concepts and analysis ===
Physical copies of CD albums are accompanied by printed libretto in liner note booklets that include narration and stage direction not present in the songs.

Act I is a tragedy in the same vein as its prequel rock opera Act II: The Father of Death.

The relationship between the crowd and heroes in the Protomen's music and performances has explicit parallels to Nineteen Eighty-Four by George Orwell. Video game reporter Benjamin Lamoreux explained, "Both stories have a very pronounced theme that the common man (the "proles" of 1984 and the humans of the Protomen) need to stand up and fight. It's not a enough for a Hero (be it a member of the Ingsoc society or mechanical savior) to take a stand."

The Act I crowd refrain "we are the dead" is a phrase from Nineteen Eighty-Four prophesying the characters' doom that is reinforced by the ubiquitous propaganda telescreens. In The Protomen, it reinforces the crowd's lack of will to free themselves.

But from the crowd, from the collective fear, arose these broken words:
We are the dead.
We are the dead.

— Narrator and Human Choir, in The Protomen, I: Hope Rides Alone

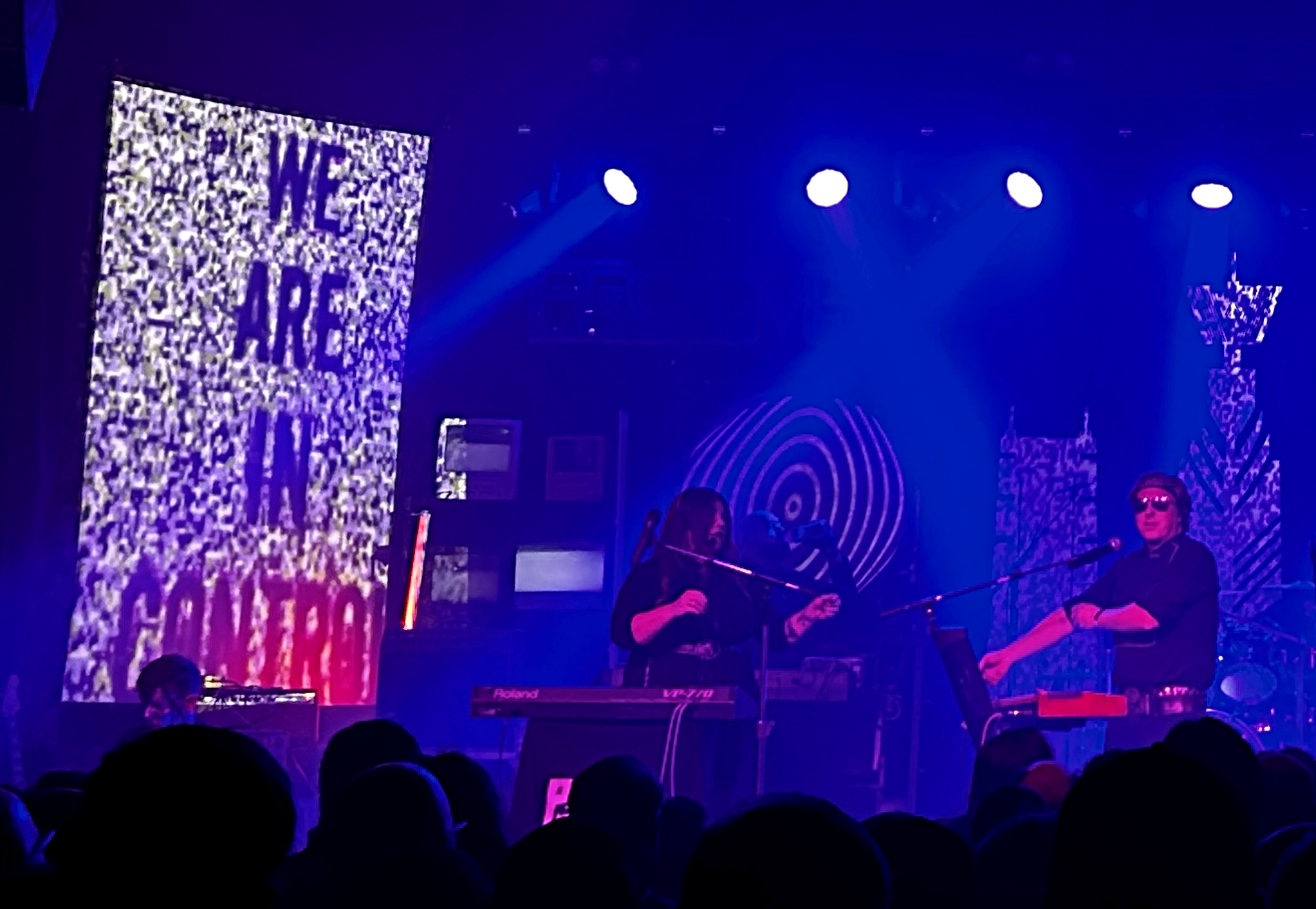
Propaganda at a performance of Act I in 2024.

Interpreting Act I in combination with the events of Act II, Sharp describes the inaction of the crowd in Act I as a function of hero worship from lack of agency under totalitarianism: "There was never an organized resistance to Wily's totalitarian society because once the people were deprived of a sense of responsibility for their own survival – when they no longer needed to work to live, they also psychologically gave up responsibility for their own destinies. They came to expect someone else to take care of all of their needs, leading to hero worship." Sharp calls Wily's city a "social auto-totality", a phrase coined by Václav Havel for a totalitarian system that relies on demoralizing the populace.

Science fiction tropes underpin the rock opera, such as the character of Wily, who is a mad scientist. The rock opera is inspired by the first six NES Mega Man games and the franchise's characters, who are primarily robots named after music genres such as blues and rock and roll. The Mega Man franchise has canonical storylines that the Protomen rock opera plot diverges from significantly. Many characters have names and roles from Mega Man, but the setting is a dark reimagining of the game's underlying world. Video game and science fiction inspired sound effects and electronic motifs crossover with the hard rock and rock and roll musical style, causing some critics to dub the group's style "science fiction rock."

== Critical and press reception ==
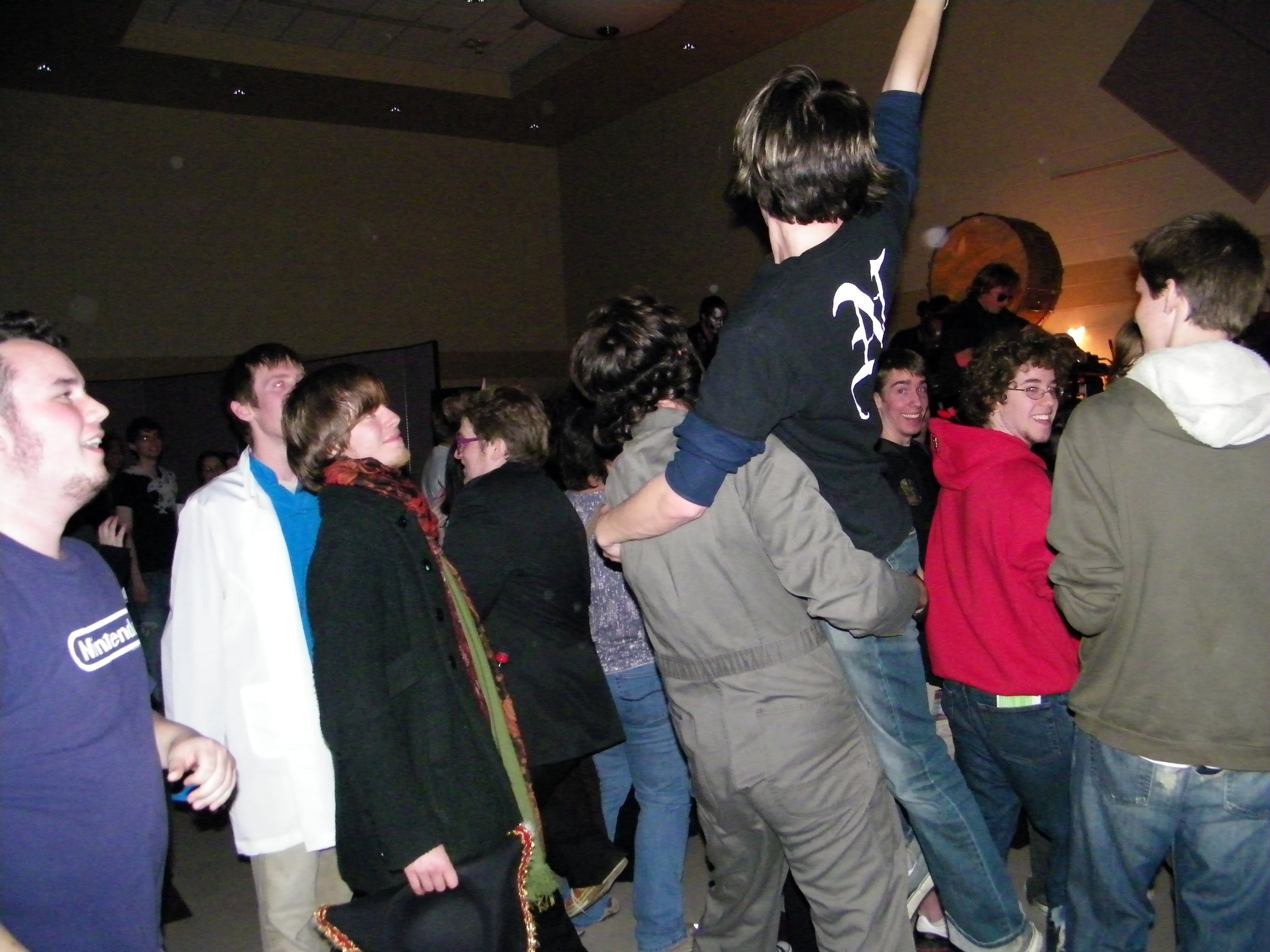
Kilroy carries a fan onstage to perform with the Protomen in 2009.

The album received favorable press from mainstream gaming magazines 1UP and The Escapist. Official Nintendo magazine Nintendo Power said the album was in a league of its own, and recommended it especially to fans of the Mega Man games. The Nintendo Power coverage led to national and international demand. Mix said "[t]he emotion, the music and performance's power certainly landed" and positively described "Unrest in the House of Light" as a "bizarre, heavy crash-and-burn blend of Spaghetti Western distorto-rock and dark country". Piero Scaruffi describes the album as a "style reminiscent of prog-rock of the 1970s, simply updated to the videogame subculture of their age and with the occasional heavy-metal discharge." GeekDad for Wired included "Unrest in the House of Light" in their list of "geeky music's finest specimens". The Rockvine said that while the nerd music genre had a reputation for being "unbearably amateur", The Protomen "isn't standard fan-made fare. In fact, if you must, forget that it has any basis in 'Mega Man.' It's a passionately-told tale about cowards who won't fight for their rights, forsaken heroes screaming truth in their faces, and undeniably rock-worthy robotic combat." The Commercial Appeal recommended the album for people who thought rock opera Kilroy Was Here (1983) by Styx "just didn't go far enough," and highly rated the stage performance: "Folks [...] owe it to themselves to check out the band's self-titled CD. Better yet, go to the show."

The album gained supporters from fans of the Mega Man games and music listeners in general. The success of the album led to a cult following for the band, with fans attending concerts in costumes inspired by the band's storyline and participating by way of singing along with the band's music, which was further exemplified by the group's work in Act II: The Father of Death. The Protomen toured extensively, and shows frequently sold out. In 2007, the Protomen were one of Nashville's highest paid novelty acts.

== Legacy ==
In 2012, video game magazine Pushstart praised the album as "one of the most interesting albums, or sagas, related to video games" and called the multimedia storytelling format "significant for the world of video games."

The Protomen appears on rock lists. In 2011, Westword ranked The Protomen at number ten out of the 20 greatest geek albums. In 2023, Ultimate Classic Rock placed the album among forty of the most important rock operas.

== Track listing ==
All tracks written and composed by the Protomen.

No.	Title	Length
1.	"I: Hope Rides Alone"	5:08
2.	"IIa: Funeral for a Son"	2:37
3.	"IIb: Unrest in the House of Light"	3:31
4.	"III: The Will of One"	4:09
5.	"IV: Vengeance"	3:16
6.	"V: The Stand (Man or Machine)"	5:57
7.	"VI: The Sons of Fate"	8:12
8.	"Epilogue: Due Vendetta"	4:03

== Personnel ==
All music and lyrics by the Protomen. Credits from the CD liner notes.

=== The Protomen ===
- Commander
- Murphy
- Panther
- Heath Who Hath No Name
- Demon Barber
- Scartoe
- Doug Fetterman

=== Additional personnel ===
- M. Putsi
- A. Smith
- J. Hughey
- P. Matteson
- Human Choir
- D. Jellema
- J. Colley
- J. Arnold
- J. Craig
- K. Williams
- S. Anderson
- S. Keen
- Grand Palace
- CRT
- C. Gilloy
- J. Eason
- J. Tarrents
- N. Bishop
- J. Martin
- C. Plato

== See also ==
- List of dystopian music
