= List of Georgian television series =

Here is a list of Georgian television series by years.

No.	Title	National title	Director	Season	Original release		Network
No.	Title	National title	Director	Season	First aired	Last aired	Network
== 1972 ==
1	The Bridge	ხიდი	Mikheil Thumanishvili	1 season, 2 episodes	1972	1972	
== 1974 ==
2	Night Visit	ღამის ვიზიტი	Nikoloz Sanishvili	1 season, 7 episodes	1974	1974	
== 1978 ==
3	Data Tutashkhia	დათა თუთაშხია	Grigol Lortkiphanidze; Guram Gabeskiria	1 season, 7 episodes	1978	1978	
== 1979 ==
4	The Goal	მიზანი	Geno Khojava	1 season, 2 episodes	1979	1979	
5	Marriage in Imereti	ქორწინება იმერულად	Neli Nenova; Geno Tsulaia	1 season, 2 episodes	1979	1979	
== 1981 ==
6	Vine Blossom	ვაზის ყვავილობა	Giorgi Kakhabrishvili	1 season, 5 episodes	1981	1981	
== 1983 ==
	The Book of Oath	წიგნი ფიცისა	Giga Lortkipanidze, Amiran Darsavelidze	1 season, 5 episodes	1983	1983	
== 1984 ==
7	Monday Is a Simple Day	ორშაბათი ჩვეულებრივი დღეა	Valerian Kvachadze	1 season, 2 episodes	1984	1984	
== 1990 ==
8	The Spiral	სპირალი	Giuli Chokhonelidze	1 season, 4 episodes	1990	1990	
== 1992 ==
9	The Golden Spider	ოქროს ობობა	Mikheil Antadze; Davit Kvirtskhelia; Gogi Kavtaradze	1 season, 4 episodes	1992	1992	
10	The Trap	ხაფანგი	Aleko Ninua	1 season, 2 episodes	1992	1992	
== 1994 ==
11	House in the Old District	სახლი ძველ უბანში	Malkhaz Aslamazshvili; Davit Tsintsadze	1 season, 4 episodes	1994	1994	Georgian Public Broadcasting; Imedi TV; Starvision TV
== 1999 ==
12	Thin Star Night	წვრილ ვარსკვლავთა ღამე	Andro Enukidze; Koba Tshkaxaia	1 season, 45 episodes	1999	1999	Georgian Public Broadcasting
== 2000 ==
13	Before Sleep	ძილის წინ	Otar Shamatava; Basa Photskhishvili]]	1 season, episodes	2000	2000	
== 2003 ==
14	Hot Dog	ცხელი ძაღლი	Zaza Urushadze; Irakli Badurashvili	5 season, 56 episodes	20 September 2003		Imedi TV; Silk Universal
15	27 Dragon	27 დრაკონი	Beso Giorgobiani; Tsiso Tskhvediani	1 season, 82 episodes	2003	2003	Imedi TV
16	It Gets Light Late	თენდება გვიან	Levan Eristavi	1 season, 12 episodes	2003	2003	Imedi TV
17	The Wolf Flock	მგლების ხორუმი	Badri Pullariani; Zaza Khalvashi	1 season, 12 episodes	14 February 2003	2003	Imedi TV
18	Coffee and Beer	ყავა და ლუდი	Zaza BuadzeNodar; Marshanishvili	4 season, 40 episodes	5 October 2003	2003	Imedi TV
== 2004 ==
19	The Taste of Dust	მტვრის გემო	Dato Janelidze; Marina Kulumbegashvili	1 season, 97 episodes	25 November 2004	6 December 2004	Imedi TV
20	Oh Friends	ეჰ მეგობრებო	Dato Janelidze; Marina Kulumbegashvili	2 season, 46 episodes	20 September 2004	23 September 2004	Imedi TV
== 2006 ==
21	Boys and Girls	ბიჭები და გოგონები	Rati Ramishvili	3 season, 18 episodes	6 October 2006	2006	Mze TV
22	Asa	ასა	Lasha Tseriashvili	2 season	6 October 2006	2006	Mze TV
23	Atagenus	ატაგენუსი	Dato Janelidze	1 season, 8 episodes	2006	2006	Imedi TV; Silk Universal
== 2007 ==
24	In the Middle of the City	შუა ქალაქში	Gocha Korkhelauri	16 season, 380 episodes	23 September 2007	9 July 2013	Imedi TV
25	Paper Bullet	ქაღალდის ტყვია	Marina Kulimbegashvili	1 season, 17 episodes	12 March 2007	28 March 2007	Rustavi 2
== 2008 ==
26	Our Office	ჩვენი ოფისი	Rati Ramishvili	1 season, 28 episodes	4 February 2008	10 September 2008	Rustavi 2
27	Third Generation	მესამე თაობა		1 season			Georgian Public Broadcasting
28	Generation of Chips	ჩიფსების თაობა	Giorgi Liponava; Rati Ramishvili	1 season	19 September 2008	23 July 2008	Rustavi 2
== 2009 ==
29	1005 Days of Independence	დამოუკიდებლობის 1005 დღე	Levan Akhobadze; Giorgi Molodinashvili	1 season, 6 episodes	15 May 2009	19 June 2009	Georgian Public Broadcasting
30	Clinic	კლინიკა	Giorgi Liponava; Marina Kulumbegashvili	1 season, 14 episodes	10 November 2009	28 January 2010	Imedi TV
31	The Time of Flowering	ჟამი ყვავილობისა	Lasha Tseriashvili; Beka Tsintsadze	1 season, 59 episodes	12 October 2009	31 December 2010	Rustavi 2
== 2010 ==
32	The Guntsadzes Live Here	აქ ცხოვრობენ გუნცაძეები	Giorgi Liponava	1 season, 23 episodes	17 June 2010	17 September 2010	Rustavi 2
33	Detectives	დეტექტივები	Lasha Tseriashvili	2 season, 32 episodes	8 October 2010	3 July 2011	Rustavi 2
34	K 17	კ 17	Giorgi Kikalishvili	1 season, 12 episodes			Georgian Public Broadcasting
35	The Juror	ნაფიცი მსაჯული	Giorgi Liponava	1 season, 3 episodes	2010	2010	Rustavi 2
36	The Girl from the Suburbs	გოგონა გარეუბნიდან	David Gogichaishvili; Irakli Kakabadze	5 season, 59 episodes	24 May 2010	30 December 2011	Imedi TV
== 2011 ==
37	My Wife's Girlfriends	ჩემი ცოლის დაქალები	Giorgi Liponava	17	2011	present	Rustavi 2 (2011-2019); Formula TV (2019- Present)
38	Neighbors	მეზობლები	David Imedashvili	1 season, 2 episodes	25 April 2011	26 April 2011	Rustavi 2
== 2012 ==
39	Cherry Street 12	ალუბლების ქუჩა 12	Avto Margvelashvili; Davit Lomsadze	1 season, 14 episodes	2 June 2012	13 October 2012	Rustavi 2
40	Suburban Girl MedER	გოგონა გარეუბნიდან მედER	David Chabashvili	2 season, 25 episodes	7 February 2012	21 September 2012	Imedi TV
41	Wine Way	ღვინის გზა	Arvidas Shlapikas; Raymondas Bannionis; Marina Koulumbegashvili	1 season, 46 episodes	2 February 2012	13 March 2012	Imedi TV
== 2013 ==
42	Cocktail	კოქტეილი		3 season, 58 episodes	30 May 2013	14 June 2014	Comedy Channel
43	Keti and Kote	ქეთი და კოტე		1 season, 27 episodes	5 January 2013	8 August 2014	Comedy Channel
44	Natia and Natia	ნათია და ნათია	Misha Mshvildadze	1 season, 23 episode	5 January 2013	8 August 2013	Rustavi 2
45	Our Story	ჩვენი ამბავი	Paata Meishvili	1 season, 29 episodes	14 September 2013	12 December 2013	Imedi TV
46	Don't Panic	პანიკის გარეშე	Levan Dabrundashvili	2 season, 15 episodes	20 December 2013	29 May 2014	GDS TV
== 2014 ==
47	Tiflis	ტიფლისი	Levan Dabrundashvili; Nodar Marshanishvili	2 season, 17 episodes	24 October 2014	2015	GDS TV
48	10 years later	10 წლის შემდეგ	Gocha Korkhelauri	6 season, 121 episodes	13 October 2014	25 March 2017	Imedi TV
49	Till Sunrise	გათენებამდე		1 season, 4 episodes	18 April 2014	14 May 2014	TV 11
50	Station 9	განყოფილება No. 9	Kakha Efremidze	1 season, 11 episodes	26 September 2014	8 December 2014	Comedy Channel
51	One Step	ერთი ნაბიჯი	David Chabashvili	1 season, 16 episodes	16 October 2014	15 December 2014	TV 11
52	Clinical Death	კლინიკური სიკვდილი	David Chabashvili	1 season, 6 episodes	7 March 2014	4 April 2014	TV 11
53	Paradox	პარადოქსი	Levan Bakhia; Zura Menteshashvili	2 season, 13 episodes	26 January 2014	9 November 2014	GDS TV
54	Psychopath Games	ფსიქოპათთა თამაშები	Otar Shamatava	1 season, 10 episodes	2 November 2014	30 December 2014	Imedi TV
55	Womens	ქალები		1 season, 4 episodes	11 February 2014	28 February 2014	TV 11
56	Mistake	შეცდომა		1 season, 4 episodes	21 May 2014	28 May 2014	TV 11
57	Peppers	წიწაკები		1 season, 5 episodes	2014	2014	Comedy Channel
== 2015 ==
58	With Us	ჩვენ გვერდით	David Chabashvili; Giorgi Japaridze; Giorgi Kapanadze	1 season, 120 episodes	21 September 2015	21 January 2016	TV 11; Maestro (TV channel)
59	Chefs	მზარეულები	Irakli Chkhikvadze	3 season, 56 episodes	13 October 2015	1 April 2017	GDS TV
60	Kerch – The Lost Heroes	ქერჩი – დაკარგული გმირები	Levan Dabrundashvili	1 season, 7 episodes	6 December 2015	20 January 2016	GDS TV
61	Wives and Husbands	ცოლები და ქმრები	Bacho Kajaia	2 seasons, 115 episodes	2015	2016	GDS TV
== 2016 ==
62	Nika and Lika	ნიკა და ლიკა		2 seasons, 33 episodes	23 April 2016	25 May 2016	Comedy Channel; Marao TV
63	Artificial Breathing	ხელოვნური სუნთქვა	Giorgi Liponava; Rati Ramishvili; Misha Mshvildadze	2 seasons, 50 episodes	8 June 2016	29 December 2016	Rustavi 2
64	Herocracy	ჰეროკრატია	Giorgi Khaindrava	2 season, 24 episodes	2016	2016	Imedi TV; GDS TV; Obieqtvi
65	Airless place	უჰაერო სივრცე		1 season, 4 episodes	6 December 2016	26 December 2016	Momavali TV
== 2017 ==
66	Big Break	დიდი შესვენება	David Chabashvili	1 season, 28 episodes	14 November 2017	16 January 2018	Imedi TV
67	Elite help	ელიტარული დახმარება	Giorgi Japaridze	1 season, 6 episodes	20 September 2017	10 October 2017	TV Pirveli
68	Tlinkins	ტლიკინები		1 season, 8 episodes	22 June 2017	13 March 2018	Momavali TV
== 2018 ==
69	Empire of the Wolves	მგლების იმპერია	Giorgi Japaridze	3 seasons, 51 episodes	15 November 2018	27 July 2019	Music Box Georgia TV
== 2019 ==
70	Perfect Mother	იდეალური დედა	Irakli Kakabadze; Nini Jalaghania	2 seasons, 80 episodes	4 March 2019	Present	Georgian Public Broadcasting
71	Vacancy position for killer	ვაკანსია მკვლელის თანამდებობაზე	Beso Solomanashvili	1 season, 12 episodes	2 June 2019	25 August 2019	Georgian Public Broadcasting
72	Tbilisi stories	თბილისური ამბები	Giorgi Kikaleishvili	1 season, 5 episodes	30 March 2019	20 April 2019	TV Pirveli
73	Crazies	საგიჟეთი	Giorgi Japaridze	1 season, 3 episodes	13 May 2019	31 May 2019	Music Box Georgia TV
74	Bloody family	სისხლიანი ოჯახი	Giorgi Japaridze	1 season, 4 episodes	15 May 2019	20 June 2019	Music Box Georgia TV
75	In a world of lies	სიცრუის სამყაროში	Giorgi Japaridze	1 season, 2 episodes	13 May 2019	29 May 2019	Music Box Georgia TV
76	Without address	მისამართის გარეშე	Vakho varazi	1 season	7 October 2019	present	Imedi TV
== 2020 ==
77	Big.Family	დიდი ოჯახი	Gocha korkhelauri	1 season, 14 episodes	29 May 2020	present	Mtavari Arkhi
