= Assemblage (composition) =

Type of text

Assemblage is a literary concept that refers to a text "built primarily and explicitly from existing texts to solve a writing or communication problem in a new context". The concept was first proposed by Johndan Johnson-Eilola (author of Datacloud) and Stuart Selber in the journal Computers & Composition in 2007. The notion of assemblages builds on remix and remix practices, which blur distinctions between invented and borrowed work. This idea predates modernism, with the quote by Edgar Allan Poe, "There is no greater mistake than the supposition that a true originality is a mere matter of impulse or inspiration. To originate, is carefully, patiently, and understandingly to combine."

== Influence ==
Johnson-Eilola and Selber write that assemblage is influenced by intertextuality and postmodernism. The authors discuss the intertextual nature of writing and assert that participation in existing discourse necessarily means that composition cannot occur separate from that discourse. They state that "productive participation involves appropriation and re-appropriation of the familiar" in a manner that conforms to existing discourse and audience expectations. In reference to intertextuality, Johnson-Eilola and Selber cite The Social Life of Information by John Seely Brown and Paul Duguid. In this book Brown and Duguid state that the meaning of and use for a text is directly influenced both by its source texts and the broader textual context in which it participates. Building upon this notion, Johnson-Eilola and Selber position assemblage as a style of composition situated within postmodernism. They state that "in a general sense, postmodern theories, and following them, cultural studies, offer a useful way of understanding assemblages (and the related process of remixing) as simultaneously social and textual structures." Johnson-Eilola and Selber suggest that texts should always be treated as assemblages since composition is often highly intertextual.

Johnson-Eilola and Selber believe that composition should be undertaken as a problem solving activity rather than a demonstration of original ideas. They write that "writing situations are, at base, problem-solving situations in one way or another," and offer assemblage as a form of problem solving that can be used alongside the creation of original text. Michael J. Michaud writes that "assemblages are ubiquitous in contemporary workplaces" where problem solving is paramount because assemblage allows authors to "meet discursive needs and to get work done." He further argues that students with workplace experience often transfer assemblage writing into the composition classroom. Assemblage allows such authors to alter existing texts and combine them with original work in order to meet the demands of a writing situation or problem.

== Remix ==
The idea of assemblages is closely tied to the practice of remix. Remix, originally referring to a reworked song, has been extended to describe any significant alteration of media, most commonly film and literature. Johnson-Eilola and Selber claim that remix "can aid invention, leverage intellectual and physical resources, and dramatize the social dimensions of composing." However, they also recognize that "remixing as a form of composition inhabits a contested terrain of creativity, intellectual property, authorship, corporate ownership, and power." While the practice of remixing is often marked by legal issues, the authors acknowledge that remix is nevertheless becoming an increasingly common creative form.

While assemblage is closely tied to remix, there are distinctions between the two. In discussing models of writing, Liane Robertson, Kara Taczak, and Kathleen Blake Yancey describe remix models of writing as "prior knowledge revised synthetically to incorporate new concepts and practices into the prior model of writing." In contrast, they define assemblage models as “grafting...isolated ‘bits’ of learning onto [a] prior structure without either recognition of differences between prior and current writing conceptions and tasks or synthesis of them." While a remix is a synthesis or incorporation of elements, an assemblage is a combination in which there are recognizable boundaries between elements.

Assemblage and remix are also related to articulation. The sociological practice of articulation, as described by Antonio Gramsci and Stuart Hall, among others, refers to the appropriation of elements of culture by various social groups. Johnson-Eilola and Selber connect assemblage, remix, and articulation as examples of meaning being situated in a specific material and social context.

== Patchwriting ==
A central characteristic of assemblages is the challenge to established notions of originality. Johnson-Eilola and Selber claim that the traditional distinction between original and plagiarized work is that original work is superior in terms of creative effort and is not derivative. They further assert that such a distinction is based upon outdated notions of "the lone genius" and is no longer practical in an academic setting. While they concede that "teachers no longer evaluate writing completely as an isolated, decontextualized artifact," Johnson-Eilola and Selber maintain "at least one set of social forces suggests to students that using citations and quotations from source materials will be valued less than their own original text, a situation that may encourage them to conceal their sources." While the current system of academic evaluation allows, and actually calls, for citation of source materials, Johnson-Eilola and Selber find that the placement of value on original work encourages students to hide sources in an attempt to demonstrate original thought. The emphasis on original work, according to Johnson-Eilola and Selber, may actually contribute to plagiarism. The authors believe that the emphasis on original work is unnecessary because "rhetorical purposes can be addressed in context by either original or borrowed/quoted texts without a hierarchy of distinction between the two."

Johnson-Eilola and Selber assert that despite shifting attitudes in academia, work produced by students at the scholastic and collegiate level is still evaluated in terms of its originality. They find fault with the current evaluative process for two reasons. First, the authors find that evaluating students for their originality is "increasingly unrealistic in our postmodern age" as this method is based on antiquated ideas of creativity. Second, they treat the idea of isolating a student's unique composition from the inspiring source materials as unrealistic and futile. For Johnson-Eilola and Selber, the ability to effectively contribute to academic or social discourse is what makes an assemblage valuable, not its "originality." Rather than claiming originality is not to be valued, the authors see it as fundamentally problematic and misleading as an evaluative concept. They suggest that academic evaluation be reconsidered with a new emphasis on affect: "What if the 'final' product a student produces—a text—is not concerned with original words or images on a page or screen but concerned primarily with assemblages of parts? Importantly, in this reconception, the assemblages do not distinguish primarily between which parts are supposed to be original and which have been found and gathered from someplace else; assemblages are interested in what works, what has social effects." In this model, the role of intertextuality is recognized as central to the composition of "new" material.

In support for their argument against the traditional view of plagiarism, Johnson-Eilola and Selber cite current critiques from other scholars. They refer to Price, who argued that plagiarism cannot be defined as a single concept, but is dependent upon the cultural practice and conventions in a given situation. They also acknowledge a presentation given by James Porter in 2006 at CCCC. In his presentation Porter described how plagiarism is sometimes encouraged in the academic community, offering examples of "ways teachers plagiarize all the time—among them, sharing syllabi (with plagiarized plagiarism statements!), using boilerplate text for administrative documents, and failing to acknowledge the bibliographic work of others." Johnson-Eilola and Selber also refer to a 1993 article by Rebecca Moore Howard on "patchwriting," which describes a technique used by new authors. Patchwriting "involves copying from a source text then deleting some words, altering grammatical structures, or plugging in one-to-one synonym-substitutes." This technique can traditionally be viewed as a form of plagiarism, but it is also considered useful for learning how to communicate within expert discourse. Johnson-Eilola and Selber reference patchwriting in an attempt to demonstrate the practical uses of otherwise "plagiaristic" practices, not to establish a connection between patchwriting and assemblage. While patchwriting can be a useful learning tool, it is completely distinct from assemblage. Assemblage is more than the systematic replacement of like terms and is closer to the artistic style of collage.

== Examples ==
- Paradox, a cut up collage assembled from words and phrases cut from magazines and glued together to form a picture of Abraham Lincoln being assassinated at Ford's Theater.
- Theater production Terminator the Second adapted the plot of Terminator 2: Judgment Day entirely using dialogue taken verbatim from the works of William Shakespeare.

== See also ==
- Remix
- Remix (book)
- Collage
- Sampling (music)
- Appropriation (art)
- Cut-up technique
- Cento (poetry)
