= Paradox (disambiguation) =

A paradox is a self-contradictory or counter-intuitive statement or argument.

Paradox may also refer to:

== Places ==
- Paradox, New York, a hamlet near Schroon, in Essex County, New York, United States
- Paradox Lake, a lake in Schroon, Essex County, New York, United States
- Paradox Valley, a valley in Colorado, United States
  - Paradox, Colorado, an unincorporated town in Paradox Valley
  - Paradox Basin, named after Paradox Valley
  - Paradox Formation, a geological formation deriving its name from Paradox Valley

== People ==
- Paradox (musician) (born 1972), British drum and bass musician
- Giulio Trogli (1613–1685), Italian Baroque painter who was known as il Paradosso ("the Paradox")

== Science and technology ==
- Category:Mathematical paradoxes
  - Paradoxes of set theory
- Paradox (database), a relational-database-management system
- Paradox (theorem prover), an automated theorem-proving system
- Paradox (warez), a software-cracking warez/demogroup
- Paradox, a human-powered vehicle that competed in the Australian HPV Super Series in 2011 and 2013
- Physical paradox, an apparent contradiction in physical descriptions of the universe

== Arts, entertainment, and media ==
=== Fictional entities ===
- Paradox, a character appearing in the comic book series Marvel Preview
- Paradox, the villain in the movie Yu-Gi-Oh! Bonds Beyond Time
- Faction Paradox, a fictional group in the Doctor Who universe
- Professor Paradox, a recurring character in the Ben 10 franchise
- Paradox Pokémon, a group of Pokémon appeared in Pokémon Scarlet and Violet

=== Music ===
==== Groups ====
- Paradox (Canadian band), a Canadian rock band that existed from 1984 to 1991
- Paradox (German band), a German thrash metal band formed in 1986
- Paradox (Irish band), an Irish alternative rock band formed in 1996
- Paradox (Thai band), a Thai alternative rock band formed in 1996
- Paradox (British band), a Christian black metal band
- The Paradox (band), an American pop punk band

==== Albums ====
- Paradoks, by Ahmet Koç
- Paradox (Balzac album), 2009
- Paradox (John Kay and Steppenwolf album), 1984
- Paradox (Nanase Aikawa album), 1997
- Paradox (Royal Hunt album), 1997
- Paradox (Isyana Sarasvati album), 2017

==== Songs ====
- "Paradox", by Kansas on the 1977 album Point of Know Return
- "Paradox" (Mari Hamada song), 1991
- "Paradox", by Hypocrisy on the 1996 album Abducted
- "Paradox", by Hawkwind on the 2000 live album Atomhenge 76
- "Paradox", by Keith Jarrett on the 2002 album Always Let Me Go
- "Paradox", by Sepultura on the 2009 album A-Lex
- "Paradox", a song from the soundtrack for the 2010 film 4.3.2.1

=== Films ===
- Paradox (2010 film), a 2010 Canadian science-fiction film starring Kevin Sorbo
- Paradox (2016 film), an American sci-fi / action film
- Paradox (2017 film), a Hong Kong action film
- Paradox (2018 film), a film directed by Daryl Hannah
  - Paradox (soundtrack), a soundtrack album by Neil Young and Promise of the Real

=== Television ===
- Paradox (British TV series), a 2009 British science-fiction, police-drama series
- Paradox (2014 TV series), a Georgian-Ukrainian horror thriller series
- "Paradox" (12 Monkeys), a 2015 episode
- "Paradox", a season 4 episode of Art:21
- "Paradox" (The Flash), a 2016 episode

=== Other arts, entertainment, and media ===
- Paradox (assemblage), artwork by Christian Verdun
- Paradox (literature), a literary device
- Paradox (magazine), a historical fiction magazine

== Brands and enterprises ==
- Paradox Development Studio, a video-game developer and subsidiary of Paradox Interactive
- Paradox Interactive, a video-game publisher
- Paradox Press, a defunct division of DC Comics

== Other uses ==
- Paradox gun a shotgun (usually smoothbore) with partially rifled barrels
- Paradox (horse) (1882–1890), a British Thoroughbred racehorse and sire
- Paradox, an English ship that participated in the Battle of the Kentish Knock
- The Paradox, a South Baltimore dance club

== See also ==
- List of paradoxes
