= List of television stations in Georgia =

List of television stations in Georgia may refer to:

- List of television stations in Georgia (U.S. state)
- Television in Georgia (country)
