= My Wife's Girlfriends =

- Genre: Satire
- Created by: Formula Creative
- Starring: Nino Gachechiladze; Ana Tkebuchava; Maka Dzagania; Giorgi Bakhutashvili Bakhva Bregvadze; Salome Sharvadze; Vika Kalandia; Medea Lortkipanidze; Leo Antadze; Nino Kasradze
- Country of origin: Georgia
- Original language: Georgian
- No. of seasons: 19
- No. of episodes: 928

Production
- Running time: Approx. 20-40 Minutes (per episode)

Original release
- Network: Rustavi 2 (2011-2019); Formula TV (2019-2024)
- Release: November 26, 2011 – February 3, 2024

My Wife's Girlfriends (Georgian: ჩემი ცოლის დაქალები) is a Georgian TV series, which aired from 2011 to 2024.

== Synopsis ==
The series describes the different childhood friends, the carefree Kato, the housewife Nina and the Feminist Tina's life. In the third and the fifth seasons, Natashka and Anka join the TV series.

== Characters ==
=== Kato Kirvalidze (Nino Gachechiladze) ===
Kato Kirvalidze is viewed as an "easy" girl to seduce because of her different adventures. (She was married 3 times and she had a lot of boyfriends). She has a daughter with her ex-husband Kote, a soldier. Her parents are divorced. Her father lives in Russia with his daughter, Vika, and her mother works in the US. She is very gullible (for example : Barbare, her lover Maksime's future wife proposed to her to punish Maksime, but at the end, she was punished). In Season 14 her parents married again.

=== Nina Gurabanidze (Ana Tkebuchava) ===
Nina is a Georgian housewife who has 5 children. Nina is married to Dato. She lives with her family, but she wants to become more independent. She is extremely jealous. Her parents live in Saguramo. She has cancer.

=== Tina Bregvadze (Maka Dzagania) ===
Tina is a passionate feminist and an accomplished woman who puts a particular focus on her career. She always gives advice to her friends (in most of cases to Kato) in hard moments and often is portrayed as a judgmental friend among the three. She lives with her mother, Neliko. She had a lot of relationships, but all have failed. Tina became a secondary character when she went to Budapest to study.

=== Natashka (Eka Demetradze) ===
Natashka is an old friend of Kato, Nina and Tina who lived in Gonio. One day, she decided to move to Tbilisi with her sons. Natashka's ex-husband was violent towards her and has forbidden her a lot of things, but she divorced him. She was also in a relationship with Sandro, who cheated on her. but still contacts Nina. She has not appeared on the show since the 10th season.

=== Anka Gabrichidze (Tina Makharadze) ===
Anka is the new friend of Kato, Nina and Tina. She is Nina's and Keti's neighbour. She has one daughter with her ex-boyfriend, Mishka ("Birjeli", literally meaning "Street guy") called Taso, who is friends with Nina's daughter Taso. She is a cheater. She was in a relationship with Tsotne, a politician, a rapper and others. She comes from an aristocratic family. She made her last appearance in 11th season.

=== Dato Gotsiridze (Levan Kochiashvili) ===
Dato is Nina's Husband. He likes to eat in the restaurant with his friends. He cheated on Nina with Natia and has a daughter with her. He has six children (three sons and three daughters). He is an architect, and doesn't want Nina to work. Dato is about 38 years old. His wife, Nina has cancer.

== Cast ==
- Levan Kochiashvili - Dato Gotsiridze
- Ana Tkebuchava - Nina Gurabanidze
- Salome Sharvadze - Keti
- Giorgi BakhutaShvili - Cotne Cotashvili
- Bakhva Bregvadze - Bakhva
- Nino Kasradze - Maka Anjafaridze
- Vika Kalandia - Tika
- Giorgi Barbakadze - Jeko Gotsiridze
- Keta Orbeladze - Taso Gotsiridze
- Marie Karkashadze - Elene Managadze
- Nino Gachechiladze - Kato Kirvalidze
- Maka Dzagania - Tina Bregvadze
- Baia Dvalishvili - Neliko Maisuradze
- Merab Ninidze
- Nanuka Gulua - Dochi Alishbaia
- Ana Chiradze - Chika Medzmariashvili
- Eka Amirejibi - Likuna Kirvalidze
- Nata Berejiani - Nato Kakachia
- Marishka Javakhidze - Barbare Mantkava
- Tina Makharadze - Anka Gabrichidze
- Nino Mumladze - Natia
- Ia Vakhania - Vika Kirvalidze
- Giorgi Makharadze - Maksime gobronidze
- Eka Chkeidze - Kata Jikia
- Sandro Kakulia - Sanderex
- Kote tolordava - Dito sharashenidze
- Eka demetradze - Natashka

== See also ==
- Television in Georgia
