= Khalvashi =

Khalvashi (Georgian: ხალვაში) is a Georgian surname. Notable people with the surname include:

- Kibar Khalvashi (born 1963), Georgian businessman
- Sopho Khalvashi (born 1986), Georgian musician of Laz heritage
