= Innovation Exchange =

Open innovation vendor

Innovation Exchange Inc.
- Company type: Private
- Industry: Open innovation services
- Founded: 2006
- Headquarters: Toronto, Ontario, Canada
- Website: www.innovationexchange.com

Innovation Exchange Inc. (IX) was an open innovation vendor. IX operates a website which acts as a platform for companies and non-profit organizations to present innovation challenges to a community of innovators. This community is constituted of individuals as well as small and midsize businesses. In contrast to vendors focused primarily on innovation in the physical sciences, Innovation Exchange fosters product, service, process and business model development.

== Business model ==
IX's business model takes its inspiration from the work on open innovation and crowdsourcing performed by John Seely Brown (who sits on IX's advisory board), John Hagel III, Henry Chesbrough, Wim Vanhaverbeke, Joel West and Scott E. Page. Open innovation is increasingly seen as a key mechanism for developing innovations.

IX acts as an "innovation intermediary", meaning that it functions to match organizations seeking innovative products, services, processes or business models ("sponsors") with individuals and organizations offering such innovations ("innovators").

The mechanism for this intermediation is a "challenge brief", a short document, typically three to five pages, which provides background information about the innovation being sought and enumerates the elements that a response must include. IX provides consulting services which aid client companies to understand the nature of the innovation being sought, and to articulate that innovation challenge to the community in the form of the challenge brief.
