= Bregvadze =

Bregvadze (Georgian: ბრეგვაძე) is a Georgian surname. Notable people with the surname include:

- Bakhva Bregvadze (born 1985), Georgian TV host, actor, publisher, marketer and radio presenter
- Jaba Bregvadze (born 1987), Georgian rugby union player
- Nani Bregvadze (born 1936), Georgian Soviet singer and actress
