= Vika Kalandia =

Georgian actress, TV presenter, director, and acting coach

Vika (Veriko) Kalandia
- ვიკა კალანდია
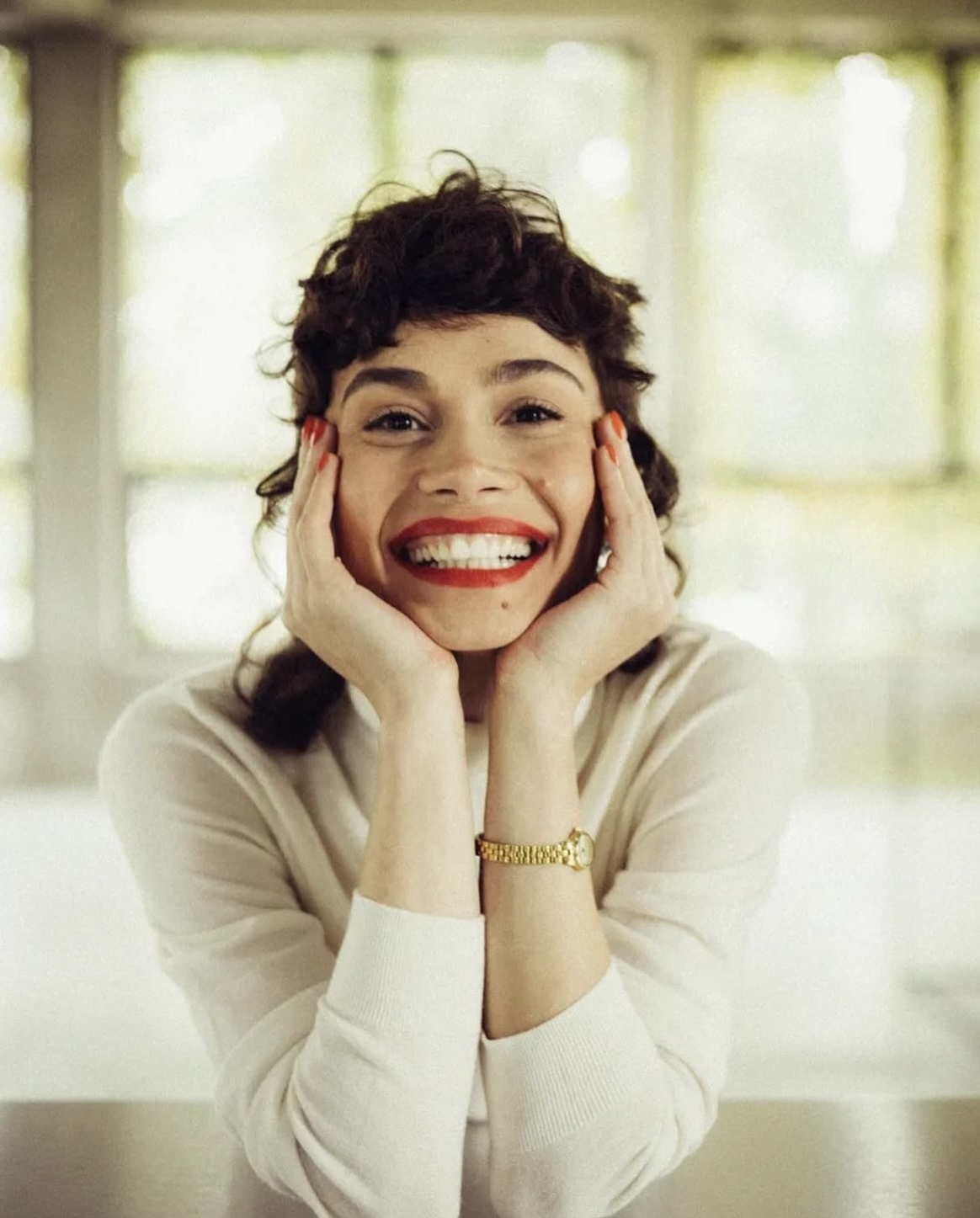
- Born: 25 October 1987 (age 38); Tbilisi, Georgia
- Occupations: Actress, television presenter, acting coach, director
- Years active: 2010–present
- Notable work: My Wife's Girlfriends, In the Middle of the City

Vika (Veriko) Kalandia (Georgian: ვიკა კალანდია; born 25 October 1987, Tbilisi) is a Georgian actress, television presenter, director, and acting coach. She is known for her work in film, television, and theatre, and gained national recognition for her roles in TV series such as My Wife's Girlfriends and In the Middle of the City. Kalandia has also hosted several shows on Georgian television, including We Are the Stars, Self Isolation, and the Day Show, which features her own segment, Vika Kalandia’s Rubric.

In 2025, she served as a jury member at the 26th Tbilisi International Film Festival.

== Biography ==
In 2010, Kalandia graduated from Shota Rustaveli Theatre and Film University, Faculty of Acting. In 2024, she completed professional training at the Professional Acting Studio NYC — Terry Knickerbocker Studio.

== Career ==
=== Television ===
Year	Title	Type	Role / Notes
2011	In the Middle of the City	TV series	
2012	Suburban Girl MedER	TV series	
2014	My Wife's Girlfriends	TV series	
2015	By Our Side	TV series	
2019	The Kingdom of Fire	TV series	

=== Films ===
Year	Title	Role / Notes
2011	5 Days of August	
2012	Crossroads	
2017	On skazal mama	

=== Theatre ===
- 2014 — Eduardo de Filippo's City of Naples of Millionaires (Maria), directed by David Sakvarelidze; Sokhumi State Drama Theatre
- 2015 — Martin McDonagh's Nabushvrebi (Maria), directed by George Kantaria; Sokhumi State Drama Theatre
- 2016 — Guram Dochanashvili's The First Garment (Konchita), directed by Lasha Oniani; Tbilisi Opera and Ballet Theatre
- 2019 — Konstantine Gamsakhurdia’s Kidnapping the Moon (Dasha), directed by Gocha Kapanadze; Sokhumi State Drama Theatre
- 2022 — Boris Akunin's Hamlet (Ophelia), directed by Irina Gachechiladze; Movement Theater
- 2023 — Tennessee Williams’ Suddenly, Last Summer (Catherine), directed by Jason Hale
- 2023 — Eugene Ionesco Rhinoceros, directed by Zurab Getsadze; Sokhumi State Drama Theatre

=== Awards ===
- 2016 — Winner of Georgia To See magazine’s Readers Choice Award

=== TV presenting ===
- 2017 — We Are the Stars on Imedi TV
- 2020 — Self Isolation on Formula TV
- Since 2021 — Day Show on Imedi TV, featuring her own segment Vika Kalandia’s Rubric

== Festival participation ==
- 2025 — Jury member, 26th Tbilisi International Film Festival
