= Paata Chakhnashvili =

Georgian social psychologist and pollster

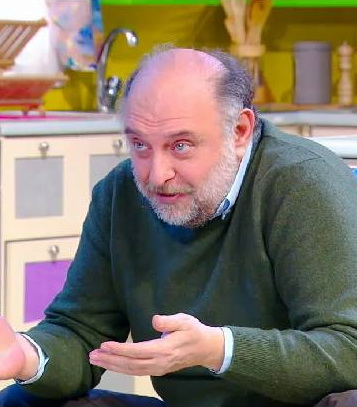
Paata Chakhnashvili - Story about body language at TV program Midday at GDS.

Paata Chakhnashvili is a social psychologist and pollster. He is known for conducting the first Exit poll in Georgia and post-Soviet countries, held during a parliamentary election in 1999 for the tele company Rustavi 2.

Chakhnashvili was born on 30 March 1957, in Tbilisi, Georgia. He completed his education in Sport Journalism and Social Psychology and has been actively engaged in teaching activities since 2011. He is a lecturer in the psychology of communication and public relations at the PR School of Georgian American University.

Chakhnashvili has held various roles in psychology and polling over his career. In 1993, he played a part in the creation of the channel "Rustavi 2" in the city of Rustavi. He has also been a consultant for various television stations in Georgia, and was involved in the publication of political ratings in the media.

In 2008, Chakhnashvili became a victim of violence and abuse during the unrest at the tele company "Imedi". He is the producer and author of the idea for the documentary film Day at Home (One Day Shin).
