= Stevenson Place =

Office building

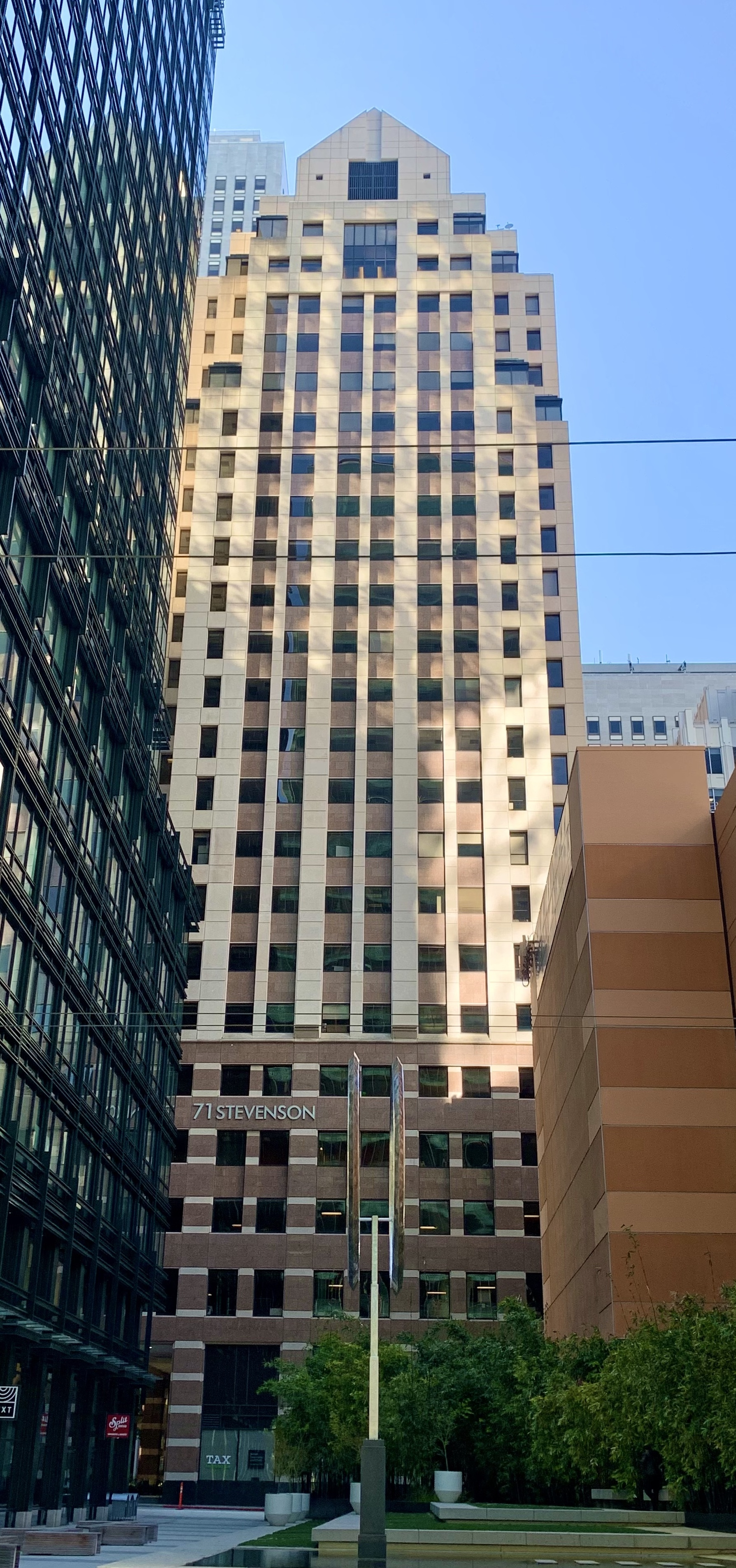
- In 2021

- Location within San Francisco

General information
- Type: Commercial offices
- Location: 71 Stevenson Street; San Francisco, California
- Coordinates: 37.7913°N 122.4013°W
- Construction started: 1985
- Completed: 1987

Height
- Roof: 103 m (338 ft)

Technical details
- Floor count: 28
- Floor area: 323,000 sq ft (30,000 m^{2})

Design and construction
- Architect: Kaplan McLaughlin Diaz
- Structural engineer: Glumac International
- Main contractor: Cahill Contractors

[[Category:Use American English from November 2026

The building was one of the first to implement San Francisco's Downtown Plan 1985 that mandated changes to high rise designs, with new bulk controls, distinctive tops, shafts and bases, holding the street wall, and creating privately owned public open space (POPOS). Project Designer was John G Ellis FAIA RIBA working with Jeff Heller and David Hobstetter.]]

Stevenson Place is a 24-story, 103 m (338 ft) Class-A office building located at 71 Stevenson Street in the Financial District of San Francisco, California. Construction of the building began in 1985 and was completed in 1987 and was designed by the architecture firm Kaplan McLaughlin Diaz. The building was the winner of the 1987 Prestressed Concrete Institute Competition.

== Tenants ==
- H5 (former tenant)
- Lending Club
- Bare Escentuals (Shiseido subsidiary)

== See also ==
- List of tallest buildings in San Francisco
