= John Seely Brown =

American researcher (born 1940)

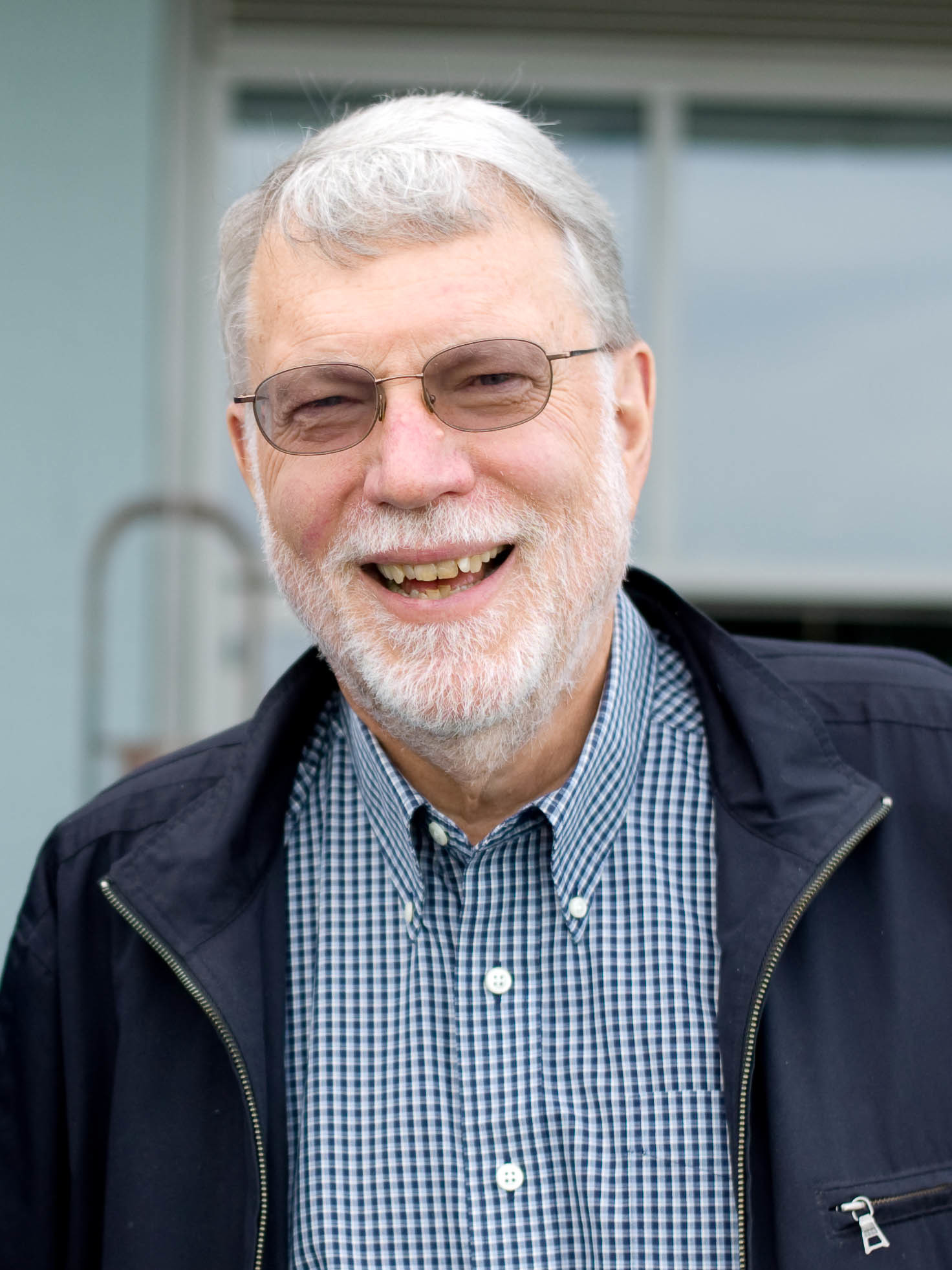
- Born: 1940 (age 85–86); Utica, New York, U.S.
- Education: Brown University; University of Michigan
- Website: johnseelybrown.com

John Seely Brown (born 1940), also known as "JSB", is an American researcher who specializes in organizational studies with a particular bent towards the organizational implications of computer-supported activities. Brown was director of Xerox PARC from 1990 to 2000 and chief scientist at Xerox from 1992 to 2002; during this time the company played a leading role in the development of numerous influential computer technologies. Brown is the co-author of The Social Life of Information, a 2000 book which analyzes the adoption of information technologies.

== Early life ==
John Seely Brown was born in 1940 in Utica, New York.

Brown graduated from Brown University in 1962 with degrees in physics and mathematics. He received a Ph.D. from the University of Michigan in computer and communication sciences in 1970.

== Career ==
His research interests include the management of radical innovation, digital culture, ubiquitous computing, autonomous computing and organizational learning. JSB is also the namesake of the John Seely Brown Symposium on Technology and Society, held at the University of Michigan School of Information. The first JSB symposium in 2000 featured a lecture by Stanford Professor of Law Lawrence Lessig, titled "Architecting Innovation," and a panel discussion, "The Implications of Open Source Software," featuring Brown, Lessig and the William D. Hamilton Collegiate Professor of Complex Systems at SI, Michael D. Cohen. Subsequent events were held in 2002, 2006 and 2008.

He has held several positions and roles, including:

- Independent co-chair of the Deloitte Center for Edge Innovation (present)
- Senior fellow, Annenberg Center for Communication at USC (present)
- Chief scientist of Xerox Corporation (1992 – April 2002)
- Director of the Xerox PARC research center (1990 – June 2000)
- Cofounder of the Institute for Research on Learning
- Board member of multiple companies, including Amazon, Corning, MacArthur Foundation and Polycom
- Advisory board member of several private companies, including Innovation Exchange and H5
- Former board member of In-Q-Tel

== Honors ==
- Founding Fellow of the Association for the Advancement of Artificial Intelligence, 1990
- IRI Medal from the Industrial Research Institute, 1999
- Design Futures Council Senior Fellow

=== Honorary degrees ===
Location	Date	Institution	Degree
Rhode Island	2000	Brown University	Honorary Doctor of Science
United Kingdom	2001	London Business School	Honorary Doctor of Science in Economics
California	2004	Claremont Graduate University	Honorary Doctor of Humane Letters
Michigan	2005	University of Michigan	Honorary Doctor of Science
North Carolina	2009	North Carolina State University	Honorary Doctor of Science
Illinois	2011	IIT Institute of Design, Illinois Institute of Technology	Honorary Doctor of Design
Singapore	2013	Singapore Management University	Honorary Doctor of Information Systems
Maine	2014	Bates College	Honorary Doctor of Science
Arizona	2015	Arizona State University	Honorary Doctor of Humane Letters
California	2018	Frederick S. Pardee RAND Graduate School	Honorary Doctor of Public Policy
New York	2019	Rochester Institute of Technology	Honorary Doctor of Humane Letters

== Publications ==
- John Seely Brown, Douglas Thomas, A New Culture of Learning: Cultivating the Imagination for a World of Constant Change, CreateSpace 2011. ISBN 9781456458881.
- John Seely Brown, Foreword, in: Toru Iiyoshi M.S. Vijay Kumar, Opening Up Education: The Collective Advancement of Education through Open Technology, Open Content, and Open Knowledge, The MIT Press 2010. ISBN 9780262515016.
- John Seely Brown, John Hagel III, Lang Davison, The Power of Pull: How Small Moves, Smartly Made, Can Set Big Things In Motion, Basic Books 2010. ISBN 9780465019359.
- John Seely Brown, John Hagel III, How World Of Warcraft Promotes Innovation; in: Willms Buhse/Ulrike Reinhard: Wenn Anzugträger auf Kapuzenpullis treffen (When Suits meet Hoodies), whois-Verlag 2009. ISBN 9783934013988.
- John Seely Brown, John Hagel III, The Only Sustainable Edge: Why Business Strategy Depends On Productive Friction And Dynamic Specialization, Harvard Business Review Press 2005. ISBN 9781591397205.
- John Seely Brown, Stephen Denning, Katalina Groh, Laurence Prusak, Storytelling in Organizations: Why Storytelling Is Transforming 21st Century Organizations and Management, Butterworth-Heinemann 2004. ISBN 9780750678209.
- John Seely Brown, John Hagel III, Out of The Box: Strategies for Achieving Profits Today and Growth Tomorrow Through Web Services, Harvard Business Press 2002. ISBN 9781578516803
- John Seely Brown, Paul Duguid, The Social Life of Information, Harvard Business Review Press 2000. ISBN 9780875847627.
- John Seely Brown (Ed.), Seeing Differently: Insights on Innovation, Harvard Business Press 1997. ISBN 9780875847559
- John Seely Brown, Research that Reinvents the Corporation, Harvard Business Review 1991.
- John Seely Brown, D. Sleemann (Eds.), Intelligent Tutoring Systems, Academic Press 1982. ISBN 9780126486810
- More than 100 papers in academic journals

== Translated work ==
- John Seely Brown, Douglas Thomas, Yeni nesil öğrenme kültürü: Sürekli değişen bir dünya için hayal gücü yetiştirmek (H. Uysal, Ed. & Trans.; A. Sığın, İ. Çelik, H. Çakmakcı, M. Özdemir, S. Bilgin, & A. Güven, Trans.), Pegem Akademi 2016 (Original work published 2011). ISBN 9786053185611
