= Terminator the Second =

2011 stage production

- Official production poster
- Original language: English
- Written by: Cody De Vos; Marshall Weber; William Shakespeare
- Based on: Terminator 2: Judgment Day by James Cameron and William Wisher Jr.; Works of William Shakespeare
- Music by: The Protomen
- Lyrics by: The Protomen
- Genre: Action, comedy, science fiction
- Setting: 1995, Los Angeles, California and a desert in Mexico

Premiere
- Date: October 14, 2011
- Place: Nashville School of the Arts, Nashville, Tennessee, United States
- Directed by: Cody De Vos; Marshall Weber
- Original run: October 14 – 17, 2011
- Archived May 24, 2016, at the Wayback Machine

Terminator the Second (sometimes referred to as William Shakespeare Presents Terminator the Second, or stylized as Terminator, the Second) is a 2011 American stage production by Husky Jackal Theatre, which adapts the plot of Terminator 2: Judgment Day performed entirely using dialogue taken verbatim from the works of William Shakespeare. Only proper nouns, pronouns and corresponding verb tenses were subject to change.

The 2011 crowdfunded production by Husky Jackal was broadly well received by critics and it had two subsequent productions by other production companies, in 2014 by Bootless Stageworks, and in 2019 by Hardly Working Productions. A DVD compiled from footage of the original four-night run was released in 2013. The production was scored by the Protomen, who also appeared as the SWAT team in the original 2011 run.

== Background ==
Terminator the Second was conceived in 2011 by Cody De Vos and Marshall Weber, the founders of the Nashville-based performance collective Husky Jackal Theatre Company. The script initially took nine months for De Vos and Weber to complete. The production was originally crowdfunded via Kickstarter, having raised more than three times its initial $3000 goal.

In an interview with Wired, Weber noted that the intent was not to mimic the language in a pop-culture parody. The production is premised on the recreating the story of Terminator 2: Judgment Day solely with lines from Shakespeare's folios – rather than an Elizabethan language adaptation. The foreword of the script notes that only proper nouns and pronouns were changed, "supplanted only by pronouns or other proper nouns", and all pronouns by other pronouns. In some cases corresponding verb tenses were modified. This format has been described by academic Travis Maynard as an assemblage, being composed entirely of other texts.

== Synopsis ==
The story of Terminator 2 is recreated directly within the production, with changes only to the dialogue.

== Production history ==
The original run of Terminator the Second was performed in Nashville, Tennessee, in 2011, with four show dates. In 2013, a DVD was released with footage from the four original performances. It was previewed at Belcourt Theatre October 22, 2013, and officially released at the Mercy Lounge November 1, 2013, at a show that included a concert performance by the Protomen.

In 2014, Bootless Stageworks produced a run of the show in Wilmington, Delaware, with seven show dates.

In 2019, Hardly Working Productions produced a run of the show for the Orlando, Florida, Fringe Festival, with six show dates.

== Cast and characters ==
Cast by production
Role	2011 Nashville (Original run)	2014 Bootless Stageworks	2019 Orlando Fringe
T-800	Jasson Cring	Tom Trietley	Matt Doman
Sarah Connor	Kahle Reardon	Melissa Kearney	Pam Stone
John Connor	Jamie Bradley	Sean McGuire	Jolie Hart
T-1000	Marshall Weber	Greg Faber	John Reid Adams

The Protomen make an appearance as the SWAT team in the original 2011 run.

== Soundtrack ==
The production was scored by the Protomen and in the original run performed by the Protomen and 84001. "Keep Quiet (John's Garage Mix)" and "Light Up the Night (2013 Remaster)" are new mixes of Protomen songs previously released as part of Act II: The Father of Death.

No.	Title	Length
1.	"Overture"	3:40
2.	"Future War (Prologue)"	2:22
3.	"Main Title (Terminator The Second Theme)"	3:06
4.	"T800 Cometh"	0:15
5.	"Guitars, Cadillacs"	3:53
6.	"T1000 Also Cometh"	1:04
7.	"Keep Quiet (John's Garage Mix)"	4:41
8.	"Ride to Pescadero"	4:35
9.	"The Chase (Part I)"	2:29
10.	"Checking Out"	2:15
11.	"The Long Night"	0:57
12.	"The Road to Mexico"	3:55
13.	"No Fate"	1:59
14.	"But What We Make"	2:57
15.	"The Nightmare"	1:48
16.	"Cyberdyne Is Besieged"	3:56
17.	"The Chase (Part II)"	1:47
18.	"Parting Is Such Sweet Sorrow"	2:55
19.	"Epilogue"	1:02
20.	"Overture (Reprise)"	3:35
21.	"Light Up the Night (2013 Remaster)"	4:23
Total length:		57:34

== Critical reception ==
io9 praised the concept, noting "nothing could be better" than a reboot of Terminator 2 using Elizabethan English. Memphis Flyer described it as an "unusual experiment" that could either be the "best thing ever" or a "disaster so epic". In response to the trailer for the DVD release, The Mary Sue noted the distinct visuals of the source material had been impressively recreated.

Orlando Sentinel gave the show a largely positive review, declaring it "far more entertaining than the movie it's spoofing." It noted the show's appeal to both Shakespearean scholars and general audiences, finding it "easy to follow" and "comedy enough". The direction elicited "perfect serious attitudes for a comedy" and commended the "top-notch" cast and "invaluable" fight choreography. The show was however mildly criticised for a brief moment where competing onstage actions distracted from a monologue.

Reviewing the 2014 Bootless Stageworks production Stage Magazine described it as a "brilliant" and "unique" with the only criticism raised being the low audience turnout. The performance's accessibility was attributed to the cast's "eloquence" and "expertise". Cast performances were highlighted, as was the inventive staging and scene changes. The News Journal described it as "funny", "clever", and "a lot of fun", though notes that understanding the story may be dependent on knowledge of the source materials, especially Terminator 2.

Orlando Weekly gave the 2019 Orlando Fringe Festival production a broadly positive assessment as an "ingenious adaptation", highlighting the depth of the script, sword choreography, cast and acting. The use of actual Shakespearean dialogue was noted as an improvement over the team's previous show, Shakespeare's Ghostbusters, if less tightly paced and visually inventive. The review also noted the stage constricting the fight sequences and the tone "straddling" between parody and tribute. Analog Artist Digital World highlighted the compatibility between the source materials and described the Fringe performance as "the most clever show" at the 2019 Fringe festival.

== See also ==
- Cento (poetry)
