= Shen shegidzlia moigo asi atasi =

- Also known as: Shen shegidzlia moigo 100 000
- Georgian: შენ შეგიძლია მოიგო ასი ათასი
- Genre: Game show
- Created by: David Briggs; Mike Whitehill; Steven Knight
- Presented by: Dato Darchia
- Theme music composer: Nick Magnus
- Composers: Keith Strachan; Matthew Strachan

Production
- Running time: 45 minutes

Original release
- Network: First Channel
- Release: March 1, 2026 – present

Related
- Vis Unda 20000? (original version)

Shen shegidzlia moigo asi atasi (Georgian: შენ შეგიძლია მოიგო ასი ათასი, English translation: You can win one hundred thousand), also known as Shen shegidzlia moigo 100 000, is a Georgian game show based on the British format of Who Wants to Be a Millionaire?. The show premiered on March 1, 2026, on the Georgian state-owned TV station First Channel, and is hosted by the actor Dato Darchia. Contestants have to answer fifteen multiple-choice questions of increasing to win the show's top prize of 100,000 Georgian lari.

== Gameplay ==
As per the original British version, contestants face a series of questions normally relating to general knowledge: common topics can also include culture, literature, music, film, television, sport, science, history and geography. Unlike both the original British version (until 2010) and the first version of this show's predecessor, Vis unda otsi atasi?, but like some other international versions including the previous Georgian version, the preliminary round known in the UK as "Fastest Finger First" is not played, and contestants simply enter the studio and sit in the hot seat after being invited to play by the host, thereby leaving only the main game.

=== Main game ===
Money tree
Question No.	Question value
1	100 ₾
2	150 ₾
3	200 ₾
4	250 ₾
5	300 ₾
6	400 ₾
7	500 ₾
8	1,000 ₾
9	2,000 ₾
10	3,000 ₾
11	6,000 ₾
12	12,500 ₾
13	25,000 ₾
14	50,000 ₾
15	100,000 ₾

In the main game, the contestant who is in the hot seat is given 15 multiple-choice questions of increasing difficulty, presented in the form of a "money tree" with questions worth between 100 ₾ and 100,000 ₾. Every time the contestant answers a question correctly, the contestant wins the corresponding amount of money that the question is worth, however the winnings are not cumulative (e.g. if the contestant were to answer the second question correctly, they would win 150 ₾, not 250 ₾). The contestant's run ends when they answer the final question correctly, give a wrong answer to any question, or make a decision not to answer a question (known as "walking away" or "taking the money"). There are two guaranteed sums: one at question 5 (300 ₾), and one at question 10 (3,000 ₾), and once the contestant correctly answers that question, they are guaranteed to leave with at least that amount (i.e. if they were to lose on questions 6–10, they would leave with 300 ₾ and if they were to lose on the last five questions, they would leave with 3,000 ₾). If the contestant were to lose before the first guaranteed sum has been reached (i.e. if they incorrectly answered one of the first five questions), they would leave with nothing. Should the contestant decide to walk away, they would leave with the value of the previous question (e.g. if they walk away on the 10th question, they would win 2,000 ₾).

=== Lifelines ===
The contestant is given three "lifelines" to help them if they get stuck on a question. Each lifeline can only be used once, and all can be used at any stage in the game. The lifelines used in this version are:

- 50:50 - removes two incorrect answers, leaving the contestant with the right answer and one remaining wrong answer
- Phone a Friend - allows the contestant to call one of their selected "friends" to see if they know the answer. A 30-second time limit is given for the contestant to read the question and its possible answers, and for the friend to answer.
- Ask Three of the Audience - the host asks members of the audience if they think that they know the answer through a show of hands, and the contestant picks three of them with no further knowledge of the audience members. These three people then state what they think the answer is.

== Broadcast ==
On February 11, 2026, First Channel released a trailer stating that Who Wants to Be a Millionaire? would return to Georgia after 15 years. On March 1, the first episode of the new version was broadcast.

== Contestants ==
The biggest winner so far (as of the 19th episode of the first season) is Monika Tsurtsumia (მონიქა ცურცუმია), who walked away on the 13th question with 12,500 ₾ on 8 March 2026.
