= Vis Unda 20000? =

Georgian television quiz show

- Logo of the second version (2009-2011)
- Also known as: Vis Unda Otsi Atasi?
- Georgian: ვის უნდა ოცი ათასი?
- Created by: David Briggs; Mike Whitehill; Steven Knight
- Presented by: Duta Skhirtladze; Mamuka Gamrelidze
- Country of origin: Georgia

Original release
- Network: Rustavi 2
- Release: September 1, 2000 – July 26, 2011

Related
- Shen shegidzlia moigo asi atasi (revival)

Vis Unda 20000? (ვის უნდა ოცი ათასი?, Who Wants Twenty Thousand?) is a Georgian game show based on the original British format of Who Wants to Be a Millionaire?. The show was hosted by Duta Skhirtladze in the original version and Mamuka Gamrelidze in the revival, and it aired on Rustavi 2.

== Rules ==
The main goal in both versions was to win 20,000 ₾ by answering 15 multiple-choice questions correctly. When a contestant gets the fifth question correct, they will leave with at least 100 ₾, or at least 1,600 ₾ (earlier 1,000 ₾) from the tenth question onwards.

== Original version (2000-2005) ==
The original version first aired on Rustavi 2 on September 1, 2000, and was presented by the actor Duta Skhirtladze (also known by his Russian name Dmitry Valitsky). The gameplay was much the same as the original British version, with a pool of contestants playing in a short qualifying round where they are asked to arrange four answers in a given order, with the fastest contestant playing in the hot seat for 20,000 ₾. This version was made on a noticeably low budget, hence the low top prize and safety net values. Indeed, this was the first version in the world to nominally refer to a prize less than a million in value, and the set was very small and (especially in the first set used until around 2003) cramped, and regularly suffered from power cuts during filming, which made filming episodes a lengthy and sometimes expensive process. Despite the cramped audience, ten contestants played in the qualifying round as per the original British version, as opposed to some versions with similarly small sets such as Nigeria that had smaller contestant pools (most commonly eight), which made the set look even more cramped than it otherwise would have been. Vis Unda 20000 The show was a great success in terms of viewer ratings across Georgia, and it was featured along with some other international versions (including the UK original) in the documentary Who Wants to Be a Millionaire?: A Global Phenomenon in 2000. It was the first Georgian adaptation of an international TV game show format, and its success prompted Rustavi 2 to commission a local adaptation of the British game show The People Versus in 2002.

== Revival (2009-2011) ==
After a four-year absence, the show returned on September 23, 2009, with new presenter Mamuka Gamrelidze, a new set and some minor changes to the money tree. This version ended on July 26, 2011, after two seasons. In this version, there was no qualifying round, and instead contestants were directly invited into the hot seat by the host.

== Second revival (2026-) ==
On February 11, 2026, fifteen years after the cancellation of the previous Georgian version of Who Wants to Be a Millionaire?, state TV channel First Channel released a trailer announcing the premiere of a new version of the programme, titled Shen shegidzlia moigo asi atasi („შენ შეგიძლია მოიგო ასი ათასი“), with an increased top prize of 100,000 ₾. This version premiered on March 1, 2026, and is hosted by actor Dato Darchia.

== Money tree ==
Payout structure
Question number	Question value	
Question number	2000–2005	2009–2011
1	20 ₾	
2	30 ₾	
3	40 ₾	
4	50 ₾	
5	100 ₾	
6	200 ₾	
7	400 ₾	
8	800 ₾	
9	1,000 ₾	1,600 ₾
10	1,500 ₾	3,000 ₾
11	3,000 ₾	4,000 ₾
12	4,000 ₾	6,000 ₾
13	5,000 ₾	8,000 ₾
14	10,000 ₾	12,000 ₾
15	20,000 ₾	

== Top prize winners ==
The show has had three top prize winners over the history of the two versions, including one couple. The first winner was Manana Maisuradze, who won 20,000 ₾ in 2001. On February 22, 2011, the grand prize was won by chess grandmaster Garry Kasparov and his wife, Daria Kasparova. This episode was mainly in Russian with Georgian subtitles.

== See also ==
- Shen shegidzlia moigo 100 000 (revival of the show on a different channel with a different name)
