= Mze TV =

Georgian television channel

- Country: Georgia

Programming
- Picture format: 16:9

Ownership
- Owner: Saba Mantidze (since 2016)

History
- Launched: 2003 / 2016
- Founder: Saba Mantidze (since 2016)
- Closed: 2013

Links
- Website: tvmze.ge

Mze TV (Georgian: მზე) was a Georgian television channel, launched in 2003 by Vano Chkhartishvili, a Georgian millionaire and member of the Georgian parliament from 1999 until 2007. He served as Economy Minister under President Eduard Shevardnadze from November 2001-November 2003.

By 2004 Mze (meaning ‘Sun’) was one of Georgia's leading channels, broadcasting a variety of content including popular political talk shows.

However, over the course of the next few years Chkhartishvili sold all his shares in the company and it became the focus of concern for opposition politicians and independent commentators who suggested Mze was coming under pressure from the Georgian government for failing to keep in line politically. It eventually became wholly owned by Rustavi 2, another leading television company, and moved to broadcasting a programme of entertainment without any news coverage.

== Transfer of shares in Mze ==
In July 2004 Georgian newspaper Rezonansi (Resonance) reported that Chkhartishvili sold shares in MZE to a fellow Georgian MP and ally of president Mikheil Saakashvili, David Bezhuashvili because he (Chkhartishvili) had fallen out of favour with Saakashvili's government and was trying to avoid arrest for financial abuses. In a subsequent article the same newspaper reported that the shares sold by Chkhartishvili to Bezhuashvili amounted to 50% of the company.

In January 2006 it was reported that Rustavi 2 (by this time wholly owned by a close ally of the then Georgian defence minister) bought 78% of shares in Mze, the remaining 22% being retained by Bezhaushvili via his company SakCementi. It was also reported that as a result of the deal, Mze would become an entertainment channel.

== Cessation of political programming ==
The first concerns over possible government interference with the editorial independence of Mze came in 2004, when opposition politicians raised the alarm, suggesting that Mze, along with Georgia's other leading independent TV station at the time, Rustavi 2, had cancelled political talk shows at the government's behest. This was denied by the then Parliamentary Chairperson, Nino Burjanadze, who said she believed that the broadcasters had cancelled the programmes in question in order to ‘launch new projects’.

In July 2005 Mze announced it would take its daily political talk show Archevanis Zgvarze (On the Edge of Choice) off air. It was reported that Irakli Imnaishvili, the show's anchor, announced on air on July 6 that his show would go out for the last time on July 8. Apparently this move came days after a key government member, Giga Bokeria, criticised Mze's coverage of civil unrest in Tbilisi, criticism which led opposition parliamentarians to accuse the government of putting pressure on independent media, which was in turn denied by the government. Mze put the withdrawal of the political talk show down to planned changes in broadcasting schedules. But the same report also said that On the Edge of Choice had been temporarily cancelled earlier that year after experts invited on to the programme failed to corroborate the official explanation for the death of Prime Minister Zurab Zhvania.

In 2008 it was announced that Mze would cease broadcasting news programmes due to a planned reorganization.

== Commentary on Mze from Georgian and international watchdogs and the US Department of State ==
In its 2005 Country Report (Georgia) on Human Rights Practices the US Department of State said that government pressure on the media had been reported. It noted Mze's cancellation of On the Edge of Choice and observed that the programme was often critical of the government. The cancellation, it said, ‘occurred shortly after an influential parliamentarian appeared on the show and criticized comments made by the program host. The government denied any connection with the cancellation.’

In its 2007 Country Report on Human Rights Practices in Georgia the State Department noted that, ‘Observers believed that some members of the government directed pro-government television stations, notably Rustavi-2 and Mze, to provide positive coverage of the government.’

The cancellation of On The Edge Of Choice was also recorded in Freedom House's 2006 report on freedom of the press in Georgia. Its 2009 report on the same subject observed that ever since the government forced independent TV station Imedi off air in 2007 the authorities had sought to ensure the leading independent television channels were controlled by government allies. ‘As a result, stations such as Rustavi 2, Mze, and Imedi TV—which resumed broadcasting in September under a new owner—have maintained a strong progovernment line’, the report commented.

On 3 May 2004 the International Federation of Human Rights, an umbrella group of 164 human rights organisations worldwide, declared its concern over restrictions on the media in Georgia in an open letter to the country's authorities. It discussed the unexpected February cancellation of Mze's ‘highly rated’ political talk show, ‘Night Mzera’ hosted by Inga Grigolia. It disputed the claims of a Mze representative that the cancellation was temporary, saying that Grigolia had already quit the channel. The letter also linked that cancellation with Rustavi 2's cancellation of its popular political talk show on the same day.

In a 2005 article about Georgia entitled Opposition Politics, the British Helsinki Human Rights Group commented that Mze had been prevented from broadcasting the funerals of Georgian troops who had died in a ‘debacle’ in Georgia's breakaway region of South Ossetia and that the station had been censured about its reporting of Prime Minister Zhvania's death.

The Human Rights Centre, a Georgian non-governmental organisation, published an extensive report on the situation of the Georgian media from 2003 to 2007 called 'Putinization of Georgia: Georgian media after the Rose Revolution'. In the report the authors suggested that the ‘reorganisation’ of Mze, with news programmes being cancelled, might possibly be connected to the channel's live broadcast of a raid on a protest rally in Tbilisi's city centre.

== Status now ==
Vano Chkhartishvili now lives in London. He has founded another television company, Mzera and has announced the launch of a campaign to reclaim Mze.
