= David Gogichaishvili =

Georgian television personality (born 1975)

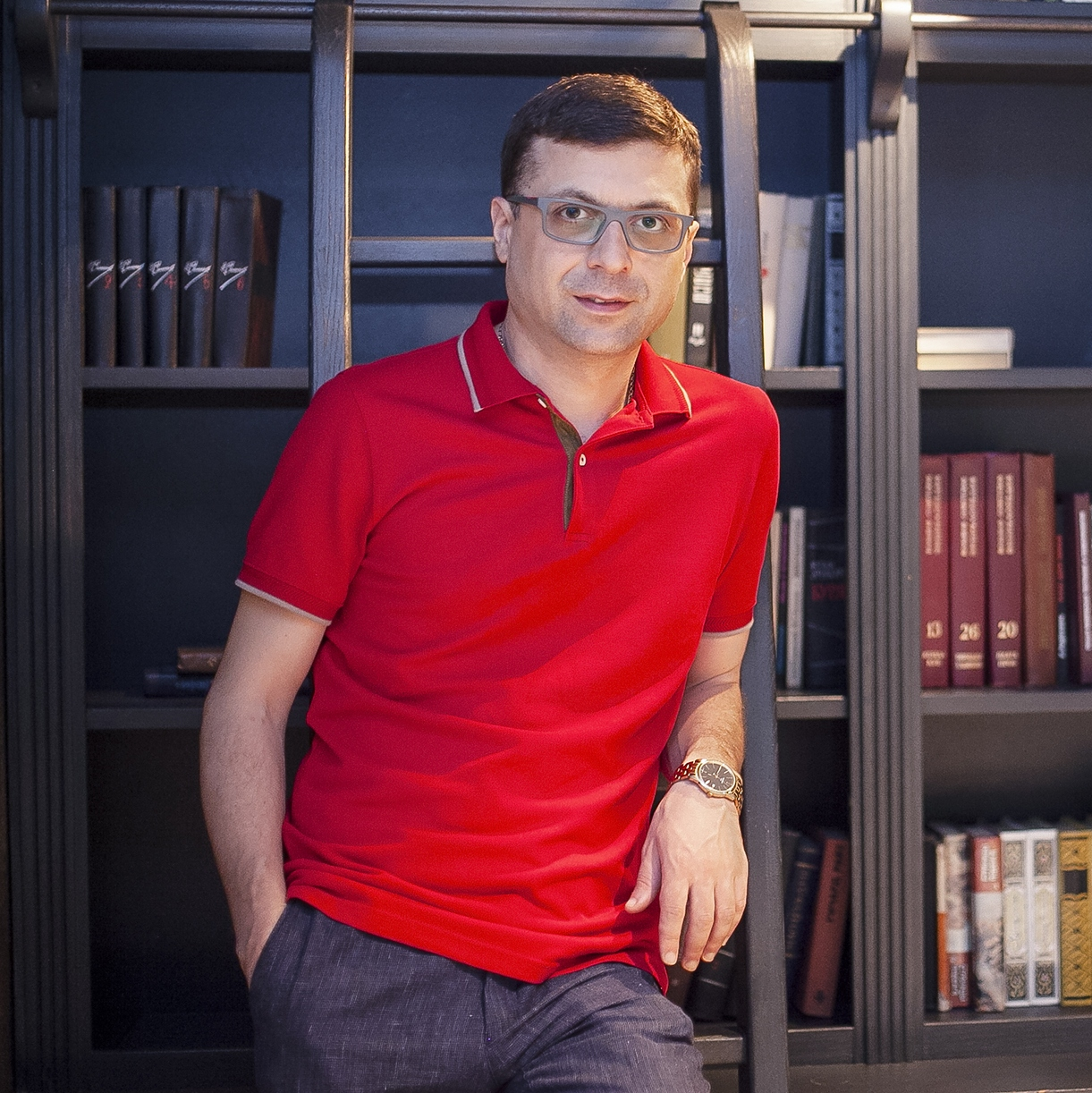
- Born: David Gogichaishvili; 23 December 1975 (age 49); Tbilisi, Georgian SSR, Soviet Union
- Occupation(s): Business Consultant, People Management Trainer, Television Personality

David Gogichaishvili (Georgian: დავით გოგიჩაიშვილი; born 23 December 1975) is a Georgian television personality.

== Early life and education ==
David Gogichaishvili was born on 23 December 1975 in Tbilisi, Georgia. He graduated from I. Vekua 42nd high school (profile Physics and Mathematics).

Gogichaishvili went on to study at Tbilisi State University majoring in Finances and Banking and graduated with a bachelor's degree in 1997. Afterwards, he graduated from the Faculty of Western Languages and Literature, majoring in English Language and Literature at Tbilisi State University in 2001. He also studied at University of Pennsylvania (introduction studies to specialty, certificate) (2001) and graduated from Ohio University School of Telecommunications majoring in Media Management with master's degree in 2003. David Gogichaishvili graduated from Erasmus University Rotterdam School of Management with Global One Executive BA degree in 2011.

== Career ==
Gogichasishvili's professional career started in 1994 on radio 105 (comedy FM radio station) as “D.J. Dato”.

David Gogichaishvili's television career started off at The First Channel of Georgian TV. Then he continued working for the second channel, after which he went to the United States.

In 2002, he was a board member of The Online Journal of Space Communications; Assistant of the program of Caucasus School of Journalism and media Management at The International Center for Journalists; At The NBC, the practical training on adopting American late night comedy talk show television programming formats to the Georgian TV market.

=== Television ===
After going back to Georgia, David Gogichaishvili established “The Night Show Studio Production” and hosted himself “The Night Show with David Gogichaishvili” at Rustavi 2 TV network. The program aired at Rustavi 2 from 2003 till 2006.

From 2003 to 2006 David Gogichaishvili managed productions of “Kandidati” (The Georgian version of “The Apprentice” format – licensed adaptation), “Saturday Show” (Georgian prototype of “The Saturday Night Live”—sketch comedy format), and “Ana-Bana” (children's musical TV format).

In 2007, David Gogichaishvili was a project manager for the critically acclaimed situation comedy “Shua Kalakshi” airing at Imedi Television, for “Gogona Gareubnidan” (a single camera situation comedy), and the “Kacebis Shou” (Men's show - comedy talk show format).

== Other activities ==
David Gogichaishvili was a lecturer teaching Media Management at The Journalism School at the Georgian Institute of Public Affairs in 2004.

As of 2019, David Gogichaishvili is a people management trainer, running a practical training course for existing middle as well as higher level managers at Forward Academy. As of 2019, he is also an inspirational speaker on both Georgian and English languages and a business consultant.
