= Star Academy (Georgian TV series) =

Star Academy (Georgian: ვარსკვლავების აკადემია) is the edition of the international television format Star Academy in the Republic of Georgia. It aired on Rustavi 2. Its main sponsor was MagtiCom.

Star Academy is a competition where 14 young singers endeavor to reach their goal of a career as a singer. The participants participate in a weekly show. The best from the best are chosen in the Academy during 12 weeks. The project ends with a final show which reveals the winner.

The Star Academy is a format with a reality show and a concert show in which 12 participants live in a flat located at the territory of the Star Academy. They work and rehearse in the nearby studios. Every day except Sundays 35/40 minute reality episode airs prepared showing the professional and private lives of the Star Academy participants.

The concert show, duration 90 minutes, is aired live. The participants sing the song they have prepared and the jury chooses four candidates to be eliminated. One of them can be saved by the producer group, the other by the participants. The third one is saved by the audience which votes for its favorites during the week (sending SMS and calling).

== Season 1 ==
Season 1 of the Georgian Star Academy had high ratings on Georgian television.

== Season 2 ==
The second season debuted Monday, March 9, 2009. The Star Academy building collapsed on April 26, 2009, in Sandro Euli Street, Tbilisi, and several people, including crew members and journalists, were hospitalized; two others were killed. Therefore, the show was cancelled.

=== Scores ===
	Week 2	Week 3	Week 4	Week 5	Week 6	Week 7
Aleko	36.80	38.95	39.75	39.15	30.00	30.00
Elene	36.80	38.20	36.55	39.55	30.00	29.55
Goga	33.25	33.20	36.10	35.00	27.65	28.05
Irakli	31.50	33.95	33.60	34.80	26.65	24.80
Megi	35.40	35.40	33.50	36.05	27.00	30.00
Nestan	38.70	37.60	39.55	38.35	27.90	28.34
Sopho	39.55	40.00	39.70	39.55	30.00	30.00
Temo	32.65	37.20	37.65	38.50	29.70	28.35
Eka	35.30	35.90	34.05	33.80	26.05	Evicted
Makuna	33.45	31.25	29.85	33.60	Evicted	
Nutsi	36.55	35.65	32.05	Evicted		
Levan	34.55	29.70	Evicted			
Giorgi	29.35	Evicted				
Vazha	Evicted					

Best of the night
Nominated by the jury

=== Nominations table ===
	Week 2	Week 3	Week 4	Week 5	Week 6	Week 7
Nominated by the jury	Giorgi; Goga; Irakli; Temo	Goga; Irakli; Levan; Makuna	Irakli; Makuna; Megi; Nutsi	Eka; Goga; Irakli; Makuna	Eka; Goga; Irakli; Megi	Goga; Irakli; Nestan; Temo
Aleko	Goga	Goga	Irakli	Goga	Goga	Goga
Elene	Temo	Makuna	Nutsi	Irakli	Megi	Nestan
Goga	-	-	Irakli	-	-	-
Irakli	-	-	-	-	-	-
Megi	Goga	Makuna	-	Makuna	-	Irakli
Nestan	Irakli	Irakli	Nutsi	Eka	Eka	-
Sopho	Temo	Irakli	Nutsi	Eka	Irakli	Nestan
Temo	-	Irakli	Irakli	Eka	Goga	-
Eka	Irakli	Irakli	Irakli	-	-	Evicted
Makuna	Irakli	-	-	-	Evicted	
Nutsi	Giorgi	Levan	-	Evicted		
Levan	Goga	-	Evicted			
Giorgi	-	Evicted				
Vazha	Evicted					
Saved by the contestants	Goga; 3/9 votes	Irakli; 4/8 votes	Irakli; 4/7 votes	Eka; 3/6 votes	Goga; 2/5 votes	Nestan; 2/4 votes
Saved by the teachers	Irakli	Goga	Megi	Irakli	Megi	Temo
Up for eviction	Giorgi; Temo	Levan; Makuna	Makuna; Nutsi	Goga; Makuna	Eka; Irakli	Goga; Irakli
Evicted	Giorgi; 26%	Levan; 38%	Nutsi; 35%	Makuna; 40%	Eka; 30%	abandoned*

* No eviction was held, as the series was abandoned out of respect to those killed in the collapse of the Star Academy building April 26, 2009.
