= Giorgi Sanaia =

Georgian journalist (1975–2001)

- Born: 24 February 1975; Gulripshi, Georgia
- Died: 26 July 2001 (aged 26); Tbilisi, Georgia
- Children: 1

Giorgi Sanaia, sometimes spelled as Giorgi Sanaya (Georgian: გიორგი სანაია; February 24 1975 - July 26 2001) was a Georgian television journalist of the independent broadcasting company Rustavi 2 who was murdered under controversial circumstances in 2001.

== Background ==
He was a very popular television personality as the anchorman of the "Night Courier" news program, and he was known for investigating allegations of official corruption. He was killed at his flat in Tbilisi on July 26, 2001. The killing of Sanaia was referenced in the documentary Power Trip, which details the Georgian transition to privatized electricity.

== Death ==
The murder of Giorgi Sanaia was widely believed to be politically motivated and triggered an unprecedented outpouring of public grief and anger. The government demonstrated to the Georgian public that everything was being done to find his killer, and subsequently arrested a certain Giorgi Khurtsilava who was eventually sentenced to 13 years in prison. However, Sanaia's widow and many Georgians are dissatisfied, as the court neither established a true motive for the murder, nor found answers to a number of key questions.

Giorgi Sanaia was survived by a wife and a son.
