= Cherry Street 12 =

- Genre: Sitcom, comedy
- Directed by: Avto Margvelashvili; Davit Lomsadze
- Starring: Goga Barbakadze; Maia Doborjginidze; Tatuli Edisherashvili; Tamuna Nikoladze
- Theme music composer: Tamuna Lekveishvili; Dato Ugrekhelidze
- Country of origin: Georgia
- Original language: Georgian
- No. of seasons: 1
- No. of episodes: 14

Production
- Executive producer: Aleko Malkhazishvili
- Producer: Oto Lomtadze

Original release
- Network: Rustavi 2

Cherry Street 12 is a Georgian sitcom-comedy television series that aired on Rustavi 2 which the "Comedy Group" filmed in 2012. The series aired on PIKTV too - Russian Sound in 2012.

== Plot ==
Nika and Mari are a young couple who live in Nika's sister's home with her father. Nika launches a new job in the distribution. Her wife admits she is not happy. Mari works in the brand store called "Style of Tata". Nika's sister has a small business. Ucha is Nika's employee and the detergent distributor. Shalva is the father of Mari and plays the violin very well.

== Production ==
The Comedy Group created the decorations for TV Series, the shooting took place in four different locations in the pavilion, Nika and Mari's home, bedroom, office, and the bar.

== Cast ==
- Goga Barbakadze - Nika
- Maia Doborjginidze - Tata
- Tatuli Edisherashvili - Nino
- Tamuna Nikoladze - Mari
- Kakha Jokhadze - Ucha
- Slava Nateladze - Shalva
- Giorgi Jikia - Goga
- Vano Kurasbediani - Levan
- Tiko Katamashvili - Liliko
- Nino Arsenishvili - Lana
- Tamta Imnashvili - Masho
- Ani Amilakhvari - Lizi
