= Ajara TV =

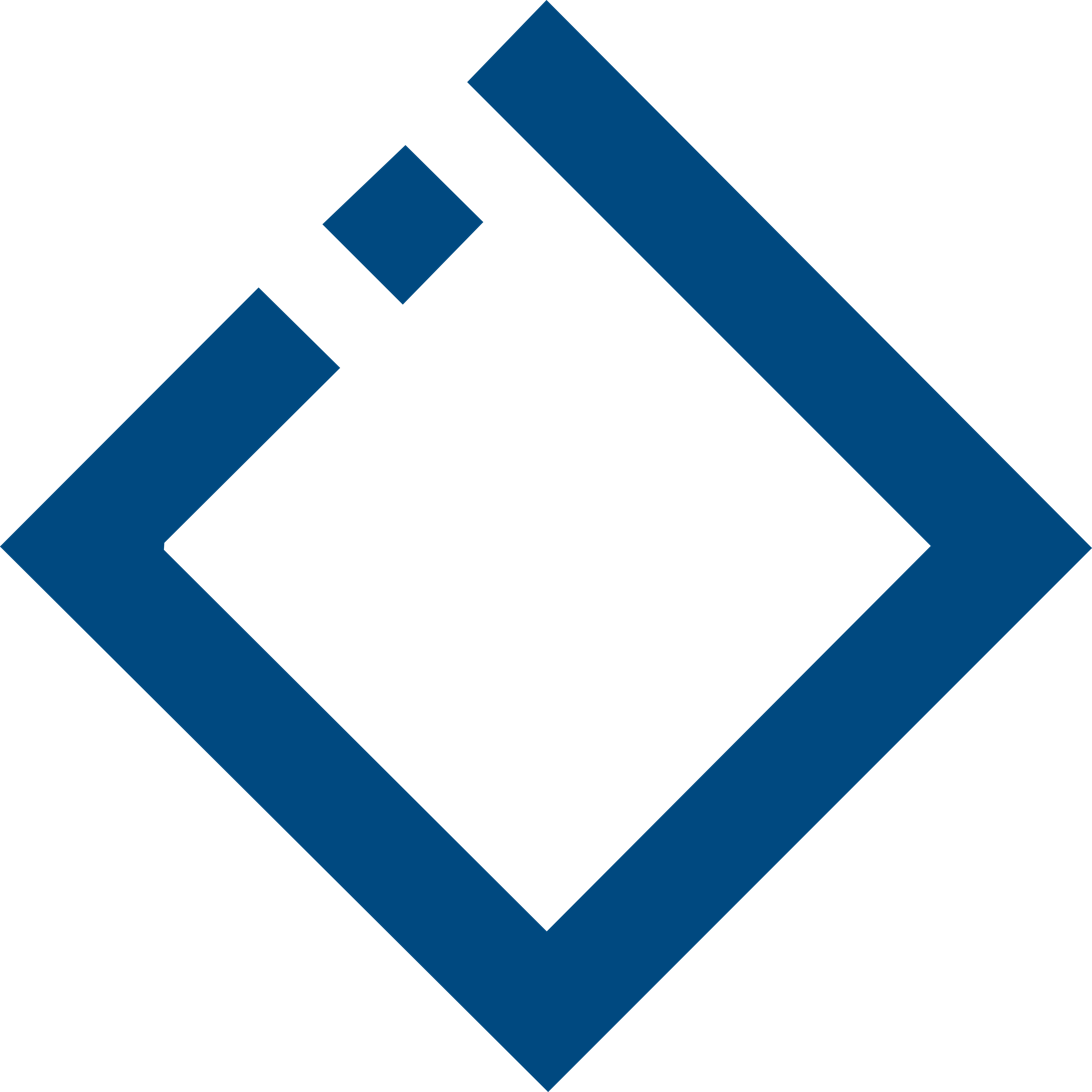
- Country: Georgia
- Broadcast area: Europe, Central Asia, North Africa, Middle East
- Headquarters: Adjara, Georgia

Programming
- Languages: Georgian, Adjaran

Ownership
- Owner: Independent
- Key people: Giorgi Kokhreidze

History
- Launched: November 4, 1987

Links
- Website: adjaratv.ge

Ajara TV (also known as Adjara TV) (Georgian: აჭარის ტელევიზია) is a Georgian television channel in the region of Adjara. The station has three offices in Adjara, one in Tbilisi and one in Kutaisi.

== History ==
The company was founded on November 4, 1987 with its first program being Batumi speaks and shows.

In 1999, it became the second television channel in Georgia (after the First Channel) to start satellite broadcasts using Globecast as its partner.

After the passing of a new law on December 25, 2013, Ajara TV obtained the status of public broadcaster. The decision was denounced by the OSCE RFoM.
