= Television in Georgia (country) =

Television in Georgia was introduced in 1954, when Georgia was still known as the Georgian SSR. The most watched TV channel is Imedi TV which is known for its pro-government orientation, followed by the pro-opposition TV channel, TV Pirveli.

== List of channels ==
This is a list of television channels that broadcast from Georgia in Georgian.

=== Public ===
Name	Owner	Established	Website
First Channel (1TV) (Georgian: პირველი არხი)	Georgian Public Broadcaster	1954	1tv.ge
First Channel Sport (Georgian: პირველი არხი სპორტი)	Georgian Public Broadcaster	2024	1tv.ge/pirveli-arkhi-sporti/
Adjara TV (Georgian: აჭარის ტელევიზია)	Public Broadcaster Adjara Television and Radio	1987	ajaratv.ge

=== Private ===
Name	Owner	Established	Website
Rustavi 2 (Georgian: რუსთავი 2)	Rustavi 2 Broadcasting Company	1994	rustavi2.ge
Maestro TV (Georgian: მაესტრო)	Imedi Media Holding	1995	maestro.ge
Imedi TV (Georgian: იმედი)	Imedi Media Holding	2003	imedi.ge
Obiektivi (Georgian: ობიექტივი)	NNLE Non commercial Media-Union Obiektivi	2010	obieqtivi.net
PalitraNews (Georgian: პალიტრანიუსი)	LTD Palitranews	2015	palitranews.ge
TV Pirveli (Georgian: TV პირველი)	LTD TV Pirveli	2015	tvpirveli.ge
Alt-Info (Georgian: ალტ-ინფო)	LTD Alt-Info	2019	altinfo.net
Euronews Georgia (Georgian: ევრონიუს ჯორჯია)	LTD Silk Media	2019	euronewsgeorgia.com
Formula TV (Georgian: ფორმულა)	LTD Formula	2019	formula.ge

== Discontinued ==
Name	Owner	Established	Closed
First Channel — Teleschool (Georgian: პირველი არხი - განათლება)	Georgian Public Broadcaster	1991	2023
Mtavari Arkhi (Georgian: მთავარი არხი)	Mtavari Arkhi Broadcasting Company	2019	2025

== Most viewed channels [TVMR.GE 18.05.26 - 24.05.26] ==
Position	Channel	Share of total viewing (%)
1	Imedi TV	24.00
2	TV Pirveli	13.19
3	Formula TV	11.44
4	Rustavi 2	11.05
5	GDS	6.74
6	1TV	4.85
7	Comedy Channel	3.26
8	Ajara TV	2.99

== See also ==
- List of Georgian television series
- Television in the Soviet Union
