= William D. Hamilton =

William D. Hamilton may refer to:

- W. D. Hamilton (1936–2000), British evolutionary biologist
- William D. Hamilton (Illinois politician), 19th century Illinois state representative
