= Kibar Khalvashi =

Georgian businessman (born 1963)

Kibar Khalvashi (Georgian: ქიბარ ხალვაში; born 20 May 1963) is a Georgian businessman living abroad in Germany. He is the current "Rustavi 2" majority shareholder. Khalvashi has been placed in the list of Georgian millionaires. His company, ARTI Group, was established in 1996 and is a leading distributor of many foreign products in Georgia, Azerbaijan and Armenia such as Pepsi, and in particular is an exclusive distributor of Procter & Gamble products. The company as of 2019 had an annual turnover surpassing 130 million USD and 850 employees.

== Background ==
Khalvashi was previously the full owner of the broadcasting company Rustavi 2 when he purchased it for $7 million in 2004. In December 2006, he was forced under strong pressure of the Saakashvili-led government to concede Rustavi 2 to a new owner. In July 2019, Khalvashi regained ownership of the channel after the European Court of Human Rights (ECHR) published a verdict on the lawsuit in favour of Khalvashi. However, a month later, it became known to him that the company had accumulated a debt of 70 million GEL to creditors, most of which, he claims, was during the ongoing ownership dispute. Khalvashi made a statement, which said that Rustavi 2 was in a "catastrophic" financial situation and announced that he would be selling the company. Khalvashi blamed former director Nika Gvaramia for the financial crisis faced by the company. He noted that this debt was accumulated "deliberately" by those formerly in charge, who had previously taken the company from him and that the company was at the "verge of bankruptcy". Later, Khalvashi said he faced two choices, either to file for bankruptcy or try to save the company. He decided not to sell the channel and instead use all his resources to support and bring it out of debt, expressing hope that the channel would become successful again.

After Irakli Okruashvili, former defense minister and at the time close friend of Khalvashi, accused Mikheil Saakashvili of various crimes and formed an opposition party, Khalvashi was seen as a possible funder and supporter. Khalvashi faced threats and pressures directed at his businesses and family. Officials such as Davit Kezerashvili told him that he had to choose a side, despite Khalvashi being adamant that he was apolitical and did not want any involvement in their disputes. On November 16, 2006, Khalvashi met then-president Saakashvili, who gave him an ultimatum - to surrender all his properties in order for him and his family to have a safe life - which Khalvashi refused. The next day, he was coerced into signing over shares of Rustavi 2. Soon after, on September 24, 2007, approximately 100 armed forces intruded his company, ARTI Group. They threatened his employees into signing documents for evading duties, which were nonexistent, and fined them baselessly. They were told that this was the punishment for those who were close to Okruashvili. He also had to pay $6 million for bailing out people close to him, whom the government was arresting for groundless reasons. Following these ambushes, he decided to settle and give up one of his companies, International Building Company (IBC). One night at 3 AM, without any prior notice, all assets were confiscated from the company and shares taken from Khalvashi and his Turkish partners. In addition, the state refused to compensate the work that the company had done, which amounted to 13 million GEL. The company was released from ongoing construction projects. The capital, fixed assets, materials and equipment were taken as well, worth almost 20 million GEL per project, and were never returned, though they are still in Khalvashi's name.

Despite the previous agreement, various government officials continued threatening Khalvashi and offered him solutions such as paying them $17 million. The companies of Khalvashi were collectively fined more than 60 million GEL, which would mean bankruptcy for most. Nevertheless, Khalvashi did not give in and was unwilling to concede his other properties. Khalvashi was in Germany, when he was told that if he returned to Georgia and supported the president during elections, he could be "reborn". His lawyer and CEOs informed him that Bacho Akhalaia had been telling them to bring him back. They told Akhalaia that they had already settled this, with Khalvashi giving up his company, and that he refused to support the president or be involved in such schemes. He was then told that he would "regret it". Two days later, late at night on December 23, a fire destroyed the factory of the distributing company, ARTI Group, causing millions of dollars in damage. The first firetrucks that arrived did not have water access and went to refill tanks. They came back after 40 minutes and by that time, the warehouse was completely burnt down. Later, an investigation found that water was available and fuel containers and gloves were found near the center of the fire. The insurance company was under the orders of authorities to not compensate the loss. Following this, assets were frozen in Khalvashi's other companies and eventually, were illegally seized.

During the 2008 elections, Khalvashi's village did not support the government and was protesting. In May 2004, Khalvashi had offered to renovate the school in his home village near Batumi using his own funds, as the school was in a deplorable condition, having collapsed as a result of a flood. The school reopened soon after. Saakashvili attempted to win the favor of the village by repainting the renovated school and accrediting the full restoration to himself.

Kibar Khalvashi also owned 60 percent of a chain of supermarkets. The authorities confiscated the company's property. At that time, large amount of food products were in storage. During the August Russo-Georgian war, the "Livo" administration appealed to give the seized products, which were due to expire in a month, to the refugees. However, the authorities feared that this would earn Khalvashi, who was already supported by many citizens, more sympathy. Thus, they closed the facilities with padlocks, took the keys and even today, the food spoils there.

== Personal life ==
Khalvashi has three children with wife Nona Khalvashi.
