= H5 (US company) =

H5 is a privately held company specializing in information retrieval systems for the legal industry, with offices in San Francisco and New York City. Founded in 1999, H5 combines advanced proprietary information retrieval technologies with professional expertise in linguistics, statistics, computer science, law, information technology, process engineering and e-discovery. The company completed its third and latest round of venture capital funding in 2005; its primary investors are the private equity firms of Draper Fisher Jurvetson, Institutional Venture Partners (IVP), and Walden VC.

H5 has attracted positive attention for its promotion of common standards in the field of information retrieval, including its participation in the U.S. Government’s TREC Legal Track initiative, a research program of the National Institute of Standards and Technology (NIST) that measures the accuracy of document review and search methods for e-discovery. H5 was profiled in an October 2007 Forbes article noting the company’s prominent Advisory Board members and its 2007 Thought Leadership Summit that the company co-hosted with Georgetown Law. At that summit, United States Supreme Court Justice Stephen Breyer joined a panel discussion alongside H5 CEO Nicolas Economou and moderator Arthur R. Miller of Harvard Law School.

== Processes ==
H5’s proprietary automated document review process is a hybrid approach that relies on both human subject matter expertise and advanced information retrieval technologies. The company utilizes academically validated quality assurance methods, based on the government’s TREC Legal Track protocols, to measure the accuracy of its results.

H5’s process and results have been evaluated by a variety of independent industry and government studies, including the National Institute of Standards and Technology’s 2008 TREC Legal Track study, as well as a 2005 independent academic study which compared H5’s process against a team of attorneys using traditional manual document review methodologies on a 48,000 document collection. (The manual review process found 51% of all relevant documents vs. H5’s retrieval rate of 95%.)

== H5's name ==
H5’s name derives from what it considers to be the historical analogy between 18th century inventor John Harrison’s fourth marine chronometer (known as “H4”), which provided an accurate measurement of navigational longitude (thereby unlocking the world’s ocean for accurate navigation) and its own modern process by which to precisely navigate through vast amounts of electronic data.

== Client engagements ==
Although H5 does not disclose its clients on its website, the company has been publicly reported to work on cases involving RealNetworks, Microsoft, and Tyco, as well as with prominent law firms such as O’Melveny & Myers, Boies Schiller & Flexner, and Bartlit Beck Herman Palenchar & Scott.

== Management team ==
- Nicolas Economou, chairman and chief executive officer
- Jeff Kangas, executive managing director
- Eoin Beirne, executive managing director
- Julia Brickell, Esq., executive managing director and general counsel
- Robert S. Bauer, Ph.D., chief technology officer
- Michael B. Rubenstein, managing director of global practice
- Bruce Hedin, Ph.D., principal scientist

== Advisory board ==
- Professor Arthur R. Miller, former Bruce Bromley Professor of Law at Harvard Law School
- Michael J. Halloran, Esq., former counselor to the chairman and deputy chief of staff at the United States Securities and Exchange Commission
- Neal L. Wolkoff, Esq., chief executive officer of ELX Electronic Liquidity Exchange, former chairman and CEO of the American Stock Exchange
- Raymond L. Ocampo Jr., Esq., retired general counsel of Oracle Corporation
- Charles Blixt, retired general counsel of R.J. Reynolds
- Paul J. Polking, Esq., retired executive vice president, general counsel, and member of the Management Operating Committee for Bank of America Corporation and its predecessor companies.
- S. Allen Lackey, Esq., retired general counsel of Shell Oil Company
- Stanley Stroup, Esq., former general counsel and executive vice president of Wells Fargo & Company
- Edward A. Kangas, former global chairman and CEO of Deloitte, chairman of the board of Tenet Healthcare Corporation, and board member of EDS
- John C. Dean, former chairman and CEO of Silicon Valley Bancshares and Silicon Valley Bank
- Professor Michael A. Cusumano, Sloan Management Review Distinguished Professor at the MIT Sloan School of Management, author
- Edward B. Roberts, Ph.D., David Sarnoff Professor of Management of Technology at the Massachusetts Institute of Technology, the chair of the MIT Sloan School’s Management of Technological Innovation & Entrepreneurship research and education programs, as well as the founder and chair of the MIT Entrepreneurship Center.

=== Scientific advisory board ===
- John Seely Brown, Ph.D., former chief scientist of Xerox Corporation and former director of Xerox PARC
- Mitchell P. Marcus, Ph.D., RCA Professor of Artificial Intelligence and former chair of the Department of Computer & Information Science at University of Pennsylvania
- H. Paul Zeiger, Ph.D., former chairman of the Department of Computer Science at the University of Colorado, Boulder
