= Paradox (2014 TV series) =

- Genre: Drama; Horror; Thriller
- Created by: Jaba Melkadze
- Directed by: Levan Bakhia
- Starring: Rati Tsiteladze; Ia Sukhitashvili; Aleks Komarovskii; Nanka Kalatozishvili; Giorgi Maskharashvili; Anastasia Sheremet
- Countries of origin: Ukraine; Georgia
- Original languages: Russian; Georgian
- No. of seasons: 2
- No. of episodes: 17

Production
- Producer: Bera Ivanishvili
- Running time: Approx. 43–64 minutes(per episode)

Original release
- Network: GDS
- Release: 2 February 2014 – 19 January 2016

Paradox (Georgian: პარადოქსი; Ukrainian: парадокс) is the first joint Georgian-Ukrainian TV series. The premiere took place in Georgia on TV channel GDS February 2, 2014.

== Plot ==
Young, successful scientist, Irakli (Rati Tsiteladze) who is researching the afterlife, is suddenly struck by family tragedy. After attempting suicide and five month of coma, he wakes up in a post-apocalyptic world full of vampires. He then searches for his wife.

== Cast ==
- Ia Sukhitashvili as Tina
- Tornike Gogrichiani as Guga
- Anastasia Sheremet as Rita
- Giorgi Maskharashvili as Giorgi
- Aleks Komarovskii as Petro
- Nanka Kalatozishvili as Elene
- Zaza Kolelishvili as Niko
- Dato Darchia as Qartlosi
