= The Social Life of Information =

Book by John Seely Brown and Paul Duguid

- Author: John Seely Brown; Paul Duguid
- Cover artist: Janusz Kapusta
- Publisher: Harvard Business Review Press
- Publication date: 2000
- Publication place: Boston, Massachusetts
- Pages: x, 320
- ISBN: 978-0-87584-762-7
- OCLC: 42475952

The Social Life of Information is a 2000 book by John Seely Brown (the former Chief Scientist of Xerox Corporation and director of Xerox PARC) and Paul Duguid (Adjunct professor at the UC Berkeley School of Information), which discusses recently developed practices in the transmission of information in social and business contexts.

The authors argue that information technology needs to be considered in a broad context that includes the entirety of society and social resources, in contrast to the narrow focus on information that tends to be the framework of such technology – what the authors criticize as "tunnel design". That is, increased technological delivery of information does not in and of itself contribute to a better future. The text, in part, analyzes examples of the office world's adoption of technology, offering a differentiated rather than an unquestioningly affirmative view of the effects.

== User agents ==
Serving as an early example of the ambiguous utility of software to human, the authors discuss software known as autonomous agents which manipulate information. Different forms of such agents include information broker, product brokering, merchant brokering, and negotiation. The authors use an example of information brokering using the Macintosh program named Sherlock that searched for the word "knobot" via the Internet. Product brokering would be an example of an online bookstore sending a person an email about a book for sale based on the previous types of books the customer bought. Merchant brokering, now widely practiced, consists of finding the best price for a product. For example, eBay allows users, not necessarily in the same location, to buy new, used, or refurbished products through an auction, at a fixed price, or through negotiation.

This book has been republished in 2002 with a new introduction, by the Harvard Business School Press.

== Reviews ==
Reviews of the book from professional journals include:

- Gleason, Sandra (Summer 2001). Planning for Higher Education. 29(4): pp. 38-39.
- Muir, Clive (2001), in Journal of Business Communication. 38(1): pp. 92-95.
- O'Malley, Lisa (2002), in Journal of Marketing. 66(4): pp. 124-127. JSTOR 3203363.
- Watson-Boone, Peter (2001), in Portal: Libraries and the Academy. 1(2): pp. 180-12. doi:10.1353/pla.2001.0031.
- The Library Quarterly. 2001. 71(1): pp. 94-95. doi:10.1086/603252

The authors have collected additional reviews on their website.

== See also ==
- Knowledge management
- John Seely Brown
- Information ecology
- Information society

== Editions ==
- — (March 2000). The social life of information. Boston: Harvard Business School Press. ISBN 978-0-87584-762-7. OCLC 42475952. OL 13626916M. x, 320 pages. Hardcover.
- — (April 2002). The social life of information. Boston: Harvard Business School Press. ISBN 978-1-57851-708-4. OL 3584104M. xxvi, 330 pages. With a new preface Looking Around. Paperback.
- — (14 March 2017). The social life of information (Updated ed.). Boston: Harvard Business Review Press. ISBN 978-1-63369-241-1. OL 26955465M. xlvi, 284 pages. With an additional preface Reassessing the Social, and an introduction by David Weinberger. Hardcover.
