= Christian Verdun =

American artist

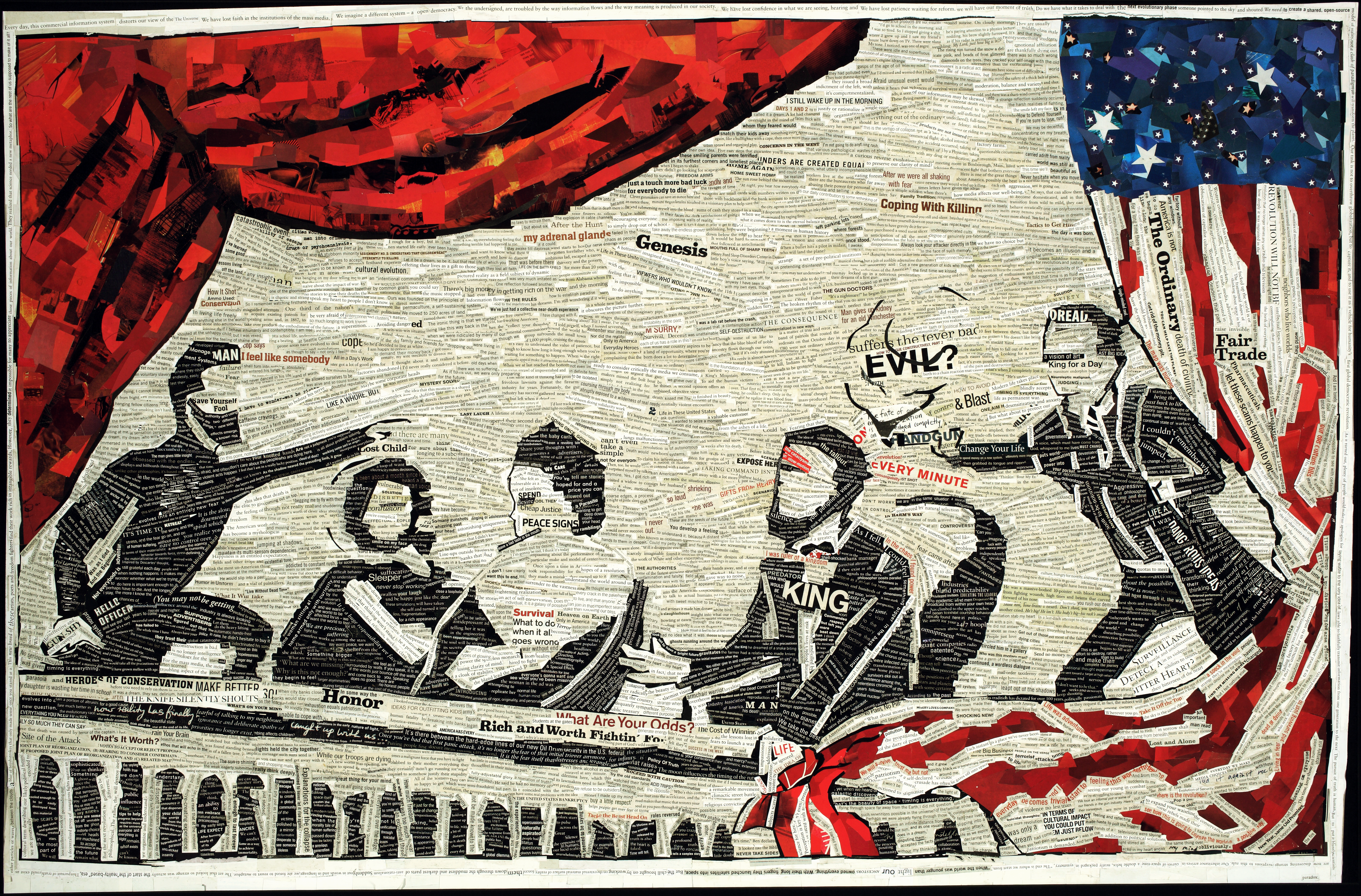
Paradox, an assemblage poem arranged to make a picture of the Ford's Theater box where Abraham Lincoln was assassinated

Christian Verdun is an American artist best known for his work on the cut-up William S. Burroughs-style poetry collage Paradox. In 2010, he released another poetry assemblage utilizing the style of the previous work, titled Escape, and another work in 2013, Anonymous.

== Paradox ==
Paradox is a cut-up poetry collage forming a picture of Abraham Lincoln being assassinated at Ford's Theater. The 40-by-27-inch piece took roughly three years to complete. It is composed entirely of magazines which were obtained for free or by dumpster diving from book stores. The name is derived from the literary device, the paradox, described by Nicholas Rescher as a “juxtaposition of incongruous ideas for the sake of striking exposition or unexpected insight. It functions as a method of literary composition — and analysis — which involves examining apparently contradictory statements and drawing conclusions either to reconcile them or to explain their presence.”

== Escape ==
Escape, an assemblage poem arranged to make a picture of the last helicopter out of Saigon and the crowd on the stairwell passing a baby up the stairway

In 2010, Verdun finished his second piece, Escape, which was done using the same collage style as his previous work, to show an image of the last helicopter leaving Saigon at the end of the Vietnam War. He continued his method of recreating pictures of major historical significance, however, this time he mixed French and English text, presumably because of the French colonization of Vietnam. This image is much smaller than Paradox, measuring 12 inches by 12 inches.

== Anonymous ==
In 2013, he finished his third piece, the 11-inch by 8-inch Anonymous, created from words cut from the comic book V for Vendetta which were remixed to form a picture of the comic's namesake character, V, wearing a Guy Fawkes mask.
