= In the Middle of the City =

Georgian sitcom

- Official Poster
- Georgian: შუა ქალაქში
- Created by: Night Show Studio
- Starring: Otar Tatishvili; Maia Doborjginidze; Goga Barbakadze; Tatuli Edisherashvili; Tamuna Nikoladze; Bacho Kajaia
- Country of origin: Georgia
- No. of seasons: 16
- No. of episodes: 389(+137, 10 years Later)

Production
- Running time: approx. 40-45 minutes (per episode)

Original release
- Network: Imedi TV
- Release: September 23, 2007 – present

In the Middle of the City
- Genre: Sitcom
- Created by: Night Show Studio
- Starring: Otar Tatishvili; Maia Doborjginidze; Goga Barbakadze; Tatuli Edisherashvili; Tamuna Nikoladze; Bacho Kajaia
- Country of origin: Georgia
- Original language: Georgian
- No. of seasons: 7
- No. of episodes: 137

Production
- Running time: approx. 40-45 minutes (per episode)

Original release
- Network: Imedi TV
- Release: 2014 – present

In the Middle of the City (Georgian: შუა ქალაქში) is a Georgian sitcom about a group of friends as they live in Tbilisi's neighborhood of Vake. The show is produced by The Night Show Studio. It was originally broadcast from 2007 to 2010. The show premiered on September 23, 2007, and completed its first season on July 13, 2008. The second season has been confirmed by Imedi TV. It is filmed in Tbilisi, Georgia. The plot follows the life of one peculiar family, with friends, in Tbilisi, each of which has a risible, odd lifestyle with many surprises. As for the frivolous family, with singular friends and neighbouring gossip girls, they lead a normal life. It also has a continuation of 10 Years Later.

== DVDs ==
1. Season 1 - Gasachiri Tbilisshi (Troubles in Tbilisi) (with volumes)
2. Season 2 - Gagrdzeleba (Sequelance) (with volumes)
3. Season 3 - Sauketeso Droebi (Best Times) (with volumes)
4. Season 2 - Rats Etershi Ver Mokhvda (What to TV not seen) (all volumes together)
5. Season 4 - Komediebi Uakhles Sezonshi (Comedy in the Newest Season) (with volumes)
6. Season 3 - Gadagheba Shua Kalakis (In the Middle of City Snaping) (together volumes)
7. The Complete Season 1 (fanmade DVD) (together volumes)
8. Season 5 - Sicilis Adgili (The Place of the Fun) (DVD release become faster than aired on TV) (with volumes)
9. Season 6 - (TRED - Fanmade DVD) (all volumes together)
10. In the Middle of City 10 Episodes (Fanmade) (no volumes)
11. Season 6 - Sakhlshi Ar Mogtskindeba (House every time good) (Original Version) (with volumes)
12. Season 7 - Mtliani Komedia (Full Comedy) (with volumes)
13. Season 8 (unreleased)

== Cast ==
Main Cast In Order of Appearance

- Otar Tatishvili .... Irakli Chkheidze - Marika's husband
- Maia Doborjginidze .... Marika Chkheidze - Irakli's wife
- Goga Barbakadze .... Dato Aleksidze - Marika's cousin
- Tatuli Edisherashvili .... Tamar Glonti - sister of Ketevan, Chkheidze's neighbour
- Tamuna Nikoladze .... Ketevan Glonti - sister of Tamar, Chkheidze's neighbour
- Bacho Kajaia .... Lasha Toronjadze - husband of Ketevan, Chkheidze's neighbour
- Keta Lortkipanidze .... Eka - friend of Chkheidze's
- Jaba Kiladze .... Sandro Makharadze - Chkheidze's families friend
- Salome Chulukhadze .... Salome - Waitress, Sandro's lover
- Mariam Jologua .... Anano - Dato's Ex-girlfriend
- Lela Meburishvili .... Tika - Chkheidze's neighbour

Episodes Cast

- Nika Katsaridze ... Amiran - "Chkheidze's handicraftsman"
- Gia Mujiri ... Sasha - "Chkheidze's neighbour"
- Sandro Margalitashvili ... Jibo - Dato's friend
- Nino Khomasuridze .... Waitress #1 - In the cafe
- Eka Lobzhanidze .... Waitress #2
- Rezo Bagashvili .... Father #1
- Merab Devidze .... Father #2
- Tamar Skhirtladze .... Grandmother
- Ketevan Gugeshidze .... Irakli's mother
- Nino Koberidze .... Tsisana - Mother in Law
- Maia Tatishvili .... Natela
- Levan Zagashvili
- Nino Zodelava
- Tato Chokhonelidze
- Tiko Sokhadze .... Nini - Dato's friend
- Temur Kiladze .... Solomon
- Goga Chkheidze .... Narrator
- Dato Machavariani .... Gocha
- Sofia Mayer.... Gvantsa Glonti
- Gigi Gogoladze .... Dmitri
- Nika Garsenishvili .... Player
- Vasili Kartvelishvili .... Photographer
- Mariam Kakabadze .... Journalist
- Vano Chelidze
- Zura Manjgaladze
- Irakli Shengelia
- Kakha Mikiashvili .... Rezo
- Nino Gudavadze .... Guide
- Nini Tsiklauri
- Tornike Prangishvili
- Juka Tsiklauri .... Witch
- Bakar Gelashvili .... Japaridze
- Zura Manjgaladze .... Doctor
- Eka Kikvadze .... Nurse Natia
- Tsisia Metreveli .... Irinka
- Eka Jamagidze .... Vika
- Ani Beshitaishvili
- Ani Chumburidze ....
- Ani Topuridze ....

== Crew ==
Project Manager

- David Gogichaishvili

Executive Producer

- Irakli Kakabadze

Project Director

- Vano Chelidze

Set Director

- Gocha Korkhelauri

Screenplay

- Giorgi Janelidze
- Irakli Vakhtangishvili

Computer Grapichs and Editing

- Vakho Kakauridze
- Merab Devidze
- Giorgi Zenaishvili

Set Operators

- Irakli Gokadze
- Levan Dabrundashvili

Operators

- Merab Kiknadze
- Giorgi Bendiashvili
- Beka Shakashvili

Painter

- Eka Amashukeli

Segment-Producers

- Mariam Mdinaradze
- Nini Kintsurashvili

Coordinador

- Eka Kikvadze

Studio Design

- Vano Chelidze
- Eka Amashukeli

Decorators

- Gela Gelashvili
- Tengo Amiridze

Sound Operator

- Giorgi Saralidze

Lighting

- Irakli Gokadze
- Valiko Machabeli
- Davit Kupatadze

Intro Music

- Giga Mikaberidze

Intro Graphics

- Eka Bichiashvili

Studio Engineers

- Yuri Agekian
- Avto Kajaia
- Gia Merabishvili
- Ramaz Danelia

Visage

- Irina Iamanidze

Operators Assistant

- Giorgi Chigladze

Format Consultants

- Mitch Semuel
- Bill Persky
- John Marcus
- Norm Gunzenhauer
- Bruce Ferber
- Craig Cnaizeg

== Episode Dates ==
Season 1 September:

- 09.23.2007----------Episode 01
- 09.29.2007----------Episode 02
- 09.30.2007----------Episode 03

October:

- 10.06.2007----------Episode 04
- 10.07.2007----------Episode 05
- 10.13.2007----------Episode 06
- 10.14.2007----------Episode 07
- 10.20.2007----------Episode 08
- 10.21.2007----------Episode 09
- 10.27.2007----------Episode 10
- 10.28.2007----------Episode 11

November:

- 11.03.2007----------Episode 12
- 11.04.2007----------Episode 13

December:

- 12.15.2007----------Episode 14
- 12.16.2007----------Episode 15
- 12.22.2007----------Episode 16
- 12.23.2007----------Episode 17

May:

- 05.24.2008----------Episode 18
- 05.25.2008----------Episode 19
- 05.31.2008----------Episode 20

June:

- 06.01.2008----------Episode 21
- 06.07.2008----------Episode 22
- 06.08.2008----------Episode 23
- 06.14.2008----------Episode 24
- 06.15.2008----------Episode 25
- 06.21.2008----------Episode 26
- 06.22.2008----------Episode 27
- 06.28.2008----------Episode 28
- 06.29.2008----------Episode 29

July:

- 07.05.2008----------Episode 30
- 07.06.2008----------Episode 31
- 07.12.2008----------Episode 32
- 07.13.2008----------Episode 33

Season 2 October:

- 10.11.2008----------Episode 01
- 10.12.2008----------Episode 02
- 10.18.2008----------Episode 03
- 10.19.2008----------Episode 04
- 10.25.2008----------Episode 05
- 10.26.2008----------Episode 06

November:

- 11.01.2008----------Episode 07
- 11.02.2008----------Episode 08
- 11.08.2008----------Episode 09
- 11.09.2008----------Episode 10
- 11.15.2008----------Episode 11
- 11.16.2008----------Episode 12
- 11.22.2008----------Episode 13
- 11.23.2008----------Episode 13
- 11.29.2008----------Episode 14
- 11.30.2008----------Episode 15

December:

- 12.06.2008----------Episode 16
- 12.07.2008----------Episode 17
- 12.13.2008----------Episode 18
- 12.14.2008----------Episode 19
- 12.20.2008----------Episode 20
- 12.21.2008----------Episode 21
- 12.27.2008----------Episode 22
- 12.28.2008----------Episode 23
- 12.31.2008----------Episode 24

January:

- 01.01.2009----------Episode 25

== 10 Years Later ==
10 Years Later (Georgian: 10 წლის შემდეგ) is a Georgian television program. The show is a continuation of In the Middle of the City, where the line is drawn between the groups of friends as they live in Tbilisi's district of Vake.

=== Cast ===
- Otar Tatishvili - Irakli Chkheidze
- Maia Doborjginidze - Marika Chkheidze
- Goga Barbakadze - Dato Aleksidze
- Tatuli Edisherashvili - Tamar Glonti
- Tamuna Nikoladze - Ketevan Glonti
- Bacho Kajaia - Lasha Toronjadze
- Mariam Jologua - Anano
