= Bakhva Bregvadze =

Georgian TV host

- Born: Bakhva Bregvadze; 17 June 1985 (age 40); Tbilisi, Georgia
- Occupation(s): Georgian tv host, Director, Actor, publisher and marketer

Bakhva Bregvadze (Georgian: ბახვა ბრეგვაძე, born 17 June 1985) is a Georgian TV host, actor, publisher, marketer and radio presenter.

== Early life ==
Bakhva Bregvadze was born on 17 June 1985. Born and raised in Tbilisi. Georgian TV host, Director, Actor and Publisher. His one of the most famous roles is "Bakhva's" personage in the popular TV series "My wife's Friends" created by "Formula Creative". He was rather famous with TV mega shows "Georgian Pop Idol" and "X Factor Georgia". Bakhva is also presenter of different events and concerts; he presented the New Year gala concert in 2018.

In 2012–2013 he studied at the National Cinematography school of France, in 2007–2010 at the Caucasian University School of Law and graduated as the magister of International Law, afterwards he continued his study at the Institute of Human Rights in Strasbourg. He studied business and marketing at the Caucasian Business School and Georgian Technical University and he also gained skills at Start up and Scale up in the University of Applied Sciences in Amsterdam.

== Career ==
He has two main professions of a TV host and a marketer and is successfully combining them. He has been a head of the Marketing and Public Relations Department at JSC Sarajishvili since 2007. The Sarajishvili company is the prominent and historical wine brandy with unique tastes; increasing the company's awareness locally and internationally is one of the main parts of Bakhva's activity. From 2018 Bakhva has been the TV host of "Day Imedi" show at Imedi Broadcasting Company.

== Publisher ==
Bakhva founded publishing-house "Redaction #3" with his partners in 2014. The publishing-house puts together magazines: CulinART, Twelve, Georgia To See and Forbes (Woman). Bakhva is publisher and creative director of the above-mentioned magazines.

== Filmography ==
Bakhva Bregvadze actively got interested in actors career from 2014 and performed "Bakhva's" role in popular TV series "My Wife's Friends" by "Formula Creative" (season 5, season 6, season 7, season 8, season 9) directed by Giorgi Liponava. He was 22 years old when director Archil Kavtaradze shot him in the film "Subordination". Director Nika Mari shot him in "Awful Vacations" in 2015 and Dito Tsintsadze shot him in "Breath and Out-breath" in 2018. He also played in Kote Kalandadze's film "Drummer" to be premiered in 2019.
