= John Hagel III =

American management consultant and author

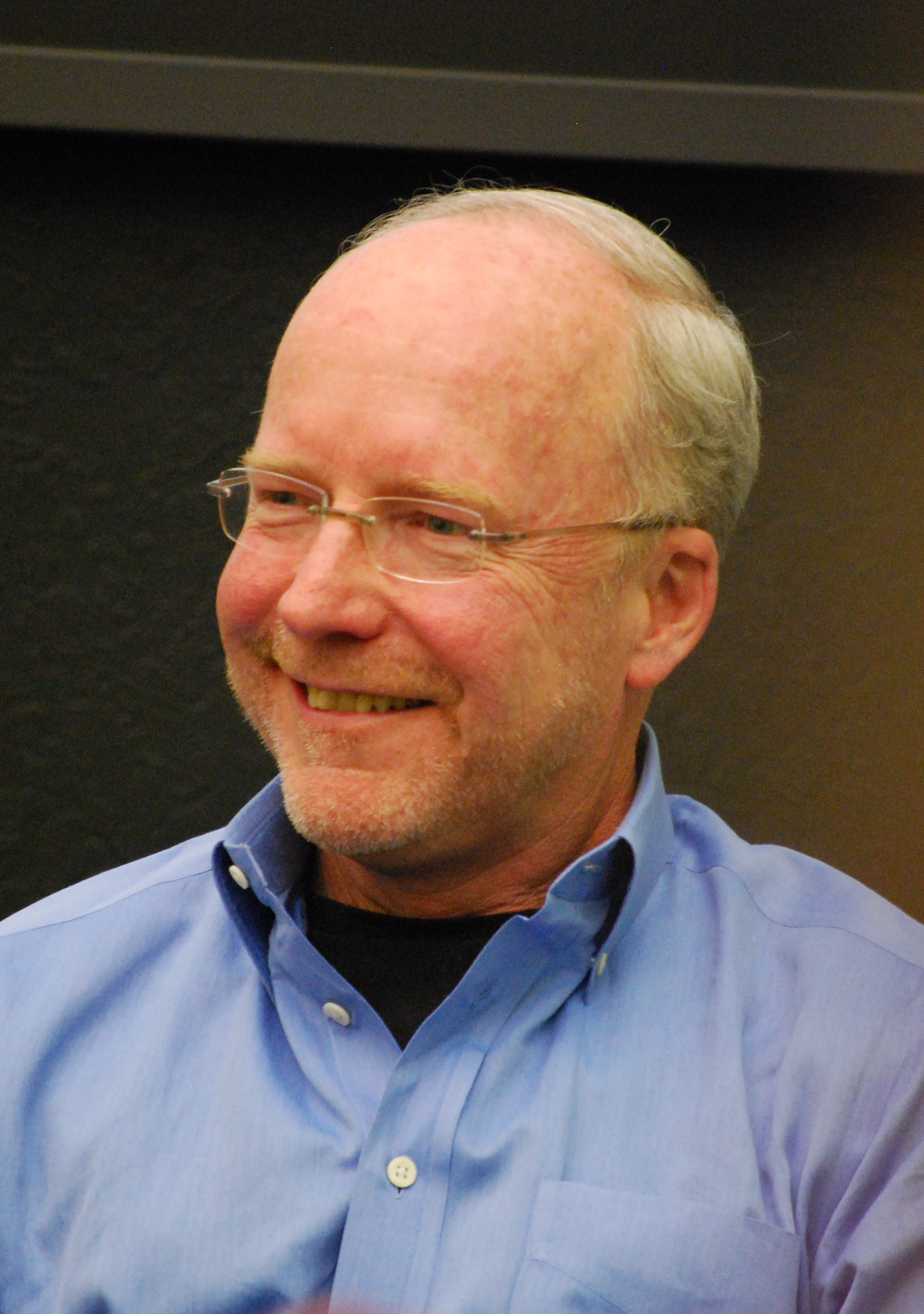
- Hagel in 2009
- Occupations: Management consultant, author
- Title: Founder and co-chairman of Deloitte Center for the Edge (2007–2020); Founder of Beyond Our Edge LLC (2020); Board of Trustees member for Santa Fe Institute; Board of Trustees member for Independent Institute
- Website: johnhagel.com

John Hagel III is an American management consultant and author. and entrepreneur who has spent more than four decades working at the intersection of business strategy, information technology, and organizational change. He is best known for co-authoring the 1999 Harvard Business Review article "Unbundling the Corporation," which received the McKinsey Award for best article published in that journal, for coining the concept of the "infomediary" in collaboration with Jeffrey Rayport in a 1997 Harvard Business Review article and later formalizing it in his 1999 book Net Worth: Shaping Markets When Customers Make the Rules, and for founding and leading the Deloitte Center for the Edge, a Silicon Valley–based research unit, from 2007 to 2020.

Hagel authored or co-authored eight books published primarily by Harvard Business School Press, Basic Books, and McGraw-Hill, covering virtual communities, corporate strategy, business platforms, and organizational psychology. His research reports produced through the Deloitte Center for the Edge, particularly the annual Shift Index series, have been cited in academic journals, management publications, and policy discussions on long-term corporate performance. Since retiring from Deloitte in 2020, he has led Beyond Our Edge LLC, an advisory firm, and serves on the boards of the Santa Fe Institute and the Independent Institute.

== Education ==
Hagel received a Bachelor of Arts degree from Wesleyan University in 1972, where he studied African and Asian studies, reflecting interests developed during a childhood spent living in Latin America and Europe. He subsequently earned a Bachelor of Philosophy in Modern Middle Eastern Studies from the University of Oxford in 1974. In 1978, he completed both a Master of Business Administration from Harvard Business School and a Juris Doctor from Harvard Law School concurrently.

== Early career and Silicon Valley ==
After completing his graduate studies, Hagel began his professional career in management consulting at the Boston Consulting Group.He subsequently founded two Silicon Valley technology startups. From 1980 to 1982, he served as founder and chief executive of Sequoia Group, Inc., a value-added reseller providing turnkey computer systems to physicians.

== McKinsey & Company (1984–2000) ==
Hagel joined McKinsey & Company in 1984 and remained with the firm until 2000, as a principal. By his own account, he helped open the firm's first Silicon Valley office he was also a leader of McKinsey's Strategy Practice.

== Theoretical frameworks and publications ==
=== Infomediary concept (1997) ===
In January 1997, Hagel and Jeffrey Rayport, then a faculty member at Harvard Business School, published “The Coming Battle for Customer Information” in the Harvard Business Review, introducing the concept of the infomediary, a commercial entity acting as a personal custodian for consumer data profiles. The article argued that consumers would take ownership of information about themselves and demand value in exchange for it, and anticipated that companies it called "infomediaries" would broker that information to businesses on consumers' behalf.

=== Net Gain and Net Worth (1997–1999) ===
In 1996, Hagel and Arthur Armstrong co-authored The Real Value of On-Line Communities in the Harvard Business Review. In 1997, Hagel and Armstrong published Net Gain: Expanding Markets through Virtual Communities (Harvard Business School Press).

In 1999, Hagel and Marc Singer published ''Net Worth: Shaping Markets When Customers Make the Rules'' (Harvard Business School Press). In a related article, the authors described an "infomediary" as a company whose store of customer information permits it to control the flow of commerce on the Web.

=== Unbundling the Corporation (1999) ===
In 1999, Hagel and McKinsey colleague Marc Singer published "Unbundling the Corporation" in the ''Harvard Business Review''; the article was adapted from ''Net Worth''. The article argued that most large companies bundle three different kinds of business: a customer relationship business, a product innovation business, and an infrastructure business, each driven by different economics (scope, speed, and scale, respectively). It contended that "interaction costs", the costs incurred whenever people and companies exchange goods, services, or ideas, had historically made bundling rational, but that electronic networks were reducing them and would push industries to reorganize.

The article received the 1999 McKinsey Award for best article in the ''Harvard Business Review'', announced in the journal's January–February 2000 issue. It was reprinted in the ''McKinsey Quarterly'' in June 2000.

=== The Only Sustainable Edge (2005) ===
In 2005, Hagel and John Seely Brown published The Only Sustainable Edge: Why Business Strategy Depends on Productive Friction and Dynamic Specialization.

=== The Power of Pull (2010) ===
In 2010, Hagel, John Seely Brown, and Lang Davison published The Power of Pull: How Small Moves, Smartly Made, Can Set Big Things in Motion. Announcing a talk by Hagel on the book, the Haas School of Business described it as arguing that society had spent the past century perfecting approaches that "push" resources in advance to areas of highest anticipated need, and that a shift to a "pull" model was under way.

=== The Journey Beyond Fear (2021) ===
In May 2021, McGraw-Hill published The Journey Beyond Fear: Leverage the Three Pillars of Positivity to Build Your Success. According to Hagel, the book starts from the observation that fear is becoming the dominant emotion for people around the world and explores approaches for cultivating hope and excitement.

The Journey Beyond Fear (2021) was reviewed in academic literature, including The Independent Review and the Review of Austrian Economics, which analyzed its organizational framework on prospective narratives.

The book was reviewed by Richard E. Wagner in the Review of Austrian Economics.

== Advisory roles and affiliations ==
Hagel has been a Forum Fellow of the World Economic Forum and co-chaired its Global Future Council on Platforms and Systems, in which capacity he discussed the role of platforms and systems in the Fourth Industrial Revolution.

Hagel serves on the Board of Trustees of the Santa Fe Institute and the Independent Institute, a New Mexico research center that studies complex adaptive systems. He also serves on the board of directors of the Independent Institute, a public policy research organization. He has been a faculty member at Singularity University.

Hagel has been quoted in major business and general-interest publications including The Economist, Fortune, Forbes, BusinessWeek, the Financial Times, the Wall Street Journal and the New York Times. He received several industry recognitions: Business Week named him one of the 25 most influential people in electronic business in 1999; Upside magazine designated him one of the Elite 100 Most Influential People in the Digital World in 1999; Network World included him among its 50 most powerful people in networking in 2002; and Accenture listed him among its Top 100 Business Gurus in 2003.

== Selected bibliography ==
Year	Title	Co-author(s)	Publisher
1997	Net Gain: Expanding Markets through Virtual Communities	Arthur G. Armstrong	Harvard Business School Press
1999	Net Worth: Shaping Markets When Customers Make the Rules	Marc Singer	Harvard Business School Press
1999	"Unbundling the Corporation" (Harvard Business Review, vol. 77, pp. 133–141) [McKinsey Award]	Marc Singer	Harvard Business Review
2002	Out of the Box: Strategies for Achieving Profits Today and Growth Tomorrow through Web Services	—	Harvard Business School Press
2005	The Only Sustainable Edge: Why Business Strategy Depends on Productive Friction and Dynamic Specialization	John Seely Brown	Harvard Business School Press
2009	"The Big Shift: Measuring the Forces of Change" (Harvard Business Review, July–August 2009)	John Seely Brown, Lang Davison	Harvard Business Review
2010	The Power of Pull: How Small Moves, Smartly Made, Can Set Big Things in Motion	John Seely Brown, Lang Davison	Basic Books
2021	The Journey Beyond Fear: Leverage the Three Pillars of Positivity to Build Your Success	—	McGraw-Hill

== External link ==
- Official website
