= Rustavi 2 =

Georgian television channel

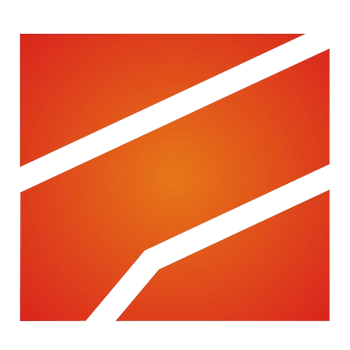
- Logo used since 2009
- Country: Georgia
- Headquarters: Tbilisi

Programming
- Languages: Georgian, English
- Picture format: 16:9 HDTV

Ownership
- Owner: Kibar Khalvashi (2019-)
- Key people: CEO: Nino Shubladze

History
- Launched: 1 June 1994
- Founder: Erosi Kitsmarishvili; David Dvali; Jarji Akimidze

Links
- Website: www.Rustavi2.ge

Rustavi 2 (Georgian: რუსთავი 2, romanized: rustavi 2, "Rustavi ori") is a Georgian free-to-air television channel based in Tbilisi, that was founded in 1994 in the town of Rustavi (hence its name).

It is an associate member of the European Broadcasting Union. Its news service has bureaus and regional reporters in major Georgian cities (Kutaisi, Batumi, Gori, Poti, Zugdidi), as well as permanent correspondents in Washington, D.C., Brussels and Moscow. The independence of the channel was questioned recently, with many suggesting that it was biased in favor of the former ruling party UNM, and recently in favor of the current ruling party Georgian Dream.

== History ==
It was formed in 1994 and had been in a strong opposition to Eduard Shevardnadze’s government since then. At launch (the channel opened on 1 June 1994) it was owned by Right-Wing Opposition figure Pikria Chikhradze and some of his friends, who obtained the license to broadcast on VHF channel 12 in Rustavi, hence the name. The channel shut down due to allegedly losing its license a year later. Broadcasts restarted in 1996 in Tbilisi, which explains why the channel is known as Rustavi 2.

The Georgian authorities made several attempts to shut R2 down. Giorgi Sanaia, Georgia’s most popular TV journalist, who worked for R2, was murdered in July 2001. It has been considered by many as a political murder related to his programme "Night Courier" and investigations of allegations of official corruption. In October 2001, the security police raid on the R2 office resulted in public anger and subsequent mass street demonstrations against the government's pressure on independent media forced Eduard Shevardnadze to fire his entire cabinet. On 15 March 2003, to coincide with the launch of its sister channel Imedi TV, Rustavi 2 introduced a new logo which consists of a zig-zagged abstract 2-numeral that is coloured bronze and are made up of gradient effects. Rustavi 2 was the main media source used as a tribune by the opposition leaders during the Rose Revolution in November 2003. On 25 December 2009, to celebrate its 15th anniversary, Rustavi 2 adopted a new logo during its Christmas special.

On 14 December 2012, Nika Gvaramia was appointed as the general director of the channel.

On 18 July 2019, he was replaced by Paata Salia, who is the lawyer of Kibar Khalvashi, current owner of the channel.

On 17 July 2025, Bakur Bakuradze became new general director.

On 1 May 2026, Head of the News Service of Rustavi 2 Nino Shubladze became new general director.

== Logos ==
First logo used from 1 June 1994 to 1996

Second logo used from 1996 to 2003

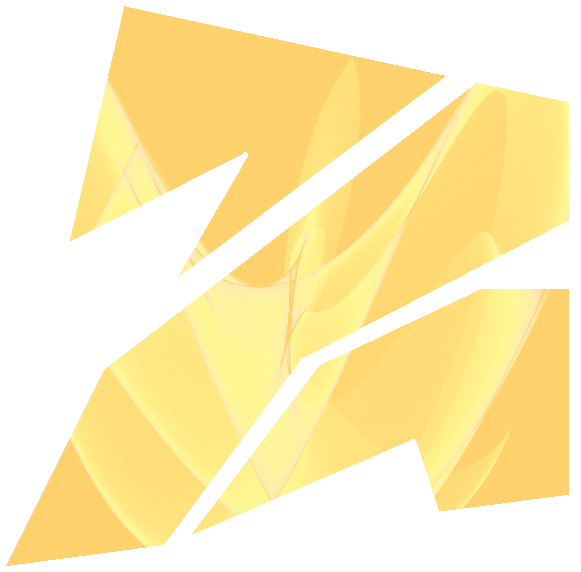
Third logo used from 2003 to 25 December 2009

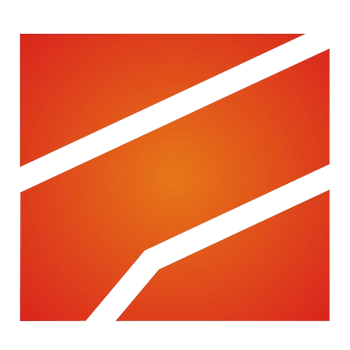
Fourth and current logo used from 25 December 2009 to 27 January 2014 and 23 January 2017–present

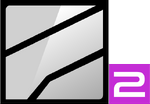
Fifth logo used from 27 January 2014 to 23 January 2017

== Programming ==
=== Original shows ===
- Cherry Street 12 (ალუბლების ქუჩა 12; transl. 12 Alublebi Street)
- Chveni opisi (ჩვენი ოფისი; transl. Our office)
- Kurieri (კურიერი; transl. Courier) — main newscast
- My Wife's Girlfriends (ჩემი ცოლის დაქალები)

=== Adaptations ===
- GeoBar — from Baren
- Gvachvene sheni khma (გვაჩვენე შენი ხმა; transl. Show me your voice!) and Imghere (იმღერე; lit. 'Sing it!') — from I Can See Your Voice
- Ighbliani borbali (იღბლიანი ბორბალი; transl. Wheel of fortune) — from the American series of the same name
- Geostar (ჯეოსტარი) — from Pop Idol
- Kandidati (კანდიდატი; transl. Candidate) — first adaptation of The Apprentice
- Khalkhis pirispir (ხალხის პირისპირ; transl. In front of the people) — from The People Versus
- Nichieri (ნიჭიერი; transl. Talented) — from Britain's Got Talent
- Qveladze chkviani (ყველაზე ჭკვიანი; transl. The smartest) — from Britain's Brainiest
- Susti rgoli (სუსტი რგოლი; transl. Weak link) — from The Weakest Link
- TOP gogo (TOP გოგო; transl. TOP girl) — from America's Next Top Model
- GMiri (უკანასკნელი გმირი; transl. The Last Hero) — from Expedition Robinson and Survivor
- Va-Bank (ვა-ბანკი; lit. 'All in') — from Deal or No Deal
- Star Academy (ვარსკვლავების აკადემია) — from Starmaker
- Vis Unda 20000? (ვის უნდა ოცი ათასი?; transl. Who Wants ₾20000?) — from Who Wants to Be a Millionaire?
- X Factor Georgia — from the British series of the same name

=== Foreign shows ===
- Bad Girls
- İffet
- La viuda joven
- Lale Devri — as Titebis periodi (ტიტების პერიოდი; lit. 'Tulip age')
- Lipstick Jungle
- Pecados ajenos
- Rebelde Way — as Meambokhe sulebi (მეამბოხე სულები; transl. Rebellious souls)
- Romeo y Julieta
- Son — as Dasasruli (დასასრული; transl. The end)
- Tierra de Pasiones — as Vnebata mitsa (ვნებათა მიწა; transl. The land of passions)

== Ownership ==
Rustavi 2 was originally owned by Erosi Kitsmarishvili, David Dvali, Jarji Akimidze and Nika Tabatadze. In July 2004, 90% of the company's shares were bought by the Batumi-based businessman Kibar Khalvashi, who was forced by then president Mikheil Saakashvili to sell the company, in January 2006, to David Bezhuashvili, member of the Parliament of Georgia and brother of Georgia's Foreign Minister Gela Bezhuashvili. In mid-2006 Rustavi 2, the television company Mze TV and radio station Pirveli Stereo merged into a holding which is currently owned by the Georgian Industrial Group (GIG) and GeoMedia Group. GIG, which owns a 45% share of both stations, is a large company with diversified business interests ranging from coal mining and energy to travel. Davit Bezhuashvili, is a founding member of the group. The GeoMedia group is a relatively obscure company registered in the Marshall Islands.

On 2 March 2017, the Supreme Court of Georgia declared that the owners of the company were Kibar Khalvashi (60% shares) and Panorama Ltd. (40% shares). On 3 March the company submitted an appeal to the European Court of Human Rights, which, in its turn, on 4 March 2017 suspended the Supreme Court decision until 8 March and requested additional documentation. On 18 July 2019, the European Court of Human Rights found no violation by the Georgian courts in the Rustavi 2 case which lifted the suspension mechanism, thus returning the company to its owner, Kibar Khalvashi.

== Perception of bias ==
From February 2012 – August 2014, the National Democratic Institute conducted polls which included a question about which media organizations represented the interest of which political factions. A plurality of respondents in each case believed that Rustavi 2 represented the United National Movement (or, in the case of the February 2012 poll, the government, which was at the time controlled by the UNM). The results of the polls which asked this question is summarized below.

Percent of respondents who believe that Rustavi 2 represents the interests of a political faction
Date	Represents UNM	Neither/None	Don't Know	Other
February 2012	69% (Government)	8%	21%	2%
November 2012	58%	13%	25%	4%
June 2013	47%	15%	32%	6%
September 2013	47%	24%	24%	4%
November 2013	39%	29%	26%	6%
April 2014	46%	22%	28%	4%
August 2014	42%	20%	35%	3%

According to Rustavi 2 statement on Self-regulation, an interested person who believes that "Rustavi 2" has violated any ethical standards established by the "Code of Conduct of Broadcasters" and his rights, can appeal to the broadcaster with a complaint and demand a response.
