= Fisher Island, Florida =

- Census-designated place
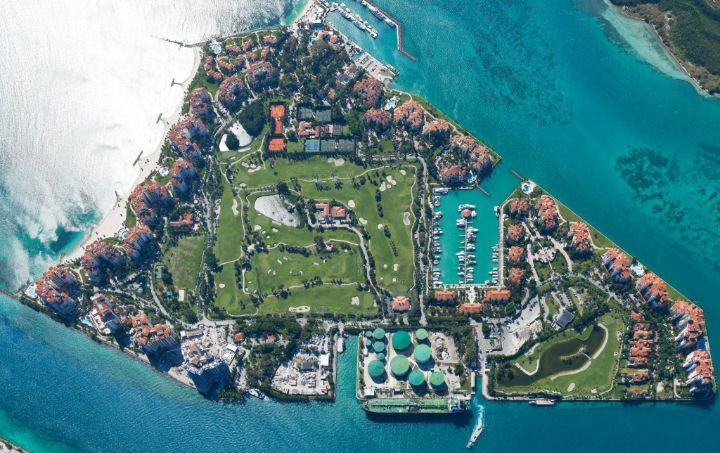
- Aerial view of Fisher Island

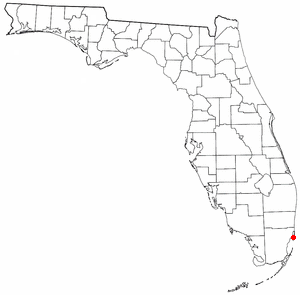
- Location of Fisher Island in Florida

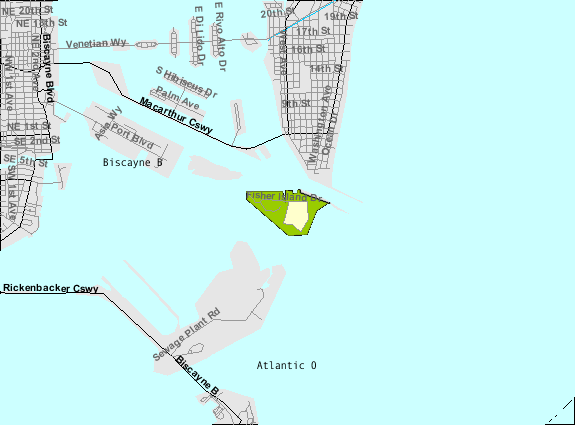
- U.S. Census Bureau map showing CDP boundaries
- Coordinates: 25°45′39″N 80°08′30″W
- Country: United States
- State: Florida
- County: Miami-Dade

Area
  - Total: 0.27 sq mi (0.69 km^{2})
  - Land: 0.24 sq mi (0.62 km^{2})
  - Water: 0.027 sq mi (0.07 km^{2})
- Elevation: 7 ft (2.1 m)

Population (2020)
  - Total: 561
  - Density: 2,330/sq mi (899/km^{2})
- Time zone: UTC-5 (Eastern (EST))
  - Summer (DST): UTC-4 (EDT)
- ZIP Code: 33109 (Miami Beach)
- Area codes: 305, 786, 645
- FIPS code: 12-22375
- GNIS feature ID: 2402483

Fisher Island is a census-designated place in Miami-Dade County, Florida, United States, located on a barrier island of the same name in the Miami metropolitan area of South Florida. As of the 2020 census, it had a population of 561.

Fisher Island is a private residential and resort community recognized for its high concentration of wealth and restricted access. Media and real estate reports frequently cite it as one of the most expensive and affluent Zip codes in the United States.

Named for automotive parts pioneer and real estate developer Carl G. Fisher, who once owned it, Fisher Island later became associated with the Vanderbilt family, whose private estate helped establish the island's enduring prestige. Unlike other wealthy enclaves in the United States, Fisher Island has no road or causeway connection to the mainland; it is accessible only by yacht or private ferry, with ferry guests required to obtain pre-arranged security clearance.

== History ==
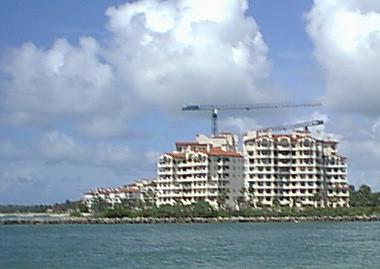
Buildings under construction in the summer of 2001

Fisher Island was created through the dredging of Government Cut, which separated the landmass from the barrier island that later became Miami Beach. Dredging began in 1905 and was completed in 1911.

In May 1918, businessman and real estate developer Dana A. Dorsey purchased what was then known as Terminal Island. Dorsey, described by the City of Miami Beach as one of the first Black millionaires in Florida and the American South, reportedly envisioned the island as a resort destination for Black families and professionals during the segregation era. The project was not realized, and the island was sold the following year to Carl G. Fisher.

In 1919, Fisher's Alton Beach Realty Company acquired the island from Dorsey and began expanding it for real-estate development. In the late 1920s, Fisher traded part of the island to William Kissam Vanderbilt II in exchange for Vanderbilt's yacht Eagle. Vanderbilt later expanded his holdings and built a private winter estate designed by architect Maurice Fatio.

Following Vanderbilt's death in 1944, his widow sold the estate to U.S. Steel heir Edward S. Moore. After Moore's death, the property was acquired by speedboat racer and inventor Gar Wood, who retained it as a private retreat. In 1963, Wood sold his estate to an investment group led by Bebe Rebozo that included Richard Nixon, George Smathers, and several other investors.

From 1972 to 1990, the University of Miami operated the Comparative Sedimentology Laboratory on Fisher Island through what is now the Rosenstiel School of Marine, Atmospheric, and Earth Science.

After further changes in ownership and a long period of limited activity, residential development began in the early 1980s. Fisher Island Club opened in 1987, marking the island's transformation into a luxury residential and resort community.

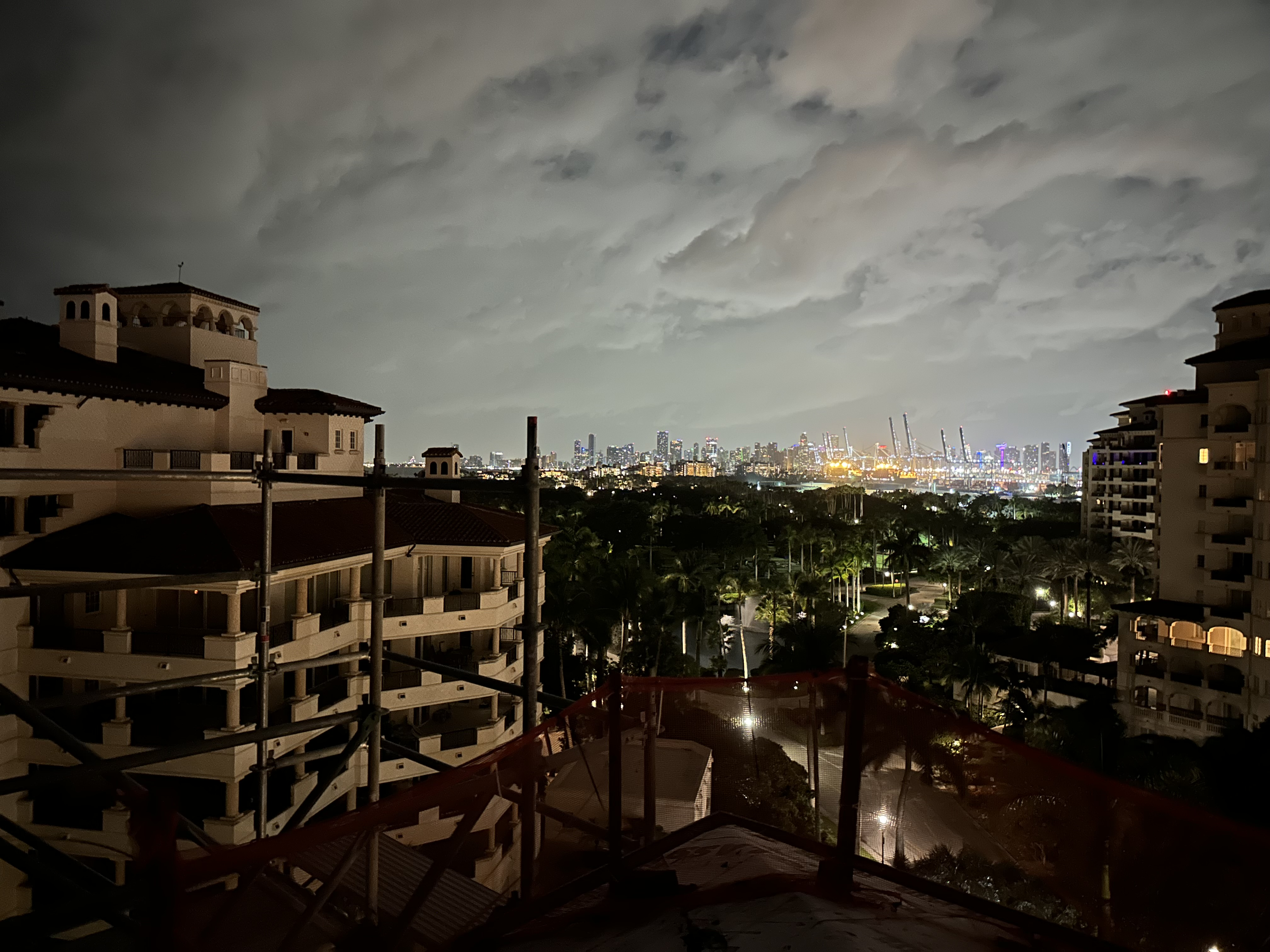
Aerial view of Fisher Island in 2024

Efforts to incorporate Fisher Island as a municipality were considered by Miami-Dade County in 2000 and revisited in 2005. In 2005, the county commission authorized further study of the proposal, but Fisher Island did not incorporate as a town or city.

In 2006, the Service Employees International Union began organizing Fisher Island workers in an effort to seek recognition as their bargaining representative. The campaign drew national attention in 2007, when The New York Times reported on disputes over wages, benefits, and working conditions on the island. One of Fisher Island's last major developable parcels, a 15-acre (6.1 ha) site facing the shipping channel between the island and Miami Beach, became the subject of a prolonged legal dispute in the early 2010s. The conflict involved Inna Gudavadze, widow of Georgian businessman Badri Patarkatsishvili, and parties aligned with Joseph Kay over control of development rights associated with the property. Related litigation continued in U.S. federal court, including proceedings addressed by the United States Court of Appeals for the Eleventh Circuit in 2015.

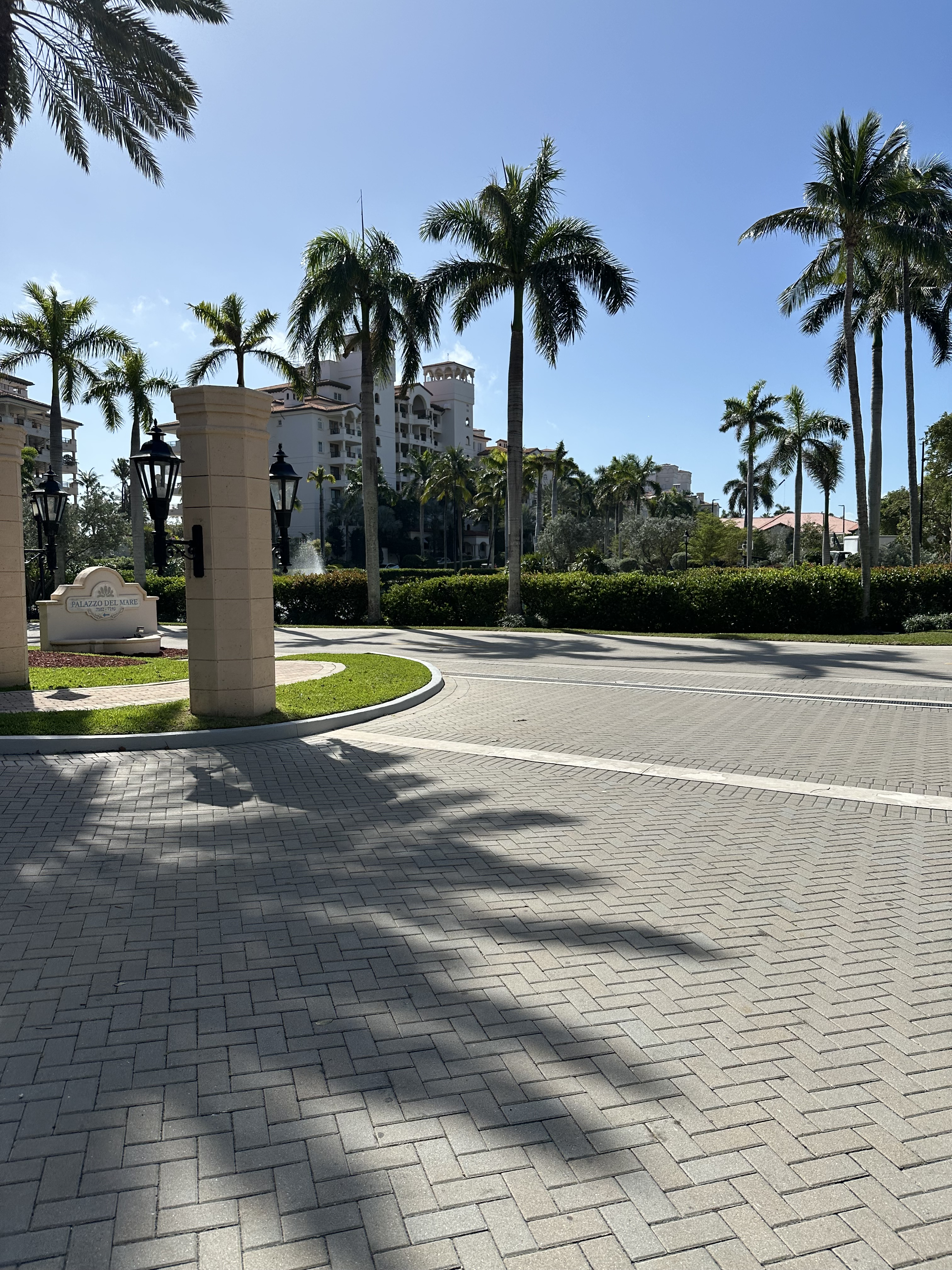
View from the Palazzo Del Mare apartment driveway

In 2020, Fisher Island attracted national attention during the COVID-19 pandemic after the Fisher Island Community Association, the island's master homeowners' association, was approved for a $2 million loan through the federal Paycheck Protection Program. After consulting residents, the association decided not to accept the funds.

In 2025, the sale of Fisher Island's marine fuel-terminal property triggered a major dispute over the future of the site. The facility, which served as PortMiami's principal marine-fuel storage site, was sold to HRP Group, which planned to redevelop the parcel for luxury residential use. Representatives of the Fisher Island Community Association opposed retaining the fuel tanks on the island; in September 2025, an attorney for the Fisher Island Community Association told Miami-Dade commissioners that residents did "not support anything that keeps the tanks there", while expressing support for environmental remediation and residential redevelopment of the property.

On October 9, 2025, the Miami-Dade County Commission adopted a resolution declaring acquisition of the fuel facility a public necessity and authorizing negotiations, purchase, or, if specified conditions were met, eminent domain proceedings to preserve fuel operations for PortMiami. In January 2026, Fisher Island Club and the Fisher Island Community Association filed a federal lawsuit seeking to block the county from seizing the property, arguing that alternative locations for the fuel facility had not been adequately considered. As of April 2026, Miami-Dade County and the property's owner remained in mediation.

== Geography ==
=== Location ===
Fisher Island lies at the southeastern edge of Biscayne Bay, immediately south of Miami Beach and east of PortMiami. Its northern shoreline faces Government Cut and the Miami Municipal Channel, which separate it from South Beach, while Norris Cut separates the island from Virginia Key to the south. The Atlantic Ocean lies to the east, and Biscayne Bay to the west.

The island occupies a highly strategic coastal position near the entrance to Miami Harbor. Miami-Dade County's PortMiami master-planning documents describe Fisher Island as lying directly east of the port and identify the Government Cut and turning-basin waters north of the island as part of the port's marine-access system.

According to the United States Census Bureau's 2022 Gazetteer Files, the Fisher Island census-designated place has a total area of 0.267 sq mi (0.69 km^{2}), of which 0.241 sq mi (0.62 km^{2}) is land and 0.026 sq mi (0.067 km^{2}) is water.

=== Coastal setting ===
The Florida Department of Environmental Protection places Fisher Island within the "Southern Barriers" coastal subregion of southeast Florida, which extends from Fisher Island to Cape Florida and also includes Virginia Key and Key Biscayne. In this system, Fisher Island is separated from Virginia Key by Norris Cut and from the mainland by Biscayne Bay.

Norris Cut is identified by the Florida Department of Environmental Protection as a stable natural inlet. Shore-protection works have nevertheless altered parts of the surrounding coastline: terminal groins were constructed along Norris Cut to help stabilize beaches on Fisher Island and Virginia Key. Fisher Island's shoreline has also been subject to beach-management projects. The Florida Department of Environmental Protection records a privately funded 1991 beach-erosion control project on Fisher Island that placed approximately 25,000 cu yd (19,000 m^{3}) of imported oolitic aragonite sand and installed eight rock T-head groins.

Miami-Dade County's coastal-construction review documents note that the state's Coastal Construction Control Line runs along Fisher Island and that many existing structures are located seaward of that line. The same review discusses the importance of flood, wave, and storm-surge standards for construction in coastal high-hazard areas.

=== Climate ===
Fisher Island lies within the Atlantic-facing coastal portion of Miami-Dade County, an area characterized by a tropical monsoon climate under the Köppen climate classification (Am). This tropical coastal climate is marked by warm temperatures year-round, high humidity, a pronounced wet season, and a comparatively drier winter season.

Climate normals from the nearby NOAA Miami Beach station for 1991–2020 show an annual mean temperature of 76.1 °F (24.5 °C), with a January mean of 67.4 °F (19.7 °C) and an August mean of 83.1 °F (28.4 °C). The same NOAA normals report average annual precipitation of 57.18 inches (1,452 mm), with rainfall concentrated in the warmer months. September is the wettest month on average, receiving 8.45 inches (215 mm) of precipitation.

The National Weather Service defines South Florida's wet season as extending from May 15 through October 15, when roughly 60 to 70 percent of the region's average annual rainfall occurs. The season is characterized by consistently high atmospheric moisture, frequent showers and thunderstorms, and rainfall patterns influenced by sea breezes, tropical waves, and occasional tropical cyclones. Because of its low-lying barrier-island setting, Fisher Island is also exposed to coastal hazards associated with tropical weather systems, including storm surge and hurricane-related flooding. Miami-Dade County describes storm surge as the greatest hurricane-related threat to life and property in coastal areas and maintains storm-surge planning zones for evacuation and emergency management.

=== Flora and fauna ===
Although Fisher Island is now extensively developed and landscaped, it retains the elements of its original ecology. Historical accounts describe its early landscape as a low-lying tract of coconut palms and mangroves in Biscayne Bay. Coconut palms remain a feature of the island's contemporary landscaped grounds, while mangroves continue to form part of its shoreline environment. A 2023 shoreline inspection prepared for the Fisher Island Community Association noted mangroves and other large vegetation along portions of the seawall, where they helped anchor soil and limit erosion.

The island's contemporary landscape is strongly associated with tropical palms and ornamental coastal vegetation. Palm tree-lined streets and tropical gardens extend throughout Fisher Island. Landscaped grounds document a large and wide variety of palms, including coconut palm (Cocos nucifera), European fan palm (Chamaerops humilis), lady palm (Rhapis excelsa), Florida thatch palm (Thrinax radiata), and saw palmetto (Serenoa repens), as well as several other palm species. The grounds also include sea grape (Coccoloba uvifera), gumbo limbo (Bursera simaruba), royal poinciana (Delonix regia), and numerous other tropical trees, shrubs, grasses, vines, and flowering plants. Native plants recommended by the Florida Department of Environmental Protection for southeastern Florida beachfront and dune settings, implemented in Fisher Island, also include buttonwood (Conocarpus erectus), white mangrove (Laguncularia racemosa), coco plum (Chrysobalanus icaco), and salt-tolerant palms such as the sabal palm (Sabal palmetto), silver palm (Coccothrinax argentata), and Everglades palm (Acoelorraphe wrightii).

Fisher Island is also associated with conspicuous ornamental and resident birdlife. The Fisher Island Club describes peacocks as part of the island's longstanding animal presence and states that tropical birds are historically kept since Vanderbilt era. The club also maintains an aviary housing more than 15 exotic birds, including cockatoos, cockatiels, macaws, amazon parrots, and conures.

The waters surrounding Fisher Island form part of the broader Biscayne Bay marine ecosystem. Miami-Dade County describes the bay's seagrass beds as habitat used by shrimp, fish, sea turtles, and manatees, while nearby reef communities support diverse marine life. Fisher Island's shoreline and adjacent waters have also been the subject of species-specific conservation documentation: a 1994 study examined sea turtle nests on Fisher Island after Hurricane Andrew, and in 2021 the Florida Fish and Wildlife Conservation Commission reported coral rescue collections from a Fisher Island coastal construction site as part of efforts to preserve corals vulnerable to stony coral tissue loss disease.

== Demographics ==
Historical population
Census	Pop.	Note	%±
2000	467		—
2010	132		−71.7%
2020	561		325.0%
U.S. Decennial Census

Fisher Island CDP, Florida – Racial and ethnic composition Note: the US Census treats Hispanic/Latino as an ethnic category. This table excludes Latinos from the racial categories and assigns them to a separate category. Hispanics/Latinos may be of any race.
Race / Ethnicity (NH = Non-Hispanic)	Pop 2010	Pop 2020	% 2010	% 2020
White (NH)	102	423	77.27%	75.40%
Black or African American (NH)	3	7	2.27%	1.25%
Native American or Alaska Native (NH)	0	0	0.00%	0.00%
Asian (NH)	6	19	4.55%	3.39%
Pacific Islander or Native Hawaiian (NH)	0	0	0.00%	0.00%
Some other race (NH)	0	8	0.00%	1.43%
Mixed race or Multiracial (NH)	1	28	0.76%	4.99%
Hispanic or Latino (any race)	20	76	15.15%	13.55%
Total	132	561	100.00%	100.00%

As of the 2010 United States census, there were 132 people, 94 households, and 85 families residing in the CDP. As of the 2020 United States census, there were 561 people, 197 households, and 131 families residing in the CDP. English is the first language for 84.6% of all residents, while Spanish was the first language for 15.4% of the population.

Bloomberg reported that the average income for Fisher Island was $2.5 million in 2015. This makes Fisher Island's zip code the wealthiest in the United States.

== Education ==
The island has a private school, Fisher Island Day School, which includes preschool through eighth grade for both on-island and off-island residents. The school was founded by Lexie and Robert Potamkin and Valerie and Michael Pearce in 2001. Approximately 30% of the students come from off-island, predominantly from the nearby Miami and Miami Beach neighborhoods of Star Island, Hibiscus Island, Palm Island, the Venetian Islands, Bayshore, South Beach, Pinecrest, Coral Gables, and Coconut Grove.

The island is served by Miami-Dade County Public Schools. It is zoned for South Pointe Elementary School, Nautilus Middle School, and Miami Beach Senior High School.

== Notable residents ==
=== Current ===
- Andre Agassi, former tennis player
- Barbara Becker, designer and socialite
- Enrique Bernoldi, former racing car driver
- Howard Brodie, U.S. ambassador to Finland since 2025
- Jeb Bush, governor of Florida from 1999 to 2007
- Bharat Desai, businessman
- Jim Ferraro, attorney
- Michael Flacks, investor
- Sharon Gless, actress
- Sergei Gonchar, former ice hockey player
- Steffi Graf, former tennis player
- Alan Hassenfeld, businessman
- Ilya Kovalchuk, former ice hockey player
- Karolina Kurkova, supermodel
- David Lee, former basketball player
- Howard Lorber, businessman
- Evgeni Malkin, ice hockey player
- Steele Platt, businessman
- Mark C. Rogers, physician
- Barney Rosenzweig, producer
- Felix Sater, real estate developer
- Caroline Wozniacki, former tennis player

=== Former ===
- Aras Agalarov, real estate developer
- Mel Brooks, actor
- Pavel Bure, former ice hockey player
- Carole Crist, first lady of Florida from 2008 to 2011
- Harold Ford Sr., former U.S. representative
- Igor Krutoy, composer
- Julia Roberts, actress
- Lawrence Stroll, businessman
- Oprah Winfrey, television host
- Martin Zweig, financial analyst

== See also ==
- Barrier island
- List of islands
