= Rustavi Steel =

Georgian industrial company

Rustavi Steel LLC
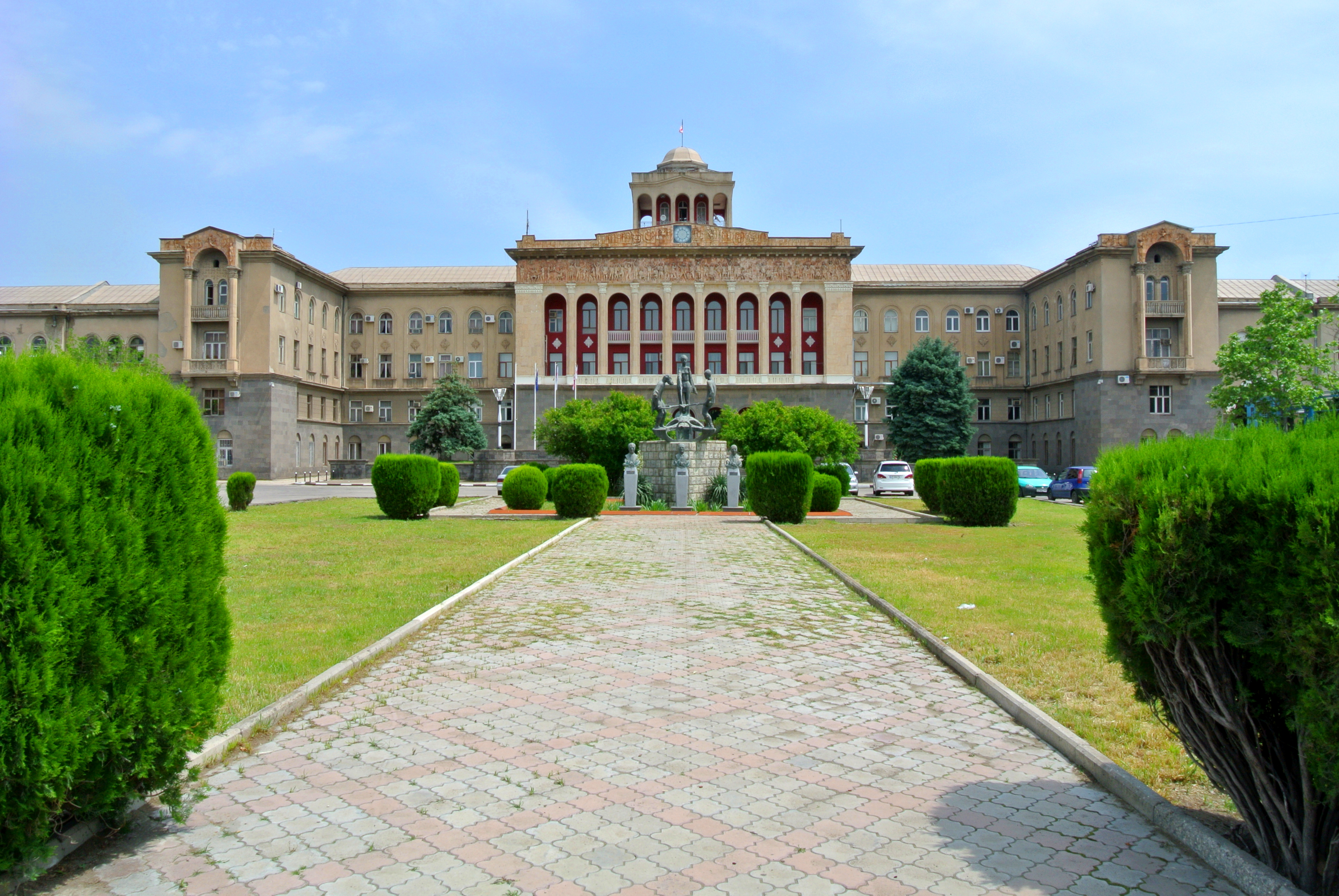
- Rustavi Metallurgical Plant Headquarters
- Industry: Steel and metals
- Founded: 2011
- Headquarters: Rustavi, Georgia
- Products: Pipes; Rebar; Square billet; Pig iron; Ferro alloys; Mechanical spare parts and steel constructions; Slag products
- Revenue: 322,330,000 Georgian lari (2022)
- Operating income: 14,338,000 Georgian lari (2022)
- Net income: 20,578,000 Georgian lari (2022)
- Total assets: 313,554,000 Georgian lari (2022)
- Number of employees: 1,600 (2024)

Rustavi Steel LLC is a Georgian company that was established in 2011 to acquire the assets of the Rustavi Metallurgical Plant. The Rustavi Metallurgical Plant industrial enterprise is situated 30 kilometres to the south of Georgia's capital, Tbilisi.

Rustavi Steel is the largest metallurgical plant in the Caucasus.

The Rustavi Metallurgical Plant was founded in 1948 as a metallurgical complex in the South Caucasus and produced various products made of pig iron, aluminium or iron. The plant produced seamless pipes for the needs of oil fields in Kazakhstan, Azerbaijan, Turkmenistan and the Middle East. The plant exports to the European Union, the United States, Middle Eastern, Armenia, Azerbaijan and Turkey markets.

The plant manufactures reinforcing bars, seamless pipes, square billets, pig-iron castings, mechanical parts, shaped castings, granulated slag, silicon-manganese, lime and limestone.

== Ownership ==
The Rustavi Metallurgical Plant was acquired by Georgian businessman Badri Patarkatsishvili via auction in 2005 for $35.5 million and was managed by Badri Patarkatsishvili with the assistance of his employee and distant relative, Joseph Kay. Following Badri's death in February 2008, Kay attempted to misappropriate various assets that belonged to Badri's widow, Inna Gudavadze and her family, including the Rustavi Steel plant, using a falsified will.

Under the government of Mikheil Saakashvili, Kay was able to obtain a judgement at the Tbilisi court that prevented the Patarkatsishvili family from taking control of Badri's Georgian assets, including Rustavi. In December 2008, Inna Gudavadze launched an international arbitration claim against the Georgian government, seeking the return of Rustavi and other assets, including the TV station Imedi, that had been seized by the government.

In July 2011, the Patarkatsishvili family reached a settlement with the government that saw the return of Rustavi to the family. Rustavi was subsequently sold, and it is now managed by Hunnewell Partners.
