= MacArthur Causeway =

Bridge in Florida, United States of America

MacArthur Causeway County Causeway
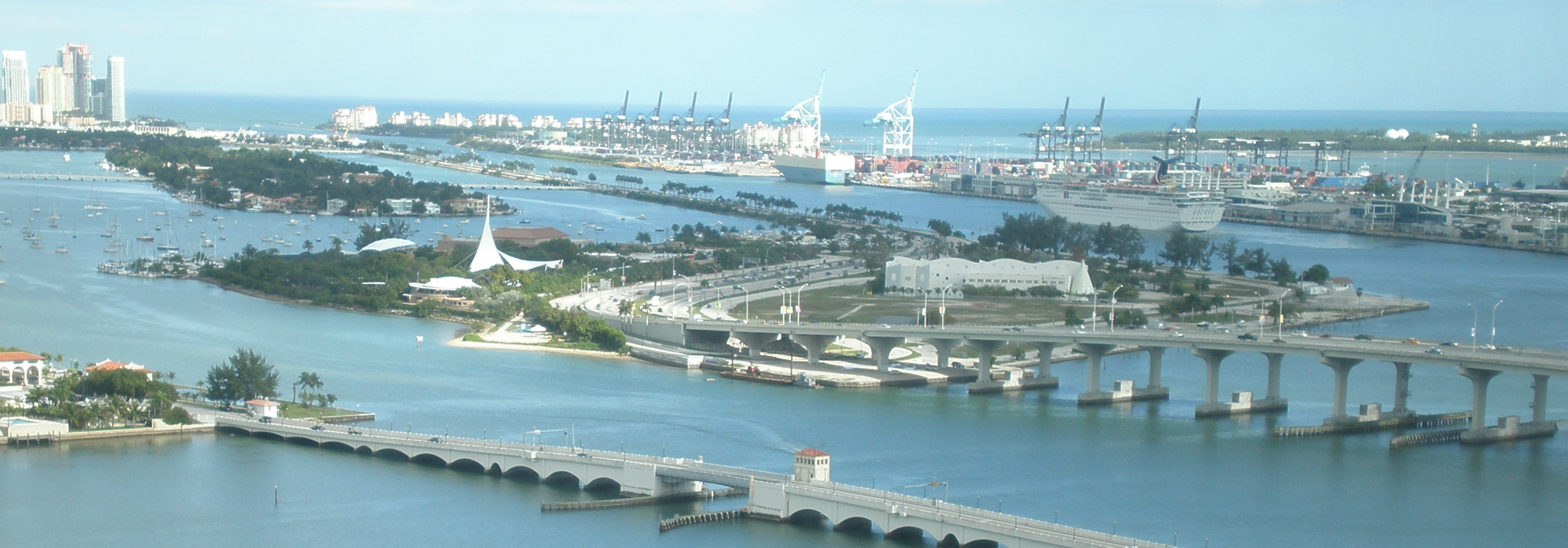
- MacArthur Causeway, connecting Downtown Miami and South Beach
- Coordinates: 25°46′40″N 80°09′51″W
- Carries: 6 lanes of SR A1A
- Crosses: Biscayne Bay
- Locale: Miami to Miami Beach
- Official name: General Douglas MacArthur Causeway
- Named for: Douglas MacArthur
- Maintained by: FDOT

Characteristics
- Design: Causeway, beam, girder
- Material: Slabs, girders, fill
- Total length: 3.5 miles (5.6 km)
- Longest span: 0.4 miles (0.64 km)
- Clearance above: 68 feet (21 m)

History
- Designer: Frederic R. Harris, Inc., American Bridge Company
- Opened: February 17, 1920; 106 years ago

Location
- Interactive map of MacArthur Causeway

The General Douglas MacArthur Causeway is a six-lane causeway that connects Downtown Miami to South Beach via Biscayne Bay in Miami-Dade County.

The highway is the singular roadway connecting the mainland and beaches to Watson Island and the bay neighborhoods of Palm Island, Hibiscus Island, and Star Island. The MacArthur Causeway carries State Road A1A over the Biscayne Bay via a girder bridge.

== History ==
In the late 1910s, with the deteriorating wooden Collins Bridge (now, the Venetian Causeway) as the only direct land route between mainland Miami and the barrier islands of Miami Beach, construction on the roadway began in 1917. The roadway, dedicated as the County Causeway, was completed in 1920. Watson Island was reclaimed surrounding the western end of the roadway, completed in 1926.

Having undergone several lane and structural expansions following opening of the original two-lane road, the State Road Board and Dade County Commission voted to rename the causeway in honor of World War II General Douglas MacArthur in 1942. The causeway was accessible from mainland Miami via Biscayne Boulevard and intersecting side streets through the 1960s. Construction of direct highway access to I-395 was complete in the 1970s. The replacement of the westernmost and easternmost spans began in the 1990s, as the eastbound lanes of the bridges were completed in 1995 and westbound lanes finished in 1997.

== Gallery ==
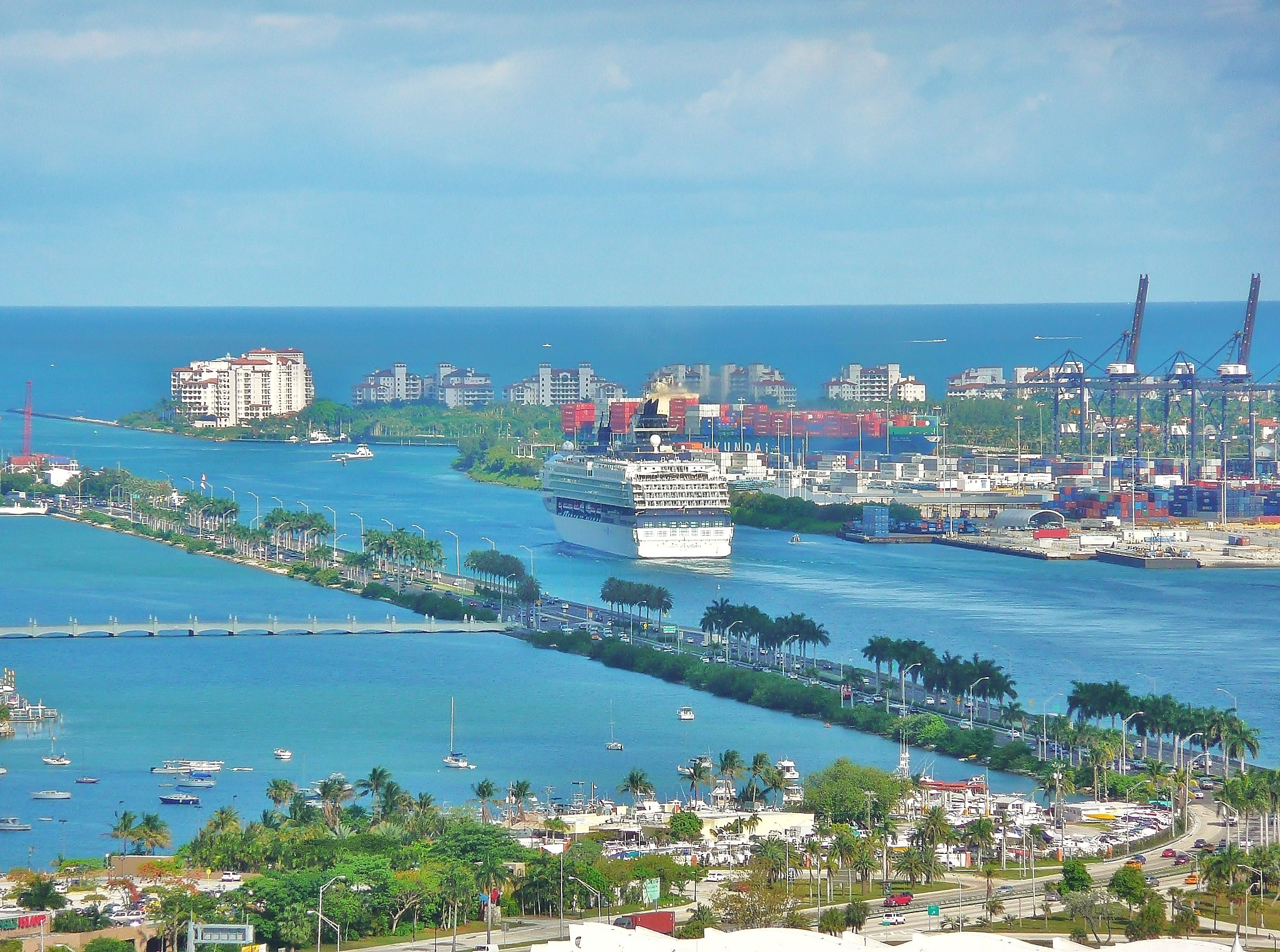
Large portion of the causeway. Fisher Island and Port of Miami are in the background. Watson Island is in the foreground.

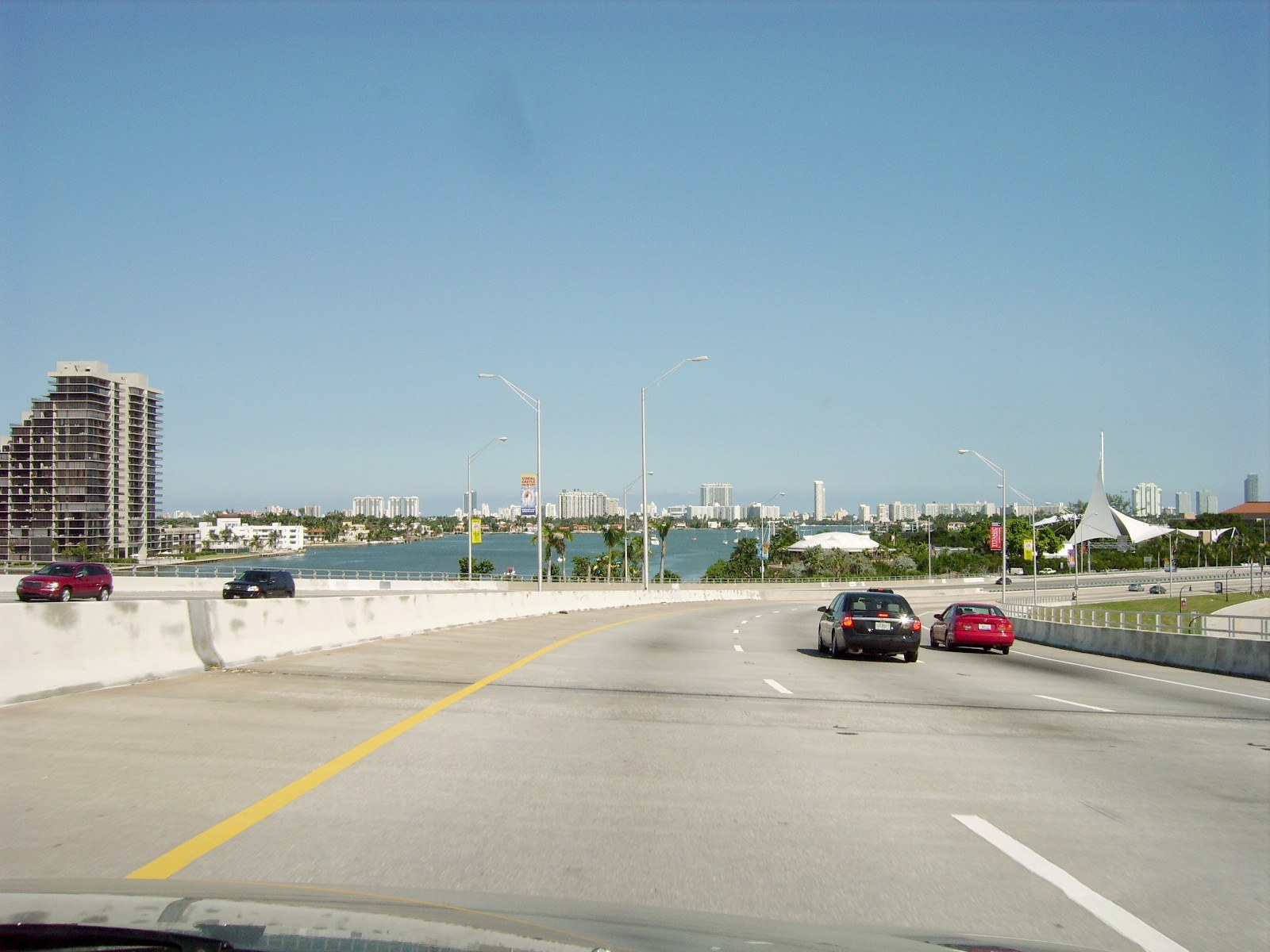
MacArthur Causeway eastbound from Miami to Miami Beach (in far background).

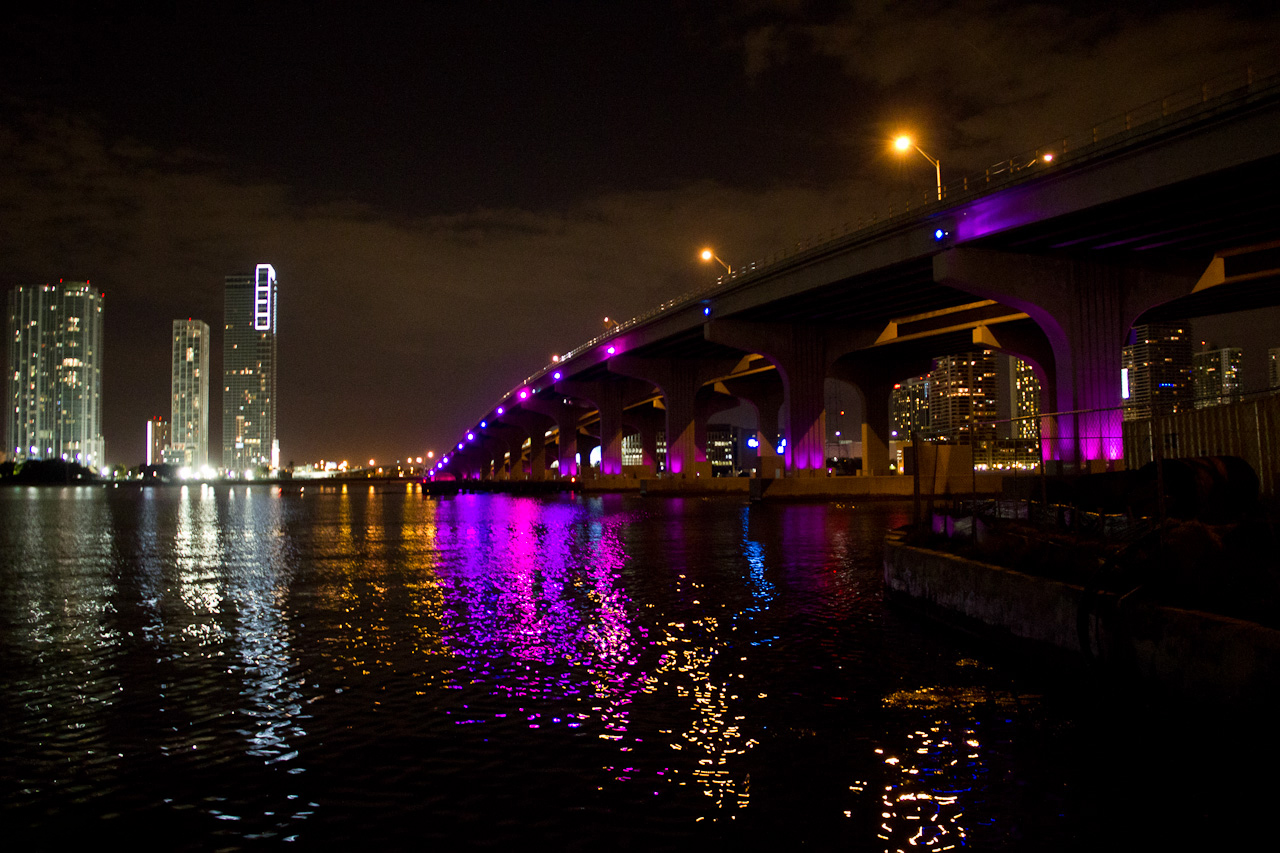
Macarthur Causeway at night as seen from Watson Island
