= Kommersant Dengi =

Russian business magazine (1994–2017)

- Categories: Business magazine
- Frequency: Weekly
- Publisher: Kommersant Publishing House
- Founded: 1994
- Final issue: January 2017 (print)
- Country: Russia
- Based in: Moscow
- Language: Russian
- Website: Kommersant Dengi

Kommersant Dengi was a weekly print business and finance magazine published in Moscow, Russia. In January 2017 the magazine became an online-only publication.

== History and profile ==
Kommersant Dengi was established in 1994. It was published by Kommersant Publishing House on a weekly basis. The company was owned by Boris Berezovsky from 1999 to 2006 and then was acquired by Badri Patarkatsishvili. The same year Alisher Usmanov bought the company. The magazine was headquartered in Moscow. Its sister publications included Kommersant Vlast, which was formerly named Kommersant-Weekly, and daily newspaper Kommersant. Sergei Yakovlev is among the former editors-in-chief of the magazine.

Kommersant Dengi carries analysis of financial markets and investments, and practical information about financial companies. In 2002 the magazine sold 85,000 copies. In January 2017 it was announced that the print version of the magazine closed and that it would continue as an online magazine.
