= Mtatsminda Park =

Park in Tbilisi, Georgia

Coordinates: 41.6933°N 44.7802°E

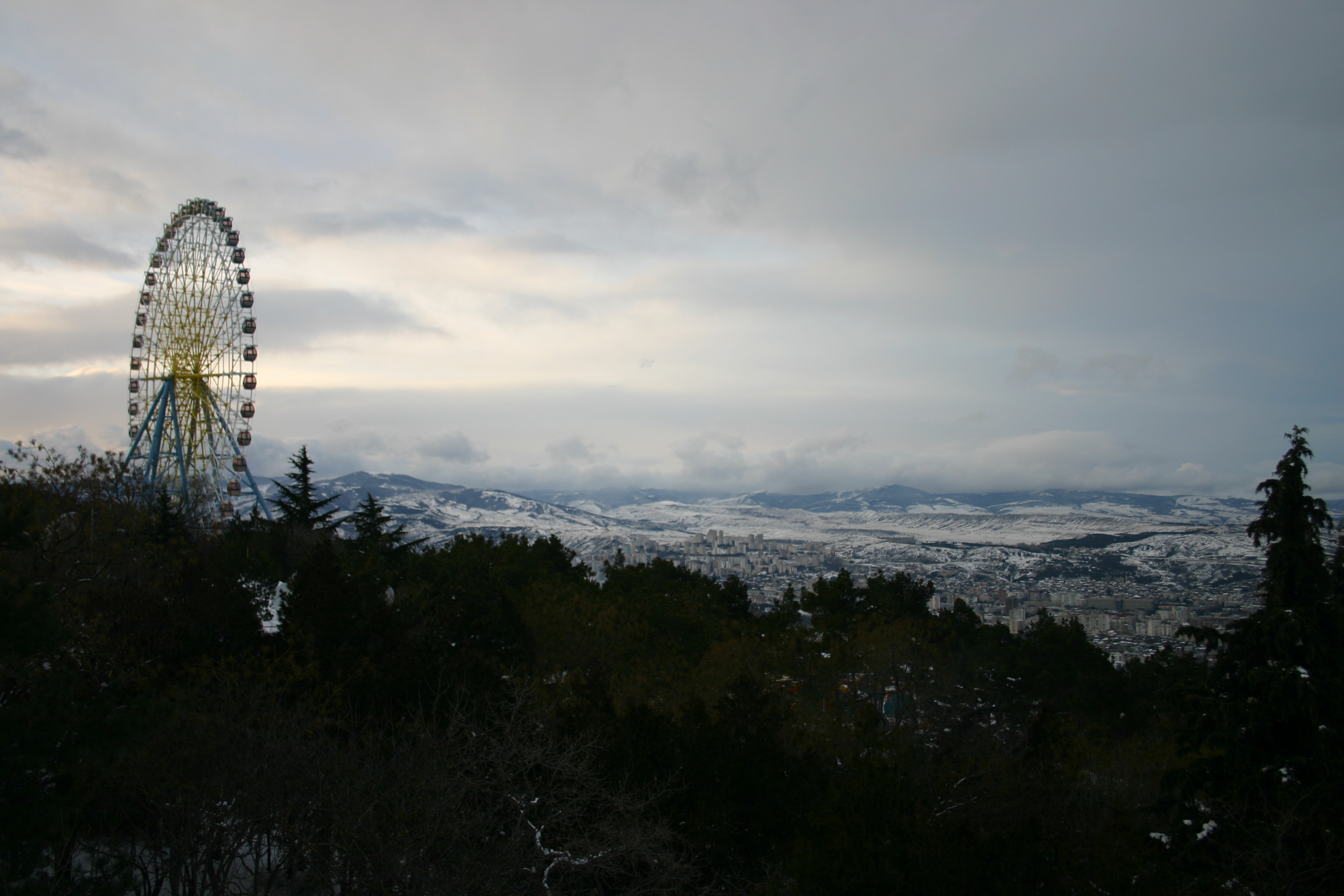
Mtatsminda Park at dusk, overlooking parts of Tbilisi

Mtatsminda Park is a landscaped park located at the top of Mount Mtatsminda overlooking the Georgian capital Tbilisi. The park has carousels, water slides, a roller-coaster, dark ride, funicular, and a big Ferris wheel at the edge of the mountain, offering a splendid view over the city.

== Overview ==
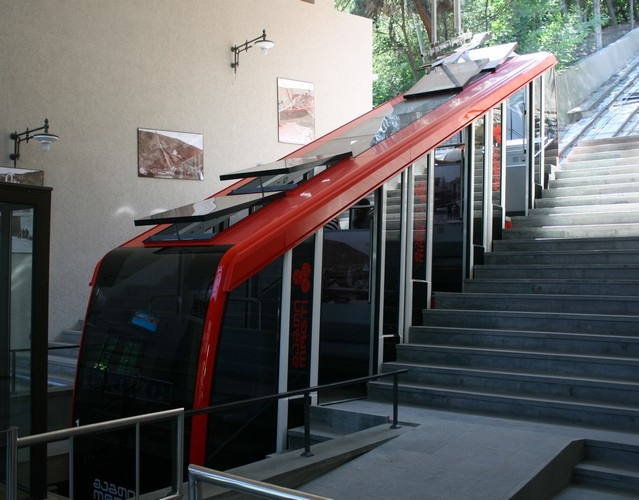
Tbilisi Funicular

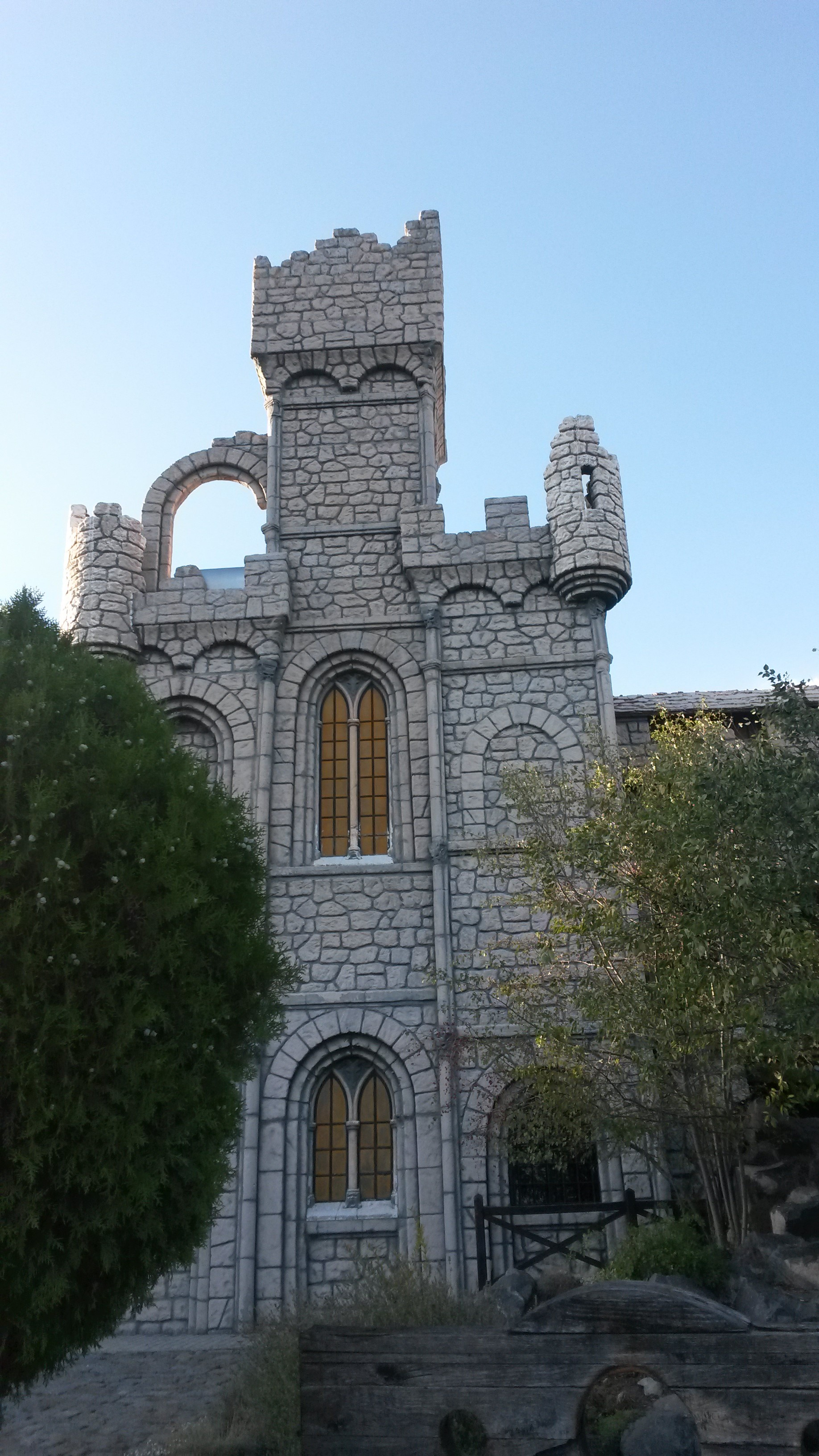
Ghost Castle

The park is situated at the 770 metres height, the highest point of Tbilisi, on the area of more than 100 hectares. It is connected to a motorway (Tbilisi-Okrokana Direction) as well as a funicular, built in 1905.

Tbilisi Funicular is a ropeway railway connecting Chonkadze street and Mtatsminda Park. The length of the funicular road is 501 m, the angle of the tunnel is 28-33°, and the distance between the stations is 0,98 m. The upper station is at 727 m above sea level and the lower station is at 460 m above sea level.

Giant Wheel is the highest attraction in Mtatsminda Park: it is 65 m high. The Giant Wheel completes one revolution in 10–12 minutes.

Ghost Castle is a dark ride featuring a series of horror scenes and special effects. This huge three-storey medieval castle was purchased from Luneur park and was originally known as "Legend".

== History ==
The park was founded by the Soviet government in the 1930s and was once noted as the 3rd most visited public park in the USSR.

In 2001, the late Georgian billionaire Badri Patarkatsishvili along with his wife, Inna Gudavadze, began transforming the park into a 21st-century theme park. Badri owned the park as a charitable project alongside a number of commercial assets in Georgia, included the Rustavi Steel Plant, Borjomi water, and Imedi TV station.

In 2007 Patarkatsishvili became a vocal opponent of the National Movement Party and as a result, fell out of favor with President Mikhail Saakashvili. On the 7 November 2007, his assets including Mtatsminda Park and the Imedi TV station were seized by the Government under claims that the company had “violated numerous times” the terms of the contract and had failed to pay a rental fee. Representatives of Patarkatsishvili immediately rejected this claims, saying that they were “baseless.”

After Patarkatsishvili's death at his home in England in February 2008, his widow Inna Gudavadze began international arbitration proceedings against the Government of Georgia, claiming that Mtatsminda Park, along with other Georgian assets, had been unfairly expropriated by the government. On the 29 October 2008, Inna Gudavadze said at a press conference in Tbilisi that Mtatsminda Park, as well as the Imedi TV station were “Badri’s personal projects for Georgia and the Georgian people" and that she had a "duty to see that these works are carried on.”

In July 2011, the Patarkatsishvili family reached a settlement with the government that saw Mtatsminda Park returned to Inna and the family in return for them renouncing all claims to the ownership of Imedi TV. Following the fall of President Mikhail Saakashvili, Imedi was also subsequently returned to Inna and her family in October 2012 under the new government.

== See also ==
- Mtatsminda Pantheon
- Tbilisi National Park
