= Imedi Media Holding =

Georgian media company

Imedi TV
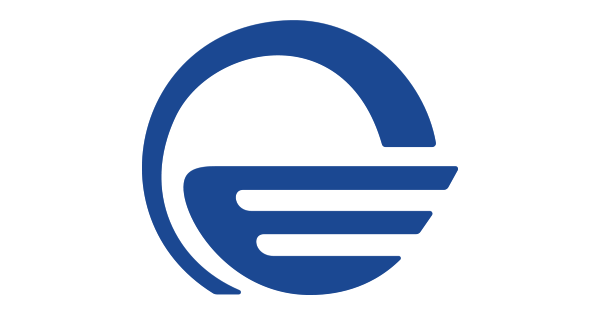
- Type: Broadcast radio network and television network
- Country: Georgia
- Availability: National
- Headquarters: Tbilisi
- Owner: Ilia Mikelaishvili (2026–)
- Key people: Maka Lomidze (CEO)
- Launch date: 15 March 2003; 23 years ago
- Official website: www.imedi.ge

Imedi Media Holding (Georgian: იმედი მედია ჰოლდინგი, romanized: imedi media holdingi) is a private television and radio company in Georgia. The stations were founded by the Georgian media tycoon Badri Patarkatsishvili. The station mainly concentrates on news and analytical coverage, but broadcasts pop music as well, particularly at nighttime. Imedi means "hope" in Georgian.

The station is currently considered to be a staunch supporter of the Georgian Dream–led government since 2012. Imedi is currently part owned by Prime Media Global and part owned by the Imedi management team, after they acquired the station from Irakli Rukhadze (Hunnewell Partners) in February 2026.

Imedi Media Holding, together with Pos TV, was sanctioned by the United Kingdom on 24 February 2026 under the Russia (Sanctions) (EU Exit) Regulations 2019 due to its assessed involvement in the dissemination of Russian state-aligned disinformation, placing it among media entities identified as contributing to information manipulation in support of the Kremlin’s strategic objectives.

== History ==
Radio Imedi first aired on 105.9 FM in December 2001 in Tbilisi. Since December 2003 "Radio Imedi" has broadcast 24 hours a day across all the settled territory in Georgia.

In March 2003, when Imedi was founded, it was the first independently owned broadcasting station in Georgia. During the 2007 Georgian demonstrations the station was the most watched station and the most critical of the Mikheil Saakashvili government. It remained the only independent station in the country until it was forcibly seized by government troops in 2007 and then expropriated from its legal owners for criticising the government.

During the Sandro Girgvliani murder investigation in 2006, Patarkatsishvili stated that the Georgian authorities were mounting pressure on his station and other businesses after it had broadcast details of the scandal. "It is no secret that Imedi television was the first one which reported the circumstances of Sandro Girgvliani’s murder...this alone became a reason for the authorities’ dissatisfaction, which triggered the financial authorities to actively launch a probe into my businesses and my companies so [as] to force me to mount pressure against [my] journalists and facilitate the creation of a favorable image of the authorities," Badri Patarkatsishvili went on to say that he would never yield to pressure from the authorities.

The station carried statements by opposition leaders and broadcast footage of police breaking up protests during the November 2007 Georgian demonstrations and went off-air after riot police burst into their offices on November 7, 2007. The seizure was seen as symbolic of the government's attacks on private property at the time.

The Georgian National Communications Commission (GNCC) suspended Imedi TV's broadcast license for a three-month period, citing violation of law on broadcasting by the television station. The GNCC says in its decision that on November 7, Imedi TV reported "an obvious disinformation that law enforcement officers were planning to storm cathedral of Holy Trinity... This report has created an imminent and real threat of overgrowing riots into large-scale massive unrests, which could eventually led to uncontrollable processes." Georgian officials further accused Patarkatsishvili of controlling the Imedi TV’s editorial policy and using it for inciting unrests. As a proof for their allegations, Georgia's General Prosecutor's Office released, on November 16, 2007, several taped phone conversations between Patarkatsishvili and Giorgi Targamadze, chief of Imedi TV’s political programs, and also between a producer and a journalist of Imedi TV. The government's closure of the station and the handling of the demonstration were criticised by the West.

Meanwhile, Rustavi 2, which was regarded as close to the government, TV aired on 16 November a half-hour documentary about Imedi TV's role in the anti-governmental demonstrations, which is based exclusively on an interview of deputy chief prosecutor, Nika Gvaramia.

Tbilisi City Court ruled on December 6, 2007, to unfreeze Imedi's assets – the last remaining legal obstacle for the television station to get back on air. The company's management stated that the studio equipment was badly damaged in a November 7 police raid. Later, on December 12, 2007, Imedi TV resumed broadcasts thirty-four days after the television station was shut down. A criminal case against its co-owner, Badri Patarkatsishvili, was launched however, Patarkatsishvili denied the charges against him, claiming that they were politically motivated.

On December 26, 2007, several leading journalists from Imedi TV left their jobs following the release of video and audio recordings by the authorities suggesting that Badri Patarkatsishvili, the station's founder and co-owner, was plotting a coup. Later that day, the television station’s management announced that Imedi TV temporarily suspended broadcasts until the station's "legal status in respect of ownership is not clarified." "By doing so we are distancing from dirty political games", said Giorgi Targamadze, head of the Imedi TV's political programs. Former Imedi TV journalists entered politics and founded Christian-Democratic Movement.

Badri Afanasyev, a former Imedi producer, asked for political asylum in Russia on 17 October 2009.

== Ownership issue ==
A preliminary agreement on the purchase of Imedi Holding’s shares was signed in New York City on April 28, 2007, between Badri Patarkatsishvili and News Corporation, the details of which remained confidential. No equity is thought to have changed hands, although it has been reported that Badri Patarkatsishvili may have handed over some control of the station to News Corporation to defend it against politically motivated attacks from Mikheil Saakashvili. Patarkatsishvili was at the time running in opposition against Saakashvili in the Georgian presidential election, 2008.

After Patarkatsishvili's death in February 2008, the issue of ownership of Imedi again came to public attention. Joseph Kay, the stepson of Patarkatsishvili's aunt, along with the American lawyer, Emmanuel Zeltser, attempted to take control of Imedi, as well as other assets belonging to the Patarkatsishvili family, by claiming to be in possession of Patarkatsishvili's last will and testament that appointed Kay as executor of the estate. These documents were later declared to be forgeries in the UK High Court.

Kay obtained judgement in Tbilisi Court that prevented Patarkatsishvili's family from taking control of his assets in Georgia, including the Imedi stations. Kay claimed that Patarkatsishvili had asked him shortly before his death "to take care of Imedi" and pledged to "restore the face it [Imedi] had before Badri Patarkatsishvili went into politics." He rejected the allegations voiced by some Georgian opposition politicians that the authorities were, in fact, behind the deal. Giorgi Jaoshvili, a Georgian businessman and former executor of Patarkatsishvili's estate, accused the authorities of using "psychological pressure" in order to "force" him to give up his shares in Imedi to Joseph Kay.

In December 2008, Patarkatsishvili's widow, Inna Gudavadze, launched an international arbitration claim against the Georgian Government, seeking the return of Imedi and other assets that had been seized by Mikheil Saakashvili's government.

In July 2011, the Patarkatsishvili family reached a settlement with the government that saw the return of Imedi to government nominees. The arbitration proceeding had been putting a substantial financial burden on the Georgian taxpayers and so the Patarkatsishvili family decided to reach what at the time was called a "reciprocal compromise" that saw the family renounce all claims to the ownership of Imedi TV and Mtatsminda Park. The details of the settlement were not released at the time; however, they were eventually published in January 2014.

Until October 2012, the station was effectively under government control and received criticism for being partisan. Elsa Vidal, from the watchdog group Reporters Without Borders, described the transfer of ownership as "a huge setback for freedom of expression". The station manager Giorgi Arveladze was the country's former economics minister and a longtime friend of President Mikhail Saakashvili. Georgia Media Production Group, which owns Imedi was at the time 45 owned by Giorgi Arveladze. Giorgi Korakhashvili and Giorgi Mikeladze held 30 and 15 percent of shares respectively, and the remaining 10% was held by Joseph Kay.

Following parliamentary elections in 2012, on 16 October, the new government began the process of returning Georgia Media Production Group, and Imedi to the Patarkatsishvili family. Giorgi Targamadze, a politician and former Imedi journalist, explained that this was a "logical" and "appropriate" end to the story. "Badri Patarkatsishvili founded Imedi TV, and it was thanks to him that the company functioned for several years. And I don't think anyone ever doubted that this television company belonged to Patarkatsishvili's family. In other words, justice has been restored," Targamadze told reporters. Following a court order in November 2012, Joseph Kay returned the final 10% of Georgia Media Production Group to the Patarkatsishvili family, making Inna Gudavadze the 100% owner of Imedi. On the 5 November 2012, Liana Zhmotova, Inna Gudavadze and Badri Patarkatsishvili's daughter became director general of Georgia Media Production Group.

Natela Patarkatsishvili, Badri Patarkatsishvili's mother, has since asked for those responsible for the "criminal expropriation" of Badri's assets, including Mikheil Saakashvili and Giorgi Arveladze, to be brought to justice. On the 23 February 2013, Tbilisi Mayor Gigi Ugulava was charged with the misappropriation of Imedi. An investigation found that the mayor's office had put pressure on Joseph Kay to hand over his shares in the company to the government. Following this, it was suggested by Georgian Chief Prosecutor Archil Kbilashvili that Mikheil Saakashvili should be summoned as a witness in the case. "Reasoning from Joseph Kay's testimony, he confirms that all actions, taken by the former government officials for misappropriation of the TV company, had been coordinated with the Georgian President. In order to clarify the matter, the President may be summoned for interrogation as a witness", local media quoted Kbilashvili as saying.

Imedi is currently part owned by Prime Media Global and part owned by the Imedi management team, after they acquired the station from Hunnewell Partners in February 2026.

== 2010 Russian invasion hoax ==
On the evening of 13 March 2010, when the Georgian government had effective control of Imedi, the station aired a deliberate false report that caused a shockwave across the country. According to the false news, Russia invaded Georgia after a “terror attack” on the president of South Ossetian republic, Eduard Kokoity. The report suggested that four Georgian soldiers in South Ossetia had been killed, and that President Mikhail Saakashvili and his government had been evacuated. In several minutes, however, the source “reported” the death of Saakashvili and the creation of the people’s government headed by one of the opposition leaders, Nino Burjanadze. The program, which lasted for half an hour, also reported about aerial bombardment of the country’s air and seaports and only at the end, the Imedi presenters pointed out that this was a “special report about possible development of the events”. At the beginning of the broadcast, there were also warnings that the program showed a sequence of possible events that could only occur "if Georgian society is not brought together against Russia's plans."

The hoax was condemned by many public figures both in Georgia and abroad, including Georgian patriarch Ilia. Burjanadze is considering filing a legal issue against Imedi. The report caused widespread panic in Georgia. Many civilians fled their homes to escape the "invasion", while units of the Georgian Army took up defensive positions. There were instances of heart attacks and fainting upon news of the invasion.

== See also ==
- Simulated Kronika
