= Giorgi Arveladze =

Georgian politician

- გიორგი არველაძე
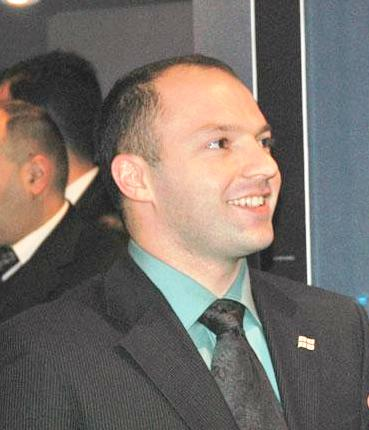
- Arveladze in 2006

Minister of Economic Development
- In office November 20, 2006 – January 31, 2008
- President: Mikheil Saakashvili
- Prime Minister: Zurab Noghaideli; Lado Gurgenidze
- Deputy: David Natroshvili; Kakha Damenia; Tamar Kovziridze
- Preceded by: Irakli Okruashvili
- Succeeded by: Ekaterine Sharashidze

Head of the Administration of the President of Georgia
- In office October 19, 2005 – November 19, 2006
- President: Mikheil Saakashvili

Member of the Parliament of Georgia
- In office April 22, 2004 – October 18, 2005

Press Secretary for the President of Georgia
- In office November 2003 – February 2004
- President: Mikheil Saakashvili

Member of the Tbilisi City Assembly
- In office November 2002 – November 2003

Secretary General of United National Movement
- In office October 2001 – December 29, 2006
- Succeeded by: Davit Kirkitadze

Personal details
- Born: July 10, 1978 (age 48) Tbilisi, Georgian SSR, Soviet Union
- Party: United National Movement
- Other political affiliations: Batkivshchyna (Ukrainian)
- Children: 2
- Education: Tel Aviv University; Tbilisi State University (BA); Georgian Institute of Public Affairs (MA)

Giorgi Arveladze (Georgian: გიორგი არველაძე, born July 10, 1978) is a Georgian politician who served as the Minister of Economic Development from 2006 to 2008 under President Mikheil Saakashvili. Arveladze is an ally of Saakashvili and played a central role in the Rose Revolution of November 2003.

== Education ==
In 1993, Arveladze spent a year studying abroad in the United States and said it "inspired" his later career. Many members of the Saakashvili government that Arveladze worked with, also attended schools in the United States.

Arveladze attended Tel Aviv University from 1997 to 1998, studying political science. In 1999, he studied at Tbilisi State University, earning a bachelor's degree in international relations. In 2000, he earned a master's degree from the Georgian Institute of Public Affairs.

== Career ==
=== Georgian Politics ===
From 1995 to 1998, Arveladze worked at several youth-focused non-governmental organizations. He then worked as a defense and national security consultant for the Georgian Parliament for several years. From January to October 2001, Arveladze worked as the Director of Penitentiary reforms under Minister of Justice, Mikheil Saakashvili. In October 2001, he was appointed the first secretary general for Saakashvili's new party, United National Movement (UNM). He would serve as secretary general for UNM, until stepping down on December 29, 2006, to focus on his new role of Minister of Economic Development.

Arveladze was a member of parliament, from April 2004 to October 2005. He was a member of the Defense and Security Committee and the Committee On European Integration. He headed Georgia's parliamentary permanent delegation to the NATO Parliamentary Assembly. From October 2005 to November 2006, he served as the Head of Administration, or Chief of Staff, for Saakashvili's government.

On November 20, 2006, he was appointed Minister of Economic Development following the resignation of his precursor Irakli Okruashvili. Kakha Damenia, a deputy under Arveladze, was found guilty for neglect of official duties in January 2020. Tamara Kovziridze, another deputy under Arveladze, now works for Reformatics, a boutique consulting firm.

=== Ukrainian Politics ===
In 2012, Arveladze moved to Ukraine with his wife, a native Ukrainian. Two years later he emerged as a member of former Ukrainian prime minister Yulia Tymoshenko's party Batkivshchyna after her release from prison. Tymoshenko introduced her party members on the TV program Shuster LIVE on October 24, 2014, and named Arveladze as a representative of Georgia's reformist government.
