= Palm Island (Miami Beach) =

Coordinates: 25.779979°N 80.162344°W

- Neighborhood of Miami Beach
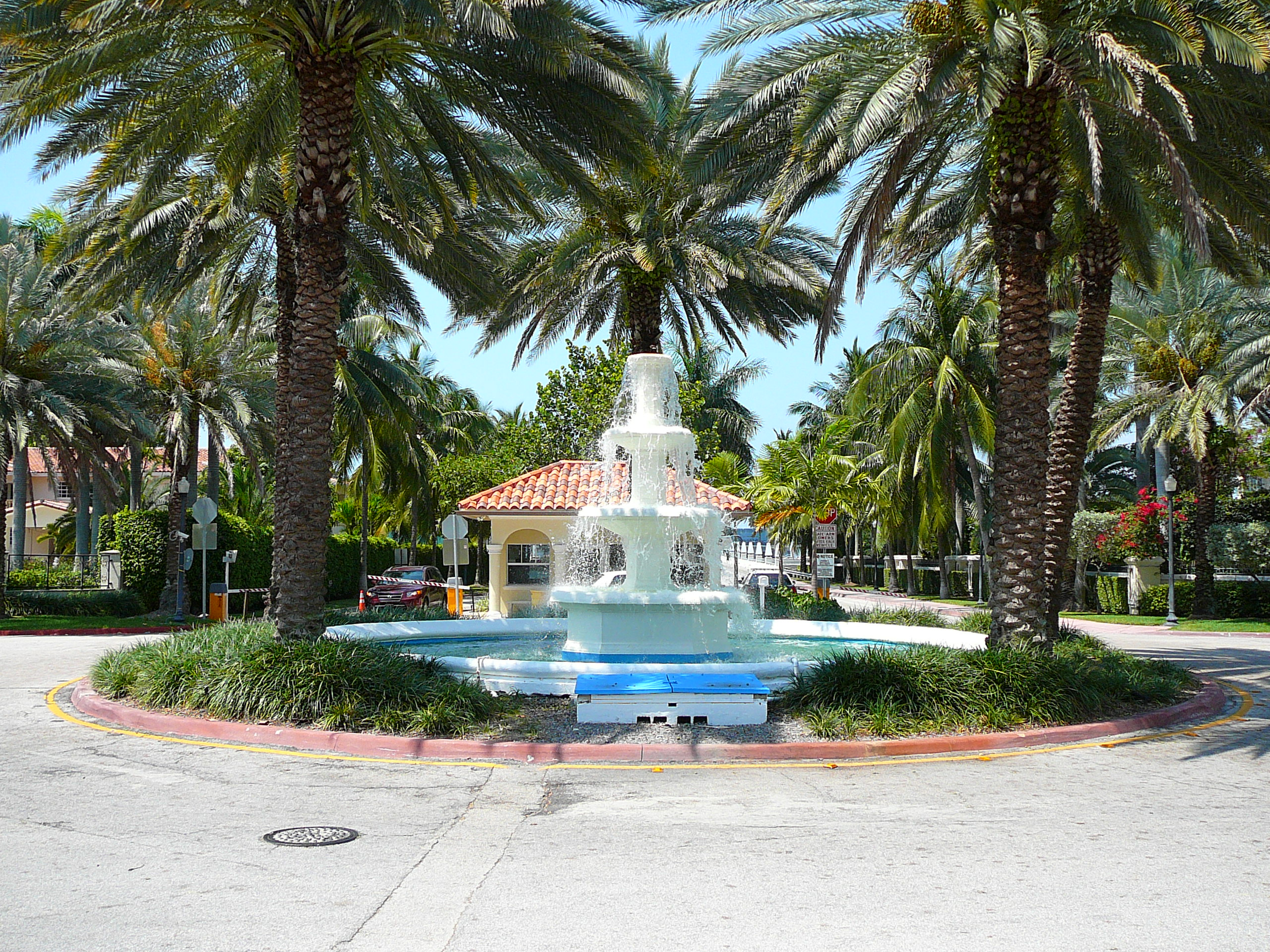
- Fountain and guard gate at the entrance to Palm Island in Miami Beach from the MacArthur Causeway
- Interactive map of Palm Island
- Country: United States
- State: Florida
- County: Miami-Dade County
- City: Miami Beach
- Established: 1922

Government
  - Miami Beach Mayor: Dan Gelber
  - Miami-Dade County Commissioner: Bruno Barreiro
  - House of Representatives: Fabián Basabe (R)
  - State Senate: Ileana Garcia (R)
  - U.S. House: Frederica Wilson (D)

Area
  - Total: 0.129 sq mi (0.33 km^{2})
  - Land: 0.129 sq mi (0.33 km^{2})
  - Water: 0.0 sq mi (0 km^{2}) 0.0%

Population (2010)
  - Total: 329
- Time zone: UTC−5 (EST)
- ZIP Code: 33139
- Area codes: 305, 786

Palm Island is a neighborhood in the city of Miami Beach on a man-made island in Biscayne Bay, Florida, United States; just south of Hibiscus Island. It is a residential neighborhood with high property values, accessible by land via the MacArthur Causeway. The entire island has an area of 82 acres (33 ha).

== History ==
The dredging which created the reclaimed land on which Palm Island sits was completed in 1922 by the Army Corps of Engineers, work which completed Hibiscus Island and Star Island the same year.

The island's most notorious resident was Al Capone, who bought a summer home there in 1928 for $40,000. He then spent another $200,000 on expansions and refurbishments. After having been released from prison in 1939 he lived there permanently until his death in 1947. The Al Capone home was bought by a property developer for $10.75 million in 2021.

== Education ==
Palm Island is zoned to schools in the Miami-Dade County Public Schools.

Zoned schools include:

- South Pointe Elementary School
- Nautilus Middle School
- Miami Beach High School

== Notable people ==
- Gabrielle Anwar, actress
- Al Capone, former gangster
- Sam Coslow, former musician and film producer
- Ana Gabriel, singer and songwriter
- Rajat Gupta, former McKinsey & Company CEO and felon
- Nick Nolte, actor
- Scott Storch, record producer and songwriter
- Barbara Walters, former broadcast journalist
- Bryan "Birdman" Williams, rap musician and record executive

== Gallery ==
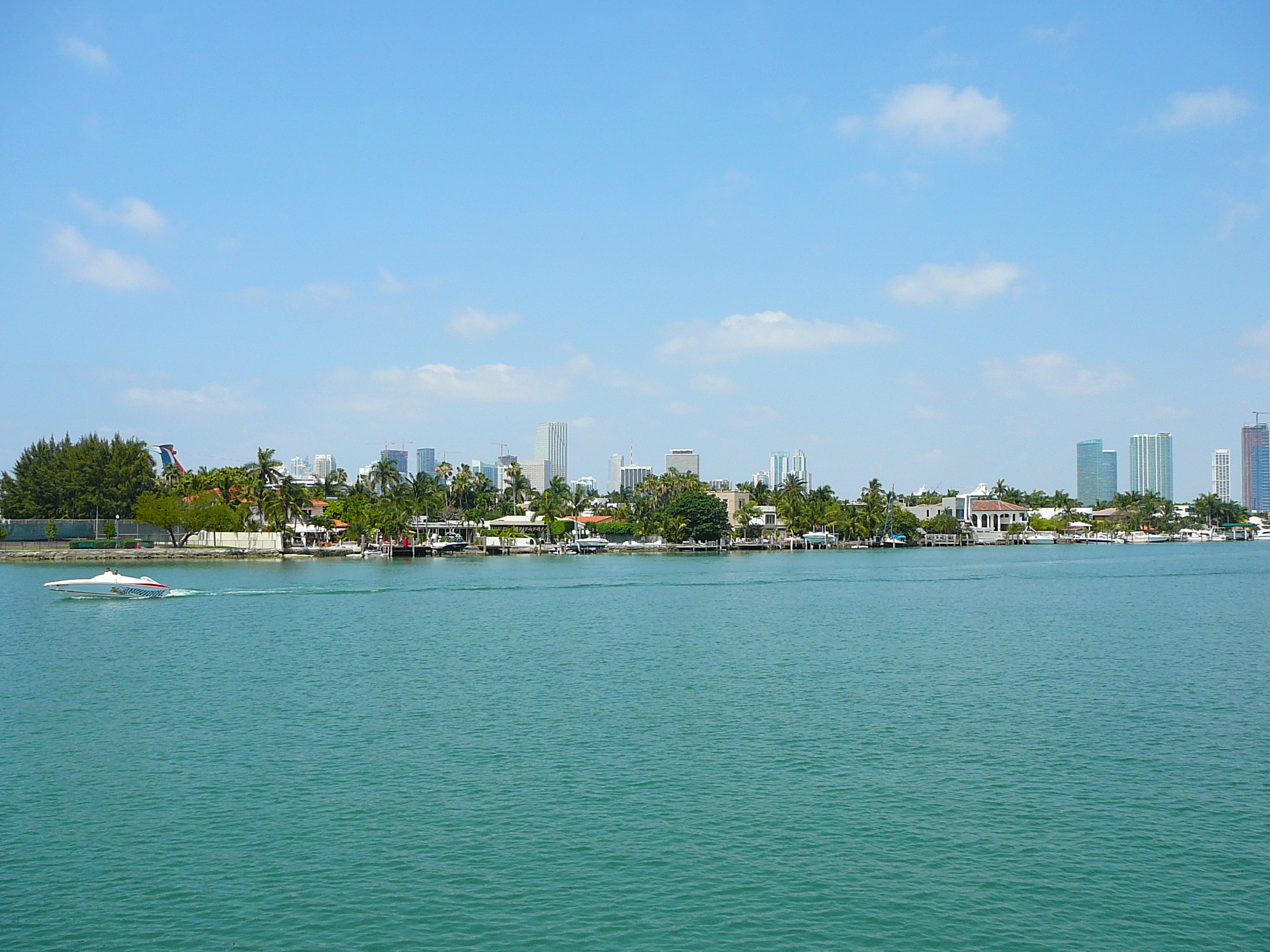
Palm Island as seen from Hibiscus Island

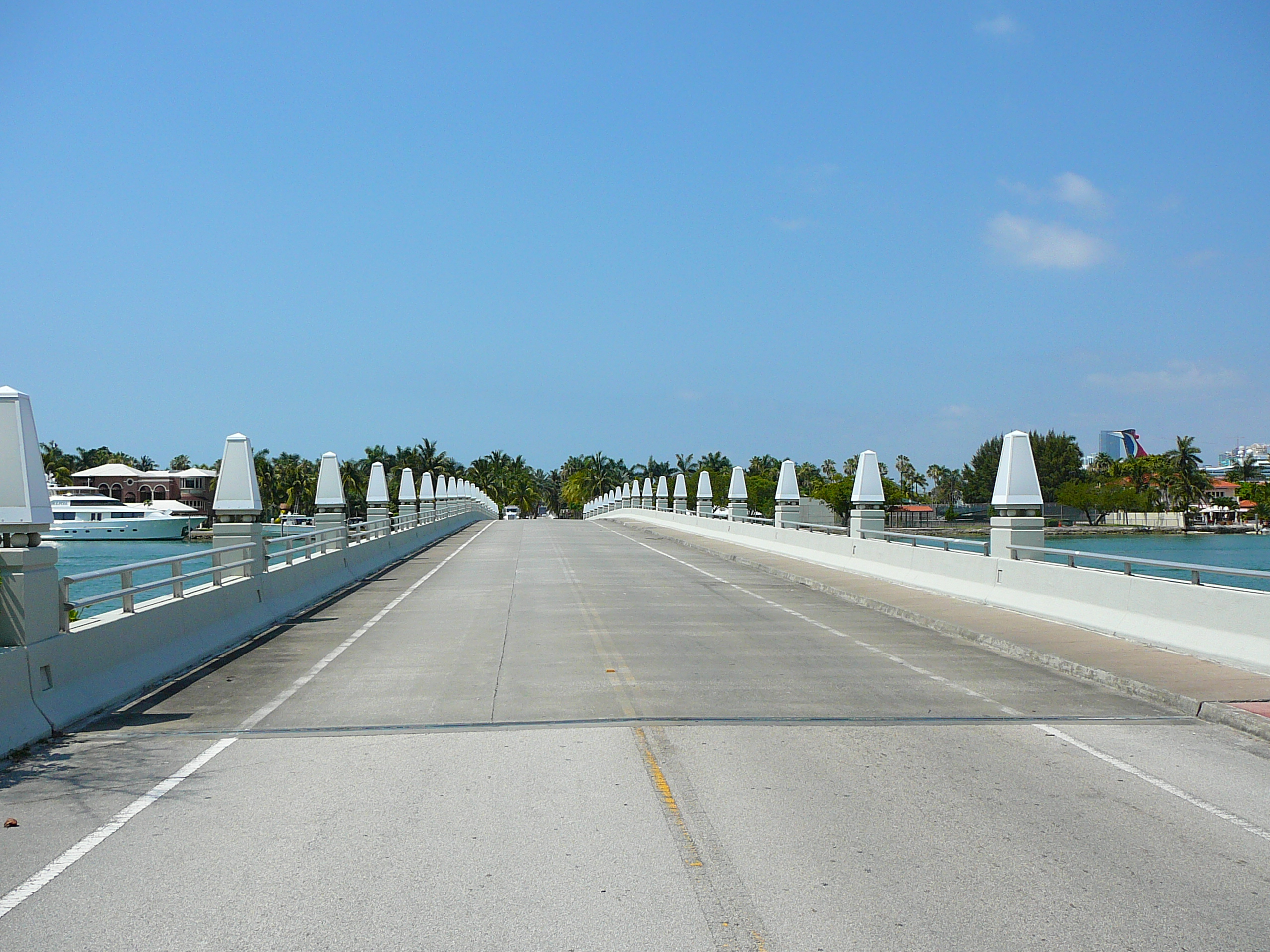
Bridge connecting Hibiscus & Palm Islands
