= Star Island (Miami Beach) =

- Neighborhood of Miami Beach
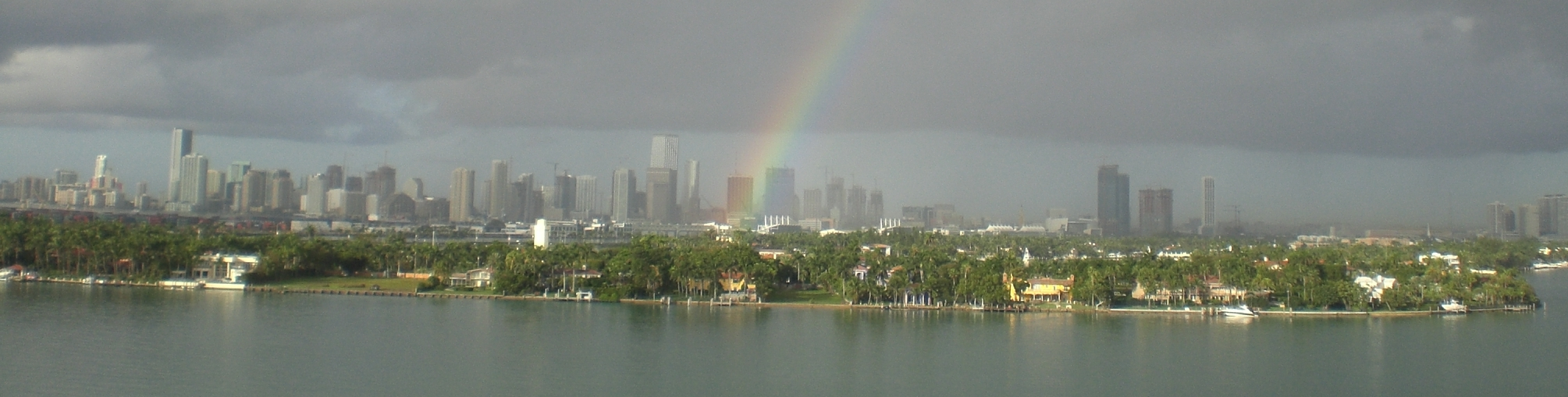
- Star Island seen from South Beach

- Location in the United States
- Country: United States
- State: Florida
- County: Miami-Dade County
- City: Miami Beach
- Established: 1922

Government
  - Miami Beach Mayor: Dan Gelber
  - Miami-Dade County Commissioner: Bruno Barreiro (R)
  - House of Representatives: Fabián Basabe (R)
  - State Senate: Jason Pizzo (D)
  - U.S. House: Maria Elvira Salazar (R)

Area
  - Total: 0.134 sq mi (0.35 km^{2})
  - Land: 0.134 sq mi (0.35 km^{2})
  - Water: 0.0 sq mi (0 km^{2}) 0.0%

Population (2010)
  - Total: 98
- Time zone: UTC-05 (EST)
- ZIP Code: 33139
- Area codes: 305, 786

Star Island is a neighborhood in the city of Miami Beach on a man-made island in Biscayne Bay, Florida, United States. The island is south of the Venetian Islands and just east of Palm and Hibiscus islands.

== Background ==
The name Star Island is thought to have originated from the fact that many of the homes on the island were once owned by famous celebrities and high-profile individuals, giving the island a “star-studded” reputation. Completed in 1922 by the Army Corps of Engineers by dredging sand, the land was initially owned by developer Carl Fisher, who purchased several land parcels of what would become the city of Miami Beach. It is accessible by land and barrier islands via the MacArthur Causeway. According to Bloomberg L.P., it is the most expensive neighborhood in the United States.

== Education ==
Students from Star Island are served by the following schools of the Miami-Dade County Public Schools:

- South Pointe Elementary School
- Nautilus Middle School
- Miami Beach High School

== Notable residents ==
- Sean Combs, rapper and record producer
- Emilio and Gloria Estefan, musicians
- Phillip Frost, entrepreneur and philanthropist
- Edward Howland Robinson Green, businessman and politician
- Enrique Iglesias, musician
- Don Johnson, actor
- Rosie O'Donnell, comedian and actress O’Donnell purchased a house on the island in 1999 that was the subject of a 1979 trial in which prosecutors alleged that it was being used by members of the Ethiopian Zion Coptic Church to run a marijuana smuggling ring.
- Shaquille O'Neal, former professional basketball player
- Rick Ross, rapper and record executive
- Xuxa, children's television presenter

== In popular culture ==
In 1994, some scenes from the movie The Specialist were filmed on Star Island.
