= Hibiscus Island =

Coordinates: 25.783216°N 80.16052°W

- Neighborhood of Miami Beach
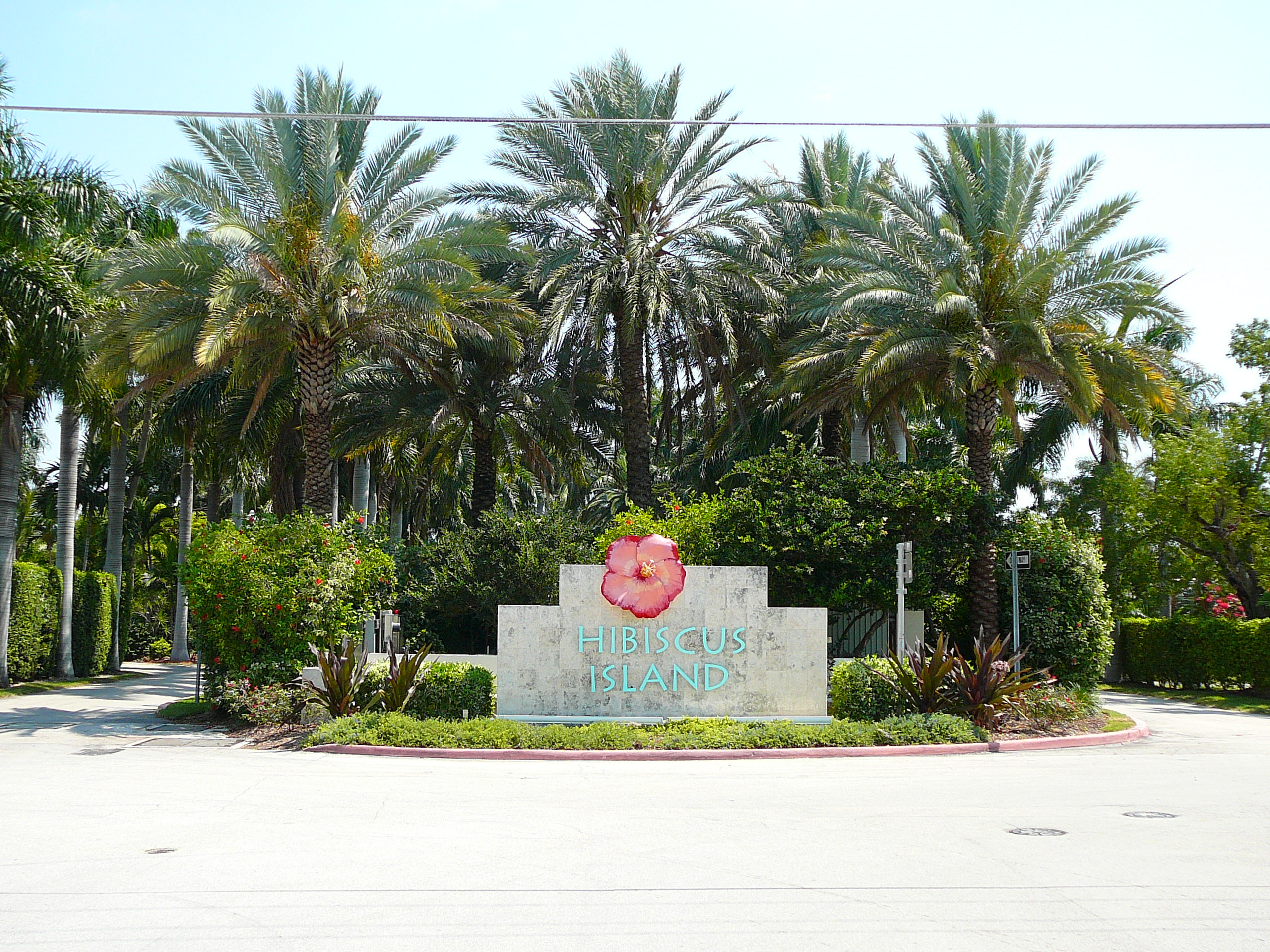
- Road entrance to Hibiscus Island in Miami Beach, north of Palm Island and the MacArthur Causeway
- Interactive map of Hibiscus Island
- Country: United States
- State: Florida
- County: Miami-Dade County
- City: Miami Beach
- Established: 1922

Government
  - Miami Beach Mayor: Dan Gelber
  - Miami-Dade County Commissioner: Bruno Barreiro
  - House of Representatives: Cynthia A. Stafford (D)
  - State Senate: Gwen Margolis (D)
  - U.S. House: Maria Elvira Salazar (R)

Area
  - Total: 0.109 sq mi (0.28 km^{2})
  - Land: 0.109 sq mi (0.28 km^{2})
  - Water: 0.0 sq mi (0 km^{2}) 0.0%

Population (2010)
  - Total: 394
- Time zone: UTC-05 (EST)
- ZIP Code: 33139
- Area codes: 305, 786

Hibiscus Island is a neighborhood in the city of Miami Beach on a man-made island in Biscayne Bay, Florida, United States. Hibiscus Island lies just north of Palm Island. It is an exclusive residential neighborhood with relatively high property values. The island is accessible via the MacArthur Causeway.

== History ==
The dredging that created the reclaimed land on which Hibiscus Island sits was completed in 1922 by the Army Corps of Engineers, work that completed Palm and Star Island the same year. Into the 1930s, as the Great Depression diminished real estate prospects in the wake of the Florida land boom of the 1920s, The twin islands of Hibiscus and Palm Island became the winter home of many celebrities who were impressed by the views of the skylines of Downtown Miami and Miami Beach.

In the post-World War II economic expansion and sprawl in South Florida, Palm and Hibiscus Island became the site of the Famous Latin Quarter Nightclub in the 1940s and 1950s. Owned by Lou Walters, father of journalist Barbara Walters, the Latin Quarter was a mid-century mecca for big-named entertainers who performed for winter crowds of tourists and celebrities arriving in Miami Beach each December. Entertainers such as Frank Sinatra, Dean Martin, Sammy Davis Jr., and Tony Bennett all intermingled with waves of high-kicking chorus girls to perform three shows a night at the Latin Quarter.

The island is now home of several mansions, with converted apartments and condominiums. Home of relatively high property values in the greater Miami area, it is among the first places to evacuate in advance of a hurricane.

== Education ==
Hibiscus Island is zoned with schools in the Miami-Dade County Public Schools.

Zoned schools include the following:

- South Pointe Elementary School
- Nautilus Middle School
- Miami Beach High School
