= Badri Patarkatsishvili =

Jewish-Georgian businessman (1955–2008)

- ბადრი პატარკაციშვილი
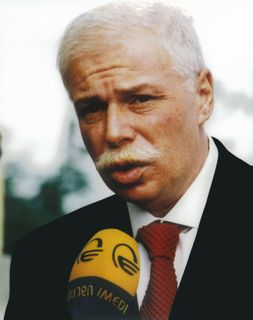
- Patarkatsishvili in 2007
- Born: 31 October 1955; Tbilisi, Georgian SSR, Soviet Union
- Died: 12 February 2008 (aged 52); Leatherhead, Surrey, United Kingdom
- Occupations: Former Owner and CEO of Imedi, businessman, and Politician
- Spouse: Inna Gudavadze

Arkady Shalvovich "Badri" Patarkatsishvili (Georgian: ბადრი პატარკაციშვილი; Hebrew: בדרי פטרקצישווילי; 31 October 1955 – 12 February 2008) was a Georgian businessman who also became extensively involved in politics. He contested the 2008 Georgian presidential election and came third with 7.1% of the votes. From the early 1980s until the time of his death, he was a flamboyant figure in business and was behind some of the most successful companies in today's Russia. From humble origins, he became the wealthiest citizen in Georgia with an estimated wealth of $12 billion. He was also one of the country's largest philanthropists.

Patarkatsishvili suddenly died intestate in February 2008, sparking one of the largest estate battles in legal history. In October 2018, the government of Georgia officially accused the former president of Georgia Mikheil Saakashvili of ordering Patarkatsishvili's assassination.

== Early life ==
Born in Tbilisi to a Jewish family, Patarkatsishvili became an active member of the Komsomol, the youth wing of the Soviet Communist Party during the 1980s. He eventually became Komsomol leader at Maudi, a large textile operation.

In 1984, Patarkatsishvili became Deputy Director General of Gruzavtovazprom, a company that purchased and delivered cars and spare parts from AvtoVAZ, which was at the time, the largest car manufacturer in the Soviet Union. It was during trips made to the AvtoVAZ plant that he first met Boris Berezovsky who was to become a close friend and business associate. In 1989, Patarkatsishvili and Berezovsky founded LogoVaz (Russian: ЛогоВАЗ) with some of the senior executives of AvtoVAZ. LogoVaz developed software for AvtoVAZ, sold Soviet-made cars and serviced foreign cars. It was established as a joint venture with Logo Systems, an Italian company, which at the time was seen as pioneering in commercial relationships between East and West. LogoVaz established an office in Georgia and Patarkatsishvili became Deputy Director General of the company.

== Move to Moscow and involvement with ORT ==
In 1992 with support from his friend Otari Kvantriashvili, Patarkatsishvili and his family moved to the Moscow region, first to Lyubertsy in 1993 and then in 1994 to Moscow, where he quickly became part of Berezovsky's increasingly influential political circle. (Note: Otari Kvantriashvili (Russian: Отари Квантриашвили) was a Georgian mafia boss who was killed on 5 April 1994 by a member of the Orekhovo-Medvedkovo gang, Aleksei Sherstobitov (Russian: Алексей Шерстобитов) or Lesha Soldat or Lesha the Soldier (Russian: Лёша Солдат), who pled guilty to his murder on 14 August 2008 and received 23 years in prison.) LogoVaz had by this time become an extremely successful company and had made Patarkatsishvili a wealthy man. (Note: While Patarkatsishvili was a deputy director at LogoVaz, Magomed Uzhakhovich Ismailov (Russian: Магомед Ужахович Исмаилов), who was a close friend and confidant of Dzhokhar Dudayev's counterintelligence chief "Khozhi" Khozh-Akhmet Nukhaev also transliterated as Khozh-Akhmed Nukhayev or Khozh-Ahmed Noukhayev (Russian: Хож-Ахмет Нухаев or Хож-Ахмед Нухаев or Хож-Ахмет Таштамирович Нухаев) and both Khozhi and Movladi Atlangeriev (Russian: Мовлади Атлангериев) owned a combined 39% stake in Saint Petersburg's branch of LogoVAZ JSC (Russian: АО "ЛогоВАЗ"), headed the security service of LogoVAZ.) At the time, the Soviet Union was collapsing and there was a great deal of political uncertainty in the region. Patarkatsishvili, along with Berezvosky and other successful businessmen were supportive of Boris Yeltsin as he had liberalised trade with foreign countries, allowing their businesses to grow, however the wider economy was performing badly and there was growing support for Nikolai Ryzhkov's reformed communist party.

By 1994, Berezovsky had secured control of ORT, the largest TV station in Russia at the time, and he installed Patarkatsishvili as First Deputy General Director, in charge of financial activities. (Note: While Patarkatsishvili was in charge of commercial and financial activities as ORT deputy director general, he both often conflicted with the then-director general Vladislav Listyev, who was assassinated on 1 March 1995, and also headed ORT Reklama, which controlled ORT's very large advertisement revenues that allegedly were from "black cash" (Russian: "черный нал" or "чёрный нал"). From 1996 until 2000, the former KGB and FSB officer Andrey Lugovoy, who, later, allegedly supported the 2006 assassination of Alexander Litvinenko, headed both security at ORT and also Patarkatsishvili's family and personal security unit from 1996 until 2000.) Patarkatsishvili and Berezovsky with support from Mikhail Lesin then used the station's influence to assist Boris Yeltsin to victory in the 1996 presidential election. From 1994 until mid-2000, Patarkatsishvili was a key figure at ORT.

== Sibneft privatisation ==
In 1997, he was selected to oversee the privatization of the Sibneft oil company. Sibneft was the youngest oil holding company in Russia at the time having been created hastily in early 1995 out of Rosneft. An unknown entity, Oil Finance Corporation (NFK), that had been created out of Menatep, a holding company started by Mikhail Khodorkovsky, won the auction. Berezovsky had an interest in the Menatep Group and for this reason, there was some speculation that the auction had been fixed. It later emerged that the company had been sold for a fraction of the market value.

After Patarkatsishvili died, in 2012 the Sibneft privatisation was to become the subject of a high court legal battle between Chelsea football club owner Roman Abramovich and Berezovsky. According to The Times, Abramovich submitted a 53-page court defence that accused Berezovsky and Patarkatsishvili of demanding huge sums for helping him to rise from obscurity. Patarkatsishvili emerged as the key intermediary, passing messages between Abramovich and Berezovsky. Patarkatsishvili was offered $500 million by Roman Abramovich, the defence papers that were submitted admit, for protecting Roman in Russia's aluminium wars.

== TV6 and Kommersant ==
Following his success at ORT, in April 2001, Patarkatsishvili was appointed General Director of Russia's TV6 channel, which, like ORT, was partly owned by Berezovsky. Under his control, TV6 became notorious for its anti-Kremlin line.

In the late 1990s, Berezovsky and Patarkatsishvili also purchased Kommersant the one of Russia's most influential political newspapers. In 2006, Berezovsky sold his controlling stake to Patarkatsishvili, increasing Patarkatsishvili's holding to 100%. Patarkatsishvili then organised the sale of Kommersant in August 2006 to senior Gazprom executive Alisher Usmanov.

== Political trouble in Russia ==
By mid 1999, Boris Yeltsin began losing his grip on power and Boris Berezovsky began to play an important role in the hunt for his successor. He did this in order to counter the political aspirations of the Prime Minister Yevgeny Primakov, who was seen as more of a statist. As Berezovsky lost favour with the Kremlin, investigations began into his business affairs which Berezovsky claimed to be politically motivated. This eventually led to an arrest warrant for Berezovsky being issued in April 1999 by the Prosecutor General, Yury Skuratov. Although Patarkatsishvili had sought to distance himself from Berezovsky's political dealings his proximity to Berezovsky was such that he began to fear that he may also be arrested, so in 2000, he left Moscow for his native Georgia.

When Vladimir Putin was elected in March 2000, Patarkatsishvili hoped that the situation for Berezovsky and himself in Russia would improve. He and Berezovsky had supported Putin in his election campaign. Patarkatsishvili later claimed that he had recommended Putin to Pavel Borodin, then a senior member of President Boris Yeltsin's Kremlin administration. Berezovsky had also gotten Putin appointed as Russian FSB director.

However, Berezovsky quickly fell out with the new president. On May 31, Berezovsky sharply attacked the constitutional reform proposed by Putin, which would give the Kremlin the right to dismiss elected governors. In an open letter to Putin published in Kommersant Berezovsky, then a Duma deputy, said that he would be obliged to vote against the president's legislative project, which was "directed toward changing the state's structure" and represented a "threat to Russia's territorial integrity and democracy." Things came to a head in August 2000 when Berezovsky used ORT to attack Putin for his handling of the sinking of the Kursk submarine, blaming the death of 118 sailors on the Kremlin's reluctance to accept foreign help. This began to put pressure also on to Patarkatsishvili, whose association with Berezovsky was well known and was at the time, controlling the ORT station.

In December 2000, Nikolay Glushkov a co-founder of AvtoVAZ and a close associate of Patarkatsishvili and Berezovsky was arrested as part of the Russian Prosecutor General's investigation in Aeroflot, a company that Berezovsky had an interest in. Patarkatsishvili and Berezovsky believed the arrest to be politically motivated and part of the Kremlin's attempt to put pressure on their businesses. Glushkov suffered from a hereditary blood disease and had to receive special medical treatment in hospital. Patarkatsishvili and Berezovsky began negotiations with the Government for his release agreeing to give up their media interests and for Berezovsky to end his political ambitions. However, in June 2001, the Russian Prosecutor General's Office charged Patarkatsishvili with organizing an attempted escape from prison of Glushkov and issued an arrest warrant for him through Interpol.

Believing that he would not be given a fair trial, Patarkatsishvili refused to come in for questioning and, on July 4, 2001, he gave an interview to the Kommersant newspaper setting out his version of events in an attempt to clear his name. To avoid prosecution in Russia, Patarkatsishvili moved to Tbilisi where he had been granted political asylum. Further charges relating to the misappropriation of AvtoVaz were added in October 2002.

== Investment and philanthropy in Georgia ==
Upon his return, Patarkatsishvili began investing much of the wealth that he had accumulated in Russia into his native country. He had become personally wealthier than the entire state budget and so was able to invest in business ventures and charitable projects in a scale that had been previously unimaginable to the impoverished country. He bought the Tbilisi city football team, Dinamo Tbilisi, the Kulevi oil terminal and financed a new shopping centre in the capital and a holiday resort on the Black Sea.

He also became the head of the federation of Georgian businessmen and head of the Georgian National Olympic Committee, subsidized social programs and cultural activities, and on two occasions paid debts for the gas and electricity consumed by Tbilisi residents. He funded several charity projects including schools, amusement parks — even a monastery. In return for these paternal gifts, the then president Eduard Shevardnadze agreed to allow him the state's protection from charges against him in Russia.

In December 2001, he founded Imedi Media Holding, the first independent broadcasting station in Georgia.

== Involvement in politics in Georgia ==
During his early career, Patarkatsishvili had shown little interest in politics. However, when the Rose Revolution began in 2003 and Patarkatsishvili could see that Eduard Shevardnadze was losing his grip on power, he used his wealth to support the new opposition candidate Mikheil Saakashvili.

During 2005, Patarkatsishvili hosted Boris Berezovsky and Neil Bush during their visit to Georgia.

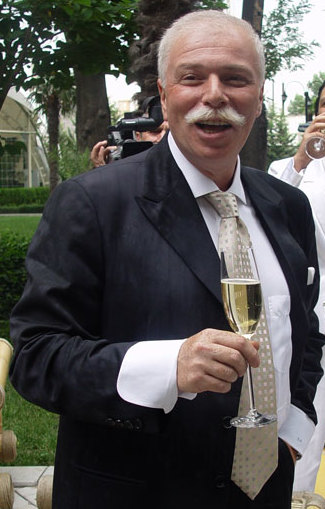
Patarkazischwili in 2006

Relations between Patarkatsishvili and Saakashvili soon deteriorated, however, and they became bitter rivals. Patarkatsishvili claimed that this was due to the coverage given by Imedi to opposition parties; Saakashvili claimed that Patarkatsishvili was attempting to use his wealth to gain control of business life in Georgia. Patarkatsishvili began financing opposition parties in late 2006 and early 2007 and a pro-Patarkatsishvili group in parliament soon emerged that developed into the Our Georgia party.

In late 2007, he became embroiled in a political scandal after former defense minister Irakli Okruashvili on September 25, 2007, accused Mikheil Saakashvili, the President of Georgia, of planning Patarkatsishvili's assassination. Arrested on corruption charges, however, Okruashvili retracted his accusations against the president, winning release on bail of 10 million Georgian lari (about US$6,250,000). He also said that his earlier accusations levelled against Saakashvili were not true and were aimed at gaining political dividends for himself and Patarkatsishvili and at discrediting the President of Georgia. On November 6, Okruashvili, said on Patarkatsishvili's Imedi TV — by then managed by Fox TV's parent News Corporation — that he had been forced into retracting his accusations against Saakashvili by pressure that he endured in prison. Down the line from Munich, he said: "All of those accusations, all of those facts that I brought against Saakashvili, everything I said about him is the plain truth."

As Patarkatsishvili lost favour with Saakashvili's government in 2007, numerous allegations of corruption were made against him. He was impeached as president of the Georgian National Olympic Committee, and also quit as a president of the Georgian Business Federation. Tbilisi-based Rustavi 2 TV, a channel controlled by Saakashvili's government, linked his name with several notorious murders in Russia and Georgia, including the assassination of Vlad Listyev.

A particular flash point with Saakashvili's government was Imedi's reporting of the 2006 murder of Sandro Girgvliani. Imedi produced evidence, some of it from CCT TV security cameras at the Patarkatsishvili family home which overlooked the main highway in Tbilisi, that Girgviliani's murderers were officers of the interior ministry's elite security division and were closely connected to Vano Merabishvili, the interior minister and widely seen as Saakashvili's closest political ally. The revelations sparked widespread anger as Merabishvili's use of armed officers to crush corruption had already led to the deaths of innocent people and it was now perceived by many that the violence was being used to settle entirely personal grievances which could not be justified in any policy terms.

On October 29, 2007, Patarkatsishvili publicly announced his plans to finance ten opposition parties' campaign aimed at holding early parliamentary elections in April 2008. On November 2, 2007, he addressed a large anti-government rally held in downtown Tbilisi and pledged to further support it. He left Georgia for London shortly afterwards. After the demonstration turned violent, following police attacks, on November 7, 2007, Georgia's Chief Prosecutor's Office announced that he was suspected of conspiracy to overthrow the government. On November 11, he said he would run as Independent in the January 5, 2008 presidential elections under the slogan "Georgia without Saakashvili is Georgia without Terror." Leaders of the major opposition parties distanced themselves from Patarkatsishvili, who had to run as an independent presidential candidate.

On December 24 and 25, 2007, the prosecutor-general's office of Georgia released a series of audio and video recordings of the two separate meetings of the high-ranking Georgian Interior Ministry official Erekle Kodua with Patarkatsishvili and the head of his pre-election campaign Valeri Gelbakhiani. According to the government, Patarkatsishvili was trying to bribe Kodua to take part in what the Georgian officials described as an attempted coup d'état on January 6, 2008, the next of the scheduled presidential elections. The plan included to stage a mass manifestation against the government and to "neutralize" the Interior Minister Vano Merabishvili. Later independent journalist Vakhtang Komakidze produced what he said was the full transcript of the recorded conversation which showed that Patarkatsishvili was advising against violence and the extracts released had been doctored The accusations forced Patarkatsishvili onto the defensive. He confirmed that he met with Kodua in London, but denied that the bribe was in connection to an alleged coup plot and claimed instead that his intention was to uncover what he said were official plans to rig the election. He also confirmed that he offered Kodua "a huge amount of money" in exchange for defecting from the authorities allegedly to avert a possible use of force by the government against the planned January rallies.

On December 28, 2007, Patarkatsishvili announced that he would withdraw his bid for presidency, but would nominally remain a candidate until January 4, 2008. On January 3, 2008, he reversed himself, however, and decided to run in presidential elections. In response, his top campaign official Giorgi Zhvania (brother of late Prime Minister Zurab Zhvania) resigned, declaring that Patarkatsishvili did not have the unquestionable reputation one would expect of a country's president. Patarkatsishvili earned 7% vote and came in third place.

== Interest in sports ==
Patarkatsishvili was chairman of the Dinamo Tbilisi football club. He also was president of the Georgian National Olympic Committee (GNOC), until being impeached in October 2007, after falling out with the government.

In September 2006, Patarkatsishvili announced that he was considering a bid for the London football club West Ham. However, the deal never came to fruition.

== Death ==
Patarkatsishvili, aged 52, collapsed at Downside Manor, his mansion in Leatherhead, Surrey, England on February 12, 2008, at 10.45 pm. Ambulance crew members tried unsuccessfully to resuscitate him and he was pronounced dead at 10.52 pm. As in any other case of unexpected death, Surrey police treated the case as "suspicious" and launched an official investigation.

The businessman spent his last day in the City of London office of international law firm Debevoise and Plimpton, meeting his business partner Boris Berezovsky, his spokesperson Tim Bell and his lawyers Lord Goldsmith KC and Richard Gibbon, as well as fellow exiles, the Russians Nikolai Glushkov and Yuli Dubov From the City he left for Down Street, Mayfair, to visit Berezovsky's office, and at 7pm returned to Leatherhead in his Maybach. Shortly after dining, Patarkatsishvili told his family he felt unwell and went upstairs to his bedroom where he was found unconscious after a heart attack.

Preliminary reports indicated a heart attack as the cause of death. According to the first post-mortem tests, the death of Patarkatsishvili appeared to have been from natural cardiac-related causes. According to the pathologist Ashley Fegan-Earl, he could identify a "severity that could have resulted in a sudden and unexplained collapse and death at any time." He also concluded that chest pain that Patarkatsishvili had had and a sudden collapse "were consistent with death due to coronary heart diseases." Patarkatsishvili's father, Shalva Patarkatsishvili, also died of a heart attack at an early age of 48. The businessman had no history of illness but was reported to have led an unhealthy lifestyle, smoking excessively and taking no exercise.

According to Tim Bell, "he [Patarkatsishvili] always looked 10 years older than he was." However, theories of a possible assassination were considered seriously by some. "[A] number of compounds known to be used by the former KGB can induce heart failure, but leave virtually no trace. One is sodium fluoroacetate, a fine white powder derived from pesticide." The British police checked Patarkatsishvili's Surrey mansion for radioactive elements but reportedly found nothing suspicious.

He is buried in the courtyard of his residence Arkadia in Tbilisi, which is located in the former Wedding Palace.

=== British press coverage ===
London Lite was the first newspaper to inform the British public of the Georgian oligarch's death on the evening of 13 February 2008. In the news of 14 February 2008, Patarkatsishvili's death was covered in The Guardian, The Times, Financial Times, The Daily Telegraph, The Independent, etc. Most newspapers discussed Patarkatsishvili's business history, including his close ties with Boris Berezovsky, Roman Abramovich, Alexander Litvinenko, Mikheil Saakashvili and Vladimir Putin.

=== International press coverage ===
According to Reuters, a source close to the late businessman said on the day of his death that Patarkatsishvili feared the Georgian authorities were plotting to kill him.

Associated Press reported that on December 26, 2007, Patarkatsishvili said that he had obtained a tape recording of an official in his homeland's Interior Ministry asking a Chechen warlord to murder the tycoon in London. "I believe they want to kill me," he said. He said the tape had been given to police.

Novaya Gazeta reported the following information. Patarkatsishvili, living in London, was approached by members of the Saakashvili government demanding that he sell his controlling share in the dissident Imedi TV network. Initially, Patarkatsishvili refused, but was then offered an unprecedented deal: exchanging ownership of Imedi for ownership of the entire Georgian railroad system. Being a businessman, Patarkatsishvili reportedly agreed; however, when the Saakashvili side sent him the contract, there was a new clause, which required Patarkatsishvili to invest $2,000,000,000 in the "improvement" of the railroad property. He refused, but died shortly after. Novaya Gazeta's source is one of the lawyers from the legal side of this deal.

== Estate battle ==
Following Patarkatsishvili's death, several of his closest business associates made attempts to claim his business assets from his family members, who were entitled to his residual estate under Georgian law, as he had died without leaving a valid will.

Shortly after Patarkatsishvili died, Joseph Kay, the stepson of his aunt and someone who had assisted him with his business affairs, along with the American lawyer, Emmanuel Zeltser, attempted to take control of Imedi, Mtatsminda Park and the Rustavi Metallurgical Plant in Georgia, as well as other assets belonging to Inna Gudavadze and the Patarkatsishvili family, including a large development on Fisher Island in Florida, by claiming to be in possession of Patarkatsishvili's last will and testament that appointed Kay as executor of the estate. These documents were later declared to be forgeries in the UK High Court. Kay's case was comprehensively dismissed by Mr Justice Dudley in the Supreme Court of Gibraltar in February 2010. Justice Dudley described Kay's case as "wholly unconvincing" adding that he was a "mendacious individual" and "certainly not a witness of truth." After several further legal battles in the US, UK, and Georgia, the assets were returned to the Patarkatsishvili family.

Another claim over the estate was launched in 2012 by Boris Berezovsky. Berezovsky claimed that half of Patarkatsishvili's assets belong to him under a handshake agreement that the two men made in 1995 to split all their commercial interests equally. However, following the judgement of Gloster J in Berezovsky v Abramovich case in 2012 that gave a damning report of Berezovsky's character, Berezovsky quickly settled his case against the Patarkatsishvili family. The details of the settlement however remained confidential.

In 2013, Inna Gudavadze, her two daughters, Iya Patarkatsishvili and Liana Zhmotova, and Patarkatsishvili's mother Natela Patarkatsishvili brought a $1.8bn action against another of his business associates, Vasily Anisimov. The family claimed that they had a part-entitlement to the 20% share formerly held by Anisimov in mining company Metalloinvest. The case was settled in March 2014 before it came to court.

== Personal life ==
His wife was Inna Vasilievna Gudavadze (Russian: Инна Васильевна Гудавадзе; b. 1955, Tbilisi) and they had two daughters Liana (Russian: Лиана; b. 1980) and Inna (Russian: Инна; b. 1983).

== See also ==
- Kia Joorabchian
