= Inna Gudavadze =

Georgian businesswoman and philanthropist

Inna Gudavadze (Georgian: ინა გუდავაძე) is a Georgian-British businesswoman and philanthropist. She is the founder of a London-based family office overseeing her family assets with a focus on diversified portfolio of investments. She also is the founder of the Gudavadze-Patarkatsishvili Foundation which supports education initiatives in Georgia.

Born in Tbilisi, Georgia, Gudavadze graduated with honours from the Georgian State Institute of Foreign Languages. She married Badri Patarkatsishvili, Georgian businessman and philanthropist, in 1979 with whom she had two daughters, Liana and Iya. For 19 years she worked at the Tbilisi Scientific Research Institute of Electron-Ion Technology. She helped her husband during his life with numerous charitable and civic projects. The family moved to Moscow in 1993 and returned to Georgia in 2000. Since 2006 the family resides in the UK.

Following the untimely intestate death of her husband, Badri Patarkatsishvili, in 2008, Gudavadze and her family were thrust into a series of complex legal battles to reclaim assets across multiple jurisdictions, all of which have been successfully won or settled in favour of Gudavadze and her family.

== Business interests ==
Inna, and her family office, have interests in several companies or projects:

- Fisher Island Holdings – A developer of luxury residential projects on Fisher Island, a private island close to Miami Beach, Florida. Its two condominium projects were awarded Best US residential development at the 2017 International Property Awards.
- IDS Borjomi – A significant minority stake in Borjomi, one of the world’s largest producers of bottled mineral water. It has eight production facilities selling more than 1.5bn bottles of water a year, as well as other beverages.
- Mtatsminda Park – A popular amusement and landscape park overlooking Tbilisi.
- Portfolio Investments – A diversified portfolio of investments with significant allocation to the US and European private equity and venture capital.

== Philanthropy ==
In 2018, Inna launched The Gudavadze-Patarkatsishvili Foundation (გუდავაძე-პატარკაციშვილის ფონდი) (GPF) in her late husband's memory, focused on promoting education initiatives in Georgia. The foundation is the main sponsor of the Georgian National Teacher Prize, the Annual TVET Award for professional education and supports a scholarship program with the San Diego State University Georgia, as well as other initiatives in Georgian education.
